= 2025 Philippine House of Representatives elections in Metro Manila =

Elections in the Phiilippines

- May 12, 2025
- All 33 Metro Manila seats in the House of Representatives
Party	Seats	+/–
Lakas	9	+8
NUP	7	+1
Nacionalista	4	0
NPC	2	−2
Liberal	2	−1
MKTZNU	2	New
PFP	1	+1
Navoteño	1	0
UNA	1	0
Asenso	1	−2
Independent	3	0
This lists parties that won seats. See the complete results below.

The 2025 Philippine House of Representatives elections in Metro Manila were held on May 12, 2025, as part of the 2025 Philippine general election.

== Summary ==
Congressional district	Incumbent	Incumbent's party	Winner	Winner's party	Winning margin
Caloocan–1st	Oscar Malapitan	Nacionalista	Oscar Malapitan	Nacionalista	46.69%
Caloocan–2nd	Mitzi Cajayon	Lakas	Edgar Erice	Liberal	16.38%
Caloocan–3rd	Dean Asistio	Lakas	Dean Asistio	Lakas	Unopposed
Las Piñas	Camille Villar	Nacionalista	Mark Anthony Santos	Independent	12.80%
Makati–1st	Kid Peña	NPC	Monique Lagdameo	MKTZNU	84.08%
Makati–2nd	Luis Campos	NPC	Alden Almario	MKTZNU	10.38%
Malabon	Josephine Lacson-Noel	NPC	Antolin Oreta III	NUP	34.64%
Mandaluyong	Neptali Gonzales II	NUP	Alexandria Gonzales	NUP	Unopposed
Manila–1st	Ernix Dionisio	Lakas	Ernix Dionisio	Lakas	10.55%
Manila–2nd	Rolando Valeriano	NUP	Rolando Valeriano	NUP	5.48%
Manila–3rd	Joel Chua	Lakas	Joel Chua	Lakas	3.24%
Manila–4th	Edward Maceda	NPC	Giselle Lazaro-Maceda	Asenso Manileño	14.41%
Manila–5th	Irwin Tieng	Lakas	Irwin Tieng	Lakas	4.16%
Manila–6th	Benny Abante	NUP	Benny Abante	NUP	Unopposed
Marikina–1st	Marjorie Ann Teodoro	NUP	Marcelino Teodoro	NUP	44.14%
Marikina–2nd	Stella Quimbo	Lakas	Miro Quimbo	Lakas	23.50%
Muntinlupa	Jaime Fresnedi	Liberal	Jaime Fresnedi	Liberal	51.58%
Navotas	Toby Tiangco	Navoteño	Toby Tiangco	Navoteño	91.14%
Parañaque–1st	Edwin Olivarez	Lakas	Eric Olivarez	Lakas	Unopposed
Parañaque–2nd	Gustavo Tambunting	NUP	Brian Yamsuan	Independent	6.13%
Pasay	Antonino Calixto	Lakas	Antonino Calixto	Lakas	28.36%
Pasig	Roman Romulo	NPC	Roman Romulo	NPC	90.80%
Quezon City–1st	Arjo Atayde	Nacionalista	Arjo Atayde	Nacionalista	17.06%
Quezon City–2nd	Ralph Tulfo	PFP	Ralph Tulfo	PFP	67.84%
Quezon City–3rd	Franz Pumaren	NUP	Franz Pumaren	NUP	12.20%
Quezon City–4th	Marvin Rillo	Lakas	Bong Suntay	UNA	0.14%
Quezon City–5th	Patrick Michael Vargas	Lakas	Patrick Michael Vargas	Lakas	5.41%
Quezon City–6th	Marivic Co-Pilar	NUP	Marivic Co-Pilar	NUP	Unopposed
San Juan	Bel Zamora	Lakas	Bel Zamora	Lakas	33.08%
Taguig–Pateros	Ading Cruz	Nacionalista	Ading Cruz	Nacionalista	15.25%
Taguig	Pammy Zamora	Lakas	Jorge Daniel Bocobo	Nacionalista	10.25%
Valenzuela–1st	Vacant		Kenneth Gatchalian	NPC	0.49%
Valenzuela–2nd	Eric Martinez	Independent	Gerald Galang	Independent	8.72%

== Caloocan ==
=== 1st district ===
Incumbent Oscar Malapitan of the Nacionalista Party ran for a second term.

Malapitan won re-election against former Caloocan mayor Rey Malonzo (Katipunan ng Nagkakaisang Pilipino) and Johram Alama (Independent).

Candidate	Party	Votes	%
Oscar Malapitan (incumbent)	Nacionalista Party	198,244	71.79
Rey Malonzo	Katipunan ng Nagkakaisang Pilipino	69,298	25.10
Johram Alama	Independent	8,596	3.11
Total		276,138	100.00
Valid votes		276,138	92.82
Invalid/blank votes		21,355	7.18
Total votes		297,493	100.00
Registered voters/turnout		377,294	78.85
Nacionalista hold			
Source: Commission on Elections

=== 2nd district ===
Incumbent Mitch Cajayon-Uy of Lakas–CMD is running for a second term. She was previously affiliated with PDP–Laban.

Cajayon-Uy was defeated by former representative Edgar Erice of the Liberal Party. On November 26, 2024, the Second Division of the Commission on Elections (COMELEC) disqualified Erice for his criticism on the contract entered by COMELEC and Miru Systems for the 2025 elections. However, the Supreme Court ordered on January 14, 2025, to temporarily stop Erice's disqualification, allowing him to be listed on the ballot.

Candidate	Party	Votes	%
Edgar Erice	Liberal Party	105,363	58.19
Mitch Cajayon-Uy (incumbent)	Lakas–CMD	75,719	41.81
Total		181,082	100.00
Valid votes		181,082	96.01
Invalid/blank votes		7,535	3.99
Total votes		188,617	100.00
Registered voters/turnout		237,712	79.35
Liberal gain from Lakas			
Source: Commission on Elections

=== 3rd district ===
Incumbent Dean Asistio (Lakas–CMD) is won re-election for a second term unopposed. He was previously affiliated with PDP–Laban.

Candidate	Party	Votes	%
Dean Asistio (incumbent)	Lakas–CMD	93,708	100.00
Total		93,708	100.00
Valid votes		93,708	78.02
Invalid/blank votes		26,395	21.98
Total votes		120,103	100.00
Registered voters/turnout		150,243	79.94
Lakas hold			
Source: Commission on Elections

== Las Piñas ==
Incumbent Camille Villar of the Nacionalista Party retired to run for the Senate.

The Nacionalista Party nominated Villar's mother, Senator Cynthia Villar, who was defeated by city councilor Mark Anthony Santos, an independent. Two other candidates ran for representative.

Candidate	Party	Votes	%
Mark Anthony Santos	Independent	109,220	46.75
Cynthia Villar	Nacionalista Party	79,315	33.95
Louie Redoble	Katipunan ng Nagkakaisang Pilipino	35,730	15.29
Barry Tayam	Independent	9,359	4.01
Total		233,624	100.00
Valid votes		233,624	91.45
Invalid/blank votes		21,831	8.55
Total votes		255,455	100.00
Registered voters/turnout		318,542	80.20
Independent gain from Nacionalista			
Source: Commission on Elections

== Makati ==
=== 1st district ===
Incumbent Kid Peña of the Nationalist People's Coalition retired to run for vice mayor of Makati. He was previously affiliated with the Liberal Party.

Peña's endorsed Makati vice mayor Monique Lagdameo (Makatizens United Party), who won the election against two other candidates.

Candidate	Party	Votes	%
Monique Lagdameo	Makatizens United Party	130,355	89.82
Angelo Base	Independent	8,324	5.74
Minnie Antonio	Independent	6,458	4.45
Total		145,137	100.00
Valid votes		145,137	84.93
Invalid/blank votes		25,745	15.07
Total votes		170,882	100.00
Registered voters/turnout		216,152	79.06
MKTZNU gain from NPC			
Source: Commission on Elections

=== 2nd district ===
Following the transfer of the jurisdiction over the Embo barangays from Makati to Taguig in 2023, the district was reduced in 2024 to the barangays of Guadalupe Nuevo, Guadalupe Viejo and Pinagkaisahan.

Term-limited incumbent Luis Campos of the Nationalist People's Coalition ran for mayor of Makati.

Campos endorsed city councilor Alden Almario (Makatizens United Party), who won the election against former city councilor Vincent Sese (United Nationalist Alliance).

Candidate	Party	Votes	%
Alden Almario	Makatizens United Party	19,834	55.19
Vincent Sese	United Nationalist Alliance	16,101	44.81
Total		35,935	100.00
Valid votes		35,935	91.74
Invalid/blank votes		3,235	8.26
Total votes		39,170	100.00
Registered voters/turnout		54,088	72.42
MKTZNU gain from NPC			
Source: Commission on Elections

== Malabon ==
Incumbent Josephine Lacson-Noel of the Nationalist People's Coalition (NPC) retired to run for mayor of Malabon.

The NPC nominated Lacson Noel's husband, former An Waray party-list representative Bem Noel, who was defeated by former Malabon mayor Antolin Oreta III of the National Unity Party. Former representative Ricky Sandoval (Lakas–CMD) and Malabon vice mayor Bernard dela Cruz (PDP–Laban) also ran for representative.

Candidate	Party	Votes	%
Antolin Oreta III	National Unity Party	84,940	45.71
Ricky Sandoval	Lakas–CMD	67,824	36.50
Bem Noel	Nationalist People's Coalition	20,578	11.07
Bernard dela Cruz	PDP–Laban	12,480	6.72
Total		185,822	100.00
Valid votes		185,822	95.71
Invalid/blank votes		8,330	4.29
Total votes		194,152	100.00
Registered voters/turnout		233,868	83.02
NUP gain from NPC			
Source: Commission on Elections

== Mandaluyong ==
Incumbent Neptali Gonzales II of the National Unity Party (NUP) retired.

The NUP nominated Gonzales' wife, former representative Alexandria Gonzales, who won the election unopposed.

Candidate	Party	Votes	%
Alexandria Gonzales	National Unity Party	141,464	100.00
Total		141,464	100.00
Valid votes		141,464	82.61
Invalid/blank votes		29,776	17.39
Total votes		171,240	100.00
Registered voters/turnout		223,624	76.57
NUP hold			
Source: Commission on Elections

== Manila ==
=== 1st district ===
Incumbent Ernix Dionisio of Lakas–CMD ran for a second term. He was previously affiliated with Asenso Manileño.

Dionisio won re-election against former representative Manny Lopez (Asenso Manileño) and two other candidates.

Candidate	Party	Votes	%
Ernix Dionisio (incumbent)	Lakas–CMD	109,838	51.15
Joseph Lumbad	Filipino Rights Protection Advocates of Manila Movement	87,183	40.60
Manny Lopez	Asenso Manileño	16,334	7.61
Edwin Santos	Independent	1,385	0.64
Total		214,740	100.00
Valid votes		214,740	95.86
Invalid/blank votes		9,265	4.14
Total votes		224,005	100.00
Registered voters/turnout		267,797	83.65
Lakas hold			
Source: Commission on Elections

=== 2nd district ===
Incumbent Rolando Valeriano of the National Unity Party ran for a third term. He was previously affiliated with Asenso Manileño.

Valeriano won the election against former representative Carlo Lopez (Nacionalista Party).

Candidate	Party	Votes	%
Rolando Valeriano (incumbent)	National Unity Party	59,865	52.74
Carlo Lopez	Nacionalista Party	53,650	47.26
Total		113,515	100.00
Valid votes		113,515	92.73
Invalid/blank votes		8,894	7.27
Total votes		122,409	100.00
Registered voters/turnout		149,095	82.10
NUP hold			
Source: Commission on Elections

=== 3rd district ===
Incumbent Joel Chua of Lakas–CMD ran for a second term. He was previously affiliated with Asenso Manileño.

Chua won re-election against city councilor Apple Nieto (Aksyon Demokratiko) and former city councilor Ramon Morales (PDP–Laban).

Candidate	Party	Votes	%
Joel Chua (incumbent)	Lakas–CMD	55,007	47.83
Apple Nieto	Aksyon Demokratiko	51,283	44.59
Ramon Morales	PDP–Laban	8,725	7.59
Total		115,015	100.00
Valid votes		115,015	93.49
Invalid/blank votes		8,014	6.51
Total votes		123,029	100.00
Registered voters/turnout		156,053	78.84
Lakas hold			
Source: Commission on Elections

=== 4th district ===
Incumbent Edward Maceda of the Nationalist People's Coalition was term-limited.

Maceda endorsed his wife, Giselle Lazaro-Maceda (Asenso Manileño), who won the election against city councilors JTV Villanueva (Aksyon Demokratiko) and Louie Chua (Independent) and former representative Trisha Bonoan-David (Independent).

Candidate	Party	Votes	%
Giselle Lazaro-Maceda	Asenso Manileño	54,446	41.75
JTV Villanueva	Aksyon Demokratiko	35,651	27.34
Louie Chua	Independent	32,937	25.26
Trisha Bonoan-David	Independent	7,371	5.65
Total		130,405	100.00
Valid votes		130,405	93.40
Invalid/blank votes		9,214	6.60
Total votes		139,619	100.00
Registered voters/turnout		172,679	80.85
Asenso Manileño gain from NPC			
Source: Commission on Elections

=== 5th district ===
Incumbent Irwin Tieng of Lakas–CMD ran for a second term. He was previously affiliated with Asenso Manileño.

Tieng won re-election against former representative Amado Bagatsing (Aksyon Demokratiko).

Candidate	Party	Votes	%
Irwin Tieng (incumbent)	Lakas–CMD	87,003	52.08
Amado Bagatsing	Aksyon Demokratiko	80,064	47.92
Total		167,067	100.00
Valid votes		167,067	92.00
Invalid/blank votes		14,529	8.00
Total votes		181,596	100.00
Registered voters/turnout		227,051	79.98
Lakas hold			
Source: Commission on Elections

=== 6th district ===
Incumbent Benny Abante of the National Unity Party ran for a third term.

Abante was defeated by city councilor Joey Uy of Aksyon Demokratiko.

Candidate	Party	Votes	%
Joey Uy	Aksyon Demokratiko	64,746	50.54
Benny Abante (incumbent)	National Unity Party	63,358	49.46
Total		128,104	100.00
Valid votes		128,104	92.60
Invalid/blank votes		10,234	7.40
Total votes		138,338	100.00
Registered voters/turnout		169,499	81.62
Source: Commission on Elections

On June 18, 2025, the Second Division of the Commission on Elections (COMELEC) annulled Uy's election due to citizenship issues, making Abante the winner. On July 7, the COMELEC sitting en banc issued its decision dated on June 30, that denied the motion for reconsideration filed by Uy and ordered that Abante be declared the winner of the election.

On July 8, Abante was proclaimed the elected representative of Manila’s 6th district and promptly assumed office, his prior term having concluded on June 30.

Candidate	Party	Votes	%
Benny Abante (incumbent)	National Unity Party	63,358	100.00
Total		63,358	100.00
Valid votes		63,358	45.80
Invalid/blank votes		74,980	54.20
Total votes		138,338	100.00
Registered voters/turnout		169,499	81.62
NUP hold			
Source: Commission on Elections

== Marikina ==
=== 1st district ===
Incumbent Maan Teodoro of the National Unity Party (NUP) retired to run for mayor of Marikina. She was previously affiliated with the United Nationalist Alliance.

The NUP nominated Teodoro's husband, Marikina mayor Marcelino Teodoro. On December 11, 2024, the First Division of the Commission on Elections (COMELEC) cancelled Marcelino's candidacy for lack of residency. However, Marcelino remained on the ballot pending a COMELEC en banc decision on his candidacy.

Marcelino Teodoro won the election against Senator Koko Pimentel (Nacionalista Party). However, Marcelino's proclamation was suspended due to the pending electoral complaint.

On June 25, 2025, the COMELEC en banc reversed the First Division's decision and lifted the suspension order on Marcelino Teodoro. Marcelino was sworn into office on July 1.

Candidate	Party	Votes	%
Marcelino Teodoro	National Unity Party	75,062	72.07
Koko Pimentel	Nacionalista Party	29,091	27.93
Total		104,153	100.00
Valid votes		104,153	97.29
Invalid/blank votes		2,901	2.71
Total votes		107,054	100.00
Registered voters/turnout		127,290	84.10
NUP hold			
Source: Commission on Elections

=== 2nd district ===
Two-term representative Stella Quimbo of Lakas–CMD is running for mayor of Marikina. She was previously affiliated with the Liberal Party.

Lakas–CMD nominated Quimbo's husband, former representative Miro Quimbo, who won the election against city councilor Donn Favis (National Unity Party) and two other candidates.

Candidate	Party	Votes	%
Miro Quimbo	Lakas–CMD	86,984	60.95
Donn Favis	National Unity Party	53,456	37.45
Mauro Arce	Independent	1,375	0.96
Jay Enage	Independent	907	0.64
Total		142,722	100.00
Valid votes		142,722	94.26
Invalid/blank votes		8,690	5.74
Total votes		151,412	100.00
Registered voters/turnout		188,690	80.24
Lakas hold			
Source: Commission on Elections

== Muntinlupa ==
Incumbent Jaime Fresnedi of the Liberal Party ran for a second term.

Fresnedi won re-election against Silverio Garing (PDP–Laban).

Candidate	Party	Votes	%
Jaime Fresnedi (incumbent)	Liberal Party	177,504	75.79
Silverio Garing	PDP–Laban	56,710	24.21
Total		234,214	100.00
Valid votes		234,214	93.43
Invalid/blank votes		16,458	6.57
Total votes		250,672	100.00
Registered voters/turnout		314,934	79.60
Liberal hold			
Source: Commission on Elections

== Navotas ==
Incumbent Toby Tiangco of Partido Navoteño ran for a second term.

Tiangco won re-election against Tony Ibañez (Independent).

Candidate	Party	Votes	%
Toby Tiangco (incumbent)	Partido Navoteño	116,622	95.57
Tony Ibañez	Independent	5,403	4.43
Total		122,025	100.00
Valid votes		122,025	94.39
Invalid/blank votes		7,249	5.61
Total votes		129,274	100.00
Registered voters/turnout		157,065	82.31
Navoteño hold			
Source: Commission on Elections

== Parañaque ==
=== 1st district ===
Incumbent Edwin Olivarez of Lakas–CMD retired to run for mayor of Parañaque. He previously affiliated with PDP–Laban.

Lakas–CMD nominated Olivarez' brother, Parañaque mayor Eric Olivarez, who won the election unopposed.

Candidate	Party	Votes	%
Eric Olivarez	Lakas–CMD	73,351	100.00
Total		73,351	100.00
Valid votes		73,351	69.55
Invalid/blank votes		32,111	30.45
Total votes		105,462	100.00
Registered voters/turnout		139,653	75.52
Lakas hold			
Source: Commission on Elections

=== 2nd district ===
Incumbent Gustavo Tambunting of the National Unity Party ran for a second term.

Tambunting was defeated by Bicol Saro party-list representative Brian Yamsuan, who ran as an independent. Three other candidates also ran for representative.

Candidate	Party	Votes	%
Brian Yamsuan	Independent	82,700	50.98
Gustavo Tambunting (incumbent)	National Unity Party	72,765	44.85
Rolando Aguilar	Independent	3,190	1.97
Florentino Baguio	Independent	1,896	1.17
Rodel Espinola	Workers' and Peasants' Party	1,680	1.04
Total		162,231	100.00
Valid votes		162,231	93.84
Invalid/blank votes		10,648	6.16
Total votes		172,879	100.00
Registered voters/turnout		213,621	80.93
Independent gain from NUP			
Source: Commission on Elections

== Pasay ==
Incumbent Antonino Calixto of Lakas–CMD ran for a third term. He was previously affiliated with PDP–Laban.

Calixto won re-election against former city councilor Onie Bayona (Aksyon Demokratiko).

Candidate	Party	Votes	%
Antonino Calixto (incumbent)	Lakas–CMD	131,640	64.18
Onie Bayona	Aksyon Demokratiko	73,463	35.82
Total		205,103	100.00
Valid votes		205,103	89.90
Invalid/blank votes		23,047	10.10
Total votes		228,150	100.00
Registered voters/turnout		292,695	77.95
Lakas hold			
Source: Commission on Elections

== Pasig ==
Incumbent Roman Romulo of the Nationalist People's Coalition ran for a third term. He was previously an independent.

Romulo won re-election against former city councilor Ian Sia (Independent). On May 7, 2025, the Commission on Elections' Second Division disqualified Sia after he made remarks deemed discriminatory against single mothers and body-shamed his former chief of staff while campaigning.

Candidate	Party	Votes	%
Roman Romulo (incumbent)	Nationalist People's Coalition	348,939	95.40
Ian Sia	Independent	16,829	4.60
Total		365,768	100.00
Valid votes		365,768	94.74
Invalid/blank votes		20,289	5.26
Total votes		386,057	100.00
Registered voters/turnout		463,885	83.22
NPC hold			
Source: Commission on Elections

== Quezon City ==
=== 1st district ===
Incumbent Arjo Atayde of the Nacionalista Party ran for a second term. He was previously an independent.

Atayde won re-election against former representative Vincent Crisologo (Partido Federal ng Pilipinas).

Candidate	Party	Votes	%
Arjo Atayde (incumbent)	Nacionalista Party	93,999	58.53
Vincent Crisologo	Partido Federal ng Pilipinas	66,606	41.47
Total		160,605	100.00
Valid votes		160,605	95.57
Invalid/blank votes		7,444	4.43
Total votes		168,049	100.00
Registered voters/turnout		217,676	77.20
Nacionalista hold			
Source: Commission on Elections

=== 2nd district ===
Incumbent Ralph Tulfo of the Partido Federal ng Pilipinas ran for a second term. He was previously an independent.

Tulfo won re-election against three other candidates.

Candidate	Party	Votes	%
Ralph Tulfo (incumbent)	Partido Federal ng Pilipinas	185,164	81.70
Virgil Garcia	Independent	31,412	13.86
Francisco Palma	Independent	6,432	2.84
Roel Bernido	Independent	3,638	1.61
Total		226,646	100.00
Valid votes		226,646	87.90
Invalid/blank votes		31,190	12.10
Total votes		257,836	100.00
Registered voters/turnout		328,316	78.53
PFP hold			
Source: Commission on Elections

=== 3rd district ===
Incumbent Franz Pumaren of the National Unity Party ran for a second term.

Pumaren won re-election against former representative Allan Benedict Reyes (Partido Federal ng Pilipinas).

Candidate	Party	Votes	%
Franz Pumaren (incumbent)	National Unity Party	73,946	56.10
Allan Benedict Reyes	Partido Federal ng Pilipinas	57,874	43.90
Total		131,820	100.00
Valid votes		131,820	94.60
Invalid/blank votes		7,519	5.40
Total votes		139,339	100.00
Registered voters/turnout		172,497	80.78
NUP hold			
Source: Commission on Elections

=== 4th district ===
Incumbent Marvin Rillo of Lakas–CMD ran for a second term.

Rillo was defeated by former representative Bong Suntay of the United Nationalist Alliance).

Candidate	Party	Votes	%
Bong Suntay	United Nationalist Alliance	91,856	50.07
Marvin Rillo (incumbent)	Lakas–CMD	91,617	49.93
Total		183,473	100.00
Valid votes		183,473	94.84
Invalid/blank votes		9,985	5.16
Total votes		193,458	100.00
Registered voters/turnout		234,450	82.52
UNA gain from Lakas			
Source: Commission on Elections

=== 5th district ===
Incumbent PM Vargas of Lakas–CMD ran for a second term. He was previously affiliated with PDP–Laban.

Vargas won re-election against four other candidates.

Candidate	Party	Votes	%
Patrick Michael Vargas (incumbent)	Lakas–CMD	104,266	50.06
Rose Lin	Independent	92,984	44.65
Rose de Guzman	Workers' and Peasants' Party	6,112	2.93
Fidela Mallari	Independent	3,078	1.48
Angel Rustia Jr.	Independent	1,829	0.88
Total		208,269	100.00
Valid votes		208,269	93.94
Invalid/blank votes		13,436	6.06
Total votes		221,705	100.00
Registered voters/turnout		281,197	78.84
Lakas hold			
Source: Commission on Elections

=== 6th district ===
Incumbent Marivic Co-Pilar of the National Unity Party won re-election for a second term unopposed.

Candidate	Party	Votes	%
Marivic Co-Pilar (incumbent)	National Unity Party	141,794	100.00
Total		141,794	100.00
Valid votes		141,794	83.31
Invalid/blank votes		28,405	16.69
Total votes		170,199	100.00
Registered voters/turnout		220,275	77.27
NUP hold			
Source: Commission on Elections

== San Juan ==
Incumbent Ysabel Zamora (Lakas–CMD) is running for a second term. She was elected in 2022 under PDP–Laban with 64.52% of the vote.

Zamora is running against former San Juan councilor Jana Ejercito (Pwersa ng Masang Pilipino).

Candidate	Party	Votes	%
Ysabel Zamora (incumbent)	Lakas–CMD	44,545	66.54
Jana Ejercito	Pwersa ng Masang Pilipino	22,403	33.46
Total		66,948	100.00
Valid votes		66,948	94.55
Invalid/blank votes		3,861	5.45
Total votes		70,809	100.00
Registered voters/turnout		100,639	70.36
Lakas hold			
Source: Commission on Elections

== Taguig–Pateros ==
Taguig is divided into two city council districts; for purposes of congressional representation, the 1st district is combined with Pateros.

=== Taguig–Pateros ===
Following the transfer of the jurisdiction over the Embo barangays from Makati to Taguig in 2023, the district was expanded in 2024 to include the barangays of Comembo, Pembo and Rizal.

Incumbent Ading Cruz of the Nacionalista Party ran for a second term.

Cruz won re-election against former Taguig mayor Lino Cayetano (Nationalist People's Coalition), former Barangay Palingon-Tipas chairman Allan Cerafica (Partido Federal ng Pilipinas) and two other candidates. On October 28, 2024, the Commission on Elections (COMELEC) rejected the transfer of Cayetano's registration to the Taguig–Pateros district. Cayetano remains on the ballot pending a final COMELEC verdict.

Candidate	Party	Votes	%
Ading Cruz (incumbent)	Nacionalista Party	118,205	46.07
Lino Cayetano	Nationalist People's Coalition	79,064	30.82
Allan Cerafica	Partido Federal ng Pilipinas	54,971	21.43
Peter dela Cruz	Independent	2,692	1.05
Ricardo Opoc	Independent	1,637	0.64
Total		256,569	100.00
Valid votes		256,569	92.40
Invalid/blank votes		21,115	7.60
Total votes		277,684	100.00
Registered voters/turnout		345,062	80.47
Nacionalista hold			
Source: Commission on Elections

=== Taguig ===
Following the transfer of the jurisdiction over the Embo barangays from Makati to Taguig in 2023, the district was expanded in 2024 to include the barangays of Cembo, East Rembo, Pitogo, Post Proper Northside, Post Proper Southside, South Cembo and West Rembo.

Incumbent Pammy Zamora of Lakas–CMD ran for a second term. She was previously affiliated with the Nacionalista Party.

Zamora was defeated by Taguig Liga ng mga Barangay president Jorge Daniel Bacobo of the Nacionalista Party. Noe Manila (Independent) also ran for representative.

Candidate	Party	Votes	%
Jorge Daniel Bacobo	Nacionalista Party	144,014	53.62
Pammy Zamora (incumbent)	Lakas–CMD	116,489	43.37
Noe Manila	Independent	8,095	3.01
Total		268,598	100.00
Valid votes		268,598	92.63
Invalid/blank votes		21,371	7.37
Total votes		289,969	100.00
Registered voters/turnout		373,322	77.67
Nacionalista gain from Lakas			
Source: Commission on Elections

== Valenzuela ==
=== 1st district ===
The seat is vacant after Rex Gatchalian of the Nationalist People's Coalition (NPC) resigned on January 31, 2023, upon his appointment as Secretary of Social Welfare and Development.

The NPC nominated Gatchalian's brother, Kenneth Gatchalian, who won the election against Tony Espiritu (Aksyon Demokratiko) and Jing Hernandez (Independent), both former Valenzuela vice mayors.

Candidate	Party	Votes	%
Kenneth Gatchalian	Nationalist People's Coalition	80,410	49.45
Tony Espiritu	Aksyon Demokratiko	79,629	48.96
Jing Hernandez	Independent	2,586	1.59
Total		162,625	100.00
Valid votes		162,625	94.88
Invalid/blank votes		8,784	5.12
Total votes		171,409	100.00
Registered voters/turnout		210,330	81.50
NPC hold			
Source: Commission on Elections

=== 2nd district ===
Term-limited incumbent Eric Martinez ran for the Senate as an independent. He was previously affiliated with PDP–Laban.

Martinez endorsed his wife, Kat Martinez of the National Unity Party, who was defeated by city councilor Gerald Galang (Independent).

Candidate	Party	Votes	%
Gerald Galang	Independent	95,878	54.36
Kat Martinez	National Unity Party	80,490	45.64
Total		176,368	100.00
Valid votes		176,368	96.63
Invalid/blank votes		6,160	3.37
Total votes		182,528	100.00
Registered voters/turnout		228,226	79.98
Independent hold			
Source: Commission on Elections
