= 2016 Manila local elections =

17th Mayoral election in the City of Manila

2016 Manila mayoral election
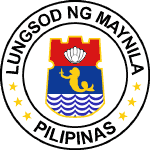
- May 9, 2016
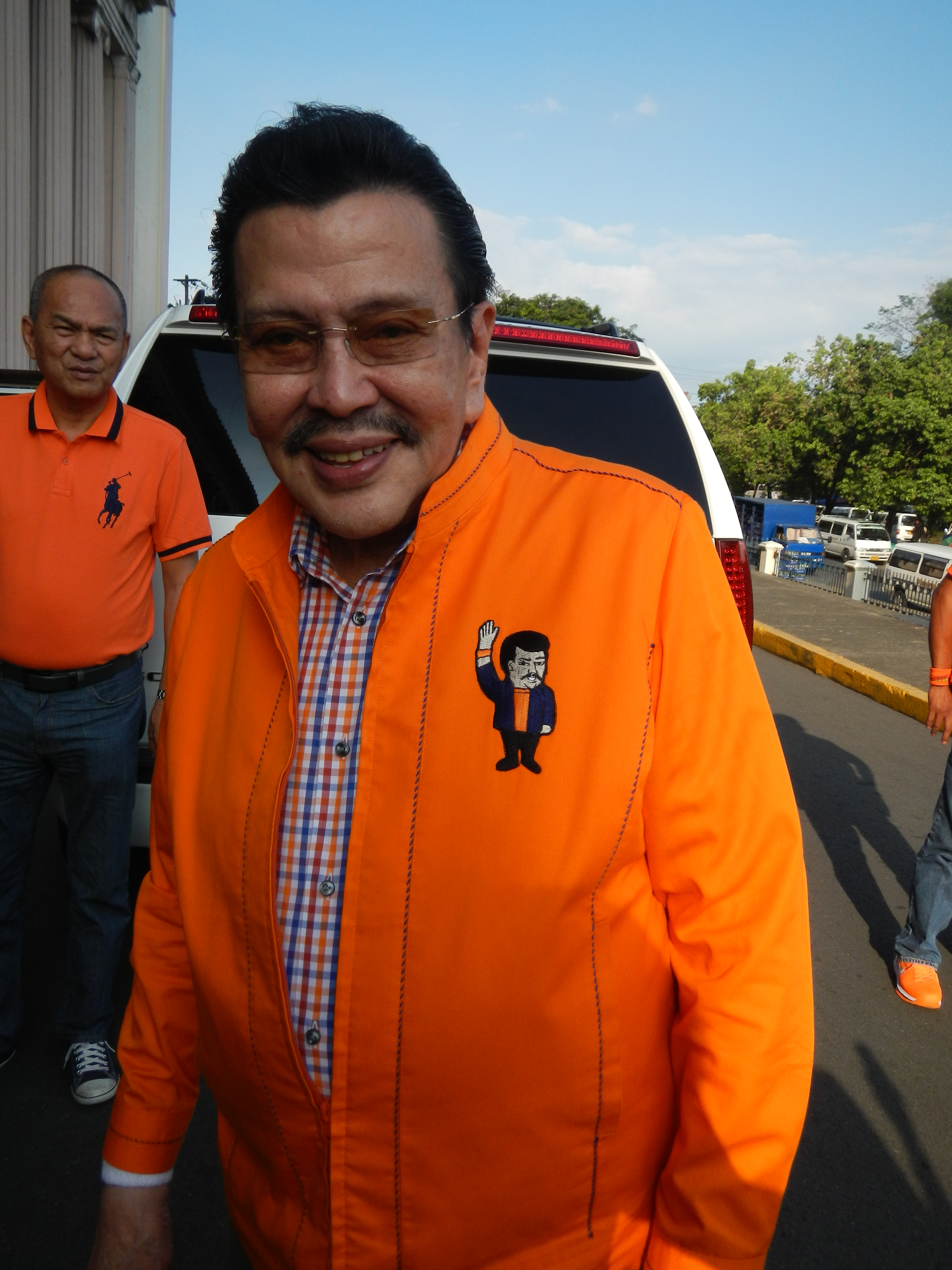

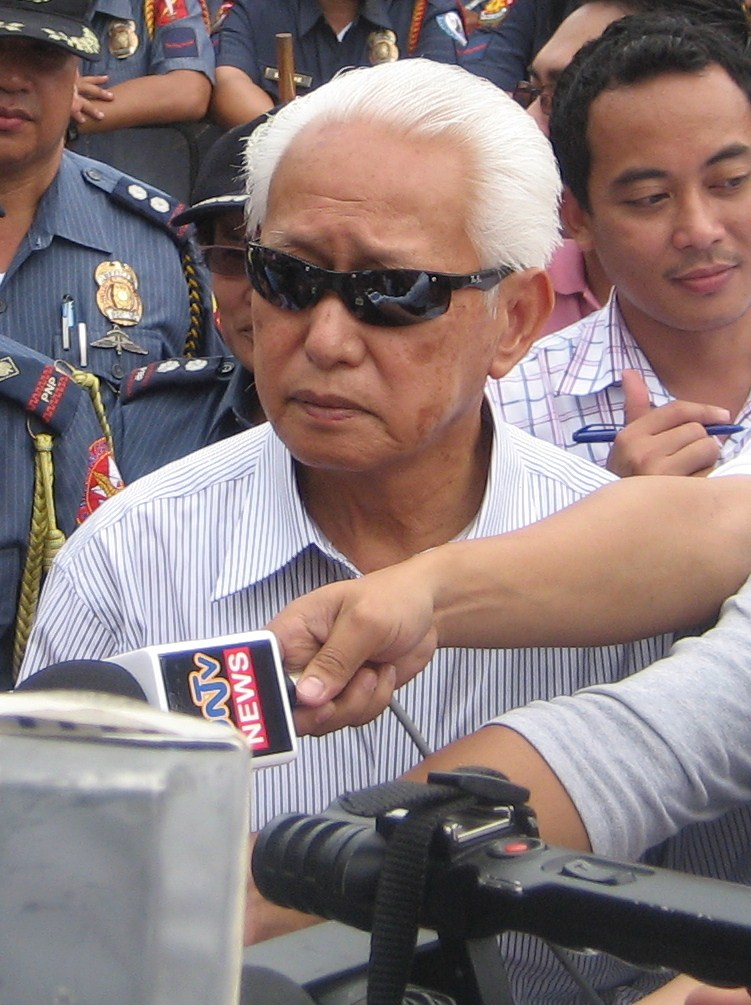

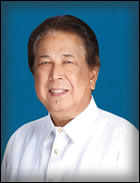
Nominee	Joseph Estrada	Alfredo Lim	Amado Bagatsing
Party	PMP	Liberal	KABAKA
Alliance	Sulong Maynila	KKK	Bagong Maynila
Running mate	Honey Lacuna	Ali Atienza (Note: Lim originally picked Atong Asilo as running-mate, but Asilo later dropped by Lim and the latter supported and picked Ali Atienza of UNA (who also Amado Bagatsing's running-mate).)	Ali Atienza
Popular vote	283,149	280,464	167,829
Percentage	38.54%	38.17%	22.84%
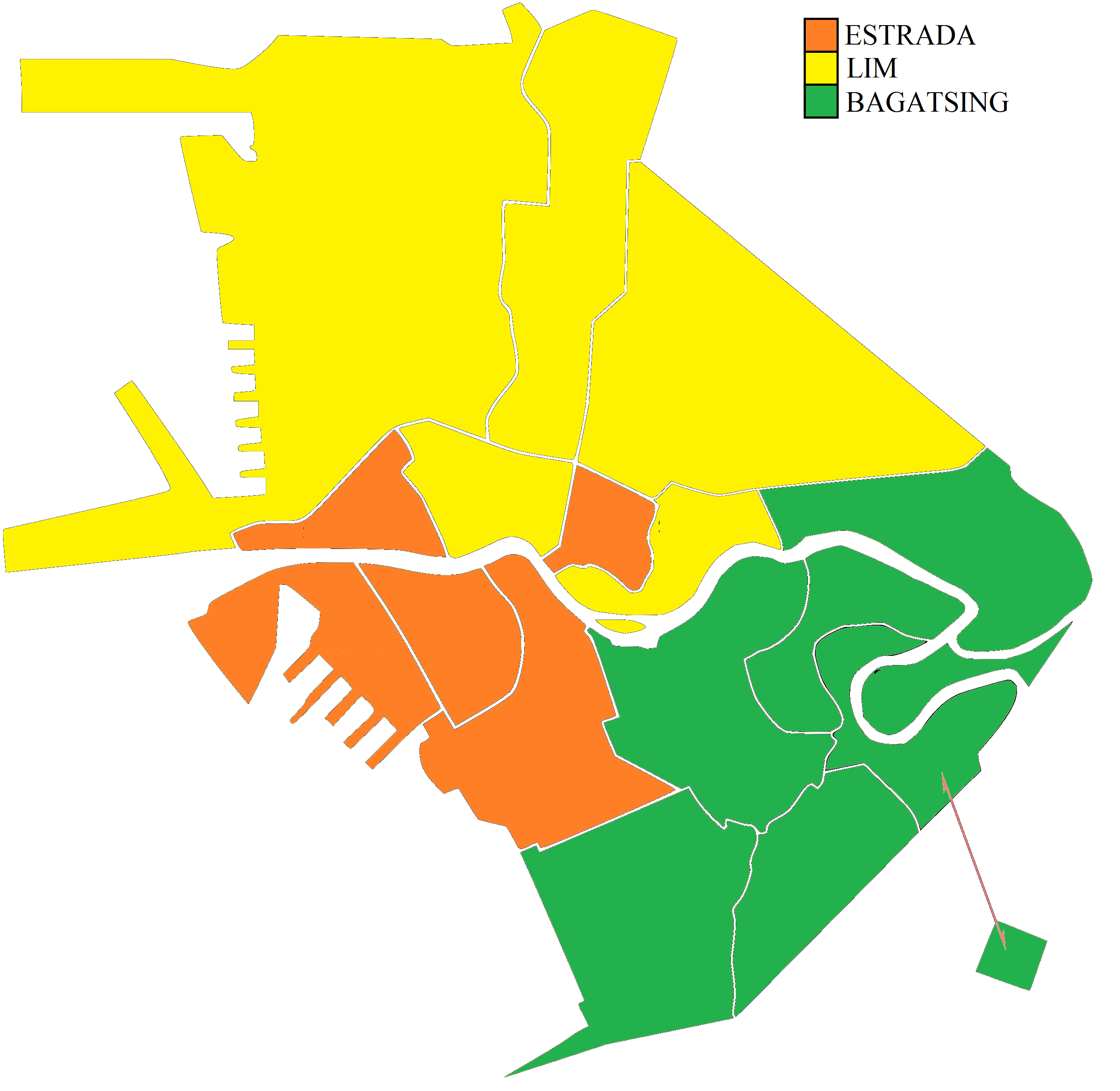
Mayor before election
Joseph Estrada
PMP
Elected mayor
Joseph Estrada
PMP
- Vice mayoral election
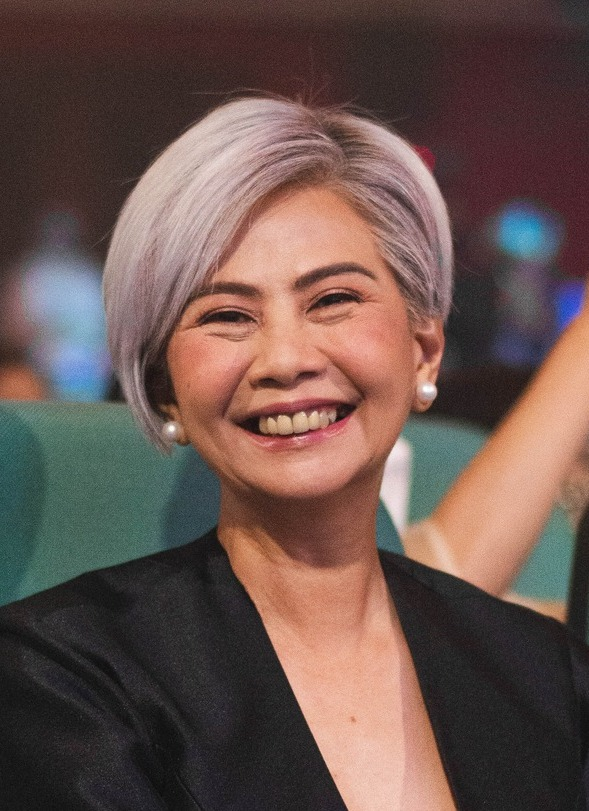
Candidate	Honey Lacuna	Ali Atienza	Benjamin Asilo
Party	Asenso	UNA	Liberal
Alliance	Sulong Maynila	Bagong Maynila	N/A (Note: As being originally picked by Alfredo Lim as his running mate, Benjamin Asilo belong to Lim's KKK, but did not have any alliance after being dropped by the latter.)
Popular vote	268,969	221,037	137,388
Percentage	37.91%	31.15%	19.36%
Vice Mayor before election
Isko Moreno
PMP/Asenso
Elected Vice Mayor
Honey Lacuna
Asenso
- City Council election

36 of 38 seats in the Manila City Council 20 seats needed for a majority
	First party	Second party	Third party
Party	Asenso Manileño	Liberal	KABAKA
Alliance	Sulong Maynila	KKK	Bagong Maynila
Last election	Did not participate (Note: Asenso Manileño's candidates were labeled as members of UNA in the ballot, thus no Asenso candidate did not stand outside UNA)	6	1
Seats won	24	3	1
Seat change	▲24	▼3	1
Popular vote	1,611,970	539,799	386,218
Percentage	44.11%	14.77%	10.57%

Local elections were held in Manila on May 9, 2016, as a part of the 2016 Philippine general election. Voters elected candidates for mayor, vice mayor, six congressmen, and the 36 councilors that would be members of the city council. Incumbent mayor Joseph Estrada won the elections, securing him to serve his second three-year term as the mayor of Manila. He won by a slim margin at only more than 2,000 votes against his closest rival, former Manila mayor Alfredo Lim. Dr. Maria Sheilah “Honey” Lacuna-Pangan, daughter of former Manila vice mayor Danny Lacuna, Estrada's running-mate, topped the vice mayoral race with 268,969 votes.

== Background ==
Incumbent mayor and former president Joseph "Erap" Estrada was first elected as mayor in 2013. He defeated then-incumbent mayor Alfredo Lim in a closely contested election, winning 53% of the vote to Lim's 47%.

Estrada announced in April 2015 that he would be running for re-election. This was in total contrast to his May 9, 2012 pronouncement that he would only serve for one term should he be elected to the post back then, after which he would subsequently retire from politics.

Unlike Estrada, his running mate in 2013, three-term incumbent vice mayor Isko Moreno was term-limited, as he had served for three consecutive terms. He instead ran for a seat in the Senate.

Sources indicated that although Manila leaders identified with Estrada under the local Asenso Manileño party, Moreno included, were pushing for former Manila vice mayor Danny Lacuna to be his running mate, Estrada was said to have seriously considered his current city administrator, Jojo Alcovendaz, to be his vice mayoral candidate under his party, despite the latter's San Juan residence. However, the Estrada camp, upon further consultation, eventually chose former 4th district councilor and city social services head Honey Lacuna, Danny's daughter, as his running mate.

On July 22, 2015, incumbent 5th district representative Amado Bagatsing launched his bid to be the next mayor of the city once governed by his father, former mayor Ramon Bagatsing, offering himself as an alternative while blaming the city's "deterioration" on the incumbent and his predecessor. His running mate was the son of former mayor and current Buhay Party-list Representative Lito Atienza, current 5th district councilor and 2007 mayoral candidate Ali Atienza. On October 12, 2015, Bagatsing made his bid official by filing his certificate of candidacy.

On October 13, 2015, Alfredo Lim filed to run again for his old post. He was the official candidate of the ruling Liberal Party. His running mate was incumbent 1st district Rep. Benjamin Asilo.

== Campaign ==
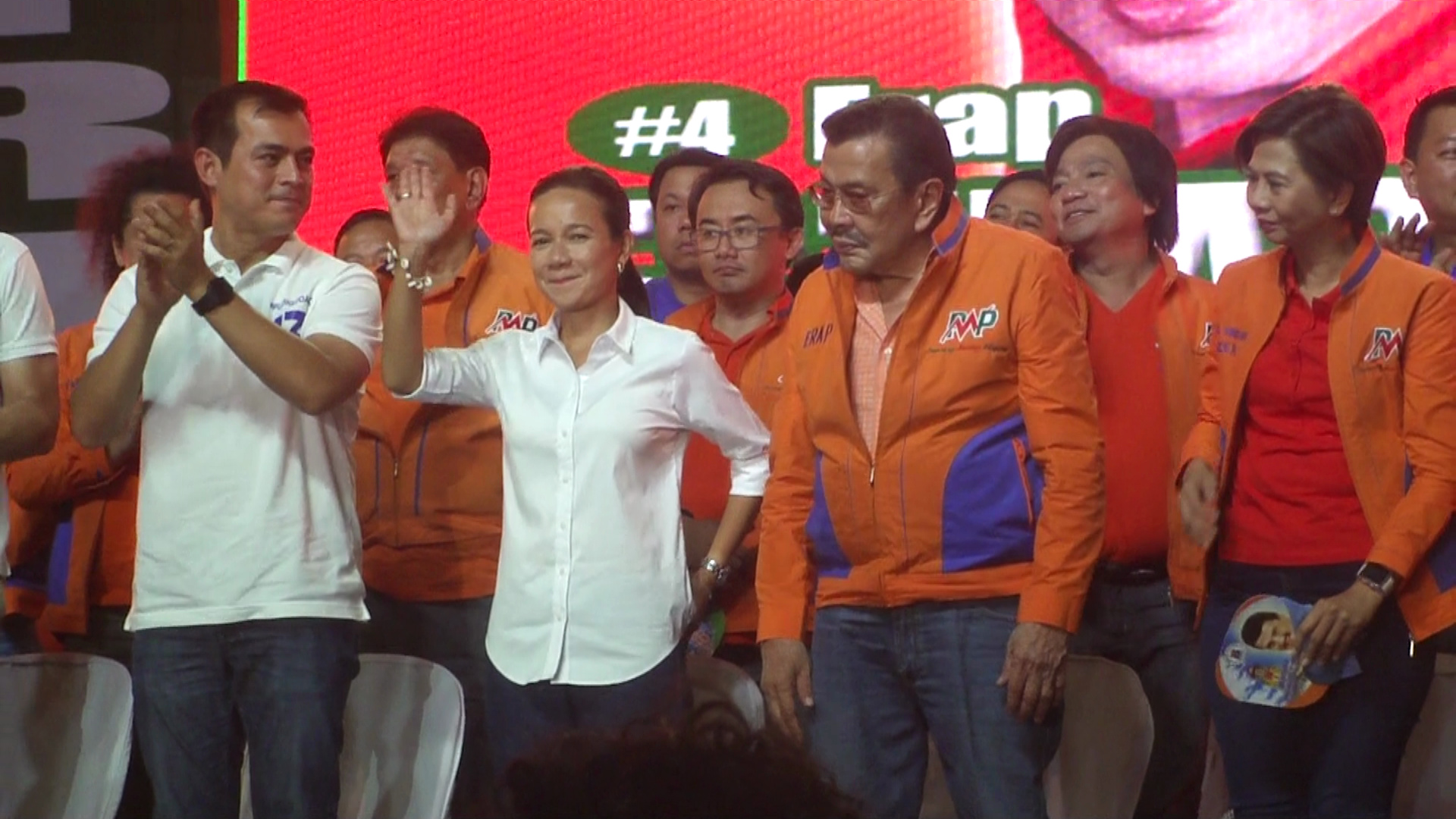
Joseph Estrada's (second from right) election campaign rally in Tondo, Manila along with Isko Moreno (left), Grace Poe (second from left)

The local campaign period started on March 26, 2016. Estrada, with running mate Honey Lacuna, held their proclamation rally at the Liwasang Bonifacio, while Lim, with running mate Benjamin Asilo started their campaign at Plaza Miranda, on March 28, 2016, two days after the official start of campaigning for local candidates.

During the incumbent mayor's rally, Estrada formally endorsed his goddaughter Grace Poe as his choice for president and Bongbong Marcos for vice president. He picked Poe over his running mate Jejomar Binay of the United Nationalist Alliance. He said that the mayor's gratitude to the presidential candidate's father Fernando Poe, Jr., a candidate of the 2004 Philippine presidential election but later lost, as one of the reasons why he made the decision to endorse Poe.

Among Estrada's senatorial candidates that he supported were Joel Villanueva, Panfilo Lacson, Manny Pacquiao, Martin Romualdez, Getulio Napeñas, Neri Colmenares, Sherwin Gatchalian, Richard J. Gordon, Migz Zubiri, Sergio Osmeña III, Francis Tolentino and Isko Moreno, the incumbent vice mayor of the city. Major roads in Manila including the MacArthur Bridge were closed down due to the event.

Lim's campaign started with his visit to the Islamic Center in San Miguel, together with Liberal Party's presidential bet Mar Roxas. The two then went to Plaza Miranda for the former mayor's proclamation rites, which was attended by 5,000 supporters. Roxas' running mate Leni Robredo and President Benigno Aquino III also attended the rally.

A day before the two rallies, Amado Bagatsing and his running mate Ali Atienza kicked-off their campaign in Tondo.

On April 27, 2016, Alfredo Lim asked his running mate, Benjamin Asilo, to withdraw from the vice mayoral race due to low survey standings, replacing him with Ali Atienza, who is already the running mate of Amado Bagatsing. Asilo declined to withdraw, choosing to continue his campaign even without a mayoral running mate.

== Mayoralty and vice mayoralty elections ==
=== Mayor ===
First-term incumbent and former president Joseph Estrada, who was elected with 53% of the vote in 2013, sought another term. Former senator and Manila mayor Alfredo Lim, who Estrada defeated in 2013, sought a rematch. Fifth District Representative Amado Bagatsing also ran.

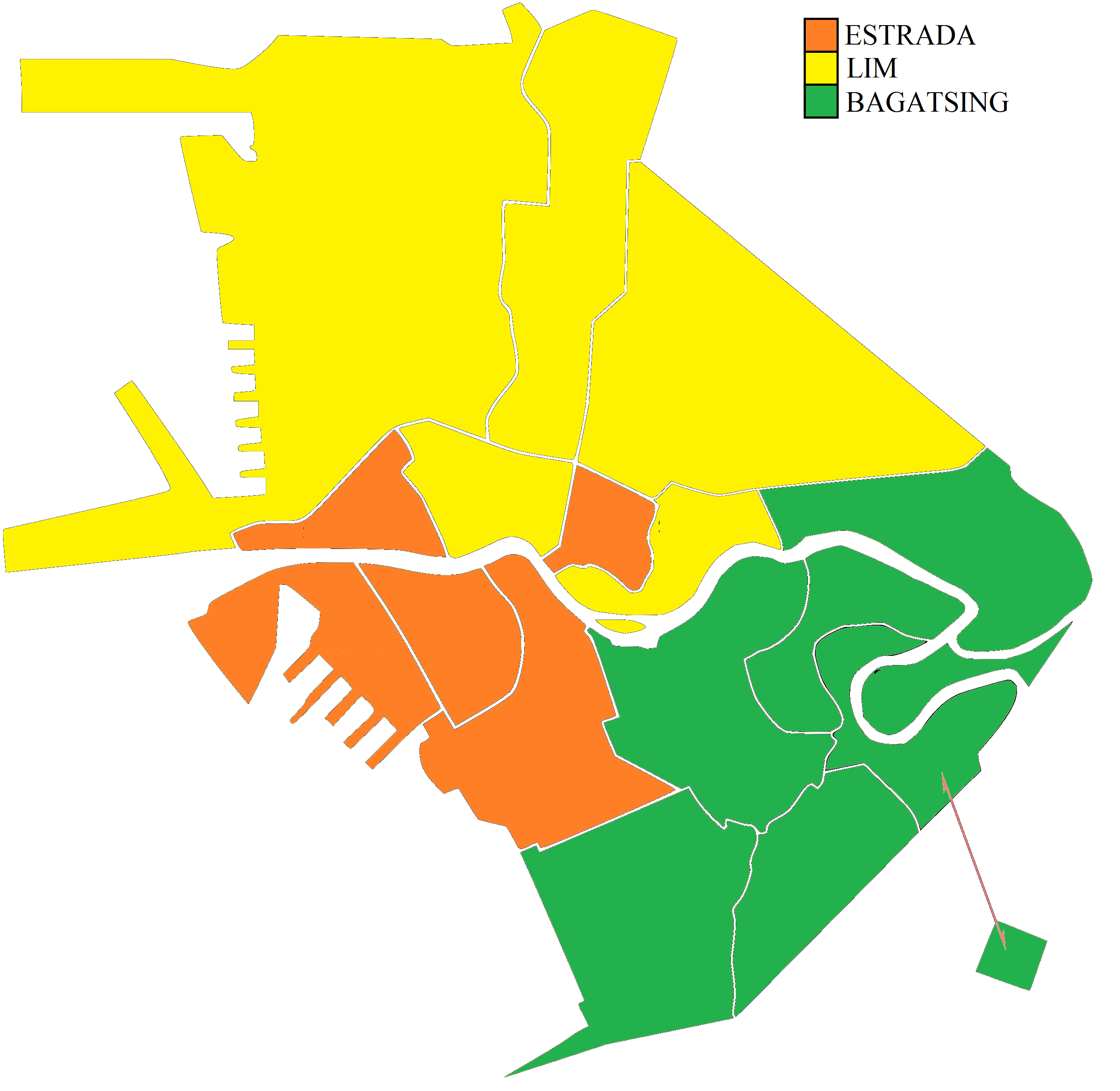
Mayoralty race in Manila during 2016 general election

Manila Mayoralty Election
Party	Candidate	Votes	%
PMP	Mayor. Joseph "Erap" Estrada (Incumbent)	283,149	38.54
Liberal	Former Mayor. Alfredo "Fred" Lim	280,464	38.18
KABAKA	Cong. Amado Bagatsing (Incumbent)	167,829	22.85
Independent	Onofre Abad	717	0.09
Independent	Valeriano Reloj	621	0.08
Independent	Arnaldo "Dodos" Dela Cruz	479	0.06
Independent	Edmundo Fuerte	456	0.06
Independent	Tranquilino Narca	275	0.03
Independent	Wilfredo Yusi	223	0.03
WPP	Francisco Pizzara	222	0.03
Independent	Samuel Gabot	206	0.02
Total votes		734,613	100.00
PMP hold			

=== Vice mayor ===
Three-term incumbent Francisco "Isko Moreno" Domagoso, who was re-elected with 63% of the vote in 2013, was term-limited and barred from running again for this post this election. His party's nominee was Maria Sheilah "Honey" Lacuna-Pangan. Facing her were three-term representatives Benjamin Asilo of the 1st district and Trisha Bonoan-David of the 4th district. Incumbent 5th District councilor and former 2007 mayoral candidate Ali Atienza also ran for the seat.

Manila Vice Mayoralty Election
Party	Candidate	Votes	%
Asenso	Coun. Maria Sheilah "Honey" Lacuna-Pangan (Incumbent)	268,969	37.91
UNA	Coun. Arnold "Ali" Atienza (Incumbent)	221,037	31.15
Liberal	Cong. Benjamin "Atong" Asilo (Incumbent)	137,388	19.36
NUP	CongW. Atty. Trisha "VM" Bonoan (Incumbent)	77,599	10.93
Independent	Luis Reyes, Jr.	4,393	0.61
Total votes		709,386	100.00
Asenso hold			

== District representatives ==
=== 1st district ===
The 1st district is composed of the western part of Tondo. Three-term Liberal incumbent Benjamin "Atong" Asilo, who was re-elected with 64% of the vote in 2013, was term-limited and instead ran for vice mayor; his brother, incumbent councilor Roberto Asilo, was his party's nominee.

Also running for this district were incumbent three-term councilors Ian "Banzai" Nieva and Ernesto Dionisio Jr. as well as Manuel "Manny" Lopez. Nieva is the son of the late Ernesto "Banzai" Nieva, who represented this district from 1998 to 2007, while Lopez is the son of former Manila mayor Mel Lopez.

2016 Philippine House of Representatives election in the 1st District of Manila
Party	Candidate	Votes	%
NPC	Manuel Luis "Manny" Lopez	55,627	35.35
Liberal	Roberto Asilo	43,640	27.73
Asenso	Ernesto Dionisio, Jr.	42,878	27.25
Independent	Erick Ian Nieva	15,223	9.67
Total votes		157,368	100.00
NPC gain from Liberal			

=== 2nd district ===
The city's 2nd district covers the eastern part of Tondo, a place known as Gagalangin. Carlo Lopez was the incumbent representative and had already served two terms. He won on the 2010 local elections and was re-elected with 69% of the vote in 2013. He ran for his third and final term under the Liberal Party. He ran unopposed because his supposed opponent, Councilor Numero "Uno" Lim, was nominated by the party-list group Tanggol Maralita Inc. (TAMA).

2016 Philippine House of Representatives election in the 2nd District of Manila
Party	Candidate	Votes	%
Liberal	Carlo Lopez	72,409	100.00
Total votes		72,409	100.00
Liberal hold			

=== 3rd district ===
The 3rd district is composed of Binondo, Quiapo, San Nicolas, and Santa Cruz. Zenaida "Naida" Angping, who was re-elected with 62% of the vote in 2013, was term-limited and barred from running again this election. Her party nominated her husband, former representative Harry Angping who represented this district from 1998 to 2004.

His opponents were three-term incumbent city councilor and actor John Marvin "Yul Servo" Nieto and former councilor Ramon Morales. Morales also ran in this district in 2013 and lost receiving only 36% of the vote.

2016 Philippine House of Representatives election in the 3rd District of Manila
Party	Candidate	Votes	%
Asenso	John Marvin "Yul Servo" Nieto	46,353	44.93
Nacionalista	Harry Angping	38,636	37.44
Liberal	Ramon Morales	17,021	16.50
Independent	Ricardo Lee	689	0.67
Independent	Edgardo "Jojo" Ruiz	472	0.46
Total votes		103,183	100.00
Asenso gain from NPC			

=== 4th district ===
The 4th district is composed of Sampaloc. Ma. Theresa "Trisha" Bonoan-David, who ran unopposed in 2013, was term-limited and barred from running again this election. Her party nominated her sister, Annie.

Other candidates for this district were six-term councilor Edward Maceda, two-term councilor Don Juan "DJ" Bagatsing, one-term councilor Science Reyes, and former Ateneo basketball player Jobe Nkemakolam.

2016 Philippine House of Representatives election in the 4th District of Manila
Party	Candidate	Votes	%
Asenso	Atty. Edward Maceda	46,349	41.53
KABAKA	Don Juan "DJ" Bagatsing	23,807	21.28
Independent	Science Reyes	23,650	21.25
NUP	Rosemary "Ate Annie" Leilani Bonoan	16,525	14.81
PDP–Laban	Jobe Sherwin Nkemakolam	1,263	1.13
Total votes		111,594	100.00
Asenso gain from NUP			

=== 5th district ===
The 5th district is composed of Ermita, Malate, Paco (south), Intramuros, Port Area, and San Andres Bukid (including the Manila South Cemetery). Amado Bagatsing, who was re-elected with 89% of the vote in 2013, was term-limited and barred from running again this election and instead ran for mayor. His party's nominee was his daughter Cristal.

Her opponents were former representatives Joey Hizon and Mary Ann Susano as well as incumbent three-term councilor Josie Siscar. Joey Hizon represented this district from 1998 to 2007. Meanwhile, Mary Ann Susano represented Quezon City's 2nd congressional district from 2004 to 2010.

2016 Philippine House of Representatives election in the 5th District of Manila
Party	Candidate	Votes	%
KABAKA	Amanda Christina Bagatsing	48,380	37.40
PMP	Joey Hizon	34,952	27.02
NPC	Mary Ann Susano	27,083	20.93
Liberal	Josefina Siscar	16,420	12.69
PDP–Laban	Jupakar Arabani	1,882	1.45
WPP	Mario Cayabyab	655	0.51
Total votes		129,372	100%
KABAKA hold			

=== 6th district ===
The 6th district is composed of Paco (north), Pandacan, Santa Ana, San Miguel, and Santa Mesa. Two-term incumbent Sandy Ocampo, who won re-election in 2013 with 51% of the vote, sought a third term. She was co-nominated by NUP and local party KABAKA while Benny Abante was also co-nominated by Asenso Manileño Party.

This is the third straight election in which the two candidates faced each other with Ocampo winning the first two by narrow margins.

2016 Philippine House of Representatives election in the 6th District of Manila
Party	Candidate	Votes	%
Liberal	Rosenda Ann "Sandy" Ocampo	56,844	53.41
Asenso	Benny M. Abante	48,260	45.35
Independent	Richard Bautista	695	0.65
Independent	Jose Castillo	623	0.59
Total votes		106,422	100.00
Liberal hold			

== City council ==
Party	Votes	%	Seats
Asenso Manileño	1,611,970	44.11	24
Liberal	539,799	14.77	3
Kabalikat ng Bayan sa Kaunlaran	386,218	10.57	1
Pwersa ng Masang Pilipino	274,688	7.52	1
United Nationalist Alliance	227,703	6.23	3
Nationalist People's Coalition	129,112	3.53	0
Nacionalista	62,117	1.70	1
Ang Kapatiran	56,418	1.54	1
Aksyon	43,211	1.18	0
PDP–Laban	28,910	0.79	0
Lakas–CMD	4,493	0.12	0
Independent	290,106	7.94	2
Ex officio seats			2
Total	3,654,745	100.00	38

=== 1st district ===
Incumbent councilors Dennis Alcoreza, Ernesto Dionisio Jr., and Erick Ian Nieva were term-limited and could not seek re-election. Meanwhile, councilors Irma Alfonso and Roberto Asilo, who were not term-limited, chose not to seek re-election. Of the six councilors representing this district, only Niño dela Cruz sought re-election.

Former councilors Rolando Sy, Jesus Fajardo Sr., Ernesto Dionisio Sr., Arlene Koa, Moises Lim, Martin Isidro Jr., and Abraham Cabochan each tried to regain a seat in the council.

2016 Manila City Council election at the 1st district
Party	Candidate	Votes	%
Asenso	Ernesto G. Dionisio, Sr.	87,218	10.40
Independent	Moises "Bobby" Lim	68,448	8.16
Asenso	Martin Isidro, Jr.	62,704	7.48
Asenso	Jesus "Taga" Fajardo, Sr.	59,472	7.09
Liberal	Niño dela Cruz	50,831	6.06
Liberal	Peter Ong	50,480	6.02
PMP	Diosdado "Boroboy" Santiago	46,428	5.54
Asenso	Ava Cristina "Ava Alfonso" Juson	44,941	5.36
KABAKA	Jose "Tito Joveth" Asayo	40,618	4.84
PMP	Mina "Banzai" Nieva	37,227	4.44
KABAKA	Rosalino Garcia	33,269	3.97
Liberal	Rolando "Nagmamahal" Sy	32,356	3.86
KABAKA	Arlene Koa	32,324	3.85
Independent	Alexander Dionisio	30,852	3.68
KABAKA	Edgardo Solis	22,694	2.70
Independent	Randy Sy	21,024	2.50
KABAKA	Victor "Toto" Baldisimo	20,995	2.50
Asenso	Abraham "Baby" Cabochan	17,610	2.10
Liberal	Jonas Arriza Humady	12,261	1.46
KABAKA	Ligfinia "Teacher Beth" Lorenzo	9,863	1.17
Asenso	Edna "Puti" Ramos	8,725	1.04
Liberal	Jeniffer "Jade" Daquiz	8,712	1.03
PMP	Michael "Mike/Nash" de Leon	6,680	0.79
Independent	Francisca Villanueva	6,639	0.79
Liberal	Rafael "Dok" Manicad	5,831	0.69
UNA	Ferdinand Sandoval	5,465	0.65
Independent	Jose Brendo Macapaz	5,131	0.61
Independent	Juan Rafael "Raffy Jimenez" Crespo	2,872	0.34
Independent	Cresenciano "Kuya Boy" Gabuten, Jr.	2,586	0.30
Independent	Allan Navoa	1,977	0.23
PDP–Laban	Eduardo Lanuza	1,747	0.20
Total votes		173,640	100.00

=== 2nd District ===
Incumbent councilors Marlon Lacson and Numero Lim could not seek re-election. Councilors Ruben Buenaventura, Rodolfo Lacsamana, Ramon Robles, and Rolando Valeriano were all seeking another term.

Among those vying for a seat in the council were former councilors Edward Tan and Nelissa Beltran.

2016 Manila City Council election at the 2nd district
Party	Candidate	Votes	%
Asenso	Rolando "Rolan CRV" Valeriano	53,986	10.95
Asenso	Ruben "Dr. J" Buenaventura	49,450	10.03
Asenso	Ramon Robles	49,218	9.98
UNA	Rodolfo "Ninong" Lacsamana	47,524	9.64
Asenso	Edward Tan	47,156	9.56
Asenso	Macky Lacson	38,570	7.82
NPC	Darwin "Awi" Sia	36,418	7.38
Asenso	Babyluck "Algebra" Lim	35,543	7.21
UNA	Nelissa Beltran	31,828	6.45
NPC	Nancy Valencia	26,258	5.32
NPC	Fernando "Bok" Lopez	19,060	3.86
Liberal	Ruben "RP" Bunag	14,618	2.96
Liberal	JC "Brad Bolong" Sy	12,769	2.59
UNA	Ariel Fernandez	7,354	1.49
Lakas	Rommel Miranda	4,493	0.91
Independent	Jules delos Reyes	3,486	0.70
Liberal	Maria Corazon Panlilio	3,482	0.70
Liberal	Michael "Tuts" Velasco	2,886	2.58
Independent	Alex Lao	2,739	0.55
Independent	Ned Ordenes	2,104	0.42
Independent	Pedro Buluran, Jr.	2,033	0.41
Independent	Pedro Garcia	1,913	0.38
Total votes		103,565	100.00

=== 3rd District ===
Incumbent councilors Joel Chua, Ernesto Isip Jr., and John Marvin "Yul Servo" Nieto were term-limited and could not seek re-election. Meanwhile, councilors Bernardito Ang, Ma. Asuncion Fugoso, and Manuel Zarcal were all vying for another term.

2016 Manila City Council election at the 3rd district
Party	Candidate	Votes	%
Asenso	Maria Asuncion "Re" Fugoso	67,663	12.86
Asenso	Bernardito Ang	54,269	10.32
Asenso	Manuel "Letlet" Zarcal	51,252	9.74
UNA	Maile Atienza	50,279	9.56
Asenso	Grace Chua	46,183	8.78
Asenso	Terrence Alibarbar	38,993	7.41
NPC	Chris "Attorney CB" Beltran	36,342	6.91
Liberal	Joey Uy Jamisola	28,836	5.48
Liberal	RJ Yuseco	22,789	4.33
Liberal	Rizalindo "Major Saling" Morales	18,794	3.57
Liberal	Marilou Chua	17,635	3.35
KABAKA	William Lising	16,613	3.15
Asenso	Alberto "Abet Tabako" Alonzo	15,929	3.02
KABAKA	Maria Victoria "Binky" Barbers	14,641	2.78
Liberal	Mar Reyes	13,123	2.49
KABAKA	Philip Chua	10,085	1.91
Independent	Severino Reyes	6,989	1.32
Independent	Wilson Ng	4,054	0.77
Liberal	Jesus Abejar	3,115	0.59
Independent	Jerry Gomez	2,928	0.55
Independent	Mohammad "Madz" Ameril	2,175	0.41
Independent	Rhady Siongco	1,947	0.37
Independent	Esmail Codarangan	1,209	0.22
Total votes		111,266	100.00

=== 4th district ===
Incumbent councilors Edward Maceda and Jocelyn Quintos were term-limited and could not seek re-election. Meanwhile, councilors Don Juan Bagatsing, and Science Reyes, who were not term-limited, chose not to seek re-election. Councilors Krystle Bacani and Anton Capistrano both vyed for a second term.

Among those who were gunning for a council seat were former councilors Luisito Chua, Eduardo "Wardee" Quintos XIV, and Victoriano Melendez. Eduardo 'Bimbo' Quintos XVI would not run for councilor due to his disqualification case in the office.

2016 Manila City Council election at the 4th district
Party	Candidate	Votes	%
Asenso	Luisito Chua	66,510	
Asenso	Krystle Bacani	64,151	
Independent	Anton Capistrano	48,529	
Liberal	Eduardo "Bimbo" Quintos XVI	47,840	
Asenso	Eduardo "Wardee" Quintos XIV	46,252	
Asenso	Joel "JTV" Villanueva	46,205	
Asenso	Angelita Calalang	38,368	
KABAKA	Victoriano Melendez	37,473	
KABAKA	Allan Dale Basco	23,247	
Liberal	Joseph Silva	21,625	
UNA	Christopher Ortiz	17,030	
Liberal	Jerome Chua	15,069	
PMP	Francisco Mariazeta	14,183	
Independent	Ramoncito Reyes	11,915	
KABAKA	Augusto Antonio	11,120	
Liberal	Katrina Rigor	10,307	
KABAKA	Marc Chester Regala	9,037	
Liberal	Pedro Galero	5,073	
Independent	Alexander Lim	4,960	
Independent	Zenaida Matias	4,850	
Independent	Virgilio Cornejo	4,493	
Independent	Rodolfo Astorga	3,839	
Independent	Antonio Abana	3,581	
Independent	Vicente Salgado	2,618	
Total votes			

=== 5th district ===
Incumbent councilors Cristina Isip, Josefina Siscar, and Raymundo Yupangco were barred by term limits from seeking re-election. Meanwhile, councilor Arnold Atienza, who was not term-limited, chose not to seek another term. Councilors Joey Hizon III and Roberto Ortega Jr. both vied for another term.

Among those who sought a council seat were former councilors Richard Ibay, Roderick Valbuena, and Arturo Valenzona. Three-term Buhay Party-list Rep. Irwin Tieng also ran for a council seat in this district.

2016 Manila City Council election at the 5th district
Party	Candidate	Votes	%
UNA	William Irwin Tieng	68,223	
Asenso	Roberto Ortega, Jr.	64,412	
PMP	Laris Borromeo	62,694	
Nacionalista	Joey "TJ" Hizon III	62,117	
Asenso	Ricardo "Boy" Isip, Jr.	50,231	
Asenso	Anna Katrina Puzon-Yupangco	49,556	
Asenso	Richard Ibay	45,858	
KABAKA	Roderick Valbuena	32,606	
PMP	Gina Ragasa-Veniegas	23,788	
Asenso	Bobby Espiritu	23,295	
KABAKA	Harry Huecas	23,004	
KABAKA	Francis Villegas	21,504	
KABAKA	Edward Ramirez	20,538	
KABAKA	Jose Abrito	18,642	
Liberal	Felix Tobillo, Jr.	15,765	
PDP–Laban	Paulino Ejercito	15,741	
PDP–Laban	Erika Angela Platon	11,422	
Liberal	Jaime Co, Jr.	10,286	
Liberal	Mark Andaya	8,953	
Liberal	Dominador Mariano	7,831	
NPC	Geoffrey Dela Torre	7,553	
Liberal	Ariel Dakis	7,045	
Liberal	Abner Afuang	6,764	
Independent	John Dizon	5,780	
Independent	Jaime Adriano	4,200	
Independent	Gladina Villar	3,662	
NPC	Marlon Villarojas	2,611	
Independent	Turo Valenzona	2,353	
Independent	Eric Dolloso	1,838	
Independent	Rufino Cantil, Jr.	1,296	
Independent	Wenifredo Limit	1,222	
NPC	Fernando Perito	870	
Total votes			

=== 6th district ===
Incumbent councilors Priscilla Marie Abante, Leilani Marie Lacuna, Joel Par, Elizabeth Rivera, Casimiro Sison, and Christian Paul Uy all sought another term.

Among those who ran for a council seat were former councilors Carlos Castañeda, Pablo Dario Ocampo, and Luciano Veloso. Castañeda served in the city council as the president of the Liga ng mga Barangay from 2004 to 2007, while Ocampo represented the 5th district from 1995 to 1998.

2016 Manila City Council election at the 6th district
Party	Candidate	Votes	%
KABAKA	Christian Paul "Joey" Uy	61,914	11.09
Asenso	Priscilla Marie Abante	61,007	10.93
Asenso	Elizabeth Rivera	59,840	10.72
Asenso	Casimiro Sison	57,656	10.33
Asenso	Carlos Castañeda	56,979	10.20
Ang Kapatiran	Joel Par	56,418	10.10
Asenso	Leilani Marie Lacuna	52,768	9.45
Liberal	Lou Veloso	50,555	9.05
Aksyon	Pablo Dario "Chikee" Ocampo IV	43,211	7.74
Liberal	Jeremiah "My" Belgica	28,747	5.15
KABAKA	Edward Quintos	9,719	1.74
Liberal	Irene Rillo	5,421	0.97
Independent	Angel Agub	4,352	0.77
Independent	Jesus "Jessie Delgado" Porciuncula	3,559	0.63
Independent	Emmanuel Gonzales	2,531	0.45
Independent	Lardi Lardizabal	1,923	0.34
Independent	Lynne Orqueza	1,499	0.26
Total votes		113,196	100.00
