= Amado Bagatsing =

Filipino politician (born 1947)

Amado S. Bagatsing
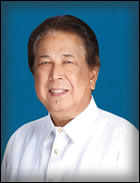
- Official portrait during the 16th Congress of the Philippines

Head of the Committee on Reclamation of Manila
- Incumbent
- Assumed office June 3, 2026
- Appointed by: Isko Moreno
- Preceded by: Position created

Member of the Philippine House of Representatives from Manila's 5th congressional district
- In office June 30, 1987 – June 30, 1998
- Preceded by: Position created
- Succeeded by: Joey Hizon
- In office June 30, 2007 – June 30, 2016
- Preceded by: Joey Hizon
- Succeeded by: Cristal Bagatsing

Personal details
- Born: Amado Sevilla Bagatsing; December 3, 1947 (age 78) Sampaloc, Manila, Philippines
- Citizenship: Filipino
- Party: Aksyon (2024–present); KABAKA (local party; 1987–present)
- Other political affiliations: NUP (2011–2016); Lakas–Kampi (2007–2011); LAMMP (1998); LDP (1987–1998); KBL (until 1987)
- Spouse: Rosario La'O-Bagatsing
- Children: 4 (including Cristal)
- Parents: Ramon D. Bagatsing, Sr. (father); Juanita H. Sevilla-Bagatsing (mother)
- Relatives: Ramon "Don Don" S. Bagatsing, Jr. (brother); Ramon "Boy" B. Bagatsing, Jr. (half-brother); Don Juan Bagatsing (nephew); Raymond Bagatsing (half-nephew); RK Bagatsing (half-nephew)
- Education: University of Manila
- Occupation: Politician, businessman
- Profession: Lawyer

Amado Sevilla Bagatsing (born December 3, 1947) is a Filipino lawyer, businessman, politician, and philanthropist who is the head of Manila's Committee on Reclamation since 2026. He previously served as the representative of Manila's 5th district from 1987 until 1998 and from 2007 to 2016. He is also the founding president of Kabalikat ng Bayan sa Kaunlaran (KABAKA).

== Life ==
Bagatsing was born on December 3, 1947, to Ramon Bagatsing, who would later serve as representative and mayor of Manila, and second wife Juanita Sevilla. He is the brother of former ambassador to India Dondon Bagatsing.

== Career ==
Bagatsing served as chairman of the Chamber of Real Estate & Builders' Associations, Inc. (CREBA) Council of Leaders and its National President in 1981, 1982, and 1986.

Bagatsing became the representative of Manila's 5th district in 1987, and served until 1998. In the early 2000s, Bagatsing served as vice chairman of the Housing and Urban Development Coordinating Council (HUDCC) and initiated a project for more than 2,000 families of soldiers and uniformed personnel at Bonifacio Heights in Taguig.

He attempted to run for mayor in 1998, picking former Vice Mayor Danny Lacuna as his running mate. Lacuna won but Bagatsing lost to incumbent Lito Atienza. A week after the 1998 election, Bagatsing and two other defeated mayoral candidates unsuccessfully petitioned the Supreme Court to disqualify Atienza for allegedly violating the Omnibus Election Code after illegally disbursing ₱3.375 million in public funds to public school teachers during the campaign period. He ran again in 2001, picking again Lacuna as his running mate, but still lost to Atienza.

He returned to Congress in 2007, and served for three terms until 2016. In 2016, he ran again for mayor, with Ali Atienza as running mate, but lost to another incumbent and former president Joseph Estrada. In 2019, he ran for vice mayor as the running mate of Estrada, but both suffered defeat to the tandem of former Vice Mayor Isko Moreno and the then-incumbent Vice Mayor Honey Lacuna.

In 2022, he attempted to run again as mayor, even without a running mate, but lost to incumbent Vice Mayor Honey Lacuna.

In 2025, Bagatsing ran for congressman in the 5th district of Manila under former Mayor Isko Moreno's slate named Yorme's Choice. However, he lost to incumbent Irwin Tieng, losing the congressional race for the first time.

On June 3, 2026, Bagatsing was appointed by Mayor Isko Moreno as the first head of Manila's Committee on Reclamation.

== Controversy ==
In 2014, Bagatsing was implicated in the pork barrel scam, facing accusations of receiving ₱600,000 in kickbacks linked to Janet Lim-Napoles, according to the ledger of whistleblower Benhur Luy. Graft complaints were filed against him and 9 others with the Office of the Ombudsman on August 7, 2015. However, Napoles denied the allegations against him. Bagatsing filed a perjury complaint against Napoles, challenging the validity of her accusations, and argued that his implication in the scandal was politically motivated.

== Election campaigns ==
=== 2025 ===
2025 Philippine House of Representatives election at Manila's 5th district
Party	Candidate	Votes	%
Lakas	Irwin Tieng	87,003	52.08
Aksyon	Amado Bagatsing	80,064	47.92
Total votes		167,067	100.00
Lakas hold			

=== 2022 ===
Manila Mayoral Election
Party	Candidate	Votes	%
Asenso	Honey Lacuna	538,595	63.68
PFP	Alexander Lopez	166,908	19.74
KABAKA	Amado Bagatsing	118,694	14.03
Reporma	Cristina Lim-Raymundo	14,857	1.76
PRP	Elmer Jamias	4,057	0.48
Independent	Onofre Abad	2,618	0.31
Total votes		845,729	100.00
Asenso hold			

=== 2019 ===
Manila Vice Mayoralty Election
Party	Candidate	Votes	%
Asenso	Honey Lacuna (incumbent)	394,766	57.28
KABAKA	Amado Bagatsing	267,286	38.78
Independent	Elmer Jamias	13,876	2.01
Independent	Severino Reyes	6,438	0.93
Independent	Butch Cosme	3,894	0.56
Independent	Virgilio Añonuevo	2,828	0.33
Total votes		689,088	100.00
Asenso hold			

=== 2016 ===
Manila Mayoralty Election
Party	Candidate	Votes	%
PMP	Joseph "Erap" Estrada	283,149	38.54
Liberal	Alfredo Lim	280,464	38.18
KABAKA	Amado Bagatsing	167,829	22.85
Independent	Onofre Abad	717	0.09
Independent	Valeriano Reloj	621	0.08
Independent	Arnaldo "Dodos" Dela Cruz	479	0.06
Independent	Edmundo Fuerte	456	0.06
Independent	Tranquilino Narca	275	0.03
Independent	Wilfredo Yusi	223	0.03
WPP	Francisco Pizzara	222	0.03
Independent	Samuel Gabot	206	0.02
Total votes		734,613	100.00
PMP hold			

=== 2013 ===
2013 Philippine House of Representatives election at Manila's 5th district
Party	Candidate	Votes	%
KABAKA	Amado Bagatsing	94,966	89.05
NPC	Faith Maganto	10,380	9.73
KBL	Mario Cayabyab	1,293	1.21
Total votes		106,639	100.00
KABAKA hold			

=== 2010 ===
2010 Philippine House of Representatives elections
Party	Candidate	Votes	%
Lakas–Kampi	Amado Bagatsing	70,852	59.04
Nacionalista	Joey Hizon	47,902	39.92
Independent	Rodicindo Yee Rodriguez II	626	0.52
Independent	Jayson Española	618	0.52
Valid ballots		119,998	92.92
Invalid or blank votes		9,148	7.08
Total votes		129,147	100.00
Lakas–Kampi hold			

=== 2001 ===
Manila Mayoral election
Party	Candidate	Votes	%
Liberal	Lito Atienza	255,021	43.81
KKK	Alfredo Lim	199,070	34.20
KABAKA	Amado Bagatsing	127,394	21.88
Independent	Imelda Apostol	196	0.03
Independent	Onofre Abad	157	0.03
Independent	Benjamin Rivera	144	0.02
Independent	Antonio Gamo	136	0.02
Total votes		582,118	100.00
Liberal hold			
