= Cristal Bagatsing =

Filipino politician

Head of the Department of Tourism, Culture, and Arts of Manila Officer in Charge
- Incumbent
- Assumed office June 30, 2025
- Mayor: Isko Moreno
- Preceded by: Charlie DJ Dungo

Member of the Philippine House of Representatives from Manila's 5th congressional district
- In office June 30, 2016 – June 30, 2022
- Preceded by: Amado Bagatsing
- Succeeded by: Irwin Tieng

Personal details
- Born: Amanda Cristina La'O Bagatsing
- Citizenship: Filipino
- Party: KABAKA (2016–present)
- Other political affiliations: National Unity Party (2018–2022)
- Parents: Amado Bagatsing (father); Rosario La'O (mother)
- Relatives: Ramon D. Bagatsing, Sr. (grandfather); Ramon "Don Don" S. Bagatsing, Jr. (uncle), Ramon "Boy" B. Bagatsing, Jr. (half-uncle), Ramon "Raymond" S. Bagatsing, III (half-cousin)
- Occupation: Politician

Amanda Cristina "Cristal" L. Bagatsing sometimes misspelled as Amanda Christina "Cristal" La'O Bagatsing, is a Filipino politician serving as the officer in charge of the Department of Tourism, Culture, and Arts of Manila since 2025. She previously served as representative of Manila's 5th congressional district from 2016 until 2022. She is the daughter of former congressman of the same district Amado Bagatsing.

== Career ==
Bagatsing succeeded her father Amado Bagatsing in his congressional seat at Manila's 5th congressional district in 2016, after winning in a six-way race (with one of them is former congressman Joey Hizon). Her candidacy was motivated by a signature campaign from constituents advocating for a successor to continue her father's initiatives, as she had assisted her father with youth-oriented programs and projects. She was also a member of the House Committee for Women and Gender Equality and is a co-author of the SOGIE Equality Bill.

She ran for 2nd term in 2019 under KABAKA and PDP–Laban and won, defeating councilor Ali Atienza. She ran for 3rd term in 2022 under KABAKA and National Unity Party, but lost to councilor Irwin Tieng of Asenso Manileño by an estimate of 3,000 votes.

In 2025, she was appointed officer in charge of the Department of Tourism, Culture, and Arts of Manila under the second administration of Mayor Isko Moreno.

== Electoral performance ==
Electoral history of Cristal Bagatsing
Year	Office	Party	Votes received				Result
Year	Office	Party	Total	%	P.	Swing	Result
2016	Representative (Manila–5th)	KABAKA	48,380	37.40	1st	—N/a	Won
2019	Representative (Manila–5th)	KABAKA	65,836	50.41	1st	+13.01	Won
2022	Representative (Manila–5th)	NUP	80,045	49.01	2nd	-1.40	Lost
