= Irwin Tieng =

Filipino politician and businessman (born 1980)

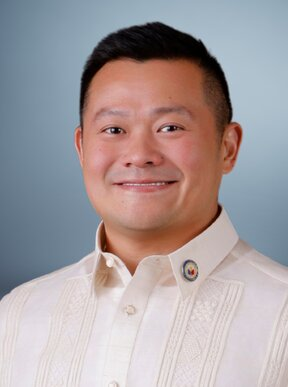
- Official portrait, 2026

Member of the Philippine House of Representatives from Manila's 5th congressional district
- Incumbent
- Assumed office June 30, 2022
- Preceded by: Cristal Bagatsing

Member of the Manila City Council from 5th district
- In office June 30, 2016 – June 30, 2022

Member of the Philippine House of Representatives for Buhay Party-List
- In office June 30, 2007 – June 30, 2016

Personal details
- Born: William Irwin Chua Tieng; November 21, 1980 (age 46) Quezon City, Philippines
- Party: NUP (2026–present); Asenso Manileño (local party; 2021–present)
- Other political affiliations: Lakas (2022–2026); Aksyon (2021–2022); Independent (2018–2021); UNA (2012–2018); Buhay (partylist; 2007–2016)
- Education: De La Salle–College of Saint Benilde (BS); Ateneo de Manila University (MBA)
- Occupation: Politician, businessman

William Irwin Chua Tieng (born November 21, 1980) is a Filipino politician and businessman. He is currently serving as representative of the 5th district of Manila since 2022. He is currently a member of the National Unity Party and the Asenso Manileño local party. A member of the Tieng family of businessmen, he was first elected to Congress as a Buhay Party-List representative in 2007.

As a partylist representative, Tieng authored a house bill reducing the amusement tax imposed on local films from 30% to 10% that was signed into law in 2009, culminating more than two decades of attempts to lower the film tax.

== Early life and education ==
Tieng was born on November 21, 1980, in Quezon City to William Y. Tieng and Aida Tieng (née Chua). He studied De La Salle–College of Saint Benilde with the degree of Business Administration and took up the master's degree at the Ateneo de Manila University, where he finished with the degree of Master of Business Administration.

== Political career ==
In 2007, Tieng won as nominee for the Buhay Party-List, eventually serving for three consecutive terms. In December 2009, a Tieng-authored house bill that reduced the amusement tax imposed on local films from 30% to 10% was signed into law as Republic Act No. 9640, culminating more than two decades of attempts to lower the film tax.

In 2016, Tieng became a member of Manila City Council from the fifth district. He was re-elected to his second term in 2019.

In 2022, Tieng was elected to represent the fifth district of Manila, unseating incumbent Cristal Bagatsing. He is the first person from outside the Hizon and Bagatsing families to represent the district since its creation. He was re-elected in 2025, defeating former representative Amado Bagatsing.

== Personal life ==
In 2018, Tieng is married to Ladylyn Riva and has two children.

== Electoral history ==
Electoral history of Irwin Tieng
Year	Office	Party		Votes received				Result
Year	Office	Local	National	Total	%	P.	Swing	Result
2007	Representative (Party-list)	—N/a	Buhay	1,169,234	7.33%	1st	+1.75	Won
2010	Representative (Party-list)	—N/a	Buhay	1,250,467	4.16%	3rd	−3.14	Won
2013	Representative (Party-list)	—N/a	Buhay	1,270,608	4.59%	1st	+0.33	Won
2016	Councilor (Manila–5th district)	—N/a	UNA	68,223	—N/a	1st	—N/a	Won
2019	Councilor (Manila–5th district)	—N/a	Independent	79,940	—N/a	1st	—N/a	Won
2022	Representative (Manila–5th district)	Asenso Manileño	Aksyon	83,286	50.99%	1st	—N/a	Won
2025	Representative (Manila–5th district)	Asenso Manileño	Lakas	87,003	52.08%	1st	—N/a	Won
