= Manila's 5th congressional district =

Philippines legislative district

- Constituency for the House of Representatives of the Philippines
- Boundary of Manila's 5th congressional district in Manila
- Location of Manila within Metro Manila
- City: Manila
- Region: Metro Manila
- Population: 395,065 (2020)
- Electorate: 227,051 (2025)
- Major settlements: 6 city districts: Ermita; Intramuros; Malate; Port Area; San Andres; south Paco
- Area: 11.56 km^{2} (4.46 sq mi)

Current constituency
- Created: 1987
- Representative: William Irwin C. Tieng
- Political party: Asenso Manileño; NUP
- Congressional bloc: Majority

Manila's 5th congressional district is one of the six congressional districts of the Philippines in the city of Manila. It has been represented in the House of Representatives of the Philippines since 1987. The district consists of barangays 649 to 828 in the south Manila districts of Ermita, Intramuros, Malate, Port Area, San Andres and south Paco. It is currently represented in the 20th Congress by William Irwin C. Tieng of Asenso Manileño and National Unity Party.

This district also includes the Manila City Hall and Manila South Cemetery, an exclave of Manila surrounded by Makati, within its borders.

== Representation history ==
#	Image	Member	Term of office		Congress	Party	Electoral history	Constituent LGUs
#	Image	Member	Start	End	Congress	Party	Electoral history	Constituent LGUs
=== Manila's 5th district for the House of Representatives of the Philippines ===
District created February 2, 1987.
1		Amado Bagatsing	June 30, 1987	June 30, 1998	8th	LDP (KABAKA)	Elected in 1987.	1987–present Ermita, Intramuros, Malate, Port Area, San Andres, south Paco (Barangays 649–828)
1		Amado Bagatsing	June 30, 1987	June 30, 1998	9th	LDP (KABAKA)	Re-elected in 1992.	1987–present Ermita, Intramuros, Malate, Port Area, San Andres, south Paco (Barangays 649–828)
1		Amado Bagatsing	June 30, 1987	June 30, 1998	10th	LDP (KABAKA)	Re-elected in 1995.	1987–present Ermita, Intramuros, Malate, Port Area, San Andres, south Paco (Barangays 649–828)
2		Joey Hizon	June 30, 1998	June 30, 2007	11th	Liberal	Elected in 1998.	1987–present Ermita, Intramuros, Malate, Port Area, San Andres, south Paco (Barangays 649–828)
2		Joey Hizon	June 30, 1998	June 30, 2007	12th	Liberal	Re-elected in 2001.	1987–present Ermita, Intramuros, Malate, Port Area, San Andres, south Paco (Barangays 649–828)
2		Joey Hizon	June 30, 1998	June 30, 2007	13th	LDP	Re-elected in 2004.	1987–present Ermita, Intramuros, Malate, Port Area, San Andres, south Paco (Barangays 649–828)
2		Joey Hizon	June 30, 1998	June 30, 2007	13th	Nacionalista	Re-elected in 2004.	1987–present Ermita, Intramuros, Malate, Port Area, San Andres, south Paco (Barangays 649–828)
(1)		Amado Bagatsing	June 30, 2007	June 30, 2016	14th	KAMPI (KABAKA)	Elected in 2007.	1987–present Ermita, Intramuros, Malate, Port Area, San Andres, south Paco (Barangays 649–828)
(1)		Amado Bagatsing	June 30, 2007	June 30, 2016	15th	NUP (KABAKA)	Re-elected in 2010.	1987–present Ermita, Intramuros, Malate, Port Area, San Andres, south Paco (Barangays 649–828)
(1)		Amado Bagatsing	June 30, 2007	June 30, 2016	16th	NUP (KABAKA)	Re-elected in 2013.	1987–present Ermita, Intramuros, Malate, Port Area, San Andres, south Paco (Barangays 649–828)
3		Cristal Bagatsing	June 30, 2016	June 30, 2022	17th	PDP–Laban (KABAKA)	Elected in 2016.	1987–present Ermita, Intramuros, Malate, Port Area, San Andres, south Paco (Barangays 649–828)
3		Cristal Bagatsing	June 30, 2016	June 30, 2022	18th	NUP (KABAKA)	Re-elected in 2019.	1987–present Ermita, Intramuros, Malate, Port Area, San Andres, south Paco (Barangays 649–828)
4		Irwin Tieng	June 30, 2022	Incumbent	19th	Lakas (Asenso Manileño)	Elected in 2022.	1987–present Ermita, Intramuros, Malate, Port Area, San Andres, south Paco (Barangays 649–828)
4		Irwin Tieng	June 30, 2022	Incumbent	20th	NUP (Asenso Manileño)	Re-elected in 2025.	1987–present Ermita, Intramuros, Malate, Port Area, San Andres, south Paco (Barangays 649–828)

== Election results ==
=== 2025 ===
Candidate	Party	Votes	%
Irwin Tieng (incumbent)	Lakas–CMD	87,003	52.08
Amado Bagatsing	Aksyon Demokratiko	80,064	47.92
Total		167,067	100.00
Lakas–CMD hold			

=== 2022 ===
2022 Philippine House of Representatives election in the 5th District of Manila
Party	Candidate	Votes	%
Asenso	Irwin Tieng	83,286	50.99
NUP	Cristal Bagatsing (incumbent)	80,045	49.01
Total votes		163,331	100.00
Asenso gain from NUP			

=== 2019 ===
2019 Philippine House of Representatives elections
Party	Candidate	Votes	%
KABAKA	Cristal Bagatsing (incumbent)	65,836	50.41
Lakas	Ali Atienza	64,748	49.59
Total votes		130,584	100.00
KABAKA hold			

=== 2016 ===
2016 Philippine House of Representatives election in the 5th District of Manila
Party	Candidate	Votes	%
KABAKA	Cristal Bagatsing	48,380	37.40
PMP	Joey Hizon	34,952	27.02
NPC	Mary Ann Susano	27,083	20.93
Liberal	Josefina Siscar	16,420	12.69
PDP–Laban	Jupakar Arabani	1,882	1.45
WPP	Mario Cayabyab	655	0.51
Total votes		129,372	100%
KABAKA hold			

=== 2013 ===
2013 Philippine House of Representatives election at Manila's 5th district
Party	Candidate	Votes	%
KABAKA	Amado Bagatsing	94,966	89.05
NPC	Faith Maganto	10,380	9.73
KBL	Mario Cayabyab	1,293	1.21
Total votes		106,639	100.00
KABAKA hold			

=== 2010 ===
2010 Philippine House of Representatives elections
Party	Candidate	Votes	%
Lakas–Kampi	Amado Bagatsing	70,852	59.04
Nacionalista	Joey Hizon	47,902	39.92
Independent	Rodicindo Yee Rodriguez II	626	0.52
Independent	Jayson Española	618	0.52
Valid ballots		119,998	92.92
Invalid or blank votes		9,148	7.08
Total votes		129,147	100.00
Lakas–Kampi hold			

== See also ==
- Legislative districts of Manila
