= Ma. Carissa Coscolluela =

Filipino humanitarian and politician

Maria Carissa Oledan Coscolluela is a Filipino humanitarian, civic leader, and politician. She was a member of the 14th Congress of the Philippines from 2007 to 2010. She has served as the vice chairperson and member of the board of trustees of the Cultural Center of the Philippines since 2024. She is also the vice chairperson of the Philippine Red Cross and has been an elected member of its board of governors since 2011.

== Early life and career ==
Coscolluela was born on November 16, 1972 in Manila, Philippines to Ricardo Coscolluela and Maria Erlinda Oledan. She graduated from the International School Manila in 1990 and had her B.A in Interdisciplinary Studies from the Ateneo de Manila University in 1994.

After graduating from university, Coscolluela worked as the Vice President for External Affairs of the Subic Bay Waterfront Development Corporation, and became the founding President of the Subic Bay Tourism Association. She volunteered as a convenor of various community initiatives of the Subic Bay Metropolitan Authority under the administration of Dick Gordon.

In 2001, Coscolluela served as the chief of staff of Gordon when the latter became the Secretary of the Department of Tourism under President Gloria Macapagal Arroyo. Coscolluela served concurrently as the OIC Director of the Office of Tourism Information., When Gordon was elected to the Senate of the Philippines in 2004, Coscolluela served briefly as his chief of staff.

During the national elections of 2007, Coscolluela was nominated by Buhay Party-List as its second nominee. Coscolluela became a member of the 14th Congress. As a congresswoman, Coscolluela authored and sponsored legislation on economy, humanitarian work, tourism, and other advocacies. Coscolluela funded numerous projects in Central Luzon through congressional initiatives which led to her designation as an Adopted Daughter of Olongapo City.

In March 2024, Coscolluela was appointed by President Bongbong Marcos, as a member of the Board of Trustees of the Cultural Center of the Philippines.

== Legacy ==
=== Humanitarian work ===
Coscolluela sits on the board of governors of the Philippine Red Cross. During the COVID-19 pandemic, Coscolluela steered the organization's vaccination programs.

=== Sports leadership ===
Coscolluela has served as the chef d'equipe of numerous Philippine national teams to regional championships since 1992 such as the Southeast Asian Games and Asian Games, including of the team gold and individual silver and bronze contingent to the 2005 SEA Games. In 2001 she became the founding member of the Equestrian Association of the Philippines, and served as secretary general and president of the EAP in various years. Along with Joker Arroyo, Toni Leviste, and other members of the equestrian community, Coscolluela in 2018 founded Equestrian Philippines, Inc.
