= Honey Lacuna =

Filipina doctor and mayor of Manila from 2022 to 2025

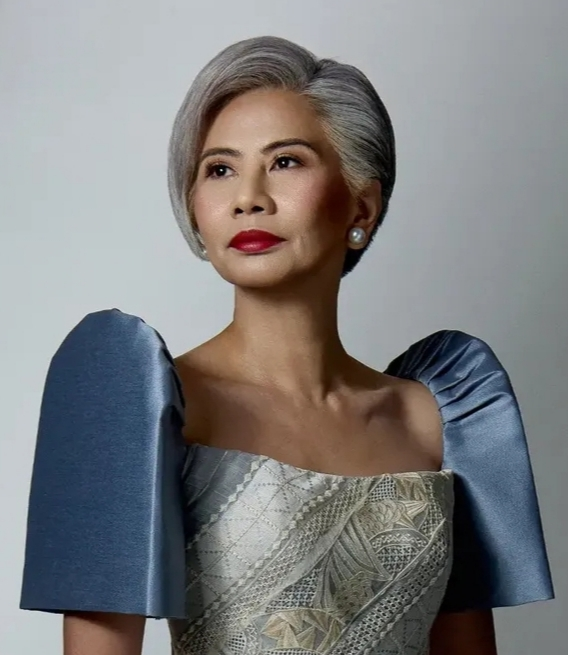
- Lacuna in 2024

28th Mayor of Manila
- In office June 30, 2022 – June 30, 2025
- Vice Mayor: Yul Servo
- Preceded by: Isko Moreno
- Succeeded by: Isko Moreno

34th Vice Mayor of Manila
- In office June 30, 2016 – June 30, 2022
- Mayor: Joseph Estrada (2016–2019); Isko Moreno (2019–2022)
- Preceded by: Isko Moreno
- Succeeded by: Yul Servo

City Social Welfare Officer of the Manila Department of Social Welfare
- Officer-In-Charge
- In office June 30, 2013 – October 14, 2015
- Mayor: Joseph Estrada
- Preceded by: Jay Reyes Dela Fuente
- Succeeded by: Arnold Martin Pangan (OIC)

Member of the Manila City Council from the 4th District
- In office June 30, 2004 – June 30, 2013

President of Asenso Manileño
- Incumbent
- Assumed office August 6, 2024
- Preceded by: Isko Moreno

Deputy Leader of Asenso Manileño
- In office 2005 – August 6, 2024
- Party Leader: Isko Moreno
- Preceded by: Isko Moreno
- Succeeded by: Yul Servo

Vice President for Internal Affairs and National Executive Board Member of Aksyon Demokratiko
- In office August 12, 2021 – August 6, 2024
- Party President: Isko Moreno

Personal details
- Born: Maria Sheilah Honrado Lacuna; May 6, 1965 (age 61) Santa Mesa, Manila, Philippines
- Party: Lakas (2024–present); Asenso Manileño (local party; 2005–present)
- Other political affiliations: Aksyon (2021–2024); NUP (2018–2021); PMP (2012–2018); Nacionalista (2007–2012); PDP–Laban (2007); KNP (2004)
- Spouse: Arnold Martin Pangan
- Children: 1
- Parent: Danilo Lacuna (father)
- Education: University of Santo Tomas (BS); De La Salle Medical and Health Sciences Institute (MD)
- Occupation: Politician; physician
- Profession: Dermatologist; general practitioner
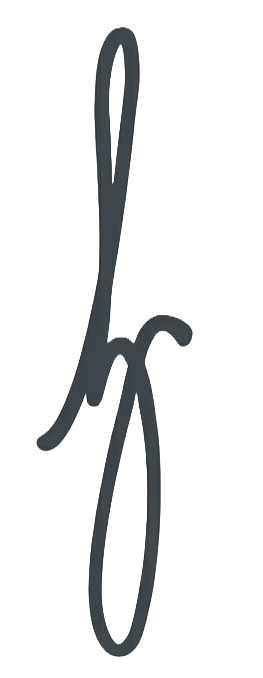
- Signature
- Website: Mayor of Manila website
- Nickname: Mayora

Maria Sheilah "Honey" Honrado Lacuna-Pangan (born May 6, 1965) is a Filipina physician and politician who served as the 28th mayor of Manila, the capital city of the Philippines, from 2022 to 2025. The first woman to become the city's mayor, Lacuna previously served as the city's 33rd and second female vice mayor from 2016 to 2022, as officer-in-charge of the Manila Department of Social Welfare from 2013 to 2015, and as a member of the Manila City Council from 2004 to 2013. She is a daughter of the former vice mayor Danilo Lacuna.

== Early life ==
Lacuna was born on May 6, 1965, in Manila in Manila to Danilo Lacuna, a lawyer who became a city councilor and vice mayor of Manila, and Melanie Honrado, a former Philippine National Bank (PNB) executive. She earned a biology degree at the University of Santo Tomas, earned a Doctor of Medicine degree from De La Salle Medical and Health Sciences Institute, passed the physician board examination in 1992, and completed her residency training in dermatology at the Ospital ng Maynila Medical Center. She eventually became a fellow of the Philippine Dermatological Society.

== Medical career ==
A general practitioner with specialization in dermatology by profession, Lacuna worked as a resident physician of the dermatology department of Ospital ng Maynila Medical Center from 1992 to 1995 and as the public health center physician under the Manila Health Department from 1995 to 2004. As the latter, she was assigned to the Bacood Health Center in Santa Mesa and later to the Tondo Health Center in Tondo. Her father, then Vice Mayor Danny Lacuna, then tasked her to head the medical team of his office's regular medical and dental mission conducted every week in various depressed communities in Manila.

She served as the Acting City Social Welfare Officer of Manila from 2013 to 2015.

== Political career ==
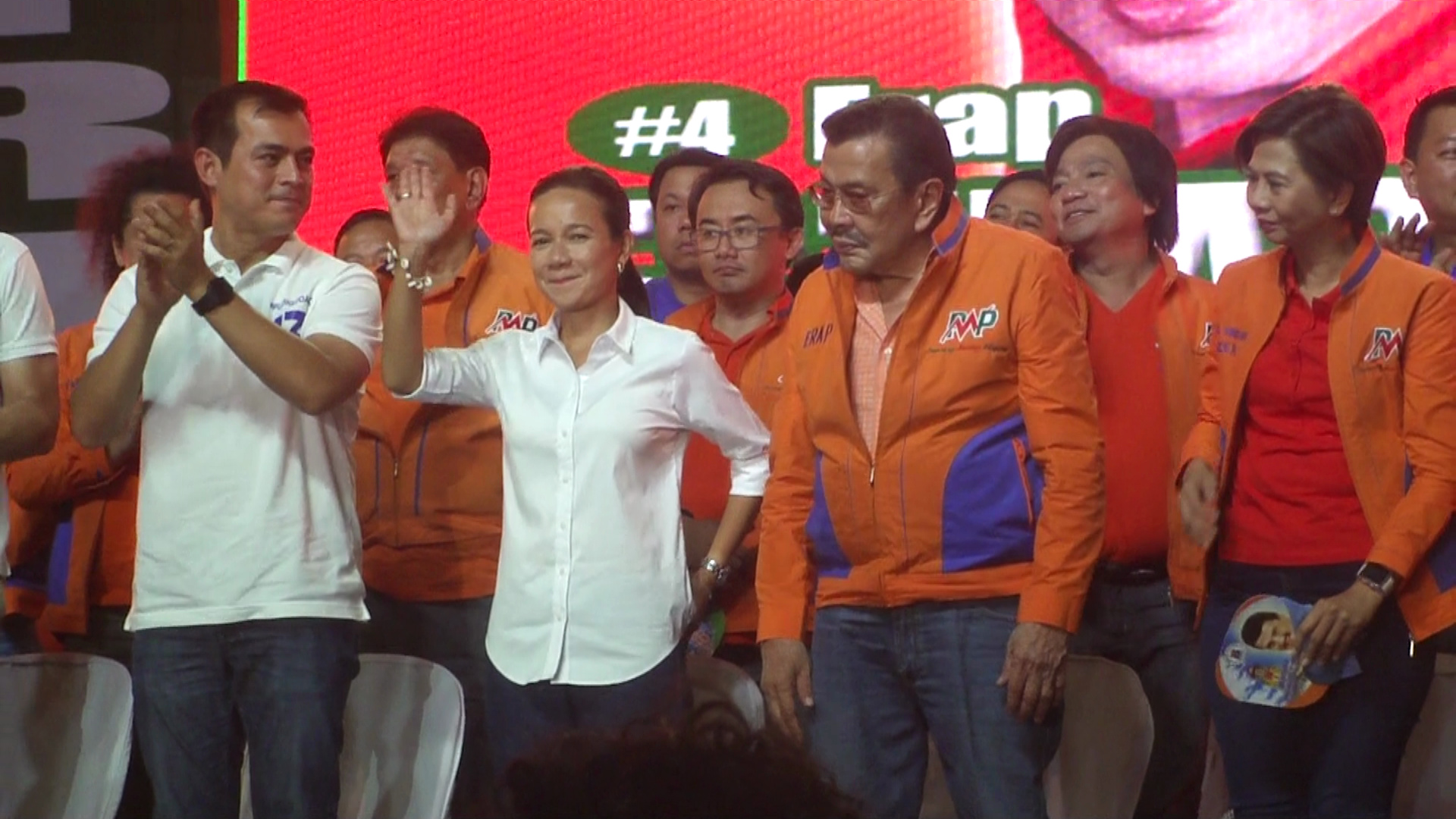
Joseph Estrada's (second from right) election campaign rally in Tondo, Manila in 2016 along with Isko Moreno (left), Grace Poe (second from left), and Honey Lacuna (right)

=== Councilor (2004–2013) ===
Lacuna then entered politics when she substituted a candidate for councilor in the 4th district of Manila who withdrew from the race ahead of the 2004 city elections. She ran under the ticket of her father, who was the running mate of former Mayor Mel Lopez of Koalisyon ng Nagkakaisang Pilipino. She then won, serving as a Manila city councilor from the 4th district for three consecutive terms from 2004 to 2013. As councilor, she served in the minority whip from 2004 to 2007, was chairperson of the Committee on Education, a member of 38 committees, and majority floor leader, the first woman to be named so. She also authored, among others, the following:

- Ordinance No. 8095 designating bicycle and motorcycle Lanes in the main thoroughfares in Manila;
- Ordinance No. 8179 creating the Manila AIDS Council for the prevention and control of sexually transmitted infections;
- Ordinance No. 8117 mandating all business establishments, private and public offices in the City of Manila, including schools to require all their applicants and employees to submit to drug testing and to conduct unannounced drug tests on all their employees at least once a year; and
- Ordinance No. 8102 requires the city's hymn ("Awit ng Maynila") in all flag ceremonies of schools, offices and other institutional/official programs, in the opening of any official gatherings in Manila, before the start of the regular sessions of the Manila City Council, programs or functions of the City Government of Manila and of the barangays, programs or activities initiated, sponsored or coordinated by or with the City Government of Manila, programs, celebrations, or activities initiated or coordinated by accredited and City-registered non-government organizations and civic oriented groups; city and tourism activities of the City Government of Manila in any place as well as in official City gatherings or meetings outside the city; special activities such as those observed during the Cityhood Celebration, Bataan Day, Independence Day, National Heroes Day, Bonifacio Day and Rizal Day.

=== Vice Mayor (2016–2022) ===
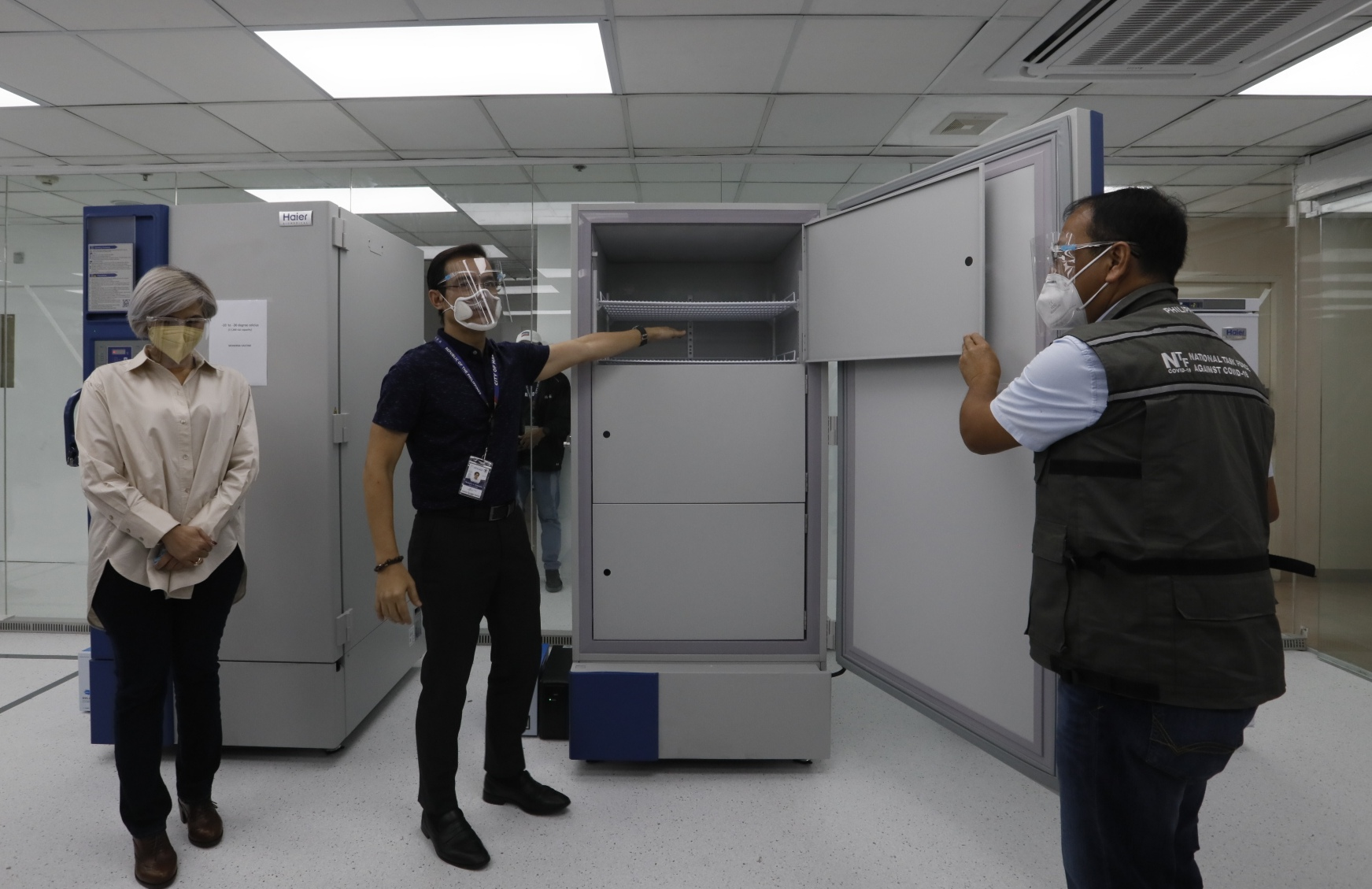
Vice Mayor Honey Lacuna (left), together with vaccine czar Carlito Galvez Jr. (right) and Mayor Isko Moreno (center), during the opening of Santa Ana Hospital's cold storage for COVID-19 vaccines in 2021

In the 2016 city election, she was chosen as the running mate of incumbent mayor Joseph Estrada, who was seeking re-election under Pwersa ng Masang Pilipino (PMP); she then won the vice mayoralty race. She became the first woman to be elected vice mayor since the post became an elective position. She was then reelected in 2019, this time as the running mate of her predecessor Isko Moreno, who was running for mayor under Asenso Manileño and defeated Estrada. During the COVID-19 pandemic, she stood as a point person for Moreno in coordinating with the hospital directors of Manila, applying her expertise as a medical doctor. In 2021, she joined Aksyon Demokratiko and was named as the party's vice-president for Internal Affairs and National Executive Board Member.

=== Mayor (2022–2025) ===
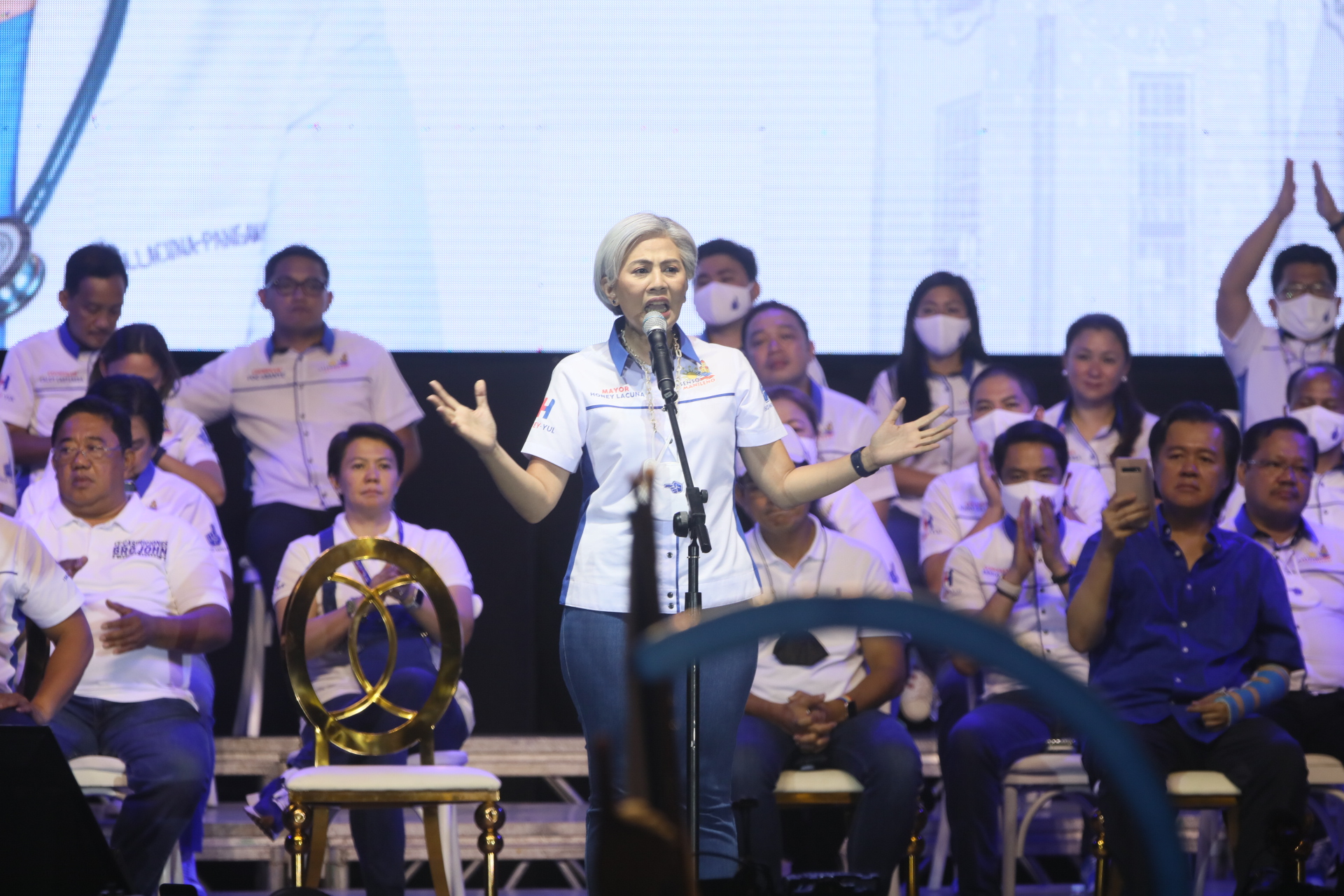
Lacuna during the grand proclamation rally of Asenso Manileño for the 2022 local elections

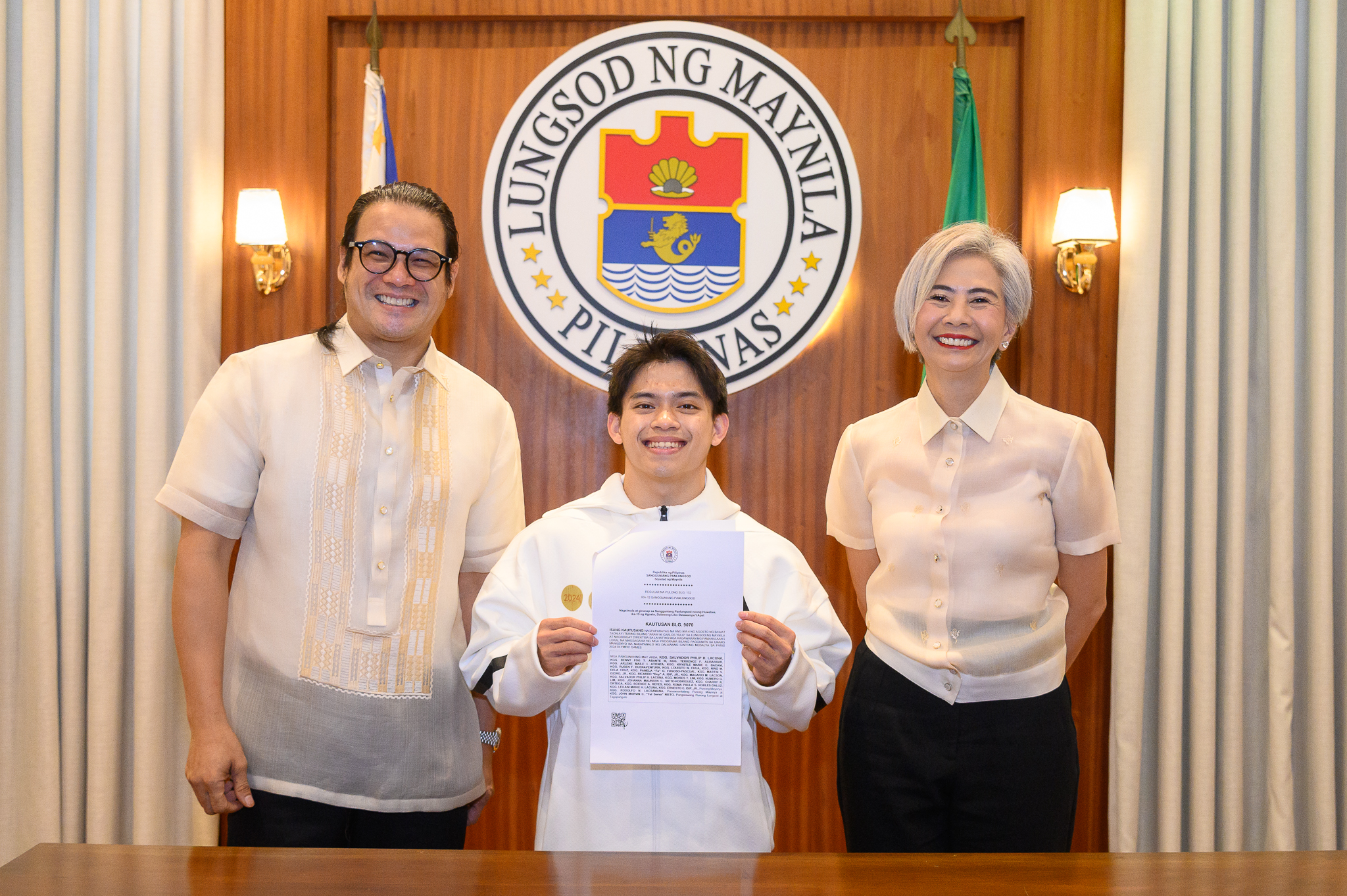
Lacuna (right) and Yul Servo (left) posing with Carlos Yulo (center) in 2024

With Isko Moreno running for president in 2022, Lacuna was nominated by Asenso Manileño to run for mayor in 2022 to succeed him, with Manila's 3rd district representative Yul Servo as her running mate and vice mayoral candidate. She won the race by a huge margin over her closest rival, Alex Lopez, making her the first-ever female to become mayor of Manila. She was inaugurated before outgoing mayor Moreno on June 29, 2022, at the Manila Cathedral, but only officially started her term on the next day, succeeding him. As mayor, she vowed to prioritize health care and expand Moreno's programs.

On August 5, 2022, Lacuna was conferred with a degree of Doctor of Public Administration, honoris causa by the Pamantasan ng Lungsod ng Maynila.

As mayor, Lacuna initiated the "Kalinga sa Maynila," which brings essential city hall services directly to residents. She also reported that since assuming office as mayor, she has visited 500 out of Manila's 897 barangays and paid off ₱2.5 billion of the ₱17.8 billion debt left by her predecessor, Isko Moreno, for infrastructure projects as of August 2024. Additionally, three six-story school buildings were constructed under her administration. The Manila city government, under her administration, was also awarded its first Seal of Good Local Governance (SGLG) in 2024, highlighting focus on transparency, accountability, and inclusivity in governance. Her tenure has also faced criticisms on ₱625 health permit requirement for Manila workers by virtue of an ordinance signed by Moreno in 2022, the conditions at the Manila Public Health Laboratory in Santa Cruz, delays in infrastructure projects, and the city's garbage crisis in 2025.

On August 6, 2024, Lacuna joined the Lakas–CMD party. On August 27, she announced her re-election bid for mayor in 2025. However, she lost her re-election bid to Moreno, who won by a landslide, with her finishing far second.

== Personal life ==
Lacuna is married to Arnold "Poks" Martin Pangan, a fellow physician and registered social worker who was the City Health Officer of Manila, City Social Welfare Department Head of Manila, and a 2013 candidate for Manila councilor from the fourth district. They have one daughter.

Lacuna's siblings Leilani Marie Lacuna, Salvador Philip Lacuna, and Danilo Victor "Dennis" Lacuna Jr. are former members of the Manila City Council from the sixth district, with Leilani also had served as the Liga ng mga Barangay president for Manila and a sectoral representative on the city council.

== Electoral history ==
Electoral history of Honey Lacuna
Year	Office	Party	Votes received				Result
Year	Office	Party	Total	%	P.	Swing	Result
2004	Councilor (4th district)	KNP	50,290		5th		Won
2007	Councilor (4th district)	PDP–Laban	45,279		3rd		Won
2010	Councilor (4th district)	Nacionalista	57,859	10.83%	2nd		Won
2016	Vice Mayor	Asenso	268,969	37.91%	1st	—N/a	Won
2019	Vice Mayor	Asenso	394,766	57.28%	1st	+19.37	Won
2022	Mayor	Asenso	538,595	63.68%	1st	—N/a	Won
2025	Mayor	Asenso	190,617	21.19%	2nd	-42.49	Lost

Government offices
Preceded by Jay Reyes Dela Fuente (City Gov't Dept. Head III)	City Social Welfare Officer of the Manila Department of Social Welfare (Officer-in-charge); 2013–2015	Succeeded by Arnold Martin Pangan (Officer-in-charge)
Political offices
Preceded by Isko Moreno	Vice Mayor of Manila; 2016–2022	Succeeded by Yul Servo
Preceded by Isko Moreno	Mayor of Manila; 2022–2025	Succeeded by Isko Moreno
Party political offices
Preceded by Isko Moreno	Deputy Leader of Asenso Manileño; 2005–2024	Succeeded by Yul Servo
Preceded by Isko Moreno	Asenso Manileño nominee for Vice Mayor of Manila; 2016, 2019	Succeeded by Yul Servo
Preceded by Isko Moreno	Asenso Manileño nominee for Mayor of Manila; 2022, 2025	Most recent
Preceded by Isko Moreno	President of Asenso Manileño; 2024–present	Incumbent
