= Buhay Party-List =

Political party in the Philippines

Buhay
- — Philippine partylist —
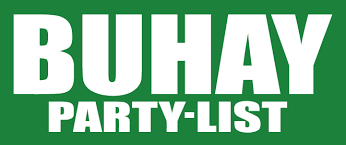
- Full name: Buhay Hayaan Yumabong
- Founder: Lito Atienza; Mike Velarde
- Founded: October 20, 1999; 27 years ago
- Ideology: Social conservatism
- Political position: Right-wing
- Colors: Green

Buhay Hayaan Yumabong (transl. Let Life Prosper), more popularly known as Buhay Party-List, is a party-list group in the Philippines founded on October 20, 1999, by Lito Atienza, Melquiades Robles, and El Shaddai founder Mike Velarde. A socially conservative party-list, Buhay is known for its staunch opposition to abortion and birth control in its advocacy for the sanctity of life. The party-list is also known for opposing the death penalty, divorce, same sex marriage, and euthanasia.

In the 2004 elections for the House of Representatives, the party-list group won 705,730 votes (5.55% of the nationwide party-list vote), equivalent to two seats. In 2007, the party won three seats in the nationwide party-list vote. In the 2010 elections, Buhay again won three seats, and ranked third overall.

In 2022, Buhay Party List lost their re-election bid after garnering only 103,077 votes, failing to win a single seat for the first time since their founding. After also failing to win a seat in the 2025 elections, Buhay was delisted for being unable to win a seat for two consecutive elections.

== Electoral performance ==
Election	Votes	%	Seats	Member
2001	290,760	1.92%	2	Christian Señeres; Rene Velarde
2004	705,730	5.55%	2	Christian Señeres; Rene Velarde
2007	1,169,234	7.33%	3	Ma. Carissa Coscolluela; Irwin Tieng; Rene Velarde
2010	1,249,555	4.19%	2	Mike Velarde, Jr. Irwin Tieng
2013	1,255,808	4.62%	3	Mike Velarde, Jr. Lito Atienza; Irwin Tieng
2016	760,912	2.35%	2	Mike Velarde, Jr. Lito Atienza
2019	361,493	1.30%	1	Lito Atienza
2022	103,077	0.28%	0	N/A (19th Congress)
2025	99,365	0.24%	0	N/A (20th Congress)
