= San Andres, Manila =

District of Manila, Metro Manila, Philippines

Coordinates: 14°34′26″N 121°0′14″E

San Andres San Andres Bukid
- District of Manila
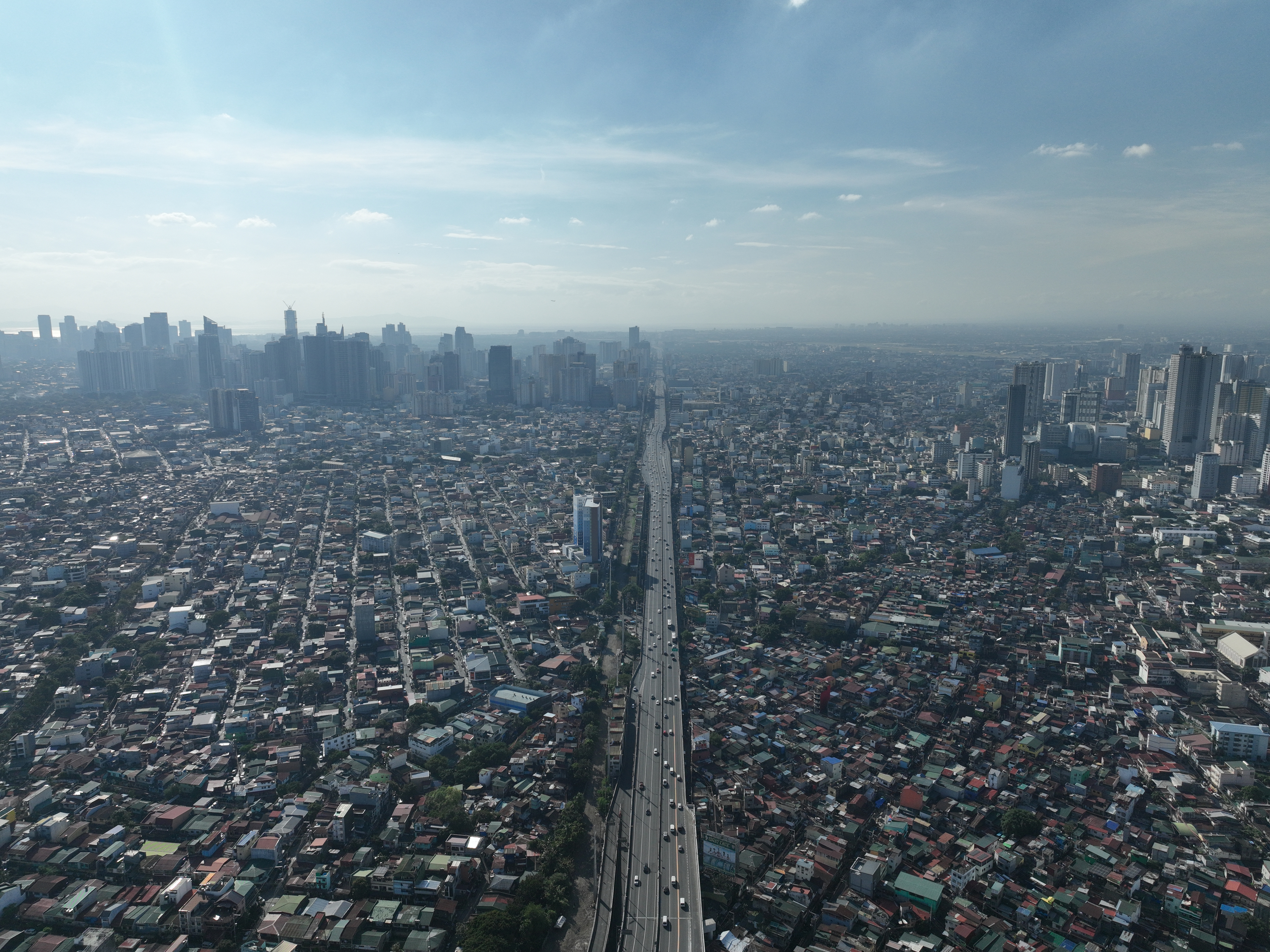
- Drone view with San Andres Bukid on the foreground

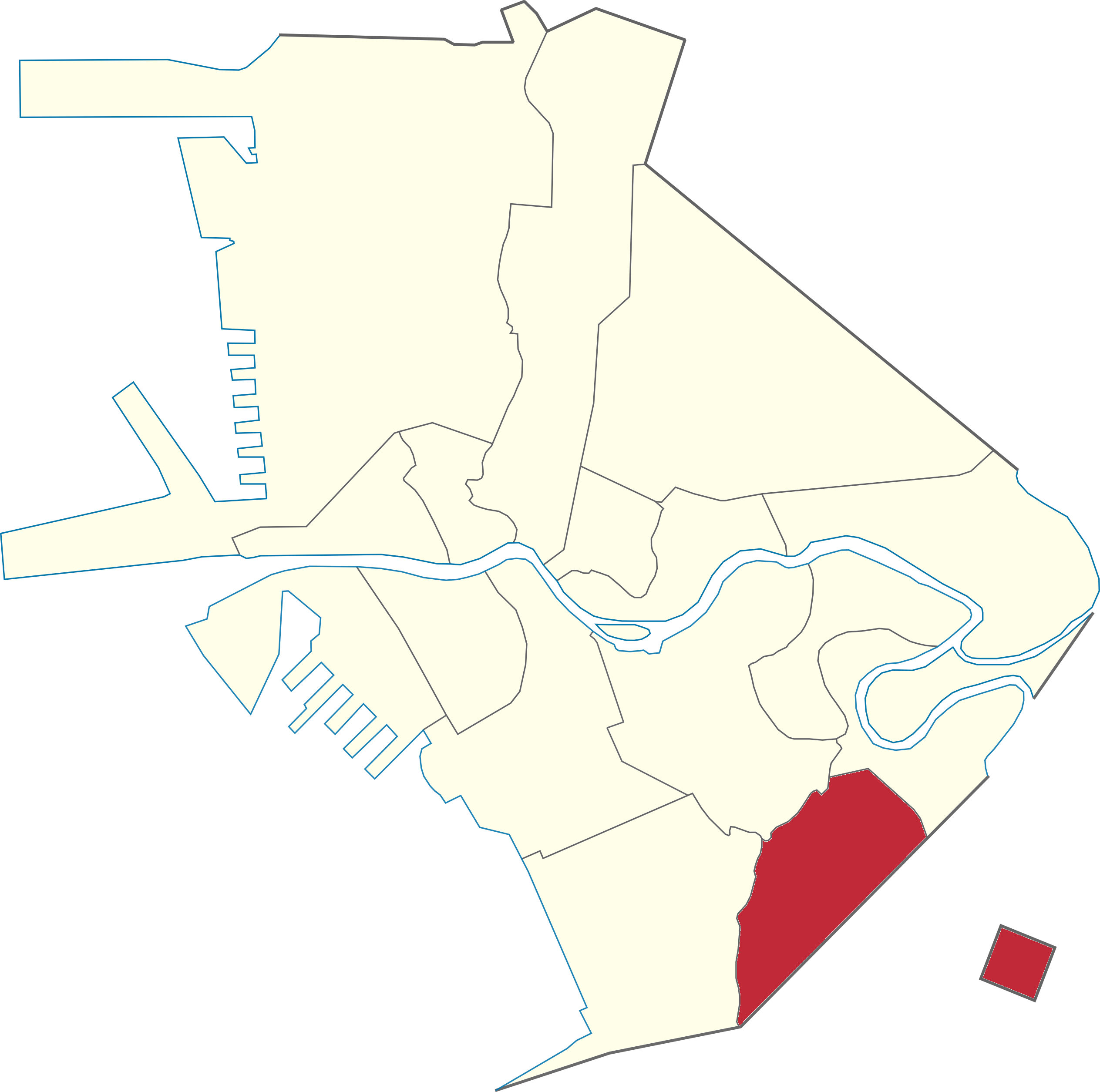
- Country: Philippines
- Region: National Capital Region
- City: Manila
- Congressional districts: Part of the 5th district of Manila
- Barangays: 65
- Named for: St. Andrew the Apostle

Area
  - Total: 1.6802 km^{2} (0.6487 sq mi)

Population (2020)
  - Total: 133,727
  - Density: 79,590/km^{2} (206,140/sq mi)

San Andres (also San Andres Bukid) is a district of Manila, Philippines. San Andres shares the Estero Tripa de Gallina as its western and northern border with the districts of Malate and Paco, respectively and Pedro Gil and Tejeron streets to the east with the district of Santa Ana. It borders the city of Makati in the south. The area is under the jurisdiction of the 5th congressional district of Manila, and includes the Manila South Cemetery, an exclave surrounded by land belonging to Barangay Santa Cruz, Makati.

== Etymology ==
San Andres is also known by its longer name, San Andres Bukid. The first part of the name comes from Spanish for Saint Andrew the Apostle, the patron saint of Manila; while the second part comes from Tagalog bukid, meaning "farm" or "[rice] field", denoting the area’s former state.

== Profile ==
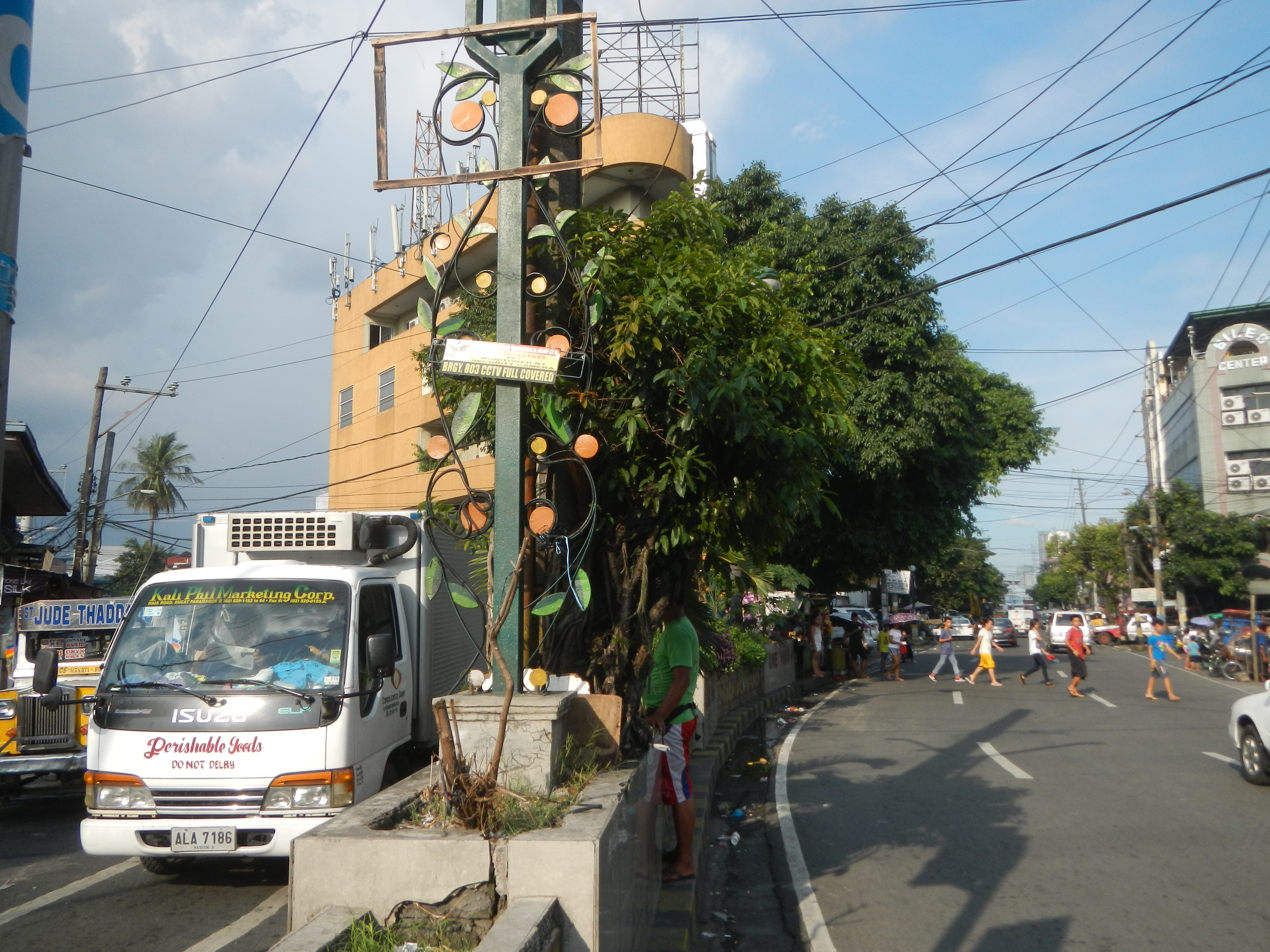
Diamante and San Andres Streets

Although San Andres has only a small land area, it is the second most densely populated district in Manila, as of 2020, after Santa Ana. San Andres is divided into its eastern and western sectors by the Osmeña Highway. Mostly residential, San Andres also has some sections classified as commercial.

The majority of the district's population live just above the poverty line, mostly composed of post-World War II settlers from various provinces while the original inhabitants were middle or lower-class migrant families who had formerly settled in Tondo but found the rough working-class lifestyle less suitable for raising children. The influx of settlers into the district was unregulated, resulting in a lack of urban planning as evidenced by irregular buildings, narrow roadways, and large blocks of houses accessible only through meter-wide alleyways.

== History ==
What is now San Andres Bukid was carved from the pre-World War II district of Singalong, as well as parts of the Hacienda de San Pedro Macati (as of 1851 purchase by the Zobel de Ayala family), Santa Ana, Malate, and Paco. Singalong district is largely absorbed into San Andres and is commemorated by a namesake street that runs perpendicular to Quirino Avenue and parallel to Taft Avenue. The street lies west of what is now the western section of San Andres. Elderly residents of Singalong believe that the area's name was derived from a Tagalog word for a cup fashioned from bamboo.

In the Spanish colonial era, Spaniards awarded the area to members of the Capuchin missionaries who thereafter converted the native population to Christianity. In the aftermath of the Second World War, the southern section of Manila was devastated as with most of the city. San Andres was then mostly open space, and it was repopulated by migrants from nearby provinces and the Visayas.

== Barangays ==
San Andres has 65 barangays.

Zones	Barangays
81	745, 746, 747, 748, 749, 750, 751, 752, 753, and 754
82	755, 756, 757, 758, 759, 760, 761, and 762
83	763, 764, 765, 766, 767, 768, and 769
84	770, 771, 772, 773, 774, and 775
85	776, 777, 778, 779, 780, 781, 782, and 783
86	784, 785, 786, 787, 788, 789, 790, 791, 792, and 793
87	794, 795, 796, 797, 798, 799, 800, 801, 802, 803, 804, 805, 806, and 807
88	808 and 818-A

Barangay	Land area (km^{2})	Population (2020 census)
Zone 81
Barangay 745	0.01368 km^{2}	2,015
Barangay 746	0.03431 km^{2}	1,663
Barangay 747	0.01162 km^{2}	369
Barangay 748	0.02862 km^{2}	812
Barangay 749	0.01158 km^{2}	616
Barangay 750	0.02622 km^{2}	1,107
Barangay 751	0.02500 km^{2}	1,541
Barangay 752	0.01707 km^{2}	763
Barangay 753	0.02440 km^{2}	2,380
Barangay 754	0.01321 km^{2}	2,584
Zone 82
Barangay 755	0.03368 km^{2}	1,372
Barangay 756	0.02718 km^{2}	721
Barangay 757	0.01371 km^{2}	477
Barangay 758	0.01919 km^{2}	399
Barangay 759	0.02807 km^{2}	787
Barangay 760	0.02862 km^{2}	1,041
Barangay 761	0.02923 km^{2}	1,062
Barangay 762	0.02659 km^{2}	365
Zone 83
Barangay 763	0.02910 km^{2}	1,779
Barangay 764	0.04799 km^{2}	2,022
Barangay 765	0.02925 km^{2}	2,075
Barangay 766	0.02168 km^{2}	3,101
Barangay 767	0.04205 km^{2}	5,429
Barangay 768	0.02618 km^{2}	1,147
Barangay 769	0.03396 km^{2}	1,997
Zone 84
Barangay 770	0.05491 km^{2}	9,651
Barangay 771	0.02879 km^{2}	1,813
Barangay 772	0.03136 km^{2}	2,426
Barangay 773	0.02712 km^{2}	2,748
Barangay 774	0.01882 km^{2}	2,878
Barangay 775	0.04849 km^{2}	12,084
Zone 85
Barangay 776	0.03147 km^{2}	4,592
Barangay 777	0.02803 km^{2}	3,011
Barangay 778	0.01567 km^{2}	1,848
Barangay 779	0.03686 km^{2}	4,444
Barangay 780	0.03174 km^{2}	2,316
Barangay 781	0.03282 km^{2}	4,275
Barangay 782	0.02517 km^{2}	1,483
Barangay 783	0.02714 km^{2}	2,145
Zone 86
Barangay 784	0.02519 km^{2}	3,386
Barangay 785	0.01440 km^{2}	932
Barangay 786	0.02850 km^{2}	1,439
Barangay 787	0.02013 km^{2}	3,622
Barangay 788	0.01417 km^{2}	969
Barangay 789	0.01974 km^{2}	1,620
Barangay 790	0.05244 km^{2}	1,741
Barangay 791	0.02746 km^{2}	2,029
Barangay 792	0.03035 km^{2}	2,559
Barangay 793	0.02300 km^{2}	1,722
Zone 87
Barangay 794	0.01193 km^{2}	710
Barangay 795	0.006150 km^{2}	1,157
Barangay 796	0.01082 km^{2}	631
Barangay 797	0.008080 km^{2}	244
Barangay 798	0.02783 km^{2}	1,562
Barangay 799	0.01618 km^{2}	544
Barangay 800	0.01878 km^{2}	1,558
Barangay 801	0.02077 km^{2}	614
Barangay 802	0.02825 km^{2}	1,787
Barangay 803	0.04550 km^{2}	1,705
Barangay 804	0.02363 km^{2}	1,251
Barangay 805	0.01954 km^{2}	1,237
Barangay 806	0.02879 km^{2}	1,603
Barangay 807	0.03136 km^{2}	2,010
Zone 88
Barangay 808	0.02769 km^{2}	2,183
Barangay 818-A	0.008350 km^{2}	1,564
