= Asenso Manileño =

Local political party in Manila, Philippines

Asenso Manileño Movement
- Leader: Honey Lacuna Pangan
- Deputy Leader: Yul Servo Nieto
- President: Honey Lacuna Pangan
- Secretary–General: Joel Chua
- Founders: Danny Lacuna; Isko Moreno
- Founded: 2005
- Headquarters: 302-B ECJ Building, Arzobispo Street, Intramuros, Manila
- Ideology: Manila regionalism Localism
- National affiliation: Lakas (since 2024) Former: Nacionalista (2005–07; 2010–13); PDP–Laban (2007–10); UNA (2013–15); PMP (2015–18); NUP (2018–21); Aksyon (2021–24)
- Colours: Dark blue, white, red
- Slogan: "Kalinga sa Maynila" (lit. transl. Compassion in Manila)
- House of Representatives (Manila seats): 5 / 6
- Manila City Council: 12 / 38

Asenso Manileño Movement (lit. 'Progress for Manilans') is a local political party in Manila. It is formerly the city's ruling party from 2019 to 2025, being in dominion through the administrations of mayors Isko Moreno and Honey Lacuna.

== History ==
The party was established in 2005 by Moreno's mentor, Danny Lacuna, the vice mayor of Manila at that time. The party's signature hand gesture is pointing the index finger upward which means "God first", the party's slogan. The party managed Moreno's successful vice mayoral campaign in the 2013 election, despite carrying then Mayor Joseph Estrada's United Nationalist Alliance ticket. In 2018, Moreno decided to challenge Estrada for the mayoralty in the 2019 elections. Moreno won the election and his allies then controlled a majority of seats in the Manila City Council.

The National Unity Party then took on the party as its local affiliate in August 2019, with Moreno being named as one of its vice chairmen. In 2021, the party changed its national affiliation to the progressive Aksyon Demokratiko with Moreno being named its national president.

In the 2022 elections, the party attained a historic success. Its bets Honey Lacuna and Yul Servo won as mayor and vice mayor, respectively, retaining control, while 34 of the 36 elective seats in the city council were won as well. Additionally, all six congressional elections were won by candidates allied with the party.

In 2024, incumbent Mayor Honey Lacuna succeeded Isko Moreno as party leader of Asenso Manileño after he left the party to pursue a comeback run for mayor in 2025, which was later confirmed. Lacuna later joined the Lakas–CMD and formalized her re-election bid for mayor in 2025, eventually running against Moreno and 9 others. However, Lacuna and Servo lost their re-election bids to Moreno and Chi Atienza, respectively, with the party winning 12 or one-third of the elected seats of the Manila City Council and 5 (initially 4 prior to the disqualification of Aksyon's Joey Uy) out of the 6 congressional seats in Manila.

== Electoral performance ==
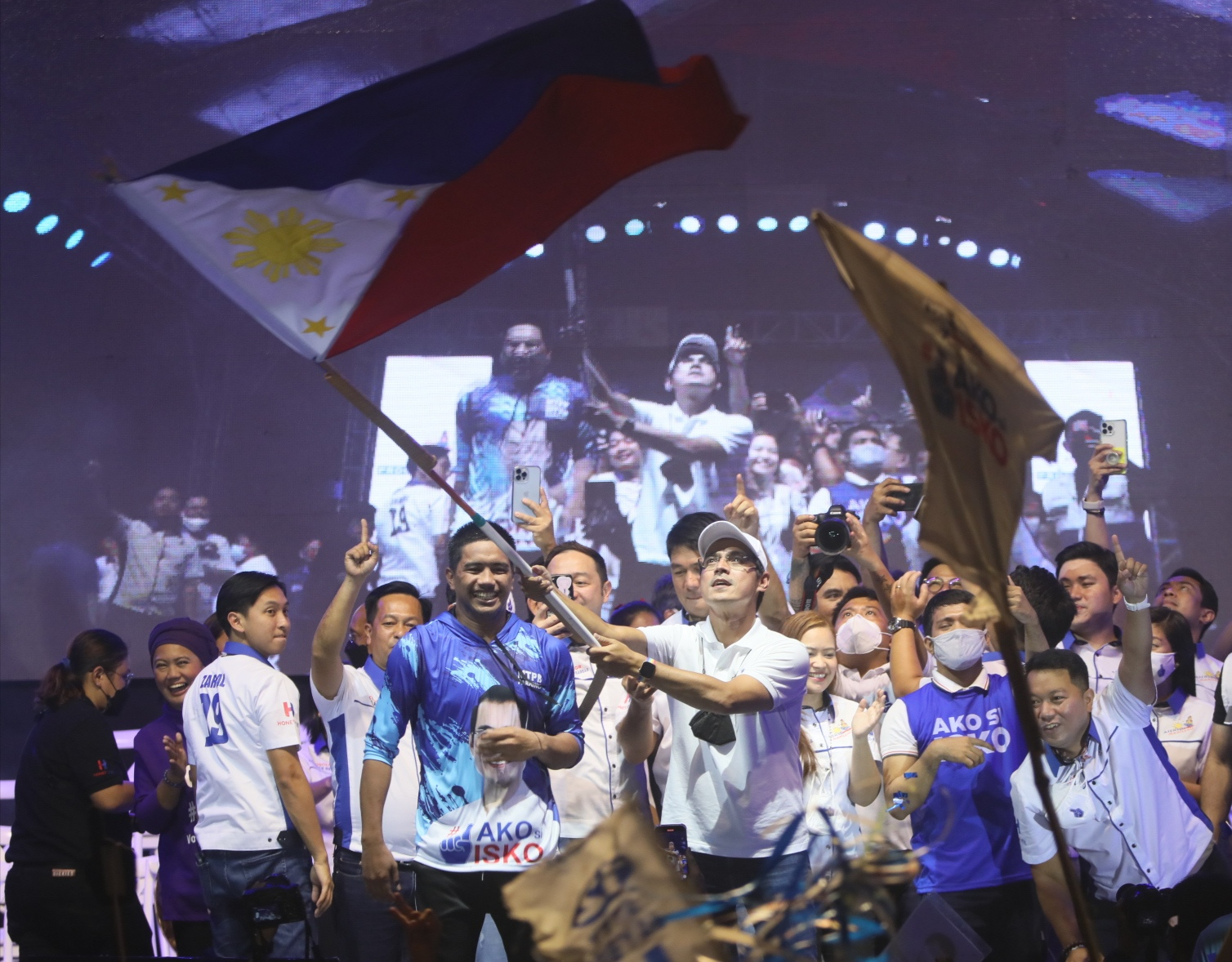
Asenso Manileño (Honey-Yul slate) grand proclamation rally for the 2022 Manila local elections, led by Isko Moreno

=== Mayoral and Vice Mayoral elections ===
Year	Mayoral election				Vice mayoral election			
Year	Candidate	Votes	%	Result	Candidate	Votes	%	Result
2007	Danny Lacuna	143,517	27.9%	Lost	Isko Moreno	176,215	34.29%	Won
2010	None (Note: Moreno's running mate was Alfredo Lim (Liberal). But other members supported Avelino Razon (NPC).)			—N/a	Isko Moreno (Note: Moreno's party in the ballot was Nacionalista.)	498,609	79.86%	Won
2013	None (Note: Moreno's running mate was Joseph Estrada (UNA).)			—N/a	Isko Moreno (Note: Moreno's party in the ballot is UNA.)	395,156	62.78%	Won
2016	None (Note: Lacuna's running mate was incumbent Joseph Estrada (PMP).)			—N/a	Honey Lacuna	268,969	37.91%	Won
2019	Isko Moreno	357,925	50.15%	Won	Honey Lacuna	394,766	57.28%	Won
2022	Honey Lacuna	538,595	63.63%	Won	Yul Servo	586,766	73.67%	Won
2025	Honey Lacuna	190,617	21.19%	Lost	Yul Servo	249,691	28.49%	Lost

=== City Council elections ===
Year	Seats			Popular vote			Result
Year	Seats won	%	Change	Votes	%	Swing	Result
2013	0 / 36	0.00%	—N/a	1,467	0.05%	—N/a	Lost
2016	24 / 36	66.67%	▲24	1,611,970	41.11%	▲41.06 pp	Majority
2019	16 / 36	44.44%	8	1,281,855	35.36%	▼5.75 pp	Majority
2022	34 / 36	94.44%	▲18	2,950,976	68.56%	▲33.2 pp	Majority
2025	12 / 36	33.33%	▼22	1,547,285	34.57%	▼33.99 pp	Minority

=== House of Representatives elections ===
Election	Seats allocated for Manila	Outcome of election
2013	0 / 6	Did not participate
2016	2 / 6	Joined the majority
2019	3 / 6	Split between the majority and minority blocs
2022	6 / 6	Joined the majority
2025	5 / 6	Joined the majority

== List of leaders ==
Name	Term start	Term end	Deputy
Danny Lacuna	2005		Isko Moreno
Isko Moreno	2005	2024	Honey Lacuna
Honey Lacuna Pangan	2024	present	Yul Servo

== Slogan ==
- God first (until August 2024)
- Kalinga sa Maynila (from August 2024)
