= 2022 Philippine local elections in Metro Manila =

- May 9, 2022
- Mayoral elections
- 16 city mayors and 1 municipal mayor
| Party | Seats | +/– |
|---|---|---|
| PDP–Laban | 5 | −1 |
| Nacionalista | 3 | +1 |
| Aksyon | 2 | +1 |
| 1Munti | 1 | New |
| Asenso | 1 | 0 |
| Lakas | 1 | +1 |
| MKTZNU | 1 | New |
| Navoteño | 1 | 0 |
| NPC | 1 | −1 |
| SBP | 1 | 0 |
| UNA | 1 | 0 |
This lists parties that won seats. See the complete results below.
- Vice mayoral elections
- 16 city vice mayors and 1 municipal vice mayor
| Party | Seats | +/– |
|---|---|---|
| Nacionalista | 4 | +3 |
| PDP–Laban | 2 | −3 |
| 1Munti | 1 | New |
| Aksyon | 1 | +1 |
| Asenso | 1 | 0 |
| LDP | 1 | New |
| Liberal | 1 | New |
| MKTZNU | 1 | New |
| Navoteño | 1 | 0 |
| NPC | 1 | −4 |
| NUP | 1 | 0 |
| SBP | 1 | 0 |
| UNA | 1 | 0 |
This lists parties that won seats. See the complete results below.
- City Council elections
- 266 city councilors and 12 municipal councilors
| Party | Seats | +/– |
|---|---|---|
| Nacionalista | 46 | +21 |
| PDP–Laban | 45 | −23 |
| Asenso | 34 | +18 |
| SBP | 25 | −8 |
| NPC | 22 | −5 |
| 1Munti | 16 | New |
| Aksyon | 16 | +14 |
| MKTZNU | 15 | New |
| UNA | 15 | +2 |
| Navoteño | 12 | 0 |
| Lakas | 9 | +9 |
| Liberal | 4 | −10 |
| NUP | 3 | −7 |
| PFP | 2 | 0 |
| PPP | 2 | New |
| FRPAMM | 1 | New |
| LDP | 1 | New |
| PDDS | 1 | +1 |
| Reform | 1 | New |
| Independent | 8 | −3 |
This lists parties that won seats. See the complete results below.

The 2022 Philippine local elections in Metro Manila were held on May 9, 2022.

== Summary ==
=== Mayors ===
| City/municipality | Incumbent | Incumbent's party | Winner | Winner's party | Winning margin |
|---|---|---|---|---|---|
| Caloocan | Oscar Malapitan | Nacionalista | Along Malapitan | PDP–Laban | 12.98% |
| Las Piñas | Imelda Aguilar | Nacionalista | Imelda Aguilar | Nacionalista | 31.02% |
| Makati | Abigail Binay | MKTZNU | Abigail Binay | MKTZNU | 90.64% |
| Malabon | Antolin Oreta III | Liberal | Jeannie Sandoval | Nacionalista | 0.68% |
| Mandaluyong | Carmelita Abalos | PDP–Laban | Benjamin Abalos | PDP–Laban | 69.68% |
| Manila | Isko Moreno | Aksyon | Honey Lacuna | Asenso Manileño | 43.94% |
| Marikina | Marcelino Teodoro | UNA | Marcelino Teodoro | UNA | 64.16% |
| Muntinlupa | Jaime Fresnedi | Liberal | Ruffy Biazon | One Muntinlupa | 49.43% |
| Navotas | Toby Tiangco | Navoteño | John Rey Tiangco | Navoteño | 28.48% |
| Parañaque | Edwin Olivarez | PDP–Laban | Eric Olivarez | PDP–Laban | 40.66% |
| Pasay | Emi Rubiano | PDP–Laban | Emi Rubiano | PDP–Laban | 56.16% |
| Pasig | Vico Sotto | Aksyon | Vico Sotto | Aksyon | 76.08% |
| Pateros (municipality) | Ike Ponce | Aksyon | Ike Ponce | Aksyon | 82.26% |
| Quezon City | Joy Belmonte | SBP | Joy Belmonte | SBP | 22.21% |
| San Juan | Francis Zamora | PDP–Laban | Francis Zamora | PDP–Laban | 75.32% |
| Taguig | Lino Cayetano | Nacionalista | Lani Cayetano | Nacionalista | 51.54% |
| Valenzuela | Rex Gatchalian | NPC | Wes Gatchalian | NPC | 57.22% |

=== Vice mayors ===
| City/municipality | Incumbent | Incumbent's party | Winner | Winner's party | Winning margin |
|---|---|---|---|---|---|
| Caloocan | Maca Asistio | NPC | Karina Teh | Nacionalista | 26.65% |
| Las Piñas | April Aguilar | Nacionalista | April Aguilar | Nacionalista | 37.08% |
| Makati | Monique Lagdameo | MKTZNU | Monique Lagdameo | MKTZNU | 86.64% |
| Malabon | Ninong dela Cruz | NUP | Ninong dela Cruz | NUP | 10.76% |
| Mandaluyong | Anthony Suva | PDP–Laban | Carmelita Abalos | PDP–Laban | Unopposed |
| Manila | Honey Lacuna | Asenso Manileño | Yul Servo | Asenso Manileño | 50.39% |
| Marikina | Marion Andres | UNA | Marion Andres | UNA | 41.92% |
| Muntinlupa | Artemio Simundac | One Muntinlupa | Artemio Simundac | One Muntinlupa | 14.96% |
| Navotas | Clint Geronimo | Navoteño | Tito Sanchez | Navoteño | 45.61% |
| Parañaque | Rico Golez | LDP | Joan Villafuerte | Liberal | 5.19% |
| Pasay | Boyet del Rosario | PDP–Laban | Ding del Rosario | LDP | 48.84% |
| Pasig | Iyo Caruncho Bernardo | PRP | Robert Jaworski Jr. | Aksyon | 31.85% |
| Pateros (municipality) | Gerald German | PDP–Laban | Carlo Santos | Nacionalista | 8.46% |
| Quezon City | Gian Sotto | SBP | Gian Sotto | SBP | 15.03% |
| San Juan | Warren Villa | PDP–Laban | Warren Villa | PDP–Laban | 54.20% |
| Taguig | Ading Cruz | Nacionalista | Arvin Alit | Nacionalista | 37.62% |
| Valenzuela | Lorie Natividad-Borja | NPC | Lorie Natividad-Borja | NPC | 55.36% |

=== City councils ===
| City/municipality | Seats | Party control | | Composition |
| City/municipality | Seats | Previous | Result | Composition |
|---|---|---|---|---|
| Caloocan | 18 elected 2 ex-officio | No majority | No majority | Nacionalista (10); Aksyon (3); PDP–Laban (2); Lakas (2); NUP (1) |
| Las Piñas | 12 elected 2 ex-officio | NPC | Nacionalista | Nacionalista (8); Aksyon (1); Independent (3) |
| Makati | 16 elected 2 ex-officio | UNA | MKTZNU | MKTZNU (15); Reform (1) |
| Malabon | 12 elected 2 ex-officio | No majority | No majority | Nacionalista (3); NPC (2); Aksyon (2); Liberal (2); NUP (2); UNA (1) |
| Mandaluyong | 12 elected 2 ex-officio | PDP–Laban | PDP–Laban | PDP–Laban (8); Aksyon (1); Nacionalista (1); Independent (2) |
| Manila | 36 elected 2 ex-officio | No majority | Asenso Manileño | Asenso Manileño (34); Independent (2) |
| Marikina | 16 elected 2 ex-officio | No majority | UNA | UNA (14); Liberal (2) |
| Muntinlupa | 16 elected 2 ex-officio | No majority | One Muntinlupa | One Muntinlupa (16) |
| Navotas | 12 elected 2 ex-officio | Navoteño | Navoteño | Navoteño (12) |
| Parañaque | 16 elected 2 ex-officio | PDP–Laban | PDP–Laban | PDP–Laban (11); Lakas (1); LDP (1); Aksyon (1); NPC (1); Independent (1) |
| Pasay | 12 elected 2 ex-officio | PDP–Laban | PDP–Laban | PDP–Laban (11); PFP (1) |
| Pasig | 12 elected 2 ex-officio | Nacionalista | NPC | NPC (8); Aksyon (2); Nacionalista (1); PDDS (1) |
| Pateros (municipality) | 12 elected 2 ex-officio | PDP–Laban | No majority | Aksyon (6); Nacionalista (4); PPP (2) |
| Quezon City | 36 elected 2 ex-officio | SBP | SBP | SBP (25); Lakas (5); Nacionalista (3); PDP–Laban (1); FRPAMM (1); NPC (1) |
| San Juan | 12 elected 2 ex-officio | PMP | PDP–Laban | PDP–Laban (12) |
| Taguig | 16 elected 2 ex-officio | Nacionalista | Nacionalista | Nacionalista (16) |
| Valenzuela | 12 elected 2 ex-officio | NPC | NPC | NPC (10); Lakas (1); PFP (1) |

== Caloocan ==
=== Mayor ===
Term-limited incumbent Mayor Oscar Malapitan of the Nacionalista Party ran for the House of Representatives in Caloocan's 1st legislative district.

Malapitan endorsed his son, Along Malapitan (PDP–Laban), won the election against representative Edgar Erice (Aksyon Demokratiko) and four other candidates.

| Candidate | Party | Votes | % |
|---|---|---|---|
| Along Malapitan | PDP–Laban | 314,903 | 56.13 |
| Edgar Erice | Aksyon Demokratiko | 242,086 | 43.15 |
| Roman Domasig Jr. | Independent | 1,370 | 0.24 |
| Toto Malunes | Independent | 901 | 0.16 |
| Jun Anquilan | Independent | 883 | 0.16 |
| Ruffy Nazareno Bayon-on | Independent | 876 | 0.16 |
| Total | | 561,019 | 100.00 |
| Total votes | | 582,521 | – |
| Registered voters/turnout | | 700,279 | 83.18 |
| PDP–Laban hold | | | |
Source: Commission on Elections

=== Vice Mayor ===
Term-limited incumbent Vice Mayor Maca Asistio of the Nationalist People's Coalition ran for the House of Representatives in Caloocan's 2nd legislative district.

Councilor Karina Teh (Nacionalista Party) won the election against city councilor PJ Malonzo (Aksyon Demokratiko) and Joseph Timbol (Independent).

| Candidate | Party | Votes | % |
|---|---|---|---|
| Karina Teh | Nacionalista Party | 324,568 | 62.28 |
| PJ Malonzo | Aksyon Demokratiko | 185,671 | 35.63 |
| Joseph Timbol | Independent | 10,864 | 2.08 |
| Total | | 521,103 | 100.00 |
| Total votes | | 582,521 | – |
| Registered voters/turnout | | 700,279 | 83.18 |
| Nacionalista gain from NPC | | | |
Source: Commission on Elections

=== City Council ===
Since Caloocan's redistricting in 2021, the Caloocan City Council is composed of 20 councilors, 18 of whom are elected.

The Nacionalista Party won 10 seats, becoming the largest party in the city council.

| Party | Votes | % | Seats | +/– |
|---|---|---|---|---|
| Nacionalista Party | 941,661 | 33.67 | 10 | +7 |
| Aksyon Demokratiko | 916,216 | 32.76 | 3 | +2 |
| PDP–Laban | 238,921 | 8.54 | 2 | –3 |
| Nationalist People's Coalition | 186,656 | 6.67 | 0 | –1 |
| Lakas-CMD | 171,699 | 6.14 | 2 | New |
| PROMDI | 96,856 | 3.46 | 0 | New |
| National Unity Party | 88,349 | 3.16 | 1 | New |
| Workers' and Peasants' Party | 42,064 | 1.50 | 0 | New |
| Partido Lakas ng Masa | 16,027 | 0.57 | 0 | New |
| Pederalismo ng Dugong Dakilang Samahan | 3,798 | 0.14 | 0 | New |
| Independent | 94,500 | 3.38 | 0 | 0 |
| Total | 2,796,747 | 100.00 | 18 | +6 |
| Total votes | 582,521 | – | | |
| Registered voters/turnout | 700,279 | 83.18 | | |

==== 1st district ====
Caloocan's 1st councilor district consists of the same area as Caloocan's 1st legislative district. Barangays 178 to 188 used to be a part of this councilor district until 2021, when they became part of the 3rd councilor district. Six councilors are elected from this councilor district.

17 candidates were included in the ballot.

| Candidate | Party | Votes | % |
|---|---|---|---|
| Enteng Malapitan (incumbent) | Nacionalista Party | 171,080 | 12.54 |
| Topet Adalem | Nacionalista Party | 138,308 | 10.14 |
| Kaye Nubla | Aksyon Demokratiko | 129,186 | 9.47 |
| Leah Bacolod | PDP–Laban | 129,046 | 9.46 |
| Vince Hernandez | Lakas–CMD | 123,420 | 9.05 |
| Alex Caralde | Nacionalista Party | 97,007 | 7.11 |
| Romy Rivera | PROMDI | 96,856 | 7.10 |
| Tonton Asistio | Nationalist People's Coalition | 90,820 | 6.66 |
| Inar Trinidad | Aksyon Demokratiko | 76,211 | 5.59 |
| Cenon Mayor | Aksyon Demokratiko | 70,575 | 5.17 |
| Gerry Viray | Aksyon Demokratiko | 69,672 | 5.11 |
| Mila Uy | Aksyon Demokratiko | 60,063 | 4.40 |
| Nick Repollo | Aksyon Demokratiko | 51,536 | 3.78 |
| Tyrone de Leon Sr. | Independent | 18,282 | 1.34 |
| Glenn Ymata | Partido Lakas ng Masa | 16,027 | 1.17 |
| Roberto Aquino Jr. | Independent | 15,733 | 1.15 |
| Rodolfo Maniago | Independent | 10,462 | 0.77 |
| Total | | 1,364,284 | 100.00 |
| Total votes | | 285,861 | – |
| Registered voters/turnout | | 342,766 | 83.40 |
Source: Commission on Elections

==== 2nd district ====
Caloocan's 2nd councilor district consists of the same area as Caloocan's 2nd legislative district. Six councilors are elected from this councilor district.

16 candidates were included in the ballot.

| Candidate | Party | Votes | % |
|---|---|---|---|
| Ed Aruelo (incumbent) | PDP–Laban | 109,875 | 12.07 |
| L.A. Asistio (incumbent) | Nacionalista Party | 92,245 | 10.14 |
| Lanz Almeda | National Unity Party | 88,349 | 9.71 |
| Carol Cunanan | Nacionalista Party | 85,746 | 9.42 |
| Wewel de Leon | Aksyon Demokratiko | 75,280 | 8.27 |
| Arnold Divina | Nacionalista Party | 67,688 | 7.44 |
| Carding Bagus (incumbent) | Aksyon Demokratiko | 67,185 | 7.38 |
| Mayen Mercado | Nationalist People's Coalition | 56,534 | 6.21 |
| Melvin Rufino | Nacionalista Party | 50,791 | 5.58 |
| Lemuel Simpauco | Aksyon Demokratiko | 48,800 | 5.36 |
| Rene Celis | Workers' and Peasants' Party | 42,064 | 4.62 |
| Armani Mikhail Alcayaga | Nationalist People's Coalition | 39,302 | 4.32 |
| Dennis Padilla | Aksyon Demokratiko | 32,208 | 3.54 |
| Merville Orozco | Aksyon Demokratiko | 28,872 | 3.17 |
| Noel Cabuhat | Independent | 16,031 | 1.76 |
| Robert Antonio | Independent | 9,119 | 1.00 |
| Total | | 910,089 | 100.00 |
| Total votes | | 190,967 | – |
| Registered voters/turnout | | 233,294 | 81.86 |
Source: Commission on Elections

==== 3rd district ====
Caloocan's 3rd councilor district consists of the same area as Caloocan's 3rd legislative district. The councilor district was created in 2021, with Barangays 178 to 188 from the 1st councilor district. Six councilors are elected from this councilor district.

15 candidates were included in the ballot.

| Candidate | Party | Votes | % |
|---|---|---|---|
| Win Abel | Nacionalista Party | 60,336 | 11.55 |
| King Echiverri | Aksyon Demokratiko | 52,696 | 10.09 |
| Bullet Prado | Nacionalista Party | 49,659 | 9.51 |
| Onet Henson | Nacionalista Party | 49,375 | 9.45 |
| May Africa | Lakas–CMD | 48,279 | 9.24 |
| Tess Ceralde | Nacionalista Party | 42,560 | 8.15 |
| Ato Oliva | Aksyon Demokratiko | 40,227 | 7.70 |
| Luis Tito Varela | Nacionalista Party | 36,866 | 7.06 |
| Joma Ramirez | Aksyon Demokratiko | 34,663 | 6.64 |
| Rudy Brin | Aksyon Demokratiko | 29,347 | 5.62 |
| Nico Cammayo | Aksyon Demokratiko | 28,242 | 5.41 |
| Hazel Segui Quinto | Aksyon Demokratiko | 21,453 | 4.11 |
| Alfred Vargas | Independent | 19,523 | 3.74 |
| Carlos Amador Fenequito | Independent | 5,350 | 1.02 |
| Earny Palma | Pederalismo ng Dugong Dakilang Samahan | 3,798 | 0.73 |
| Total | | 522,374 | 100.00 |
| Total votes | | 105,693 | – |
| Registered voters/turnout | | 124,219 | 85.09 |
Source: Commission on Elections

== Las Piñas ==
=== Mayor ===
Incumbent Mayor Imelda Aguilar of the Nacionalista Party ran for a third term. She was previously affiliated with the Nationalist People's Coalition.

Aguilar won re-election against Ferdinand Eusebio (Independent), Rey Rivera (Ang Kapatiran), former Las Piñas vice mayor Louie Casimiro (Independent), former city councilor Benjamin Gonzales (Independent) and four other candidates.

| Candidate | Party | Votes | % |
|---|---|---|---|
| Imelda Aguilar (incumbent) | Nacionalista Party | 108,644 | 47.90 |
| Ferdinand Eusebio | Independent | 38,285 | 16.88 |
| Rey Rivera | Ang Kapatiran | 35,531 | 15.67 |
| Louie Casimiro | Independent | 28,338 | 12.49 |
| Benjamin Gonzales | Independent | 5,593 | 2.47 |
| Antonio Abellar Jr. | Partido Maharlika | 4,469 | 1.97 |
| Aladin de Jesus | Independent | 2,727 | 1.20 |
| Michael Maestrado | Independent | 2,705 | 1.19 |
| Simnar Gran | Partido para sa Demokratikong Reporma | 504 | 0.22 |
| Total | | 226,796 | 100.00 |
| Total votes | | 242,024 | – |
| Registered voters/turnout | | 291,074 | 83.15 |
| Nacionalista hold | | | |
Source: Commission on Elections

=== Vice Mayor ===
Incumbent Vice Mayor April Aguilar of the Nacionalista Party ran for a second term. She was previously affiliated with the Nationalist People's Coalition.

Aguilar won re-election against three other candidates.

| Candidate | Party | Votes | % |
|---|---|---|---|
| April Aguilar (incumbent) | Nacionalista Party | 123,457 | 58.34 |
| Jerry delos Reyes | Ang Kapatiran | 44,991 | 21.26 |
| Ed Angeles | Independent | 35,143 | 16.61 |
| Antonio Luna | Independent | 8,019 | 3.79 |
| Total | | 211,610 | 100.00 |
| Total votes | | 242,024 | – |
| Registered voters/turnout | | 291,074 | 83.15 |
| Nacionalista hold | | | |
Source: Commission on Elections

=== City Council ===
The Las Piñas City Council is composed of 14 councilors, 12 of whom are elected.

The Nacionalista Party won eight seats, gaining a majority in the city council.

| Party | Votes | % | Seats | +/– |
|---|---|---|---|---|
| Nacionalista Party | 592,527 | 54.48 | 8 | +7 |
| Aksyon Demokratiko | 66,923 | 6.15 | 1 | New |
| Ang Kapatiran | 31,679 | 2.91 | 0 | New |
| Partido Maharlika | 26,085 | 2.40 | 0 | New |
| Workers' and Peasants' Party | 11,896 | 1.09 | 0 | New |
| Independent | 358,500 | 32.96 | 3 | +3 |
| Total | 1,087,610 | 100.00 | 12 | 0 |
| Total votes | 242,024 | – | | |
| Registered voters/turnout | 291,074 | 83.15 | | |

==== 1st district ====
Las Piñas's 1st city district is composed of the barangays of BF International Village, Daniel Fajardo, Elias Aldana, Ilaya, Manuyo Uno, Manuyo Dos, Pamplona Uno, Pamplona Tres, Pulang Lupa Uno, Pulang Lupa Dos, Talon Uno and Zapote. Six councilors are elected from this councilor district.

18 candidates were included in the ballot.

| Candidate | Party | Votes | % |
|---|---|---|---|
| Mark Anthony Santos | Independent | 62,310 | 11.01 |
| Jess Bustamante | Independent | 59,287 | 10.48 |
| Peewee Aguilar (incumbent) | Nacionalista Party | 59,001 | 10.43 |
| Rex Riguera (incumbent) | Nacionalista Party | 50,816 | 8.98 |
| Oscar Peña (incumbent) | Nacionalista Party | 50,056 | 8.85 |
| Florante dela Cruz (incumbent) | Nacionalista Party | 48,166 | 8.51 |
| Steve Miranda (incumbent) | Nacionalista Party | 44,198 | 7.81 |
| Rey Balanag (incumbent) | Nacionalista Party | 33,676 | 5.95 |
| Davey John Medidas | Independent | 22,268 | 3.94 |
| Rick Jason Someros | Independent | 19,800 | 3.50 |
| Michael Castillo | Independent | 16,535 | 2.92 |
| Anabelle Rondilla | Ang Kapatiran | 15,789 | 2.79 |
| Zosimo Velasquez | Independent | 15,688 | 2.77 |
| Enrico Loberiza | Independent | 15,602 | 2.76 |
| Nestor Lindayao | Independent | 14,786 | 2.61 |
| Leo Mallo | Independent | 13,019 | 2.30 |
| Jeric Antoni Ver Clave | Independent | 12,845 | 2.27 |
| Cyril Flores David | Workers' and Peasants' Party | 11,896 | 2.10 |
| Total | | 565,738 | 100.00 |
| Total votes | | 124,136 | – |
Source: Commission on Elections

==== 2nd district ====
Las Piñas's 2nd councilor district is composed of the barangays of Almanza Uno, Almanza Dos, Pamplona Dos, Pilar, Talon Dos, Talon Tres, Talon Kuatro and Talon Singko. Six councilors are elected from this councilor district.

15 candidates were included in the ballot.

| Candidate | Party | Votes | % |
|---|---|---|---|
| Henry Medina | Aksyon Demokratiko | 66,923 | 12.82 |
| Louie Bustamante (incumbent) | Nacionalista Party | 65,236 | 12.50 |
| Ruben Ramos (incumbent) | Nacionalista Party | 59,593 | 11.42 |
| Lord Aguilar (incumbent) | Nacionalista Party | 56,867 | 10.90 |
| Danny Hernandez (incumbent) | Nacionalista Party | 48,844 | 9.36 |
| Emmanuel Luis Casimiro | Independent | 41,048 | 7.87 |
| Gerry Sangga (incumbent) | Nacionalista Party | 38,432 | 7.36 |
| Luis Riguerra | Nacionalista Party | 37,642 | 7.21 |
| Edgardo Parungao | Independent | 27,068 | 5.19 |
| Jenny Guinto | Independent | 23,479 | 4.50 |
| Abet Goco | Ang Kapatiran | 15,890 | 3.04 |
| Pao Muhlfeld | Independent | 14,765 | 2.83 |
| Miguel Acebedo | Partido Maharlika | 10,817 | 2.07 |
| Joy Mae Astrologo | Partido Maharlika | 7,859 | 1.51 |
| Julian Teoxon Jr. | Partido Maharlika | 7,409 | 1.42 |
| Total | | 521,872 | 100.00 |
| Total votes | | 117,888 | – |
Source: Commission on Elections

== Makati ==
=== Mayor ===
Incumbent Mayor Abigail Binay of the Makatizens United Party ran for a third term. She was previously affiliated with the United Nationalist Alliance.

Binay won re-election against Joel Hernandez (Independent).

| Candidate | Party | Votes | % |
|---|---|---|---|
| Abigail Binay (incumbent) | Makatizens United Party | 338,819 | 95.32 |
| Joel Hernandez | Independent | 16,640 | 4.68 |
| Total | | 355,459 | 100.00 |
| Total votes | | 375,103 | – |
| Registered voters/turnout | | 458,362 | 81.84 |
| MKTZNU hold | | | |
Source: Commission on Elections

=== Vice Mayor ===
Incumbent Vice Mayor Monique Lagdameo of the Makatizens United Party ran for a third term. She was previously affiliated with the United Nationalist Alliance.

Lagdameo won re-election against Rod Biolena (Independent).

| Candidate | Party | Votes | % |
|---|---|---|---|
| Monique Lagdameo (incumbent) | Makatizens United Party | 314,070 | 93.32 |
| Rod Biolena | Independent | 22,498 | 6.68 |
| Total | | 336,568 | 100.00 |
| Total votes | | 375,103 | – |
| Registered voters/turnout | | 458,362 | 81.84 |
| MKTZNU hold | | | |
Source: Commission on Elections

=== City Council ===
The Makati City Council is composed of 18 councilors, 16 of whom are elected.

The Makatizens United Party won 15 seats, gaining a majority in the city council.

| Party | Votes | % | Seats | +/– |
|---|---|---|---|---|
| Makatizens United Party | 1,607,822 | 69.98 | 15 | New |
| Reform Party | 587,169 | 25.56 | 1 | New |
| Partido Pederal ng Maharlika | 20,141 | 0.88 | 0 | New |
| Independent | 82,359 | 3.58 | 0 | 0 |
| Total | 2,297,491 | 100.00 | 16 | 0 |
| Total votes | 375,103 | – | | |
| Registered voters/turnout | 458,362 | 81.84 | | |

==== 1st district ====
Makati's 1st councilor district consists of the same area as Makati's 1st legislative district. Eight councilors are elected from this councilor district.

18 candidates were included in the ballot.

| Candidate | Party | Votes | % |
|---|---|---|---|
| Jhong Hilario (incumbent) | Makatizens United Party | 121,111 | 11.73 |
| Alcine Yabut (incumbent) | Makatizens United Party | 107,045 | 10.36 |
| Martin Arenas (incumbent) | Makatizens United Party | 92,856 | 8.99 |
| Joey Villena (incumbent) | Makatizens United Party | 88,531 | 8.57 |
| Carmina Ortega | Makatizens United Party | 85,695 | 8.30 |
| Rene Andrei Saguisag (incumbent) | Makatizens United Party | 85,438 | 8.27 |
| Luis Javier Jr. (incumbent) | Makatizens United Party | 84,633 | 8.19 |
| Armando Padilla (incumbent) | Makatizens United Party | 82,940 | 8.03 |
| Ferdie Eusebio | Reform Party | 55,107 | 5.34 |
| Tosca Puno-Ramos (incumbent) | Reform Party | 48,992 | 4.74 |
| Arlene Ortega | Reform Party | 46,229 | 4.48 |
| Romy Medina | Reform Party | 39,544 | 3.83 |
| Battle Batalla | Independent | 26,975 | 2.61 |
| Jojo Salvador | Reform Party | 22,352 | 2.16 |
| Yoyoy Cruz | Reform Party | 15,969 | 1.55 |
| Rafael Ojeda Jr. | Independent | 10,213 | 0.99 |
| Mariano Lubo | Independent | 10,116 | 0.98 |
| Victorino Calinawan | Independent | 9,150 | 0.89 |
| Total | | 1,032,896 | 100.00 |
| Total votes | | 171,281 | – |
| Registered voters/turnout | | 209,859 | 81.62 |
Source: Commission on Elections

==== 2nd district ====
Makati's 2nd councilor district consists of the same area as Makati's 2nd legislative district. Eight councilors are elected from this councilor district.

17 candidates were included in the ballot.

| Candidate | Party | Votes | % |
|---|---|---|---|
| Ina Sarosa (incumbent) | Makatizens United Party | 136,836 | 10.82 |
| Alden Almario (incumbent) | Makatizens United Party | 121,861 | 9.64 |
| Sammy Cruz (incumbent) | Makatizens United Party | 115,977 | 9.17 |
| Doris Arayon (incumbent) | Makatizens United Party | 107,027 | 8.46 |
| Bong Ariones | Makatizens United Party | 105,236 | 8.32 |
| Bodik Baniqued (incumbent) | Makatizens United Party | 103,291 | 8.17 |
| Ed Marquez | Makatizens United Party | 89,161 | 7.05 |
| Shirley Aspillaga (incumbent) | Reform Party | 80,487 | 6.36 |
| Ryan Soler Calimbahin | Makatizens United Party | 80,184 | 6.34 |
| Leo Magpantay (incumbent) | Reform Party | 76,586 | 6.06 |
| Boyet Cruzado (incumbent) | Reform Party | 73,855 | 5.84 |
| Ruth Tolentino | Reform Party | 54,677 | 4.32 |
| Baby Olfato | Reform Party | 42,341 | 3.35 |
| Leo Bes | Reform Party | 31,030 | 2.45 |
| Benny Abatay | Partido Pederal ng Maharlika | 20,141 | 1.59 |
| Roger Jurisprudencia | Independent | 13,683 | 1.08 |
| Fred Gamotin | Independent | 12,222 | 0.97 |
| Total | | 1,264,595 | 100.00 |
| Total votes | | 203,822 | – |
| Registered voters/turnout | | 248,503 | 82.02 |
Source: Commission on Elections

== Malabon ==
=== Mayor ===
Incumbent Mayor Antolin Oreta III of the Liberal Party is term-limited.

Oreta endorsed his brother, city councilor Enzo Oreta of the National Unity Party, who was defeated by former Malabon vice mayor Jeannie Sandoval of the Nacionalista Party.

| Candidate | Party | Votes | % |
|---|---|---|---|
| Jeannie Sandoval | Nacionalista Party | 94,826 | 50.34 |
| Enzo Oreta | National Unity Party | 93,547 | 49.66 |
| Total | | 188,373 | 100.00 |
| Total votes | | 196,218 | – |
| Registered voters/turnout | | 258,115 | 76.02 |
| Nacionalista gain from Liberal | | | |
Source: Commission on Elections

=== Vice Mayor ===
Incumbent Vice Mayor Ninong dela Cruz of the National Unity Party ran for a second term.

Dela Cruz won re-election against former Department of Social Welfare and Development undersecretary Jayjay Yambao (Partido Federal ng Pilipinas).

| Candidate | Party | Votes | % |
|---|---|---|---|
| Ninong dela Cruz (incumbent) | National Unity Party | 98,060 | 55.38 |
| Jayjay Yambao | Partido Federal ng Pilipinas | 79,019 | 44.62 |
| Total | | 177,079 | 100.00 |
| Total votes | | 196,218 | – |
| Registered voters/turnout | | 258,115 | 76.02 |
| NUP hold | | | |
Source: Commission on Elections

=== City Council ===
The Malabon City Council is composed of 14 councilors, 12 of whom are elected.

The Nacionalista Party won three seats, remaining as the largest party in the city council.

| Party | Votes | % | Seats | +/– |
|---|---|---|---|---|
| Nacionalista Party | 193,821 | 21.93 | 3 | 0 |
| Nationalist People's Coalition | 181,435 | 20.53 | 2 | 0 |
| Aksyon Demokratiko | 146,848 | 16.62 | 2 | +2 |
| Liberal Party | 139,289 | 15.76 | 2 | –1 |
| National Unity Party | 103,030 | 11.66 | 2 | 0 |
| United Nationalist Alliance | 43,334 | 4.90 | 1 | 0 |
| Independent | 76,011 | 8.60 | 0 | 0 |
| Total | 883,768 | 100.00 | 12 | 0 |
| Total votes | 196,218 | – | | |
| Registered voters/turnout | 258,115 | 76.02 | | |

==== 1st district ====
Malabon's 1st councilor district consists of the barangays of Baritan, Bayan-bayanan, Catmon, Concepcion, Dampalit, Flores, Hulong Duhat, Ibaba, Maysilo, Muzon, Niugan, Panghulo, San Agustin, Santulan and Tañong. Six councilors are elected from this councilor district.

11 candidates were included in the ballot.

| Candidate | Party | Votes | % |
|---|---|---|---|
| Niño Noel | Nationalist People's Coalition | 58,348 | 12.32 |
| Jap Garcia (incumbent) | Aksyon Demokratiko | 58,032 | 12.25 |
| Maricar Torres | Nacionalista Party | 51,976 | 10.97 |
| Paulo Oreta (incumbent) | Nationalist People's Coalition | 45,452 | 9.59 |
| Gerry Bernardo | National Unity Party | 44,881 | 9.47 |
| Leslie Yambao (incumbent) | United Nationalist Alliance | 43,334 | 9.15 |
| Jaime Dumalaog | Liberal Party | 42,025 | 8.87 |
| Jon Cruz | Independent | 39,732 | 8.39 |
| Payapa Ona (incumbent) | Nacionalista Party | 39,562 | 8.35 |
| Joey Sabaricos | Aksyon Demokratiko | 35,092 | 7.41 |
| Joseph Legaspi | Independent | 15,278 | 3.23 |
| Total | | 473,712 | 100.00 |
| Total votes | | 103,911 | – |
Source: Commission on Elections

==== 2nd district ====
Malabon's 2nd councilor district consists of the barangays of Acacia, Longos, Potrero, Tinajeros, Tonsuya and Tugatog. Six councilors are elected from this councilor district.

10 candidates were included in the ballot.

| Candidate | Party | Votes | % |
|---|---|---|---|
| Dado Cunanan (incumbent) | National Unity Party | 58,149 | 14.18 |
| Edward Nolasco (incumbent) | Nacionalista Party | 56,022 | 13.66 |
| Jasper Cruz | Aksyon Demokratiko | 53,724 | 13.10 |
| Len Yanga | Liberal Party | 49,285 | 12.02 |
| Peng Mañalac (incumbent) | Liberal Party | 47,979 | 11.70 |
| Nadja Marie Vicencio (incumbent) | Nacionalista Party | 46,261 | 11.28 |
| Ambet Bautista | Nationalist People's Coalition | 45,077 | 10.99 |
| Jonbalot Lim | Nationalist People's Coalition | 32,558 | 7.94 |
| Niña Fatima Jimenez | Independent | 12,003 | 2.93 |
| Robert Ballentos | Independent | 8,998 | 2.19 |
| Total | | 410,056 | 100.00 |
| Total votes | | 92,307 | – |
Source: Commission on Elections

== Mandaluyong ==
=== Mayor ===
Incumbent Mayor Carmelita Abalos of PDP–Laban ran for vice mayor of Mandaluyong.

PDP–Laban nominated Abalos' father-in-law, former Commission on Elections chairman Benjamin Abalos, who won the election against Florencio Solomon (Independent).

| Candidate | Party | Votes | % |
|---|---|---|---|
| Benjamin Abalos | PDP–Laban | 136,849 | 84.84 |
| Florencio Solomon | Independent | 24,457 | 15.16 |
| Total | | 161,306 | 100.00 |
| Total votes | | 184,423 | – |
| Registered voters/turnout | | 232,492 | 79.32 |
| PDP–Laban hold | | | |
Source: Commission on Elections

=== Vice Mayor ===
Incumbent Vice Mayor Anthony Suva of PDP–Laban ran for the Mandaluyong City Council in the 1st councilor district.

PDP–Laban nominated Mandaluyong mayor Carmelita Abalos, who won the election unopposed.

| Candidate | Party | Votes | % |
|---|---|---|---|
| Carmelita Abalos | PDP–Laban | 148,690 | 100.00 |
| Total | | 148,690 | 100.00 |
| Total votes | | 184,423 | – |
| Registered voters/turnout | | 232,492 | 79.32 |
| PDP–Laban hold | | | |
Source: Commission on Elections

=== City Council ===
The Mandaluyong City Council is composed of 14 councilors, 12 of whom are elected.

PDP–Laban won eight seats, maintaining its majority in the city council.

| Party | Votes | % | Seats | +/– |
|---|---|---|---|---|
| PDP–Laban | 475,831 | 57.97 | 8 | –2 |
| Aksyon Demokratiko | 72,454 | 8.83 | 1 | 0 |
| Partido Federal ng Pilipinas | 41,356 | 5.04 | 0 | 0 |
| Nacionalista Party | 36,799 | 4.48 | 1 | New |
| Independent | 194,378 | 23.68 | 2 | +1 |
| Total | 820,818 | 100.00 | 12 | 0 |
| Total votes | 184,423 | – | | |
| Registered voters/turnout | 232,492 | 79.32 | | |

==== 1st district ====
Mandaluyong's 1st councilor district consists of the barangays of Addition Hills, Bagong Silang, Burol, Daang Bakal, Hagdan Bato Itaas, Hagdan Bato Libis, Harapin Ang Bukas, Highway Hills, Mauway, New Zañiga, Pag-Asa, Pleasant Hills, Poblacion and Wack-Wack Greenhills. Six councilors are elected from this councilor district.

Ten candidates were included in the ballot.

| Candidate | Party | Votes | % |
|---|---|---|---|
| Anthony Suva | PDP–Laban | 76,855 | 15.58 |
| Elton Yap (incumbent) | PDP–Laban | 72,706 | 14.74 |
| Danny de Guzman (incumbent) | Aksyon Demokratiko | 72,454 | 14.69 |
| Kuyog Posadas (incumbent) | PDP–Laban | 61,467 | 12.46 |
| Mariz Manalo | Independent | 60,073 | 12.18 |
| Junis Alim (incumbent) | PDP–Laban | 54,034 | 10.96 |
| Miguel Carlos Aquino | PDP–Laban | 45,792 | 9.28 |
| MJ Angga | Partido Federal ng Pilipinas | 27,278 | 5.53 |
| Fermin Romualdez | Partido Federal ng Pilipinas | 14,078 | 2.85 |
| Romeo Cabus | Independent | 8,470 | 1.72 |
| Total | | 493,207 | 100.00 |
| Total votes | | 110,229 | – |
Source: Commission on Elections

==== 2nd district ====
Mandaluyong's 2nd councilor district consists of the barangays of Barangka Drive, Barangka Ibaba, Barangka Ilaya, Barangka Itaas, Buayang Bato, Hulo, Mabini–J.Rizal, Malamig, Namayan, Old Zañiga, Plainview, San Jose and Vergara. Six councilors are elected from this councilor district.

Nine candidates were included in the ballot.

| Candidate | Party | Votes | % |
|---|---|---|---|
| Benjie Abalos (incumbent) | PDP–Laban | 45,984 | 14.04 |
| Alex Sta. Maria | PDP–Laban | 44,362 | 13.54 |
| Regie Antiojo | Independent | 38,178 | 11.65 |
| Leslie Cruz | PDP–Laban | 37,476 | 11.44 |
| Mike Ocampo | PDP–Laban | 37,155 | 11.34 |
| Botong Gonzales Cuejilo (incumbent) | Nacionalista Party | 36,799 | 11.23 |
| Marco Merza | Independent | 30,958 | 9.45 |
| Josh Bacar | Independent | 30,045 | 9.17 |
| Rogie Gonzales | Independent | 15,852 | 4.84 |
| Ed Geronimo | Independent | 10,802 | 3.30 |
| Total | | 327,611 | 100.00 |
| Total votes | | 74,194 | – |
Source: Commission on Elections

== Manila ==
=== Mayor ===
Incumbent Mayor Isko Moreno of Aksyon Demokratiko ran for President of the Philippines. He was previously affiliated with Asenso Manileño.

Moreno endorsed Manila vice mayor Honey Lacuna of Asenso Manileño, who won the election against Alex Lopez (Partido Federal ng Pilipinas), former representative Amado Bagatsing (Kabalikat ng Bayan sa Kaunlaran), Cristy Lim (Partido para sa Demokratikong Reporma), Elmer Jamias (People's Reform Party) and Onofre Abad (Independent).

| Candidate | Party | Votes | % |
|---|---|---|---|
| Honey Lacuna | Asenso Manileño | 538,595 | 63.68 |
| Alex Lopez | Partido Federal ng Pilipinas | 166,908 | 19.74 |
| Amado Bagatsing | Kabalikat ng Bayan sa Kaunlaran | 118,694 | 14.03 |
| Cristy Lim | Partido para sa Demokratikong Reporma | 14,857 | 1.76 |
| Elmer Jamias | People's Reform Party | 4,057 | 0.48 |
| Onofre Abad | Independent | 2,618 | 0.31 |
| Total | | 845,729 | 100.00 |
| Total votes | | 886,133 | – |
| Registered voters/turnout | | 1,133,042 | 78.21 |
| Asenso Manileño gain from Aksyon | | | |
Source: Commission on Elections

=== Vice Mayor ===
Incumbent Vice Mayor Honey Lacuna (Asenso Manileño) ran for mayor of Manila.

Asenso Manileño nominated representative Yul Servo, who won the election against Raymond Bagatsing (Kilusang Bagong Lipunan) and two other candidates.

| Candidate | Party | Votes | % |
|---|---|---|---|
| Yul Servo | Asenso Manileño | 586,855 | 73.67 |
| Raymond Bagatsing | Kilusang Bagong Lipunan | 185,431 | 23.28 |
| Arvin Reyes | Independent | 12,310 | 1.55 |
| Lucy Lapinig | Partido para sa Demokratikong Reporma | 12,041 | 1.51 |
| Total | | 796,637 | 100.00 |
| Total votes | | 886,133 | – |
| Registered voters/turnout | | 1,133,042 | 78.21 |
| Asenso Manileño hold | | | |
Source: Commission on Elections

=== City Council ===
The Manila City Council is composed of 38 councilors, 36 of whom are elected.

Asenso Manileño won 34 seats, gaining a majority in the city council.

| Party | Votes | % | Seats | +/– |
|---|---|---|---|---|
| Asenso Manileño | 2,950,976 | 68.56 | 34 | +18 |
| PDP–Laban | 576,953 | 13.40 | 0 | –1 |
| Liberal Party | 110,823 | 2.57 | 0 | New |
| PROMDI | 91,456 | 2.12 | 0 | New |
| Nacionalista Party | 83,943 | 1.95 | 0 | –1 |
| Partido Federal ng Pilipinas | 38,746 | 0.90 | 0 | New |
| Kabalikat ng Bayan sa Kaunlaran | 35,909 | 0.83 | 0 | –1 |
| United Nationalist Alliance | 9,389 | 0.22 | 0 | New |
| Partido para sa Demokratikong Reporma | 8,671 | 0.20 | 0 | New |
| Partido Maharlika | 7,796 | 0.18 | 0 | New |
| Pederalismo ng Dugong Dakilang Samahan | 6,013 | 0.14 | 0 | New |
| Independent | 383,475 | 8.91 | 2 | 0 |
| Total | 4,304,150 | 100.00 | 36 | 0 |
| Total votes | 886,133 | – | | |
| Registered voters/turnout | 1,133,042 | 78.21 | | |
Source: Commission on Elections

==== 1st district ====
Manila's 1st councilor district consists of the same area as Manila's 1st legislative district. Six councilors are elected from this councilor district.

20 candidates were included in the ballot.

| Candidate | Party | Votes | % |
|---|---|---|---|
| Jesus Fajardo (incumbent) | Asenso Manileño | 116,225 | 11.44 |
| Banzai Nieva (incumbent) | Asenso Manileño | 115,362 | 11.35 |
| Niño dela Cruz | Asenso Manileño | 107,597 | 10.59 |
| Bobby Lim (incumbent) | Asenso Manileño | 101,466 | 9.98 |
| Irma Alfonso (incumbent) | Asenso Manileño | 101,222 | 9.96 |
| Marjun Isidro | Asenso Manileño | 98,247 | 9.67 |
| Mokong Tan | Liberal Party | 93,580 | 9.21 |
| Peter Ong (incumbent) | PROMDI | 84,527 | 8.32 |
| Eugene Santiago | PDP–Laban | 39,310 | 3.87 |
| Marcelino Pedrozo Jr. | PDP–Laban | 38,093 | 3.75 |
| Eduardo Solis | PDP–Laban | 26,207 | 2.58 |
| Joel Gungon | Independent | 21,108 | 2.08 |
| Bryan Mondejar | PDP–Laban | 17,245 | 1.70 |
| Toto Baldisimo | Liberal Party | 17,243 | 1.70 |
| Ferdie Sandoval | United Nationalist Alliance | 9,389 | 0.92 |
| Sylvia Felisa Manansala | Independent | 8,444 | 0.83 |
| Michael de Leon | Independent | 7,778 | 0.77 |
| Ian Halili | Partido para sa Demokratikong Reporma | 6,355 | 0.63 |
| Gilbert Tello | Independent | 4,053 | 0.40 |
| Dom Estabillo | Independent | 2,900 | 0.29 |
| Total | | 1,016,351 | 100.00 |
| Total votes | | 208,103 | – |
| Registered voters/turnout | | 264,362 | 78.72 |
Source: Commission on Elections

==== 2nd district ====
Manila's 2nd councilor district consists of the same area as Manila's 2nd legislative district. Six councilors are elected from this councilor district.

15 candidates were included in the ballot.

| Candidate | Party | Votes | % |
|---|---|---|---|
| Ruben Buenaventura | Asenso Manileño | 77,305 | 13.44 |
| Uno Lim (incumbent) | Asenso Manileño | 75,756 | 13.17 |
| Awi Sia (incumbent) | Asenso Manileño | 69,505 | 12.08 |
| Roma Robles (incumbent) | Asenso Manileño | 65,247 | 11.34 |
| Rodolfo Lacsamana | Independent | 64,732 | 11.25 |
| Macky Lacson (incumbent) | Asenso Manileño | 60,290 | 10.48 |
| Edward Tan (incumbent) | Asenso Manileño | 59,318 | 10.31 |
| Ivy Varona | Nacionalista Party | 32,007 | 5.56 |
| Reynulfo Sy | Nacionalista Party | 25,489 | 4.43 |
| Roneil Sanguyo | Nacionalista Party | 12,695 | 2.21 |
| Ponching Orioste | Independent | 11,566 | 2.01 |
| Alex Javalla | Nacionalista Party | 9,106 | 1.58 |
| Boyet Evangelista | Nacionalista Party | 4,646 | 0.81 |
| Mike Rivera | Independent | 4,290 | 0.75 |
| Oscar Baria III | Independent | 3,338 | 0.58 |
| Total | | 575,290 | 100.00 |
| Total votes | | 120,987 | – |
| Registered voters/turnout | | 152,929 | 79.11 |
Source: Commission on Elections

==== 3rd district ====
Manila's 3rd councilor district consists of the same area as Manila's 3rd legislative district. Six councilors are elected from this councilor district.

15 candidates were included in the ballot.

| Candidate | Party | Votes | % |
|---|---|---|---|
| Apple Nieto (incumbent) | Asenso Manileño | 81,675 | 14.47 |
| Pamela Fugoso (incumbent) | Asenso Manileño | 76,729 | 13.59 |
| Jong Isip (incumbent) | Asenso Manileño | 75,038 | 13.29 |
| Tol Zarcal | Asenso Manileño | 67,020 | 11.87 |
| Terrence Alibarbar (incumbent) | Asenso Manileño | 65,117 | 11.53 |
| Maile Atienza | Asenso Manileño | 64,713 | 11.46 |
| Joey Uy Jamisola | PDP–Laban | 39,180 | 6.94 |
| Johnny dela Cruz | PDP–Laban | 18,781 | 3.33 |
| Nino Magno | Partido Federal ng Pilipinas | 15,666 | 2.77 |
| Caloy Cruz | PDP–Laban | 14,940 | 2.65 |
| Nelson Ty | PDP–Laban | 9,053 | 1.60 |
| Aileen Rosales | PDP–Laban | 7,398 | 1.31 |
| Roderick Aurello | Independent | 6,841 | 1.21 |
| Roberto Diaz | Independent | 5,391 | 0.95 |
| Bernie Manikan | Independent | 5,087 | 0.90 |
| Anthony de Guzman | Independent | 4,349 | 0.77 |
| Henryson Melon | Independent | 3,036 | 0.54 |
| Jun Landicho | Partido para sa Demokratikong Reporma | 2,316 | 0.41 |
| Norland Azon Gacutan | Independent | 2,286 | 0.40 |
| Total | | 564,616 | 100.00 |
| Total votes | | 115,614 | – |
| Registered voters/turnout | | 164,664 | 70.21 |
Source: Commission on Elections

==== 4th district ====
Manila's 4th councilor district consists of the same area as Manila's 4th legislative district. Six councilors are elected from this councilor district.

22 candidates were included in the ballot.

| Candidate | Party | Votes | % |
|---|---|---|---|
| Louie Chua (incumbent) | Asenso Manileño | 90,242 | 13.81 |
| Krys Bacani (incumbent) | Asenso Manileño | 79,501 | 12.17 |
| JTV Villanueva (incumbent) | Asenso Manileño | 73,937 | 11.32 |
| Don Juan Bagatsing (incumbent) | Asenso Manileño | 67,717 | 10.36 |
| Science Reyes (incumbent) | Asenso Manileño | 66,592 | 10.19 |
| Lady Quintos | Asenso Manileño | 65,477 | 10.02 |
| Havy Bagatsing | Independent | 42,874 | 6.56 |
| Xtian Floirendo | PDP–Laban | 34,229 | 5.24 |
| Bimbo Quintos | PDP–Laban | 32,966 | 5.05 |
| Carlo dela Cruz | PDP–Laban | 17,601 | 2.69 |
| Jorge Andrew Lopez | PDP–Laban | 16,177 | 2.48 |
| Raquel Gabriel | PDP–Laban | 12,322 | 1.89 |
| Kevin Cosme | Independent | 9,912 | 1.52 |
| Emil Bryan Toledo | PROMDI | 6,929 | 1.06 |
| Edwin Cosme | Independent | 6,476 | 0.99 |
| Vic Alejaga | Independent | 6,128 | 0.94 |
| Benjie Cosme | Independent | 5,915 | 0.91 |
| Jazel Panganiban | Independent | 5,267 | 0.81 |
| Al Tan | Independent | 4,610 | 0.71 |
| Rosmar Tan | PDP–Laban | 4,383 | 0.67 |
| John Matrimonio | Independent | 2,091 | 0.32 |
| Mary Ann Victori | Independent | 1,981 | 0.30 |
| Total | | 653,327 | 100.00 |
| Total votes | | 132,964 | – |
| Registered voters/turnout | | 162,767 | 81.69 |
Source: Commission on Elections

==== 5th district ====
Manila's 5th councilor district consists of the same area as Manila's 5th legislative district. Six councilors are elected from this councilor district.

23 candidates were included in the ballot.

| Candidate | Party | Votes | % |
|---|---|---|---|
| Laris Borromeo (incumbent) | Asenso Manileño | 99,812 | 11.76 |
| Boy Isip (incumbent) | Asenso Manileño | 96,145 | 11.33 |
| Mon Yupangco (incumbent) | Asenso Manileño | 95,027 | 11.19 |
| Charry Ortega (incumbent) | Asenso Manileño | 90,955 | 10.72 |
| Jaybee Hizon | Asenso Manileño | 87,792 | 10.34 |
| Bobby Espiritu | Independent | 85,685 | 10.09 |
| Nikko Atienza | Asenso Manileño | 79,031 | 9.31 |
| Roderick Valbuena | Kabalikat ng Bayan sa Kaunlaran | 35,909 | 4.23 |
| Felix Tobillo Jr. | PDP–Laban | 29,135 | 3.43 |
| Jaime Co Jr. | PDP–Laban | 22,493 | 2.65 |
| Rubee Cagasca | Independent | 22,343 | 2.63 |
| Ariel Dakis | PDP–Laban | 22,019 | 2.59 |
| Nathan Rellon | PDP–Laban | 17,773 | 2.09 |
| Ronnie Canlas | PDP–Laban | 14,975 | 1.76 |
| Malou Oscan | Partido Federal ng Pilipinas | 10,803 | 1.27 |
| Mahra Tamondong | Partido Federal ng Pilipinas | 8,114 | 0.96 |
| Strauss Tugnao | Partido Maharlika | 7,796 | 0.92 |
| Gladina Villar | Pederalismo ng Dugong Dakilang Samahan | 6,013 | 0.71 |
| Ronaldo Cruz | Partido Federal ng Pilipinas | 4,163 | 0.49 |
| Anthony Avila | Independent | 4,042 | 0.48 |
| Rufino Cantil Jr. | Independent | 3,236 | 0.38 |
| Wenifredo Limit | Independent | 2,999 | 0.35 |
| Injim Bacalso Bunayog | Independent | 2,594 | 0.31 |
| Total | | 848,854 | 100.00 |
| Total votes | | 175,386 | – |
| Registered voters/turnout | | 217,787 | 80.53 |
Source: Commission on Elections

==== 6th district ====
Manila's 6th councilor district consists of the same area as Manila's 6th legislative district. Six councilors are elected from this councilor district.

15 candidates were included in the ballot.

| Candidate | Party | Votes | % |
|---|---|---|---|
| Joey Uy | Asenso Manileño | 85,309 | 13.21 |
| Caloy Castañeda (incumbent) | Asenso Manileño | 85,228 | 13.20 |
| Philip Lacuna (incumbent) | Asenso Manileño | 82,076 | 12.71 |
| Lou Veloso (incumbent) | Asenso Manileño | 77,856 | 12.06 |
| Fog Abante | Asenso Manileño | 75,271 | 11.66 |
| Joel Par (incumbent) | Asenso Manileño | 75,176 | 11.64 |
| Pablo Dario Ocampo | PDP–Laban | 38,985 | 6.04 |
| Fernando Mercado | PDP–Laban | 38,833 | 6.01 |
| Cherry Veloira | PDP–Laban | 30,025 | 4.65 |
| Raffy Jimenez Crespo | PDP–Laban | 20,597 | 3.19 |
| Fernan Vergel | PDP–Laban | 14,233 | 2.20 |
| Owen Morales | Independent | 8,323 | 1.29 |
| Ernesto Go Jr. | Independent | 5,646 | 0.87 |
| Melvin Miranda | Independent | 4,416 | 0.68 |
| Luisito Claudio | Independent | 3,738 | 0.58 |
| Total | | 645,712 | 100.00 |
| Total votes | | 133,079 | – |
| Registered voters/turnout | | 170,533 | 78.04 |
Source: Commission on Elections

== Marikina ==
=== Mayor ===
Incumbent Mayor Marcelino Teodoro of the United Nationalist Alliance ran for a third term. He was previously affiliated with PDP–Laban.

Teodoro won re-election against representative Bayani Fernando (Nationalist People's Coalition).

| Candidate | Party | Votes | % |
|---|---|---|---|
| Marcelino Teodoro (incumbent) | United Nationalist Alliance | 183,878 | 82.08 |
| Bayani Fernando | Nationalist People's Coalition | 40,149 | 17.92 |
| Total | | 224,027 | 100.00 |
| Total votes | | 229,267 | – |
| Registered voters/turnout | | 260,749 | 87.93 |
| UNA hold | | | |
Source: Commission on Elections

=== Vice Mayor ===
Incumbent Vice Mayor Marion Andres of the United Nationalist Alliance ran for a second term. He was previously affiliated with the Nationalist People's Coalition.

Andres won the election against Barangay Tumana captain Ziffred Ancheta (Partido Federal ng Pilipinas) and two other candidates.

| Candidate | Party | Votes | % |
|---|---|---|---|
| Marion Andres (incumbent) | United Nationalist Alliance | 147,869 | 69.94 |
| Ziffred Ancheta | Partido Federal ng Pilipinas | 59,237 | 28.02 |
| Sherwin dela Cruz | Aksyon Demokratiko | 2,786 | 1.32 |
| Francis Joseph Acop | Partido Pederal ng Maharlika | 1,518 | 0.72 |
| Total | | 211,410 | 100.00 |
| Total votes | | 229,267 | – |
| Registered voters/turnout | | 260,749 | 87.93 |
| UNA hold | | | |
Source: Commission on Elections

=== City Council ===
The Marikina City Council is composed of 18 councilors, 16 of whom are elected.

The United Nationalist Alliance won 14 seats, gaining a majority in the city council.

| Party | Votes | % | Seats | +/– |
|---|---|---|---|---|
| United Nationalist Alliance | 810,301 | 54.97 | 14 | New |
| Liberal Party | 248,432 | 16.85 | 2 | –2 |
| Nationalist People's Coalition | 213,429 | 14.48 | 0 | –1 |
| Aksyon Demokratiko | 70,222 | 4.76 | 0 | New |
| PDP–Laban | 25,945 | 1.76 | 0 | –5 |
| Partido Pederal ng Maharlika | 14,896 | 1.01 | 0 | New |
| Partido Federal ng Pilipinas | 12,389 | 0.84 | 0 | 0 |
| People's Reform Party | 8,007 | 0.54 | 0 | New |
| Independent | 70,536 | 4.78 | 0 | –5 |
| Total | 1,474,157 | 100.00 | 16 | 0 |
| Total votes | 229,267 | – | | |
| Registered voters/turnout | 260,749 | 87.93 | | |

==== 1st district ====
Marikina's 1st councilor district consists of the same area as Marikina's 1st legislative district. Eight councilors are elected from this councilor district.

20 candidates were included in the ballot.

| Candidate | Party | Votes | % |
|---|---|---|---|
| Sam Ferriol (incumbent) | United Nationalist Alliance | 68,517 | 10.44 |
| Kate de Guzman (incumbent) | United Nationalist Alliance | 60,036 | 9.15 |
| Carl Africa (incumbent) | United Nationalist Alliance | 59,135 | 9.01 |
| Rommel Acuña (incumbent) | United Nationalist Alliance | 55,854 | 8.51 |
| Manny Sarmiento (incumbent) | United Nationalist Alliance | 51,381 | 7.83 |
| Bojie Bernardino (incumbent) | United Nationalist Alliance | 50,493 | 7.69 |
| Cloyd Casimiro (incumbent) | United Nationalist Alliance | 48,999 | 7.47 |
| Jojo Banzon | United Nationalist Alliance | 44,884 | 6.84 |
| Ces Reyes | Nationalist People's Coalition | 37,685 | 5.74 |
| Medick Ferrer | Nationalist People's Coalition | 28,740 | 4.38 |
| Eva Aguirre-Paz | Nationalist People's Coalition | 25,246 | 3.85 |
| Lea Carlos | Nationalist People's Coalition | 22,117 | 3.37 |
| Imee de Guzman | PDP–Laban | 21,119 | 3.22 |
| Mario de Leon | Nationalist People's Coalition | 20,025 | 3.05 |
| Willie Chavez | Nationalist People's Coalition | 14,720 | 2.24 |
| Kevin Abergas | Nationalist People's Coalition | 14,170 | 2.16 |
| Vic Sabiniano | Partido Pederal ng Maharlika | 12,373 | 1.89 |
| Isko Salvador | Independent | 8,740 | 1.33 |
| Noly Bernardo | Independent | 7,121 | 1.09 |
| Philip Marco | PDP–Laban | 4,826 | 0.74 |
| Total | | 656,181 | 100.00 |
| Total votes | | 99,474 | – |
| Registered voters/turnout | | 114,298 | 87.03 |
Source: Commission on Elections

==== 2nd district ====
Marikina's 2nd councilor district consists of the same area as Marikina's 2nd legislative district. Eight councilors are elected from this councilor district.

27 candidates were included in the ballot.

| Candidate | Party | Votes | % |
|---|---|---|---|
| Donn Carlo Favis (incumbent) | United Nationalist Alliance | 75,635 | 9.25 |
| Angel Nuñez (incumbent) | United Nationalist Alliance | 67,425 | 8.24 |
| Elvis Tolentino (incumbent) | United Nationalist Alliance | 65,159 | 7.97 |
| Ronnie Acuña | Liberal Party | 57,584 | 7.04 |
| Levy de Guzman (incumbent) | United Nationalist Alliance | 56,139 | 6.86 |
| Marife Dayao | United Nationalist Alliance | 54,707 | 6.69 |
| Rene Magtubo (incumbent) | Liberal Party | 52,616 | 6.43 |
| Larry Punzalan | United Nationalist Alliance | 51,937 | 6.35 |
| Randy Leal | Liberal Party | 49,096 | 6.00 |
| Joel Relleve (incumbent) | Liberal Party | 48,456 | 5.92 |
| Belinda Sto. Domingo | Liberal Party | 40,680 | 4.97 |
| Xyza Diazen | Aksyon Demokratiko | 27,611 | 3.38 |
| Akiko Lynne Centeno | Independent | 25,570 | 3.13 |
| Mark del Rosario | Aksyon Demokratiko | 24,716 | 3.02 |
| Ronald Ortiz | Nationalist People's Coalition | 19,250 | 2.35 |
| Erning Flores | Aksyon Demokratiko | 17,895 | 2.19 |
| Edwin Adigue | Nationalist People's Coalition | 16,434 | 2.01 |
| George Raymund Quimson | Nationalist People's Coalition | 15,042 | 1.84 |
| James Marshall | Independent | 14,494 | 1.77 |
| Ricky Khoo | Partido Federal ng Pilipinas | 12,389 | 1.51 |
| Jobert de Guzman | People's Reform Party | 8,007 | 0.98 |
| Elmer Se | Independent | 3,978 | 0.49 |
| Moy Balingit | Independent | 3,744 | 0.46 |
| Pedro Gler Jr. | Independent | 2,862 | 0.35 |
| Romy Bartolome | Partido Pederal ng Maharlika | 2,523 | 0.31 |
| Christian Daryl Mirabueno | Independent | 2,151 | 0.26 |
| Rocky Tica | Independent | 1,876 | 0.23 |
| Total | | 817,976 | 100.00 |
| Total votes | | 129,793 | – |
| Registered voters/turnout | | 146,451 | 88.63 |
Source: Commission on Elections

== Muntinlupa ==
=== Mayor ===
Term-limited incumbent Mayor Jaime Fresnedi of the Liberal Party ran for the House of Representatives in Muntinlupa's lone legislative district.

Fresnedi endorsed representative Ruffy Biazon (One Muntinlupa), who won the election against former Bureau of Immigration commissioner Red Mariñas (People's Reform Party) and two other candidates.

| Candidate | Party | Votes | % |
|---|---|---|---|
| Ruffy Biazon | One Muntinlupa | 180,742 | 74.26 |
| Red Mariñas | People's Reform Party | 60,434 | 24.83 |
| Nelson Benjamin | Independent | 1,153 | 0.47 |
| Oscar Marmeto | Independent | 1,069 | 0.44 |
| Total | | 243,398 | 100.00 |
| Total votes | | 252,396 | – |
| Registered voters/turnout | | 311,750 | 80.96 |
| 1Munti hold | | | |
Source: Commission on Elections

=== Vice Mayor ===
Incumbent Vice Mayor Artemio Simundac of One Muntinlupa ran for a second term. He was previously affiliated with PDP–Laban.

Simundac won re-election against Oyo Boy Dioko (People's Reform Party), son of former Muntinlupa vice mayor Celso Dioko.

| Candidate | Party | Votes | % |
|---|---|---|---|
| Artemio Simundac (incumbent) | One Muntinlupa | 131,882 | 57.48 |
| Oyo Boy Dioko | People's Reform Party | 97,567 | 42.52 |
| Total | | 229,449 | 100.00 |
| Total votes | | 252,396 | – |
| Registered voters/turnout | | 311,750 | 80.96 |
| 1Munti hold | | | |
Source: Commission on Elections

=== City Council ===
The Muntinlupa City Council is composed of 18 councilors, 16 of whom are elected.

One Muntinlupa won 16 seats, gaining a majority in the city council.

| Party | Votes | % | Seats | +/– |
|---|---|---|---|---|
| One Muntinlupa | 1,270,095 | 75.76 | 16 | New |
| People's Reform Party | 312,129 | 18.62 | 0 | New |
| Lakas–CMD | 13,085 | 0.78 | 0 | New |
| Reform Party | 8,319 | 0.50 | 0 | New |
| Independent | 72,793 | 4.34 | 0 | 0 |
| Total | 1,676,421 | 100.00 | 16 | 0 |
| Total votes | 252,396 | – | | |
| Registered voters/turnout | 311,750 | 80.96 | | |

==== 1st district ====
Muntinlupa's 1st councilor district consists of the barangays of Bayanan, Poblacion, Putatan and Tunasan. Eight councilors are elected from this councilor district.

20 candidates were included in the ballot.

| Candidate | Party | Votes | % |
|---|---|---|---|
| Raul Corro (incumbent) | One Muntinlupa | 117,497 | 11.13 |
| Alexson Diaz (incumbent) | One Muntinlupa | 113,081 | 10.72 |
| Paty Katy Boncayao (incumbent) | One Muntinlupa | 109,816 | 10.41 |
| Rachel Arciaga | One Muntinlupa | 104,727 | 9.92 |
| Ivee Arciaga (incumbent) | One Muntinlupa | 100,487 | 9.52 |
| Allan Camilon (incumbent) | One Muntinlupa | 97,556 | 9.24 |
| Jedi Presnedi | One Muntinlupa | 92,183 | 8.74 |
| Valentino Niefes (incumbent) | One Muntinlupa | 83,480 | 7.91 |
| Melchor Gaspar Teves | People's Reform Party | 57,424 | 5.44 |
| Mekong Sapitula | People's Reform Party | 41,774 | 3.96 |
| Teng Andres | People's Reform Party | 27,844 | 2.64 |
| Mark Gil Arciaga | People's Reform Party | 26,066 | 2.47 |
| Joshua Sebastian | People's Reform Party | 17,432 | 1.65 |
| Maricru Pagkalinawan | People's Reform Party | 17,005 | 1.61 |
| Lisa Macalalad | People's Reform Party | 13,245 | 1.26 |
| Bong Venturina | People's Reform Party | 11,620 | 1.10 |
| Ian dela Cruz | Reform Party | 8,319 | 0.79 |
| Shernan Roy Gaite | Independent | 7,597 | 0.72 |
| Nelvin Cerillo | Independent | 4,567 | 0.43 |
| Gervic Erum | Independent | 3,597 | 0.34 |
| Total | | 1,055,317 | 100.00 |
| Total votes | | 155,851 | – |
Source: Commission on Elections

==== 2nd district ====
Muntinlupa's 2nd councilor district consists of the barangays of Alabang, Ayala Alabang, Buli, Cupang and Sucat. Eight councilors are elected from this councilor district.

21 candidates were included in the ballot.

| Candidate | Party | Votes | % |
|---|---|---|---|
| Lester Baes (incumbent) | One Muntinlupa | 62,863 | 10.12 |
| Ryan Bagatsing (incumbent) | One Muntinlupa | 60,072 | 9.67 |
| Luvi Constantino | One Muntinlupa | 59,048 | 9.51 |
| Jun Sevilla (incumbent) | One Muntinlupa | 58,817 | 9.47 |
| Marissa Rongavilla (incumbent) | One Muntinlupa | 57,769 | 9.30 |
| Arlene Hilapo (incumbent) | One Muntinlupa | 52,309 | 8.42 |
| Eliot Martinez (incumbent) | One Muntinlupa | 51,856 | 8.35 |
| Dado Moldez | One Muntinlupa | 48,534 | 7.81 |
| Elmer Espeleta | Independent | 27,644 | 4.45 |
| Vec Ulanday | People's Reform Party | 21,787 | 3.51 |
| Allan Miranda | People's Reform Party | 19,056 | 3.07 |
| Incess Gonzaga | People's Reform Party | 14,657 | 2.36 |
| Kitchi San Pedro | People's Reform Party | 14,007 | 2.26 |
| Gonza Vasquez | Lakas–CMD | 13,085 | 2.11 |
| Wilson Lopena | People's Reform Party | 12,291 | 1.98 |
| Marlon Medina | People's Reform Party | 11,839 | 1.91 |
| Brum Gravador | Independent | 9,002 | 1.45 |
| Anthony Raymond de Leon | Independent | 8,400 | 1.35 |
| Ravi del Rosario | Independent | 6,955 | 1.12 |
| Bhebot Lizardo | People's Reform Party | 6,082 | 0.98 |
| Edgar Allan Manalo | Independent | 5,031 | 0.81 |
| Total | | 621,104 | 100.00 |
| Total votes | | 96,545 | – |
Source: Commission on Elections

== Navotas ==
=== Mayor ===
Incumbent Mayor Toby Tiangco of Partido Navoteño ran for the House of Representatives in Navotas's lone legislative district.

The Partido Navoteño nominated Tiangco's brother, representative John Rey Tiangco, who won the election against two other candidates.

| Candidate | Party | Votes | % |
|---|---|---|---|
| John Rey Tiangco | Partido Navoteño | 80,908 | 64.12 |
| RC Cruz | Aksyon Demokratiko | 44,970 | 35.64 |
| Mario Camacho | Independent | 303 | 0.24 |
| Total | | 126,181 | 100.00 |
| Total votes | | 129,907 | – |
| Registered voters/turnout | | 150,693 | 86.21 |
| Navoteño hold | | | |
Source: Commission on Elections

=== Vice Mayor ===
Term-limited Vice Mayor Clint Geronimo of Partido Navoteño ran for the Navotas City Council in the 2nd councilor district.

The Partido Navoteño nominated city councilor Tito Sanchez, who won the election against two other candidates.

| Candidate | Party | Votes | % |
|---|---|---|---|
| Tito Sanchez | Partido Navoteño | 84,065 | 72.18 |
| Icoy de Guzman | Aksyon Demokratiko | 30,948 | 26.57 |
| Fredie Maiquez | Independent | 1,453 | 1.25 |
| Total | | 116,466 | 100.00 |
| Total votes | | 129,907 | – |
| Registered voters/turnout | | 150,693 | 86.21 |
| Navoteño hold | | | |
Source: Commission on Elections

=== City Council ===
The Navotas City Council is composed of 14 councilors, 12 of whom are elected.

Partido Navoteño won 12 seats, maintaining its majority in the city council.

| Party | Votes | % | Seats | +/– |
|---|---|---|---|---|
| Partido Navoteño | 474,737 | 80.31 | 12 | 0 |
| Aksyon Demokratiko | 112,465 | 19.03 | 0 | 0 |
| Independent | 3,905 | 0.66 | 0 | 0 |
| Total | 591,107 | 100.00 | 12 | 0 |
| Total votes | 129,907 | – | | |
| Registered voters/turnout | 150,693 | 86.21 | | |

==== 1st district ====
Navotas's 1st councilor district consists of the barangays of Bagumbayan North, Bagumbayan South, Bangculasi, Navotas East, Navotas West, NBBS Dagat-dagatan, NBBS Kaunlaran, NBBS Proper, North Bay Boulevard North, San Rafael Village and Sipac Almacen. Six councilors are elected from this councilor district.

Eight candidates were included in the ballot.

| Candidate | Party | Votes | % |
|---|---|---|---|
| Rey Monroy | Partido Navoteño | 45,606 | 16.02 |
| RV Vicencio (incumbent) | Partido Navoteño | 37,753 | 13.26 |
| Lance Santiago | Partido Navoteño | 37,460 | 13.16 |
| Richard San Juan | Partido Navoteño | 36,574 | 12.85 |
| Alvin Jason Nazal (incumbent) | Partido Navoteño | 35,674 | 12.53 |
| Tarok Maño (incumbent) | Partido Navoteño | 34,910 | 12.27 |
| Lito Sulit | Aksyon Demokratiko | 30,977 | 10.88 |
| Anne Gaa | Aksyon Demokratiko | 25,674 | 9.02 |
| Total | | 284,628 | 100.00 |
| Total votes | | 64,045 | – |
Source: Commission on Elections

==== 2nd district ====
Navotas's 2nd councilor district consists of the barangays of Daanghari, San Jose, San Roque, Tangos North, Tangos South, Tanza 1 and Tanza 2. Six councilors are elected from this councilor district.

Nine candidates were included in the ballot.

| Candidate | Party | Votes | % |
|---|---|---|---|
| Migi Naval (incumbent) | Partido Navoteño | 45,748 | 14.93 |
| Clint Geronimo | Partido Navoteño | 43,821 | 14.30 |
| CJ Santos (incumbent) | Partido Navoteño | 41,990 | 13.70 |
| Neil Cruz (incumbent) | Partido Navoteño | 41,193 | 13.44 |
| Abu Gino-gino | Partido Navoteño | 38,748 | 12.64 |
| Liz Lupisan | Partido Navoteño | 35,260 | 11.50 |
| Marielle del Rosario | Aksyon Demokratiko | 34,799 | 11.35 |
| Aljohn Grutas | Aksyon Demokratiko | 21,015 | 6.86 |
| Romy Victuelles | Independent | 3,905 | 1.27 |
| Total | | 306,479 | 100.00 |
| Total votes | | 65,862 | – |
Source: Commission on Elections

== Parañaque ==
=== Mayor ===
Term-limited incumbent Mayor Edwin Olivarez of PDP–Laban ran for the House of Representatives in Parañaque's 1st legislative district.

PDP–Laban nominated his brother, representative Eric Olivarez, who won the election against Barangay Baclaran chairman Jun Zaide (Kilusang Bagong Lipunan), Drew Uy (Independent) and two other candidates.

| Candidate | Party | Votes | % |
|---|---|---|---|
| Eric Olivarez | PDP–Laban | 174,816 | 64.30 |
| Jun Zaide | Kilusang Bagong Lipunan | 64,263 | 23.64 |
| Drew Uy | Independent | 27,055 | 9.95 |
| Rolando Aguilar | Independent | 4,448 | 1.64 |
| Jherie Mores | Pederalismo ng Dugong Dakilang Samahan | 1,300 | 0.48 |
| Total | | 271,882 | 100.00 |
| Total votes | | 285,438 | – |
| Registered voters/turnout | | 346,078 | 82.48 |
| PDP–Laban hold | | | |
Source: Commission on Elections

=== Vice Mayor ===
Term-limited incumbent Vice Mayor Rico Golez of Laban ng Demokratikong Pilipino ran for the Parañaque City Council in the 2nd councilor district. He was previously affiliated with the Nationalist People's Coalition.

Golez endorsed city councilor Binky Favis of PDP–Laban, who was defeated by city councilor Joan Villafuerte of the Liberal Party. Tess de Asis (Pederalismo ng Dugong Dakilang Samahan) also ran for vice mayor.

| Candidate | Party | Votes | % |
|---|---|---|---|
| Joan Villafuerte | Liberal Party | 102,760 | 39.14 |
| Binky Favis | PDP–Laban | 89,131 | 33.95 |
| Tess de Asis | Pederalismo ng Dugong Dakilang Samahan | 70,661 | 26.91 |
| Total | | 262,552 | 100.00 |
| Total votes | | 285,438 | – |
| Registered voters/turnout | | 346,078 | 82.48 |
| Liberal gain from LDP | | | |
Source: Commission on Elections

=== City Council ===
The Parañaque City Council is composed of 18 councilors, 16 of whom are elected.

PDP–Laban won 11 seats, maintaining its majority in the city council.

| Party | Votes | % | Seats | +/– |
|---|---|---|---|---|
| PDP–Laban | 809,558 | 46.80 | 11 | –4 |
| Lakas–CMD | 139,881 | 8.09 | 1 | +1 |
| Laban ng Demokratikong Pilipino | 104,798 | 6.06 | 1 | New |
| Aksyon Demokratiko | 94,796 | 5.48 | 1 | New |
| Nationalist People's Coalition | 84,019 | 4.86 | 1 | 0 |
| PROMDI | 67,654 | 3.91 | 0 | New |
| Pederalismo ng Dugong Dakilang Samahan | 53,626 | 3.10 | 0 | 0 |
| Kilusang Bagong Lipunan | 34,410 | 1.99 | 0 | New |
| People's Reform Party | 18,363 | 1.06 | 0 | New |
| Bigkis Pinoy | 17,383 | 1.00 | 0 | New |
| Independent | 305,361 | 17.65 | 1 | +1 |
| Total | 1,729,849 | 100.00 | 16 | 0 |
| Total votes | 285,438 | – | | |
| Registered voters/turnout | 346,078 | 82.48 | | |

==== 1st district ====
Parañaque's 1st councilor district consists of the same area as Parañaque's 1st legislative district. Eight councilors are elected from this councilor district.

18 candidates were included in the ballot.

| Candidate | Party | Votes | % |
|---|---|---|---|
| Pablo Olivarez II | PDP–Laban | 76,138 | 11.02 |
| Allen Ford Tan (incumbent) | PDP–Laban | 68,286 | 9.88 |
| Pablo Gabriel Jr. (incumbent) | PDP–Laban | 67,511 | 9.77 |
| Daniel Eric Baes (incumbent) | PDP–Laban | 65,748 | 9.51 |
| Marvin Santos (incumbent) | Lakas–CMD | 64,048 | 9.27 |
| Vandolph Quizon (incumbent) | PDP–Laban | 62,437 | 9.03 |
| Brillante Inciong | Aksyon Demokratiko | 54,137 | 7.83 |
| Jomari Yllana (incumbent) | PDP–Laban | 52,265 | 7.56 |
| Paquet dela Cruz | Independent | 31,732 | 4.59 |
| Rene Velarde | PDP–Laban | 29,744 | 4.30 |
| Jaime Nery Jr. | Independent | 23,131 | 3.35 |
| Clint Calinisan | PROMDI | 20,880 | 3.02 |
| Arlene Besa | Independent | 16,881 | 2.44 |
| Sean Anthony Sanciego | Independent | 15,917 | 2.30 |
| Manny Raymundo | Independent | 10,976 | 1.59 |
| Boy Lagman | Independent | 10,534 | 1.52 |
| Mamapong Ison | Pederalismo ng Dugong Dakilang Samahan | 10,387 | 1.50 |
| Jhun Lazaro | Independent | 10,309 | 1.49 |
| Total | | 691,061 | 100.00 |
| Total votes | | 113,537 | – |
| Registered voters/turnout | | 142,815 | 79.50 |
Source: Commission on Elections

==== 2nd district ====
Parañaque's 2nd councilor district consists of the same area as Parañaque's 2nd legislative district. Eight councilors are elected from this councilor district.

27 candidates were included in the ballot.

| Candidate | Party | Votes | % |
|---|---|---|---|
| Rico Golez | Laban ng Demokratikong Pilipino | 104,798 | 10.09 |
| Nina Sotto | Nationalist People's Coalition | 84,019 | 8.09 |
| Juvantin Esplana | PDP–Laban | 75,739 | 7.29 |
| Bong Benzon (incumbent) | PDP–Laban | 75,387 | 7.26 |
| Ryan Yllana | PDP–Laban | 69,530 | 6.69 |
| Jet Frias | PDP–Laban | 62,429 | 6.01 |
| Florencia Amurao | PDP–Laban | 61,329 | 5.90 |
| Raffy dela Peña | Independent | 60,817 | 5.85 |
| Doods Antipuesto | Lakas–CMD | 54,907 | 5.29 |
| Bai Elorde | PROMDI | 46,774 | 4.50 |
| Rolando Joaquin Mendoza | PDP–Laban | 43,015 | 4.14 |
| Jaymee dela Rosa | Aksyon Demokratiko | 40,659 | 3.91 |
| Rudy Avila | Independent | 39,322 | 3.79 |
| Jerome de Asis | Pederalismo ng Dugong Dakilang Samahan | 36,077 | 3.47 |
| Maria Severina Cadano | Independent | 32,145 | 3.09 |
| Rey Casanova | Kilusang Bagong Lipunan | 29,836 | 2.87 |
| Rene Aquino | Lakas–CMD | 20,926 | 2.01 |
| JB Balicanta | People's Reform Party | 18,363 | 1.77 |
| Yolly Arandia | Bigkis Pinoy | 17,383 | 1.67 |
| Marlon Batoon | Independent | 13,346 | 1.28 |
| Anthony Vivero | Independent | 12,342 | 1.19 |
| Xin Apostol | Independent | 8,668 | 0.83 |
| Anthony Gabriel | Independent | 7,565 | 0.73 |
| Popoy Molina | Pederalismo ng Dugong Dakilang Samahan | 7,162 | 0.69 |
| Gary Hachuela | Independent | 6,473 | 0.62 |
| Pangarap Sumaribus | Independent | 5,203 | 0.50 |
| Steve Jon dela Cruz | Kilusang Bagong Lipunan | 4,574 | 0.44 |
| Total | | 1,038,788 | 100.00 |
| Total votes | | 171,901 | – |
| Registered voters/turnout | | 203,263 | 84.57 |
Source: Commission on Elections

== Pasay ==
=== Mayor ===
Incumbent Mayor Emi Rubiano of PDP–Laban ran for a second term.

Rubiano won re-election against former city councilor Richard Advincula (People's Reform Party) and two other candidates.

| Candidate | Party | Votes | % |
|---|---|---|---|
| Emi Rubiano (incumbent) | PDP–Laban | 147,661 | 70.88 |
| Richard Advincula | People's Reform Party | 30,661 | 14.72 |
| Edward Togonon | Partido para sa Demokratikong Reporma | 27,530 | 13.22 |
| AJ Romero | Independent | 2,467 | 1.18 |
| Total | | 208,319 | 100.00 |
| Total votes | | 221,411 | – |
| Registered voters/turnout | | 276,579 | 80.05 |
| PDP–Laban hold | | | |
Source: Commission on Elections

=== Vice Mayor ===
Incumbent Vice Mayor Boyet del Rosario of PDP–Laban retired.

Del Rosario endorsed his daughter, Ding del Rosario (Laban ng Demokratikong Pilipino), won the election against former city councilors Tina Bernabe-Carbajal (People's Reform Party) and Hector Bongat (Workers' and Peasants' Party), and Jessie Cruz (Independent).

| Candidate | Party | Votes | % |
|---|---|---|---|
| Ding del Rosario | Laban ng Demokratikong Pilipino | 130,138 | 69.35 |
| Tina Bernabe-Carbajal | People's Reform Party | 38,479 | 20.51 |
| Hector Bongat | Workers' and Peasants' Party | 12,336 | 6.57 |
| Jessie Cruz | Independent | 6,703 | 3.57 |
| Total | | 187,656 | 100.00 |
| Total votes | | 221,411 | – |
| Registered voters/turnout | | 276,579 | 80.05 |
| LDP gain from PDP–Laban | | | |
Source: Commission on Elections

=== City Council ===
The Pasay City Council is composed of 14 councilors, 12 of whom are elected.

PDP–Laban won 11 seats, maintaining its majority in the city council.

| Party | Votes | % | Seats | +/– |
|---|---|---|---|---|
| PDP–Laban | 673,814 | 65.35 | 11 | 0 |
| PROMDI | 106,201 | 10.30 | 0 | New |
| Pederalismo ng Dugong Dakilang Samahan | 61,933 | 6.01 | 0 | 0 |
| Workers' and Peasants' Party | 60,601 | 5.88 | 0 | New |
| Partido Federal ng Pilipinas | 47,963 | 4.65 | 1 | +1 |
| People's Reform Party | 21,112 | 2.05 | 0 | New |
| Independent | 59,491 | 5.77 | 0 | –1 |
| Total | 1,031,115 | 100.00 | 12 | 0 |
| Total votes | 221,411 | – | | |
| Registered voters/turnout | 276,579 | 80.05 | | |

==== 1st district ====
Pasay's 1st councilor district consists of Barangays 1 to 40, 68 to 92, 145 to 157, 183 and 187 to 201. Six councilors are elected from this councilor district.

18 candidates were included in the ballot.

| Candidate | Party | Votes | % |
|---|---|---|---|
| Mark Calixto (incumbent) | PDP–Laban | 71,738 | 13.71 |
| Grace Santos (incumbent) | PDP–Laban | 67,976 | 12.99 |
| Marlon Pesebre (incumbent) | PDP–Laban | 65,233 | 12.47 |
| Tonya Cuneta (incumbent) | PDP–Laban | 64,953 | 12.42 |
| Ambet Alvina (incumbent) | PDP–Laban | 55,367 | 10.58 |
| Ding Santos (incumbent) | PDP–Laban | 52,197 | 9.98 |
| Ronjay Advincula | PROMDI | 40,895 | 7.82 |
| Jhaz Advincula | Pederalismo ng Dugong Dakilang Samahan | 27,125 | 5.18 |
| Richard Anderson | Independent | 20,025 | 3.83 |
| Miki Trinidad | Pederalismo ng Dugong Dakilang Samahan | 11,002 | 2.10 |
| Eleazar Garpa | Workers' and Peasants' Party | 10,089 | 1.93 |
| Melvin Nolasco | Independent | 6,139 | 1.17 |
| Ramon Sta. Maria | Independent | 5,803 | 1.11 |
| Boni Santillana | Pederalismo ng Dugong Dakilang Samahan | 5,660 | 1.08 |
| Bossing Morallos | Pederalismo ng Dugong Dakilang Samahan | 5,162 | 0.99 |
| Allan Tancinco | Pederalismo ng Dugong Dakilang Samahan | 4,864 | 0.93 |
| Tiger Gabriel | People's Reform Party | 4,847 | 0.93 |
| Jao Bajao | Workers' and Peasants' Party | 4,105 | 0.78 |
| Total | | 523,180 | 100.00 |
| Total votes | | 111,016 | – |
| Registered voters/turnout | | 139,978 | 79.31 |
Source: Commission on Elections

==== 2nd district ====
Pasay's 2nd councilor district consists of Barangays 41 to 67, 93 to 144, 158 to 182 and 184 to 186. Six councilors are elected from this councilor district.

19 candidates were included in the ballot.

| Candidate | Party | Votes | % |
|---|---|---|---|
| Joey Isidro (incumbent) | PDP–Laban | 70,656 | 13.91 |
| Wowee Manguerra (incumbent) | PDP–Laban | 67,678 | 13.32 |
| Donna Vendivel (incumbent) | PDP–Laban | 58,414 | 11.50 |
| Jen Panaligan | PDP–Laban | 53,783 | 10.59 |
| Khen Magat | Partido Federal ng Pilipinas | 47,963 | 9.44 |
| Allo Arceo | PDP–Laban | 45,819 | 9.02 |
| Padua la Torre | PROMDI | 38,680 | 7.62 |
| Maria Czarina Lou Tolentino | Workers' and Peasants' Party | 32,429 | 6.38 |
| Noel Bayona | PROMDI | 26,626 | 5.24 |
| Jovita Baliao | Independent | 18,986 | 3.74 |
| Crio Chris Campo | Workers' and Peasants' Party | 9,077 | 1.79 |
| Botchock Batobato | People's Reform Party | 5,930 | 1.17 |
| Ferdie Espiritu | People's Reform Party | 5,612 | 1.10 |
| Sherwin Santos | Pederalismo ng Dugong Dakilang Samahan | 5,204 | 1.02 |
| Ellan Cipriano | Workers' and Peasants' Party | 4,901 | 0.96 |
| Vince Carbajal | People's Reform Party | 4,723 | 0.93 |
| Manuel Taytayon | Independent | 4,539 | 0.89 |
| Danilo Pantia | Independent | 3,999 | 0.79 |
| Loida Bernas | Pederalismo ng Dugong Dakilang Samahan | 2,916 | 0.57 |
| Total | | 507,935 | 100.00 |
| Total votes | | 110,395 | – |
| Registered voters/turnout | | 136,601 | 80.82 |
Source: Commission on Elections

== Pasig ==
=== Mayor ===
Incumbent Mayor Vico Sotto of Aksyon Demokratiko ran for a second term.

Sotto won re-election against Pasig vice mayor Iyo Caruncho Bernardo (People's Reform Party).

| Candidate | Party | Votes | % |
|---|---|---|---|
| Vico Sotto (incumbent) | Aksyon Demokratiko | 335,851 | 88.04 |
| Iyo Caruncho Bernardo | People's Reform Party | 45,604 | 11.96 |
| Total | | 381,455 | 100.00 |
| Total votes | | 389,419 | – |
| Registered voters/turnout | | 457,370 | 85.14 |
| Aksyon hold | | | |
Source: Commission on Elections

=== Vice Mayor ===
Term-limited incumbent Vice Mayor Iyo Caruncho Bernardo of the People's Reform Party ran for mayor of Pasig. He was previously affiliated with PDP–Laban.

Bernardo endorsed former city councilor Christian Sia (Partido Pilipino sa Pagbabago), who was defeated by former representative Robert Jaworski Jr. of Aksyon Demokratiko. City councilor Junjun Concepcion (Pederalismo ng Dugong Dakilang Samahan) also ran for vice mayor.

| Candidate | Party | Votes | % |
|---|---|---|---|
| Robert Jaworski Jr. | Aksyon Demokratiko | 205,250 | 55.62 |
| Junjun Concepcion | Pederalismo ng Dugong Dakilang Samahan | 87,716 | 23.77 |
| Christian Sia | Partido Pilipino sa Pagbabago | 76,028 | 20.60 |
| Total | | 368,994 | 100.00 |
| Total votes | | 389,419 | – |
| Registered voters/turnout | | 457,370 | 85.14 |
| Aksyon gain from PRP | | | |
Source: Commission on Elections

=== City Council ===
The Pasig City Council is composed of 14 councilors, 12 of whom are elected.

The Nationalist People's Coalition won eight seats, gaining a majority in the city council.

| Party | Votes | % | Seats | +/– |
|---|---|---|---|---|
| Nationalist People's Coalition | 612,131 | 32.73 | 8 | New |
| Aksyon Demokratiko | 269,790 | 14.42 | 2 | New |
| Nacionalista Party | 207,471 | 11.09 | 1 | –9 |
| People's Reform Party | 100,482 | 5.37 | 0 | New |
| PROMDI | 99,322 | 5.31 | 0 | New |
| PDP–Laban | 90,029 | 4.81 | 0 | 0 |
| Pederalismo ng Dugong Dakilang Samahan | 77,982 | 4.17 | 1 | New |
| Workers' and Peasants' Party | 42,188 | 2.26 | 0 | New |
| Kilusang Bagong Lipunan | 27,896 | 1.49 | 0 | New |
| Samahang Kaagapay ng Agilang Pilipino | 14,183 | 0.76 | 0 | New |
| Independent | 328,984 | 17.59 | 0 | –2 |
| Total | 1,870,458 | 100.00 | 12 | 0 |
| Total votes | 389,419 | – | | |
| Registered voters/turnout | 457,370 | 85.14 | | |

==== 1st district ====
Pasig's 1st councilor district is composed of the barangays of Bagong Ilog, Bagong Katipunan, Bambang, Buting, Caniogan, Kalawaan, Kapasigan, Kapitolyo, Malinao, Oranbo, Palatiw, Pineda, Sagad, San Antonio, San Joaquin, San Jose, San Nicolas, Santa Rosa, Santo Tomas, Sumilang and Ugong. Six councilors are elected from this councilor district.

22 candidates were included in the ballot.

| Candidate | Party | Votes | % |
|---|---|---|---|
| Kiko Rustia | Nationalist People's Coalition | 80,136 | 10.66 |
| Simon Romulo Tantoco | Nationalist People's Coalition | 74,384 | 9.90 |
| Pao Santiago | Nationalist People's Coalition | 61,789 | 8.22 |
| Volta delos Santos | Nationalist People's Coalition | 51,745 | 6.88 |
| Eric Gonzales | Nationalist People's Coalition | 50,316 | 6.69 |
| Reggie Balderrama (incumbent) | Pederalismo ng Dugong Dakilang Samahan | 49,297 | 6.56 |
| Jana de Leon | PROMDI | 49,029 | 6.52 |
| Dottie Brown | Independent | 48,054 | 6.39 |
| Paul Senogat | Aksyon Demokratiko | 36,890 | 4.91 |
| Bobot Guevarra | People's Reform Party | 28,169 | 3.75 |
| Ron Angeles | Independent | 27,654 | 3.68 |
| Angelica Angeles | Independent | 26,835 | 3.57 |
| Migs Caruncho Trinidad | PDP–Laban | 26,781 | 3.56 |
| Jess Gaviola | Nacionalista Party | 25,906 | 3.45 |
| Raymundo Legaspi | Independent | 20,396 | 2.71 |
| Rene Lipana | Nacionalista Party | 19,849 | 2.64 |
| Tantan Ambrosio Reyes | Independent | 17,697 | 2.35 |
| Andy Cheng | PDP–Laban | 16,270 | 2.16 |
| Benjie Javier | Independent | 15,666 | 2.08 |
| Rey de Jesus | Samahang Kaagapay ng Agilang Pilipino | 14,183 | 1.89 |
| Gary Sta. Ana | PDP–Laban | 6,394 | 0.85 |
| Ram Alan Cruz | PROMDI | 4,285 | 0.57 |
| Total | | 751,725 | 100.00 |
| Total votes | | 155,143 | – |
| Registered voters/turnout | | 182,129 | 85.18 |
Source: Commission on Elections

==== 2nd district ====
Pasig's 2nd councilor district is composed of the barangays of Dela Paz, Manggahan, Maybunga, Pinagbuhatan, Rosario, San Miguel, Santa Lucia and Santolan. Six councilors are elected from this councilor district.

16 candidates were included in the ballot.

| Candidate | Party | Votes | % |
|---|---|---|---|
| Angelu de Leon | Aksyon Demokratiko | 138,427 | 12.37 |
| Corie Raymundo (incumbent) | Nationalist People's Coalition | 120,977 | 10.81 |
| Syvel Asilo (incumbent) | Nacionalista Party | 99,159 | 8.86 |
| Buboy Agustin | Nationalist People's Coalition | 97,218 | 8.69 |
| Quin Cruz | Aksyon Demokratiko | 94,473 | 8.44 |
| Maro Martires | Nationalist People's Coalition | 75,566 | 6.75 |
| Apple Benito | People's Reform Party | 72,313 | 6.46 |
| Steve de Asis | Nacionalista Party | 62,557 | 5.59 |
| Warren Inocencio | Independent | 51,717 | 4.62 |
| Kaye dela Cruz | PROMDI | 46,008 | 4.11 |
| Robin Salandanan | Independent | 45,286 | 4.05 |
| Ryan Enriquez | PDP–Laban | 40,584 | 3.63 |
| Charmie Benavides | Pederalismo ng Dugong Dakilang Samahan | 28,685 | 2.56 |
| Jay Eusebio | Workers' and Peasants' Party | 27,127 | 2.42 |
| Bobby Hapin | Independent | 16,980 | 1.52 |
| Mike Romualdez | Kilusang Bagong Lipunan | 16,264 | 1.45 |
| Isidro Mariano | Independent | 15,165 | 1.36 |
| Grace Sta. Ana | Workers' and Peasants' Party | 15,061 | 1.35 |
| Jeff Pastor | Kilusang Bagong Lipunan | 11,632 | 1.04 |
| Alan Sy | Independent | 9,248 | 0.83 |
| Dodoy Pasamante | Independent | 7,469 | 0.67 |
| Rani Banzil | Independent | 6,008 | 0.54 |
| Pablo Cantoria | Independent | 5,568 | 0.50 |
| Cesar Pelayo Jr. | Independent | 4,641 | 0.41 |
| Brando Hernandez | Independent | 4,453 | 0.40 |
| Eduardo Manaois | Independent | 3,297 | 0.29 |
| Bert Vidayo | Independent | 2,850 | 0.25 |
| Total | | 1,118,733 | 100.00 |
| Total votes | | 234,276 | – |
| Registered voters/turnout | | 275,241 | 85.12 |
Source: Commission on Elections

== Pateros ==
=== Mayor ===
Incumbent Mayor Ike Ponce of Aksyon Demokratiko ran for a third term. He was previously affiliated with PDP–Laban.

Ponce won re-election against Marilyn Chiong (Independent).

| Candidate | Party | Votes | % |
|---|---|---|---|
| Ike Ponce (incumbent) | Aksyon Demokratiko | 28,534 | 91.13 |
| Marilyn Chiong | Independent | 2,777 | 8.87 |
| Total | | 31,311 | 100.00 |
| Total votes | | 33,248 | – |
| Registered voters/turnout | | 39,273 | 84.66 |
| Aksyon hold | | | |
Source: Commission on Elections

=== Vice Mayor ===
Incumbent Vice Mayor Gerald German of PDP–Laban is term-limited.

German endorsed Barangay Magtanggol captain John Peter Marzan of Aksyon Demokratiko, who was defeated by Pateros Liga ng mga Barangay president Carlo Santos of the Nacionalista Party.

| Candidate | Party | Votes | % |
|---|---|---|---|
| Carlo Santos | Nacionalista Party | 16,856 | 54.23 |
| John Peter Marzan | Aksyon Demokratiko | 14,227 | 45.77 |
| Total | | 31,083 | 100.00 |
| Total votes | | 33,248 | – |
| Registered voters/turnout | | 39,273 | 84.66 |
| Nacionalista gain from PDP–Laban | | | |
Source: Commission on Elections

=== Municipal Council ===
The Pateros Municipal Council is composed of 14 councilors, 12 of whom are elected.

Aksyon Demokratiko won six seats, becoming the largest party in the municipal council.

| Party | Votes | % | Seats | +/– |
|---|---|---|---|---|
| Aksyon Demokratiko | 68,962 | 42.45 | 6 | New |
| Nacionalista Party | 59,831 | 36.83 | 4 | +1 |
| Partido Pilipino sa Pagbabago | 13,537 | 8.33 | 2 | New |
| Partido Federal ng Pilipinas | 4,473 | 2.75 | 0 | New |
| Partido Demokratiko Sosyalista ng Pilipinas | 832 | 0.51 | 0 | New |
| Independent | 14,826 | 9.13 | 0 | 0 |
| Total | 162,461 | 100.00 | 12 | 0 |
| Total votes | 33,248 | – | | |
| Registered voters/turnout | 39,273 | 84.66 | | |

==== 1st district ====
Pateros' 1st councilor district consists of the barangays of Martires del 96, San Roque and Santa Ana. Six councilors are elected from this councilor district.

17 candidates were included in the ballot.

| Candidate | Party | Votes | % |
|---|---|---|---|
| Allan dela Cruz | Aksyon Demokratiko | 9,488 | 10.24 |
| Hapon Abiño (incumbent) | Aksyon Demokratiko | 8,119 | 8.76 |
| Jay Mabanglo | Partido Pilipino sa Pagbabago | 7,865 | 8.49 |
| Napoleon Dionisio Jr. (incumbent) | Aksyon Demokratiko | 7,208 | 7.78 |
| Ador Rosales (incumbent) | Aksyon Demokratiko | 6,590 | 7.11 |
| Mil Villegas | Nacionalista Party | 6,581 | 7.10 |
| Jojo Nicdao (incumbent) | Aksyon Demokratiko | 6,552 | 7.07 |
| Monay Manzon | Nacionalista Party | 6,533 | 7.05 |
| Cesar Llagas | Aksyon Demokratiko | 5,463 | 5.90 |
| Eric Mabazza | Nacionalista Party | 5,268 | 5.69 |
| Nene Bermejo | Nacionalista Party | 4,750 | 5.13 |
| Jonjon Ongmanchi | Partido Federal ng Pilipinas | 4,473 | 4.83 |
| Lando Dolon | Nacionalista Party | 4,257 | 4.60 |
| Jose Percival Capco Jr. | Independent | 3,838 | 4.14 |
| Doy dela Cruz | Independent | 2,853 | 3.08 |
| Moner Luna | Nacionalista Party | 1,560 | 1.68 |
| Aldy Reyes | Independent | 1,235 | 1.33 |
| Total | | 92,633 | 100.00 |
| Total votes | | 18,942 | – |
Source: Commission on Elections

==== 2nd district ====
Pateros' 2nd councilor district consists of the barangays of Aguho, Magtanggol, Poblacion, San Pedro, Santo Rosario-Kanluran, Santo Rosario-Silangan and Tabacalera. Six councilors are elected from this councilor district.

16 candidates were included in the ballot.

| Candidate | Party | Votes | % |
|---|---|---|---|
| Bojic Raymundo (incumbent) | Aksyon Demokratiko | 7,225 | 10.35 |
| RSM Miranda | Nacionalista Party | 6,733 | 9.64 |
| Jeric Reyes (incumbent) | Nacionalista Party | 6,305 | 9.03 |
| Alden Mangoba (incumbent) | Nacionalista Party | 6,192 | 8.87 |
| Ayie Ampe | Aksyon Demokratiko | 5,691 | 8.15 |
| Joven Gatpayat (incumbent) | Partido Pilipino sa Pagbabago | 5,672 | 8.12 |
| Ernesto Cortez (incumbent) | Aksyon Demokratiko | 5,270 | 7.55 |
| Marvin Sanchez | Nacionalista Party | 5,089 | 7.29 |
| Rommel Lambino | Independent | 4,808 | 6.89 |
| Jun Ling | Aksyon Demokratiko | 3,870 | 5.54 |
| Ajowell Raymundo | Nacionalista Party | 3,668 | 5.25 |
| Ramon Roxas | Aksyon Demokratiko | 3,486 | 4.99 |
| Totoy Maravilla | Nacionalista Party | 2,895 | 4.15 |
| Sonny Santos | Independent | 1,704 | 2.44 |
| Bernardeth Pastrana | Partido Demokratiko Sosyalista ng Pilipinas | 832 | 1.19 |
| Ian Gutierrez | Independent | 388 | 0.56 |
| Total | | 69,828 | 100.00 |
| Total votes | | 14,306 | – |
Source: Commission on Elections

== Quezon City ==
=== Mayor ===
Incumbent Mayor Joy Belmonte of the Serbisyo sa Bayan Party ran for a second term.

Belmonte won re-election against Anakalusugan representative Mike Defensor (Partido Federal ng Pilipinas) and seven other candidates.

| Candidate | Party | Votes | % |
|---|---|---|---|
| Joy Belmonte (incumbent) | Serbisyo sa Bayan Party | 662,611 | 60.43 |
| Mike Defensor | Partido Federal ng Pilipinas | 419,064 | 38.22 |
| Glenda Araneta | Independent | 4,282 | 0.39 |
| Diosdado Velasco | Independent | 2,981 | 0.27 |
| Ric Bello | Partido Demokratiko Sosyalista ng Pilipinas | 2,642 | 0.24 |
| Emma Orozco | Independent | 1,899 | 0.17 |
| Jose Ingles | Workers' and Peasants' Party | 1,238 | 0.11 |
| Tom Salutan | Independent | 975 | 0.09 |
| Rolando Jota | Independent | 853 | 0.08 |
| Total | | 1,096,545 | 100.00 |
| Total votes | | 1,138,511 | – |
| Registered voters/turnout | | 1,403,895 | 81.10 |
| SBP hold | | | |
Source: Commission on Elections

=== Vice Mayor ===
Incumbent Vice Mayor Gian Sotto of the Serbisyo sa Bayan Party ran for a second term.

Sotto won re-election against councilor Winnie Castelo (Lakas–CMD) and two other candidates.

| Candidate | Party | Votes | % |
|---|---|---|---|
| Gian Sotto (incumbent) | Serbisyo sa Bayan Party | 594,170 | 56.51 |
| Winnie Castelo | Lakas–CMD | 436,212 | 41.48 |
| Christine Laraño | Independent | 14,679 | 1.40 |
| Helen Rodriguez | Partido Demokratiko Sosyalista ng Pilipinas | 6,451 | 0.61 |
| Total | | 1,051,512 | 100.00 |
| Total votes | | 1,138,511 | – |
| Registered voters/turnout | | 1,403,895 | 81.10 |
| SBP hold | | | |
Source: Commission on Elections

=== City Council ===
The Quezon City Council is composed of 38 councilors, 36 of whom are elected.

The Serbisyo sa Bayan Party won 25 seats, maintaining its majority in the city council.

| Party | Votes | % | Seats | +/– |
|---|---|---|---|---|
| Serbisyo sa Bayan Party | 2,976,936 | 54.18 | 25 | –8 |
| Lakas–CMD | 1,256,632 | 22.87 | 5 | New |
| Nacionalista Party | 216,405 | 3.94 | 3 | +2 |
| PDP–Laban | 183,957 | 3.35 | 1 | 0 |
| Aksyon Demokratiko | 154,061 | 2.80 | 0 | New |
| Filipino Rights Protection Advocates of Manila Movement | 70,758 | 1.29 | 1 | New |
| Nationalist People's Coalition | 70,051 | 1.27 | 1 | +1 |
| Partido Pilipino sa Pagbabago | 59,839 | 1.09 | 0 | New |
| Partido para sa Demokratikong Reporma | 52,140 | 0.95 | 0 | New |
| Partido Demokratiko Sosyalista ng Pilipinas | 44,769 | 0.81 | 0 | New |
| Reform Party | 34,138 | 0.62 | 0 | New |
| Pwersa ng Masang Pilipino | 11,003 | 0.20 | 0 | 0 |
| Partido Federal ng Pilipinas | 10,816 | 0.20 | 0 | New |
| Malayang Quezon City | 7,870 | 0.14 | 0 | New |
| Katipunan ng Nagkakaisang Pilipino | 6,544 | 0.12 | 0 | New |
| Maharlika People's Party | 5,251 | 0.10 | 0 | New |
| Kilusang Bagong Lipunan | 5,181 | 0.09 | 0 | New |
| People's Reform Party | 1,606 | 0.03 | 0 | New |
| Independent | 326,278 | 5.94 | 0 | 0 |
| Total | 5,494,235 | 100.00 | 36 | – |
| Total votes | 1,138,511 | – | | |
| Registered voters/turnout | 1,403,895 | 81.10 | | |

==== 1st district ====
Quezon City's 1st councilor district consists of the same area as Quezon City's 1st legislative district. Six councilors are elected from this councilor district.

16 candidates were included in the ballot.

| Candidate | Party | Votes | % |
|---|---|---|---|
| Bernard Herrera (incumbent) | Serbisyo sa Bayan Party | 120,831 | 14.59 |
| TJ Calalay (incumbent) | Serbisyo sa Bayan Party | 117,952 | 14.24 |
| Doray Delarmente (incumbent) | Serbisyo sa Bayan Party | 116,018 | 14.01 |
| Sep Juico | Serbisyo sa Bayan Party | 103,377 | 12.48 |
| Nikki Crisologo (incumbent) | Lakas–CMD | 93,920 | 11.34 |
| Charm Ferrer | Serbisyo sa Bayan Party | 91,364 | 11.03 |
| Doland Castro | Aksyon Demokratiko | 57,596 | 6.95 |
| John Nieto | Lakas–CMD | 22,126 | 2.67 |
| Jun de Leon | Lakas–CMD | 19,339 | 2.33 |
| Drid de Castro | Lakas–CMD | 18,892 | 2.28 |
| Bong Vinzons | Lakas–CMD | 17,643 | 2.13 |
| Loleng Carandang | Lakas–CMD | 17,344 | 2.09 |
| Emil Padilla | Independent | 11,530 | 1.39 |
| Benjamin Aromin Jr. | Independent | 8,615 | 1.04 |
| Charles Cahilig | Katipunan ng Nagkakaisang Pilipino | 6,544 | 0.79 |
| Lamheto Tebio | Maharlika People's Party | 5,251 | 0.63 |
| Total | | 828,342 | 100.00 |
| Total votes | | 174,235 | – |
| Registered voters/turnout | | 224,351 | 77.66 |
Source: Commission on Elections

==== 2nd district ====
Quezon City's 2nd councilor district consists of the same area as Quezon City's 2nd legislative district. Six councilors are elected from this councilor district.

16 candidates were included in the ballot.

| Candidate | Party | Votes | % |
|---|---|---|---|
| Mikey Belmonte (incumbent) | Serbisyo sa Bayan Party | 150,770 | 12.04 |
| Candy Medina (incumbent) | Serbisyo sa Bayan Party | 149,913 | 11.98 |
| Aly Medalla | Serbisyo sa Bayan Party | 124,834 | 9.97 |
| Dave Valmocina | Serbisyo sa Bayan Party | 120,808 | 9.65 |
| Rannie Ludovica | Serbisyo sa Bayan Party | 109,741 | 8.77 |
| Godie Liban | Serbisyo sa Bayan Party | 105,980 | 8.47 |
| Roderick Paulate | Lakas–CMD | 70,445 | 5.63 |
| Martin Henri Leachon | Lakas–CMD | 61,429 | 4.91 |
| Kurt Castelo Nocum | Lakas–CMD | 60,108 | 4.80 |
| Wenky dela Rosa | Partido Pilipino sa Pagbabago | 59,839 | 4.78 |
| Jing Liban | Lakas–CMD | 52,214 | 4.17 |
| Winsell Beltran | Lakas–CMD | 38,431 | 3.07 |
| Victor Pring | Independent | 36,676 | 2.93 |
| Joseph Cerezo | Independent | 20,006 | 1.60 |
| Melissa Mendez | Aksyon Demokratiko | 15,335 | 1.23 |
| Charlie Mangune | Partido Demokratiko Sosyalista ng Pilipinas | 12,450 | 0.99 |
| Emerita Pecson | Partido Federal ng Pilipinas | 10,816 | 0.86 |
| Beth Vargas | Partido Demokratiko Sosyalista ng Pilipinas | 8,962 | 0.72 |
| Leo Mendoza | Independent | 8,264 | 0.66 |
| Eddie Garcia | Independent | 7,350 | 0.59 |
| Norberto Rivero | Independent | 6,713 | 0.54 |
| Franz Resty Perez | Independent | 6,002 | 0.48 |
| Mario Rillo | Partido Demokratiko Sosyalista ng Pilipinas | 4,934 | 0.39 |
| Kevin Joseph Villaruz | Partido Demokratiko Sosyalista ng Pilipinas | 3,655 | 0.29 |
| Jimmy Penepona | Partido Demokratiko Sosyalista ng Pilipinas | 2,317 | 0.19 |
| Don Hombre | Kilusang Bagong Lipunan | 2,207 | 0.18 |
| Miguel Jotojot | People's Reform Party | 1,606 | 0.13 |
| Total | | 1,251,805 | 100.00 |
| Total votes | | 255,263 | – |
| Registered voters/turnout | | 309,300 | 82.53 |
Source: Commission on Elections

==== 3rd district ====
Quezon City's 3rd councilor district consists of the same area as Quezon City's 3rd legislative district. Six councilors are elected from this councilor district.

19 candidates were included in the ballot.

| Candidate | Party | Votes | % |
|---|---|---|---|
| Kate Coseteng (incumbent) | Serbisyo sa Bayan Party | 79,613 | 12.17 |
| Geleen Lumbad | Filipino Rights Protection Advocates of Manila Movement | 70,758 | 10.82 |
| Chuckie Antonio | Serbisyo sa Bayan Party | 68,083 | 10.41 |
| Don de Leon | Nacionalista Party | 62,120 | 9.50 |
| Wency Lagumbay (incumbent) | Nacionalista Party | 58,664 | 8.97 |
| Anton Reyes | Nationalist People's Coalition | 57,590 | 8.80 |
| Jorge Banal (incumbent) | Serbisyo sa Bayan Party | 49,416 | 7.55 |
| Christopher Allan Liquigan | Lakas–CMD | 43,036 | 6.58 |
| Robert Neil Pacheco | Serbisyo sa Bayan Party | 40,663 | 6.22 |
| John Defensor (incumbent) | Lakas–CMD | 37,111 | 5.67 |
| Supremo dela Fuente | PDP–Laban | 36,933 | 5.65 |
| Dante de Guzman | Aksyon Demokratiko | 17,307 | 2.65 |
| Allan Franza | Nationalist People's Coalition | 12,461 | 1.90 |
| Jimmy Borres | PDP–Laban | 8,351 | 1.28 |
| Shaun Terence Ng | Independent | 3,154 | 0.48 |
| Vincent Papa | Independent | 3,068 | 0.47 |
| Resurreccion Manuel | Independent | 3,000 | 0.46 |
| Kiko de Mesa | Partido Demokratiko Sosyalista ng Pilipinas | 1,855 | 0.28 |
| Jeffrey Cea | Malayang Quezon City | 988 | 0.15 |
| Total | | 654,171 | 100.00 |
| Total votes | | 135,482 | – |
| Registered voters/turnout | | 161,366 | 83.96 |
Source: Commission on Elections

==== 4th district ====
Quezon City's 4th councilor district consists of the same area as Quezon City's 4th legislative district. Six councilors are elected from this councilor district.

19 candidates were included in the ballot.

| Candidate | Party | Votes | % |
|---|---|---|---|
| Egay Yap | Serbisyo sa Bayan Party | 89,424 | 10.48 |
| Imee Rillo (incumbent) | Lakas–CMD | 86,514 | 10.14 |
| Raquel Malañgen | Lakas–CMD | 85,604 | 10.03 |
| Irene Belmonte (incumbent) | Serbisyo sa Bayan Party | 82,167 | 9.63 |
| Nanette Daza | Lakas–CMD | 80,793 | 9.47 |
| Marra Suntay (incumbent) | Serbisyo sa Bayan Party | 79,029 | 9.26 |
| Ivy Lagman (incumbent) | Serbisyo sa Bayan Party | 77,907 | 9.13 |
| Bobby Andrews | Lakas–CMD | 69,612 | 8.16 |
| Ariel Inton | Independent | 69,495 | 8.14 |
| Babes Malaya | Serbisyo sa Bayan Party | 48,821 | 5.72 |
| Hero Bautista (incumbent) | Serbisyo sa Bayan Party | 48,790 | 5.72 |
| Eric Chan | Independent | 8,563 | 1.00 |
| Nestor Andal | Independent | 6,972 | 0.82 |
| Joshua Cleofe | Independent | 4,947 | 0.58 |
| James Ibañez | Aksyon Demokratiko | 4,654 | 0.55 |
| Yans Macadaeg | Independent | 3,490 | 0.41 |
| Awin Aquino | Partido Demokratiko Sosyalista ng Pilipinas | 2,747 | 0.32 |
| Allan Parreño | Reform Party | 2,710 | 0.32 |
| Edward Guingab | Malayang Quezon City | 1,286 | 0.15 |
| Total | | 853,525 | 100.00 |
| Total votes | | 176,961 | – |
| Registered voters/turnout | | 210,720 | 83.98 |
Source: Commission on Elections

==== 5th district ====
Quezon City's 5th councilor district consists of the same area as Quezon City's 5th legislative district. Six councilors are elected from this councilor district.

18 candidates were included in the ballot.

| Candidate | Party | Votes | % |
|---|---|---|---|
| Joseph Visaya | Serbisyo sa Bayan Party | 141,586 | 13.33 |
| Alfred Vargas | PDP–Laban | 138,673 | 13.06 |
| Ram Medalla (incumbent) | Serbisyo sa Bayan Party | 109,068 | 10.27 |
| Shay Liban (incumbent) | Serbisyo sa Bayan Party | 97,678 | 9.20 |
| Aiko Melendez | Nacionalista Party | 95,621 | 9.01 |
| Mutya Castelo | Lakas–CMD | 90,746 | 8.55 |
| Jonel Quebal | Serbisyo sa Bayan Party | 85,691 | 8.07 |
| Freddy Roxas | Serbisyo sa Bayan Party | 82,357 | 7.76 |
| Maureen Botones | Partido para sa Demokratikong Reporma | 52,140 | 4.91 |
| Apple Francisco | Aksyon Demokratiko | 47,766 | 4.50 |
| Toleng Francisco | Lakas–CMD | 30,067 | 2.83 |
| Ace Jurado | Lakas–CMD | 23,518 | 2.21 |
| Bobby Papin | Lakas–CMD | 22,189 | 2.09 |
| Emil Austriaco | Lakas–CMD | 14,235 | 1.34 |
| Gani Oro | Aksyon Demokratiko | 11,403 | 1.07 |
| Walter Alvin Zamora | Independent | 10,161 | 0.96 |
| EJ delos Reyes | Independent | 5,224 | 0.49 |
| Mark Vincent Schwab | Independent | 3,722 | 0.35 |
| Total | | 1,061,845 | 100.00 |
| Total votes | | 219,369 | – |
| Registered voters/turnout | | 264,130 | 83.05 |
Source: Commission on Elections

==== 6th district ====
Quezon City's 6th councilor district consists of the same area as Quezon City's 6th legislative district. Six councilors are elected from this councilor district.

25 candidates were included in the ballot.

| Candidate | Party | Votes | % |
|---|---|---|---|
| Ellie Juan | Serbisyo sa Bayan Party | 92,149 | 10.91 |
| Kristine Alexia Matias | Serbisyo sa Bayan Party | 90,271 | 10.69 |
| Eric Medina (incumbent) | Serbisyo sa Bayan Party | 84,683 | 10.03 |
| Banjo Pilar | Serbisyo sa Bayan Party | 75,668 | 8.96 |
| Vito Sotto Generoso | Serbisyo sa Bayan Party | 73,646 | 8.72 |
| Victor Bernardo | Serbisyo sa Bayan Party | 68,638 | 8.13 |
| Jem Castelo | Lakas–CMD | 49,099 | 5.81 |
| Rikki Mathay | Lakas–CMD | 44,866 | 5.31 |
| Cheche de Jesus | Independent | 43,940 | 5.20 |
| Ali Forbes | Lakas–CMD | 34,682 | 4.11 |
| Alvin Constantino | Reform Party | 31,428 | 3.72 |
| Louie Saludes | Lakas–CMD | 31,127 | 3.69 |
| Jaja Mantele | Lakas–CMD | 23,367 | 2.77 |
| Carmela Suva | Independent | 23,424 | 2.77 |
| Boy Matias | Independent | 19,951 | 2.36 |
| Karl John Paguio | Lakas–CMD | 18,175 | 2.15 |
| Drew Liban | Pwersa ng Masang Pilipino | 11,003 | 1.30 |
| Nilo Apo | Malayang Quezon City | 5,596 | 0.66 |
| Dinkydoo Clarion | Independent | 4,646 | 0.55 |
| Allah Arceo | Independent | 3,987 | 0.47 |
| Leo Maturan | Independent | 3,378 | 0.40 |
| Junipher Sumadia | Kilusang Bagong Lipunan | 2,974 | 0.35 |
| Peter Cruz | Partido Demokratiko Sosyalista ng Pilipinas | 2,795 | 0.33 |
| Carol Maneged | Partido Demokratiko Sosyalista ng Pilipinas | 2,749 | 0.33 |
| MJ Vallena | Partido Demokratiko Sosyalista ng Pilipinas | 2,305 | 0.27 |
| Total | | 844,547 | 100.00 |
| Total votes | | 177,201 | – |
| Registered voters/turnout | | 234,028 | 75.72 |
Source: Commission on Elections

== San Juan ==
=== Mayor ===
Incumbent Mayor Francis Zamora of PDP–Laban ran for a second term.

Zamora won re-election against Jun Usman (Pwersa ng Masang Pilipino).

| Candidate | Party | Votes | % |
|---|---|---|---|
| Francis Zamora (incumbent) | PDP–Laban | 66,883 | 87.66 |
| Jun Usman | Pwersa ng Masang Pilipino | 9,413 | 12.34 |
| Total | | 76,296 | 100.00 |
| Total votes | | 81,104 | – |
| Registered voters/turnout | | 109,640 | 73.97 |
| PDP–Laban hold | | | |
Source: Commission on Elections

=== Vice Mayor ===
Incumbent Vice Mayor Warren Villa of PDP–Laban ran for a second term.

Villa won re-election against former San Juan vice mayor Philip Cezar (Pwersa ng Masang Pilipino).

| Candidate | Party | Votes | % |
|---|---|---|---|
| Warren Villa (incumbent) | PDP–Laban | 55,920 | 77.10 |
| Philip Cezar | Pwersa ng Masang Pilipino | 16,608 | 22.90 |
| Total | | 72,528 | 100.00 |
| Total votes | | 81,104 | – |
| Registered voters/turnout | | 109,640 | 73.97 |
| PDP–Laban hold | | | |
Source: Commission on Elections,

=== City Council ===
The San Juan City Council is composed of 14 councilors, 12 of whom are elected.

PDP–Laban won 12 seats, gaining a majority in the city council.

| Party | Votes | % | Seats | +/– |
|---|---|---|---|---|
| PDP–Laban | 268,840 | 67.34 | 12 | +9 |
| Pwersa ng Masang Pilipino | 114,934 | 28.79 | 0 | –9 |
| Lakas–CMD | 3,634 | 0.91 | 0 | New |
| Independent | 11,797 | 2.96 | 0 | New |
| Total | 399,205 | 100.00 | 12 | 0 |
| Total votes | 81,104 | – | | |
| Registered voters/turnout | 109,640 | 73.97 | | |

==== 1st district ====
San Juan's 1st councilor district consists of the barangays of Balong-Bato, Batis, Corazon de Jesus, Ermitaño, Pasadeña, Pedro Cruz, Progreso, Rivera, Salapan and San Perfecto. Six councilors are elected from this councilor district.

13 candidates were included in the ballot.

| Candidate | Party | Votes | % |
|---|---|---|---|
| Angelo Agcaoili | PDP–Laban | 25,912 | 13.38 |
| Paul Artadi (incumbent) | PDP–Laban | 23,247 | 12.01 |
| Raissa Laurel-Subijano (incumbent) | PDP–Laban | 23,174 | 11.97 |
| James Yap | PDP–Laban | 21,427 | 11.07 |
| Ervic Vijandre | PDP–Laban | 18,016 | 9.30 |
| Ryan Llanos Dee | PDP–Laban | 17,666 | 9.12 |
| Vic Reyes (incumbent) | Pwersa ng Masang Pilipino | 14,479 | 7.48 |
| Triccia Dacer | Independent | 11,797 | 6.09 |
| Chesco Velasco (incumbent) | Pwersa ng Masang Pilipino | 11,285 | 5.83 |
| William Go | Pwersa ng Masang Pilipino | 9,802 | 5.06 |
| Dante Santiago | Pwersa ng Masang Pilipino | 9,488 | 4.90 |
| Mari Goitia | Pwersa ng Masang Pilipino | 3,892 | 2.01 |
| Lou Fiedalan | Pwersa ng Masang Pilipino | 3,438 | 1.78 |
| Total | | 193,623 | 100.00 |
| Total votes | | 39,021 | – |
Source: Commission on Elections,

==== 2nd district ====
San Juan's 2nd councilor district consists of the barangays of Addition Hills, Greenhills, Isabelita, Kabayanan, Litte Baguio, Maytunas, Onse, Saint Joseph, Santa Lucia, Tibagan and West Crame. Six councilors are elected from this councilor district.

13 candidates were included in the ballot.

| Candidate | Party | Votes | % |
|---|---|---|---|
| Franco Tañada-Yam | PDP–Laban | 25,367 | 12.34 |
| Kit Peralta (incumbent) | PDP–Laban | 24,749 | 12.04 |
| Macky Mathay | PDP–Laban | 23,346 | 11.36 |
| Bea de Guzman (incumbent) | PDP–Laban | 23,336 | 11.35 |
| Totoy Bernardo (incumbent) | PDP–Laban | 22,331 | 10.86 |
| Don Allado | PDP–Laban | 20,269 | 9.86 |
| Mary Joy Ibuna-Leoy (incumbent) | Pwersa ng Masang Pilipino | 15,193 | 7.39 |
| Boy Celles | Pwersa ng Masang Pilipino | 12,857 | 6.25 |
| Inday Garutay Borja | Pwersa ng Masang Pilipino | 12,559 | 6.11 |
| Candy Crisologo | Pwersa ng Masang Pilipino | 8,117 | 3.95 |
| Sophia Rebullida | Pwersa ng Masang Pilipino | 7,202 | 3.50 |
| Walter Pangilinan | Pwersa ng Masang Pilipino | 6,622 | 3.22 |
| Bong Belgica | Lakas–CMD | 3,634 | 1.77 |
| Total | | 205,582 | 100.00 |
| Total votes | | 42,083 | – |
Source: Commission on Elections,

== Taguig ==
=== Mayor ===
Incumbent Mayor Lino Cayetano of the Nacionalista Party retired.

The Nacionalista Party nominated representative Lani Cayetano, who won the election against former representative Arnel Cerafica (Partido Pilipino sa Pagbabago).

| Candidate | Party | Votes | % |
|---|---|---|---|
| Lani Cayetano | Nacionalista Party | 272,876 | 75.77 |
| Arnel Cerafica | Partido Pilipino sa Pagbabago | 87,266 | 24.23 |
| Total | | 360,142 | 100.00 |
| Total votes | | 371,575 | – |
| Registered voters/turnout | | 449,359 | 82.69 |
| Nacionalista hold | | | |
Source: Commission on Elections

=== Vice Mayor ===
Term-limited incumbent Vice Mayor Ading Cruz of the Nacionalista Party ran for the House of Representatives in Taguig–Pateros's lone legislative district.

The Nacionalista Party nominated city councilor Arvin Alit, who won the election against former representative Arnel Cerafica's wife, Janelle Cerafica (Partido Pilipino sa Pagbabago).

| Candidate | Party | Votes | % |
|---|---|---|---|
| Arvin Alit | Nacionalista Party | 232,034 | 68.81 |
| Janelle Cerafica | Partido Pilipino sa Pagbabago | 105,157 | 31.19 |
| Total | | 337,191 | 100.00 |
| Total votes | | 371,575 | – |
| Registered voters/turnout | | 449,359 | 82.69 |
| Nacionalista hold | | | |
Source: Commission on Elections

=== City Council ===
The Taguig City Council is composed of 18 councilors, 16 of whom are elected.

The Nacionalista Party won 16 seats, maintaining its majority in the city council.

| Party | Votes | % | Seats | +/– |
|---|---|---|---|---|
| Nacionalista Party | 1,617,292 | 69.03 | 16 | 0 |
| Partido Pilipino sa Pagbabago | 608,912 | 25.99 | 0 | New |
| Partido Lakas ng Masa | 14,368 | 0.61 | 0 | New |
| Partido Pederal ng Maharlika | 13,502 | 0.58 | 0 | New |
| Independent | 88,929 | 3.80 | 0 | 0 |
| Total | 2,343,003 | 100.00 | 16 | 0 |
| Total votes | 371,575 | – | | |
| Registered voters/turnout | 449,359 | 82.69 | | |

==== 1st district ====
Taguig's 1st councilor district consists of the barangays of Taguig in Taguig–Pateros's lone legislative district. Eight councilors are elected from this councilor district.

19 candidates were included in the ballot.

| Candidate | Party | Votes | % |
|---|---|---|---|
| Jimmy Labampa (incumbent) | Nacionalista Party | 105,771 | 9.66 |
| Gigi de Mesa (incumbent) | Nacionalista Party | 105,617 | 9.65 |
| Tikboy Marcelino | Nacionalista Party | 96,695 | 8.83 |
| Joy Panga-Cruz | Nacionalista Party | 94,514 | 8.63 |
| Gamie San Pedro | Nacionalista Party | 94,111 | 8.60 |
| Carlito Ogalinola | Nacionalista Party | 93,044 | 8.50 |
| Raul Aquino | Nacionalista Party | 85,159 | 7.78 |
| Totong Mañosca | Nacionalista Party | 83,719 | 7.65 |
| Anggus Icay | Partido Pilipino sa Pagbabago | 50,475 | 4.61 |
| Warren Dionisio | Partido Pilipino sa Pagbabago | 41,554 | 3.80 |
| Jannah Cruz | Partido Pilipino sa Pagbabago | 38,925 | 3.56 |
| Warren delos Santos | Partido Pilipino sa Pagbabago | 35,586 | 3.25 |
| Ronet Franco | Partido Pilipino sa Pagbabago | 35,560 | 3.25 |
| Jonjon Bautista | Partido Pilipino sa Pagbabago | 33,826 | 3.09 |
| RJ Bernal | Partido Pilipino sa Pagbabago | 27,270 | 2.49 |
| Paul Lontoc | Independent | 24,923 | 2.28 |
| Elvira Madrid | Partido Pilipino sa Pagbabago | 24,620 | 2.25 |
| Mar Norbert Osorio | Independent | 12,696 | 1.16 |
| Inocentes Amoroso | Independent | 10,681 | 0.98 |
| Total | | 1,094,746 | 100.00 |
| Total votes | | 170,044 | – |
Source: Commission on Elections

==== 2nd district ====
Taguig's 2nd councilor district consists of the same area as Taguig's lone legislative district. Eight councilors are elected from this councilor district.

21 candidates were included in the ballot.

| Candidate | Party | Votes | % |
|---|---|---|---|
| Nicky Supan | Nacionalista Party | 124,188 | 9.95 |
| Jaime Garcia (incumbent) | Nacionalista Party | 115,437 | 9.25 |
| Marisse Balina-Eron (incumbent) | Nacionalista Party | 113,376 | 9.08 |
| Yasser Pangandaman (incumbent) | Nacionalista Party | 110,370 | 8.84 |
| Jomil Serna | Nacionalista Party | 100,883 | 8.08 |
| Ed Prado | Nacionalista Party | 99,564 | 7.98 |
| Edgar Baptista | Nacionalista Party | 98,315 | 7.88 |
| Alex Penolio | Nacionalista Party | 96,529 | 7.73 |
| Myla Valencia | Partido Pilipino sa Pagbabago | 55,633 | 4.46 |
| Larry German | Partido Pilipino sa Pagbabago | 41,735 | 3.34 |
| Jay Morales | Partido Pilipino sa Pagbabago | 41,468 | 3.32 |
| Oscar Dio | Partido Pilipino sa Pagbabago | 38,467 | 3.08 |
| Jun Rivera | Partido Pilipino sa Pagbabago | 37,078 | 2.97 |
| Glenn Sacay | Partido Pilipino sa Pagbabago | 36,651 | 2.94 |
| Basilio Pooten | Partido Pilipino sa Pagbabago | 36,433 | 2.92 |
| Art Flores | Partido Pilipino sa Pagbabago | 33,631 | 2.69 |
| Toroy Francisco | Independent | 15,142 | 1.21 |
| Darius Lim | Independent | 14,522 | 1.16 |
| Felomino Balmes | Partido Lakas ng Masa | 14,368 | 1.15 |
| Milly Somera | Partido Pederal ng Maharlika | 13,502 | 1.08 |
| Caleb Tibio | Independent | 10,965 | 0.88 |
| Total | | 1,248,257 | 100.00 |
| Total votes | | 201,531 | – |
Source: Commission on Elections

== Valenzuela ==
=== Mayor ===
Term-limited incumbent Mayor Rex Gatchalian of the Nationalist People's Coalition (NPC) ran for the House of Representatives in Valenzuela's 1st legislative district.

The NPC nominated representative Wes Gatchalian, who won the election against Bombit Bernardo (Lingkod ng Mamamayan ng Valenzuela City).

| Candidate | Party | Votes | % |
|---|---|---|---|
| Wes Gatchalian | Nationalist People's Coalition | 275,650 | 78.61 |
| Bombit Bernardo | Lingkod ng Mamamayan ng Valenzuela City | 75,026 | 21.39 |
| Total | | 350,676 | 100.00 |
| Total votes | | 363,995 | – |
| Registered voters/turnout | | 443,611 | 82.05 |
| NPC hold | | | |
Source: Commission on Elections

=== Vice Mayor ===
Incumbent Vice Mayor Lorie Natividad-Borja of the Nationalist People's Coalition ran for a third term.

Natividad-Borja won re-election against Barangay Karuhatan captain Ricardo de Gula (Lingkod ng Mamamayan ng Valenzuela City).

| Candidate | Party | Votes | % |
|---|---|---|---|
| Lorie Natividad-Borja (incumbent) | Nationalist People's Coalition | 257,613 | 77.68 |
| Ricardo de Gula | Lingkod ng Mamamayan ng Valenzuela City | 74,020 | 22.32 |
| Total | | 331,633 | 100.00 |
| Total votes | | 363,995 | – |
| Registered voters/turnout | | 443,611 | 82.05 |
| NPC hold | | | |
Source: Commission on Elections

=== City Council ===
The Valenzuela City Council is composed of 14 councilors, 12 of whom are elected.

The Nationalist People's Coalition won 10 seats, maintaining its majority in the city council.

| Party | Votes | % | Seats | +/– |
|---|---|---|---|---|
| Nationalist People's Coalition | 1,112,648 | 63.68 | 10 | –1 |
| Lingkod ng Mamamayan ng Valenzuela City | 369,774 | 21.16 | 0 | New |
| Lakas–CMD | 108,765 | 6.23 | 1 | New |
| Partido Federal ng Pilipinas | 97,989 | 5.61 | 1 | New |
| Independent | 58,014 | 3.32 | 0 | New |
| Total | 1,747,190 | 100.00 | 12 | 0 |
| Total votes | 363,995 | – | | |
| Registered voters/turnout | 443,611 | 82.05 | | |

==== 1st district ====
Valenzuela's 1st councilor district consists of the same area as Valenzuela's 1st legislative district. Six councilors are elected from this councilor district.

13 candidates were included in the ballot.

| Candidate | Party | Votes | % |
|---|---|---|---|
| Marlon Alejandrino | Nationalist People's Coalition | 110,391 | 13.91 |
| Ramon Encarnacion (incumbent) | Nationalist People's Coalition | 109,999 | 13.86 |
| Ricar Enriquez (incumbent) | Lakas–CMD | 108,765 | 13.70 |
| Cris Feliciano | Partido Federal ng Pilipinas | 97,989 | 12.34 |
| Ghogo Lee (incumbent) | Nationalist People's Coalition | 89,881 | 11.32 |
| Bimbo dela Cruz (incumbent) | Nationalist People's Coalition | 82,732 | 10.42 |
| Abet Mariano | Independent | 49,599 | 6.25 |
| Nico Trinidad | Lingkod ng Mamamayan ng Valenzuela City | 34,874 | 4.39 |
| Ernie Tolentino | Lingkod ng Mamamayan ng Valenzuela City | 33,417 | 4.21 |
| Waldo Estrella | Lingkod ng Mamamayan ng Valenzuela City | 20,725 | 2.61 |
| Weng Lopez | Lingkod ng Mamamayan ng Valenzuela City | 19,685 | 2.48 |
| Rodelio Lucero | Lingkod ng Mamamayan ng Valenzuela City | 18,836 | 2.37 |
| Ariel Dillena | Lingkod ng Mamamayan ng Valenzuela City | 16,983 | 2.14 |
| Total | | 793,876 | 100.00 |
| Total votes | | 170,741 | – |
| Registered voters/turnout | | 199,294 | 85.67 |
Source: Commission on Elections

==== 2nd district ====
Valenzuela's 2nd councilor district consists of the same area as Valenzuela's 2nd legislative district. Six councilors are elected from this councilor district.

11 candidates were included in the ballot.

| Candidate | Party | Votes | % |
|---|---|---|---|
| Gerald Galang | Nationalist People's Coalition | 129,817 | 13.62 |
| Niña Lopez (incumbent) | Nationalist People's Coalition | 121,113 | 12.70 |
| Sel Sabino-Sy | Nationalist People's Coalition | 119,614 | 12.55 |
| Louie Nolasco (incumbent) | Nationalist People's Coalition | 118,363 | 12.42 |
| Mickey Pineda | Nationalist People's Coalition | 115,831 | 12.15 |
| Chiqui Carreon (incumbent) | Nationalist People's Coalition | 114,907 | 12.05 |
| Rizalino Ferrer | Lingkod ng Mamamayan ng Valenzuela City | 45,475 | 4.77 |
| Jason de Gula | Lingkod ng Mamamayan ng Valenzuela City | 45,230 | 4.74 |
| Shiela Gamuyod | Lingkod ng Mamamayan ng Valenzuela City | 38,323 | 4.02 |
| Gertrudes Morales-Acuna | Lingkod ng Mamamayan ng Valenzuela City | 36,489 | 3.83 |
| Ferdie Urrutia | Lingkod ng Mamamayan ng Valenzuela City | 25,457 | 2.67 |
| Nida Cainap | Lingkod ng Mamamayan ng Valenzuela City | 21,767 | 2.28 |
| Gilbert Gamas | Independent | 12,513 | 1.31 |
| Danilo Cueto | Independent | 8,415 | 0.88 |
| Total | | 953,314 | 100.00 |
| Total votes | | 193,254 | – |
| Registered voters/turnout | | 244,317 | 79.10 |
Source: Commission on Elections
