= Roces =

Roces is a surname. Notable people with the surname include:

- Alejandro Roces (1924–2011), Filipino author, essayist, dramatist
- Ana Roces (born 1976), Filipino actress
- China Roces (born 1990), Filipina actress, model, and radio personality
- Chino Roces (1913–1988), Filipino businessman and newspaper publisher
- Edgardo Roces (born 1949), Filipino businessman
- Lucrecia Roces Kasilag (1918–2008), Filipino composer and pianist
- Marian Pastor Roces, Filipina art critic and curator
- Rafael R. Roces Jr. (1912–1944), Filipino journalist
- Rosanna Roces (born 1972), Filipino actress and comedian
- Sue Roces (born 1985), Filipino volleyball player
- Susan Roces (1941–2022), Filipino actress
