= Ang Misyon: A Marawi Siege Story =

- Directed by: Ceasar Soriano
- Starring: Martin Escudero; Rez Cortez; Lou Veloso; Jordan Castillo; Tanya Gomez; Darius Razon; China Roces; Juan Miguel Soriano
- Production companies: GreatCzar Media Productions, Star Cinema
- Distributed by: Sine Screen
- Release date: May 30, 2018 (Philippines)
- Country: Philippines

Ang Misyon: A Marawi Siege Story (transl. The Mission: A Marawi Siege Story) is a 2018 Filipino war drama film directed by Ceasar Soriano. In the film, Sajid Tumawil, a Muslim nurse and a terrorist sympathizer, was discovered by the military to be a member of the extremist group. The film was released in the Philippines on May 30, 2018, and it received mixed reviews from the critics, citing its poor narrative and acting.

== Cast ==
- Martin Escudero
- Rez Cortez
- Lou Veloso
- Jordan Castillo
- Tanya Gomez
- Darius Razon
- China Roces
- Juan Miguel Soriano
- Jack Falcis
- Bong Russo
- Ceasar Soriano
- Al Flores
- John Michael Wagnon
- Mia Mendiola
- Chamberlaine Uy
