= Lou Veloso =

Filipino actor-politician

The Honorable Lou Veloso
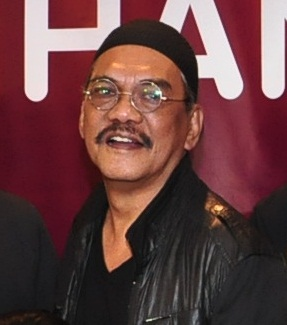
- Veloso in December 2016

Member of the Manila City Council from 6th District
- Incumbent
- Assumed office June 30, 2019
- In office June 30, 2007 – June 30, 2013
- In office June 30, 1995 – June 30, 2004

Personal details
- Born: Luciano Mariñas Veloso; January 7, 1948 (age 78) Pasay, Rizal, Philippines
- Party: Aksyon Demokratiko (2007–2009; 2021–present)
- Other political affiliations: Asenso Manileño (2021–2024); PMP (2018–2021); KKK (2012–2013); Liberal (1998–2004; 2009–2018); LDP (2004–2007); PDP–Laban (2004); PRP (1995–1998)
- Occupation: Actor; comedian; politician

Luciano "Lou" Mariñas Veloso (born January 7, 1948) is a Filipino actor, comedian, director and politician. He is known for his supporting roles in over 30 comedy films, which include Mga Kwento ni Lola Basyang (1985), Suwapings (1994), Ang Cute ng Ina Mo (2007), and Desperadas 2 (2008). As an actor, Veloso has also performed in films such as Kabayo Kids, released in 1990, in which he portrayed Loreiga, Buddy en Sol (Sine Ito!) (1992), and M & M: The Incredible Twins (1989).

== Entertainment career ==
Veloso's first film was Working Girls under Viva Films in 1984 in which he played a security guard in a bank office. Veloso was also a TV host of AgriSiyete, which he replaced original host the late comedian Bert Marcelo in 1996. He also appeared in a various educational programs are Batibot and K-High which he plays as a grandfather.

In 1994, Veloso was cast in a lead role opposite Noel Trinidad in film critic Emmanuel A. Reyes' comedy film Suwapings.

== Senakulo stage play ==
He is also the founder and musical stage play director of Martir sa Golgota, a senakulo or passion play, launched in 1979 which was traditionally held every Holy Week of every year in Manila.

== Political career ==
Veloso was elected councilor of the 6th district of Manila from 1995 to 2004 and from 2007 until 2013. He ran for a congressional seat in the 2004, but lost to Benny Abante.

He then ran for vice mayor on the 2013 midterm elections as a Liberal with Mayor Alfredo Lim but lost to incumbent Vice Mayor Isko Moreno. He ran in 2016 for councilor under KABAKA but lost, placing eighth.

He successfully returned to the city council in 2019, running under the Team Legacy ticket of PMP led by Mayor Joseph Estrada. He was re-elected in 2022 and 2025, he is the longest-serving city councilor of Manila for eight terms.

He was notably the author of a resolution in 1996 seeking the renovation of the Manila City Hall's Clock Tower. The renovation only started years later, until it was completed and inaugurated as the Manila Clock Tower Museum in 2022.

== Filmography ==
=== Film ===
Year	Title	Role
1984	Working Girls	Security guard
1985	Mga Kwento ni Lola Basyang	
1987	Binibining Tsuperman	Ipe
1988	Wake Up Little Susie	Atty. Perfecto Holmado
1988	Hamunin ang Bukas...	
1988	Bakit Kinagat ni Adan ang Mansanas ni Eba?	Snake
1989	M & M: The Incredible Twins	
1990	Kabayo Kids	
1991	Katabi Ko'y Mamaw	Restaurant manager
1991	Juan Tamad at Mister Shooli: Mongolian Barbecue	Kulas
1993	Gagay: Prinsesa ng Brownout	Roderick
1993	Pulis Patola	
1994	Suwapings	Mayor Como
1995	Run Barbi Run	Mr. Gloria
1995	Closer to Home	Nanding
2001	Greaseman	the Greaseman
2003	A.B. Normal College: Todo Na 'Yan! Kulang Pa 'Yun!	Carlos
2003	Woman of Breakwater	Igme
2003	Crying Ladies	Barangay chairman
2005	The Masseur	Client F
2006	Gee-Gee at Waterina	
2006	Heremias	Mang Teban
2007	Ang Cute ng Ina Mo	Don Emong Goloid
2008	Desperadas 2	Ugly doctor
2009	Colorum	Pedro Trinidad
2009	Ang Tanging Pamilya (A Marry-Go-Round!)	Sunshine's father
2011	Wedding Tayo, Wedding Hindi	Kanoy Garbanzos
2012	The Bourne Legacy	The fisherman
2012	El Presidente	Julián Felipe
2012	Shake, Rattle and Roll Fourteen: The Invasion	Katiwala
2012	Kamera Obskura	
2012	Requieme!	
2013	Thalia Melpomene	
2014	Bonifacio: Ang Unang Pangulo	Tatang
2014	Shake, Rattle & Roll XV	Badjo
2015	Kid Kulafu	Mang Polding
2015	Da Dog Show	Sergio
2015	Pipo	Photographer
2015	Trap	Renato
2016	Hiblang Abo	Huse
2016	Die Beautiful	Flora
2016	Seklusyon	Mang Sandoval
2016	Shiniuma (Dead Horse)	
2016	I America	
2017	Ang Guro Kong 'Di Marunong Magbasa	
2017	Woke Up Like This	Begger/App Junior
2017	Tatlong Bibe	Tino
2018	Manila Is Full of Men Named Boy	
2018	Citizen Jake	
2018	Ang Misyon: A Marawi Siege Story	
2018	Kontradiksyon	
2018	Harry & Patty	Mang Sincero
2019	General Commander	
2019	Banal	Manong Cielo
2019	Watch List	Hector
2019	Mina-Anud	Mario
2019	Damaso	Pilosopo Tasyo
2019	3pol Trobol: Huli Ka Balbon!	Ka Tinio
2020	D'Ninang	Lolo Medy
2020	Suarez: The Healing Priest	
2021	Katips	Temyong
2021	A Hard Day	Eduardo
2021	Bekis on the Run	Nanay Pacing
2021	Death of Nintendo	Mang Pido
2021	Versus	Baby's attorney
2021	Tenement 66	Old Man Nando
2022	Broken Blooms	
2023	Ang Matsing at ang Pagong	Tatay Rudy
2023	Balik Taya	Tito Gani
2023	Ang Mga Halang	
2025	Lola Barang	

=== Television ===
Year	Title	Character/Role
1985–1989	Student Canteen	Host
1985–1994	Batibot	Himself
1985–1996	Lovingly Yours	Himself
1989–1990	Boracay	Various
1990	Mongolian Barbecue	Guest
1994–1996	Sine Skwela	Various
1996–1998	Agri Siyete	Host
1999–2001	Ispup	
1999	Back to Iskul Bukol	
1999	Beh Bote Nga	
2001	Daddy Di Do Du	
2002	Magpakailanman	Various
2003	Math-Tinik	Himself
2005	Kakabakaboo	Various
2005	Maynila	Various
2005	Bubble Gang Jr.	Various
2005	Noel	Various
2006	Calla Lily	Father Theo
2007	Camera Café	Various
2007	Daisy Siete	Various
2007	Maging Sino Ka Man Ang Pagbabalik	Various
2009–2010	May Bukas Pa	
2009–2010	Pepeng Agimat	Tata Endo
2010	Pepito Manaloto	Various
2010	Noah	Tatang Zatok
2010	K-High	Lolo
2010	Pidol's Wonderland	Various
2010	Maalaala Mo Kaya	Choreographer
2011	Mula sa Puso	Taxi Passenger
2012	Wako Wako	Chief Satano
2012	Luv U	Various
2012	Toda Max	Uncle Magpainitan
2013	Got to Believe	During Pantoja
2014	Mars Ravelo's Dyesebel	Apoika
2014	Home Sweetie Home	Joselito Romulo
2015	Kano Luvs Pinay	Various
2015	Pangako sa 'Yo	Sous Chef Tony
2016	Saq Al-bambu (The Bamboo Stalk)	Grandpa Mendoza
2016	Dear Uge	
2016	Magpakailanman: The Happy and Sad Adventures of Tekla: The Romeo Librada Story	Lolo
2016	Tsuperhero	Taong Grasa
2016–2017	FPJ's Ang Probinsyano	Miyong
2017	Destined to be Yours	Elvis
2017	Trops	Uge
2017	Alyas Robin Hood	Tanglaw
2017–2018	Tadhana	Tatay Doy/Gusting
2018	Bagani	Pirate Guy
2018	Dear Uge	Principal Teodoro
2019	Kadenang Ginto	Waldo
2019	Parasite Island	Andong
2019	One of the Baes	Ed Casikip
2020	Bella Bandida	Siken
2021	Hoy, Love You!	Bruno
2022–2023	Maria Clara at Ibarra	Prof. Jose R. Torres
2023–2024	FPJ's Batang Quiapo	Ricardo "Noy" Panganiban Jr.†

== Theatre ==
Year	Title	Role	Notes	Ref
1982	Taong Grasa (Grease Man)		Palanca award-winning One-Act and One Actor Play – A Monologue about a homeless man in the throes of hunger by Dr Anton Juan	
2005	Gee-gee at Waterina		Presented at the Cultural Center of the Philippines' Virgin Labfest	
2009	Mga Gerilya sa Powell Street		Tanghalang Pilipino production of an original play adapted by Palanca Award-winning playwright Rody Vera from the novel of the same title by Benjamin Pimentel Jr.	
2009	Tanyag		a production of Palanca Award-winning plays about contemporary Philippine society such as Our Lady of Arlegui by Chris Martinez (First Prize, 2007) J. Dennis Teodosio's Baka Sakali (Second Prize, 2007) and Ang Kalungkutan ng mga Reyna by Floy Quintos (First Prize, 2008)	
2009	Cory	as one of the narrators	A restaging of original Filipino musical “Cory” at the Armed Forces of the Philippines (AFP) Theater in Manila	
2012	Walang Kukurap	Papang	Tanghalang Pilipino suspense thriller play that tackles graft and corruption	
2012	Walang Sugat	Tadeo	Tanghalang Pilipino production of an original zarzuela with a libretto written by Severino Reyes in 1898 and music by Fulgencio Tolentino	
2012	Stageshow	Beggar	Tanghalang Pilipino production written by Mario O’Hara as a tribute vaudeville and stage show artists	
2013	Der Kaufmann		Tanghalang Pilipino production of the retelling of William Shakespeare's comedy "The Merchant of Venice"	
2013	Katy!		A Spotlights Artists Centre production with music by Ryan Cayabyab and lyrics by Jose Javier Reyes, directed by Nestor U. Torre	
2013	Pramoedya	one of Pramoedya’s rival writers	Benjamin Pimentel's two-act drama, inspired by the life and times of Indonesia’s Pramoedya Ananta Toer presented at Cultural Center of the Philippines' Virgin Labfest	
2013	Martir sa Golgota	Director of the play	a senakulo play based on the life and passion of Jesus Christ staged by The Manila Mobile Theater Foundation (Tanghalang Sta. Ana) at the Cultural Center of the Philippines’ Tanghalang Aurelio Tolentino (Little Theater)	
2014	Taong Grasa (Grease Man)		restaging by MusicArtes Inc.	

== Awards ==
Year	Award giving body	Award	Work	Results	Ref
2009	5th Cinemalaya Philippine Independent Film Festival	Best Actor	Colorum	Won	
2009	36th Brussels International Film Festival	Best Actor	Colorum	Won	
2010	33rd Gawad Urian	Best Actor	Colorum	Won	
2010	1st MTRCB Awards	Best Actor	Colorum	Won	
2010	26th PMPC Star Awards for Movies	Best Actor	Colorum	Nominated	
2010	7th ENPRESS Golden Screen Awards	Best Actor	Colorum	Nominated	
2010	58th Filipino Academy of Movie Arts and Sciences Awards	Lou Salvador Sr. Memorial Award		Won	
2013	6th Gawad Buhay Awards	Male Featured Performance in a Play	Der Kaufmann	Nominated	
2015	QCinema Film Festival Awards 2015	Best Supporting Actor	Water Lemon	Won	
2015	Young Critics Circle	Best Performer	Da Dog Show	Won	
2016	12th Cinemalaya Philippine Independent Film Festival	Best Supporting Actor	Hiblang Abo	Won	
2016	39th Gawad Urian	Best Actor	Da Dog Show	Nominated	
2016	39th Gawad Urian	Best Supporting Actor	Taklub	Nominated	
2019	42nd Gawad Urian	Best Supporting Actor	Citizen Jake	Nominated	
2019	6th Urduja Heritage Film Festival Awards	Best Actor	Kawangis	Won	
