= Benjamin Pimentel Jr. =

Benjamin "Boying" Pimentel Jr. is a Filipino-American journalist and author known for his coverage of Silicon Valley issues and for his literary works on Philippine social issues and history. His best known work, "U.G.: An Underground Tale" which is a biography of filipino activist Edgar Jopson, was adapted into a 2026 biopic by Jade Castro and director Katski Flores.

Pimentel grew up in Quezon City and took up a Bachelor's degree at the University of the Philippines Diliman, where he wrote for the Philippine Collegian. Upon graduation he briefly wrote for Midweek Magazine, where he worked under writers like Pete Lacaba and Greg Brillantes. He then moved to the US to study at the UC Berkeley Graduate School of Journalism, after which he became a long-time reporter for the San Francisco Chronicle.

In 1994, Pimentel was awarded the Golden Gate Award at the San Francisco International Film Festival for "Toxic Sunset," a critical investigative documentary he had written about the environmental damages caused by the various United States bases in the Philippines. In 2001, Filipinas Magazine awarded Pimentel with their Achievement Award for Communications in recognition of his journalism career with the San Francisco Chronicle up to that point.

== See also ==
- Susan Quimpo
- Criselda Yabes
- Pete Lacaba
