= China Roces =

Filipina actress, model, and radio personality

- Born: Geraldine Catalan; January 12, 1990 (age 36); Makati, Philippines
- Education: University of Makati
- Occupations: Actress, singer, comedian, dancer, gravure idol
- Years active: 2012–present
- Agent: Viva Artist Agency (2012–present)
- Children: 3
- Website: China Roces on Facebook

Geraldine Catalan-Santos (born January 12, 1990), known professionally as China Roces, is a Filipina actress, model, and radio personality. She is known as the co-host for Jojo Alejar's late night show The Medyo Late Night Show with Jojo A. and with Mr. Fu on Wow Mali. She is also an occasional anchor for Brigada News FM.

== Personal life ==
Her screen name China Roces is derived from Chino Roces Avenue, a road that traverses Makati City, Metro Manila, where she hails from. It is revealed in her vlog dated February 7, 2021, that she has a 14-year old daughter named Lymhie. She also had a son named Timothy with ex-partner Tim Sawyer.

== Career ==
Roces started her career as a co-host for Jojo Alejar on The Medyo Late Night Show with Jojo A., when the show started airing on GMA in January 2014. She appeared for FHM Philippines' 100% Hottie section for June 2014, in which she became a favorite like Tricia Santos and Ann B. Mateo. A month after, her name was tapped on alleged sex video with News5 anchor/reporter Paolo Bediones, as she denied she is the girl on that video, and Bediones said that the video was in 2009 and its impossible that Roces was 17 years old at that time. She reappeared again in the September 2014 issue of FHM Magazine with returning Diana Zubiri as cover girl, Chito Miranda and Senator Antonio Trillanes IV. In Dudutan 2014 Roces won in the Bikini Open contest. In 2015, she frequently guest on different mass-based radio station like Barangay LS 97.1 and 93.9 iFM. In the 2015 FHM 100 Sexiest list was end into controversy, Roces along with Tricia Santos (which allegedly led boycott with Andrea Torres, according to Pep.ph) and even Marian Rivera and Cristine Reyes are not included on the list, however she still appear for the 2 part FHM Event at the SMX Convention Center which she represent the Tanduay Rhum with Lhea Bernardino and Kookai Sarmiento, however they revealed as Ranked No. 65 which labeled Ina Raymundo which eventually pose for November issue of FHM.

== Filmography ==
| Year | Title | Role |
|---|---|---|
| 2012 | The Medyo Late Night Show with Jojo A. | Co-Host |
| 2013–2015 | Wow Mali | Co-Host |
| 2014 | Be Careful with My Heart | Maid |
| 2015 | The Ryzza Mae Show | Guest |
| 2015 | Tunay Na Buhay | Guest |
| 2015 | ASAP | Guest |
| 2015 | Eat Bulaga | Bulaga Pa More! contestant |
| 2015 | All of Me | |
