= 2022 Manila local elections =

19th Mayoral election in the City of Manila

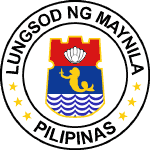
- May 9, 2022
- Turnout: 78.21% ▲9.1 pp
- Mayoral election
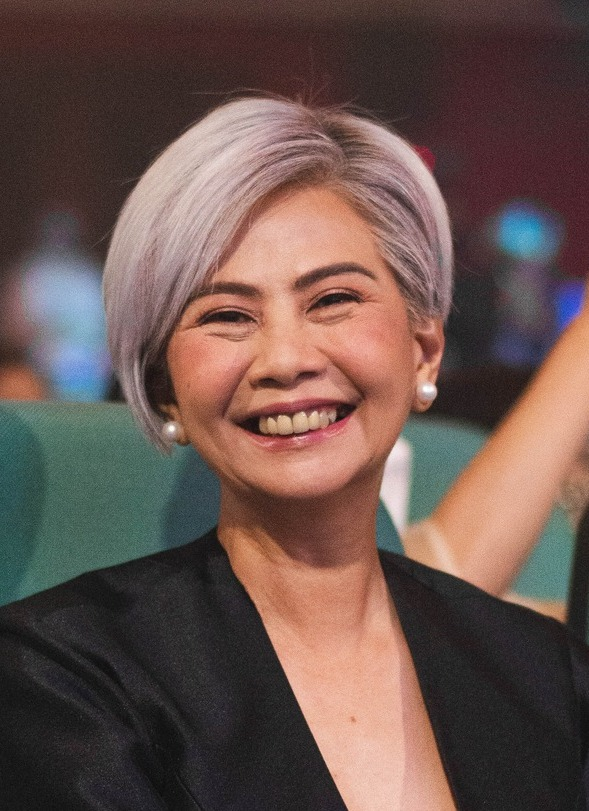

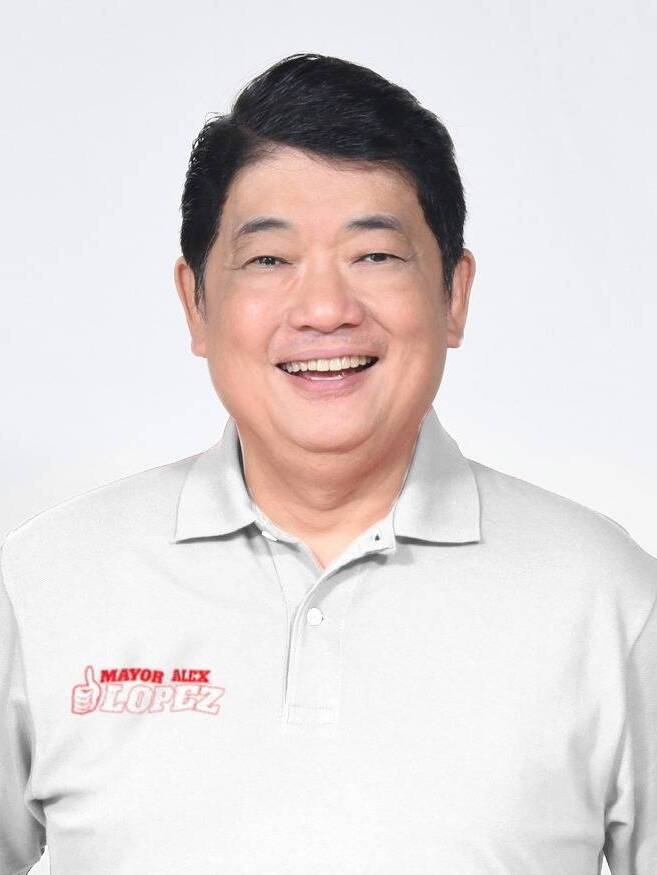

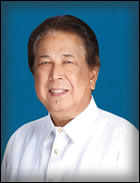
Candidate	Honey Lacuna	Alex Lopez	Amado Bagatsing
Party	Asenso Manileño	PFP	KABAKA
Alliance	Honey-Yul	UniTeam Manila	Team Amado
Running mate	Yul Servo	Raymond Bagatsing	—
Popular vote	538,595	166,908	118,694
Percentage	63.68%	19.74%	14.03%
- A map showing the results of the Manila mayoral election by barangay
Mayor before election
Isko Moreno
Asenso Manileño
Elected mayor
Honey Lacuna
Asenso Manileño
- Vice mayoral election
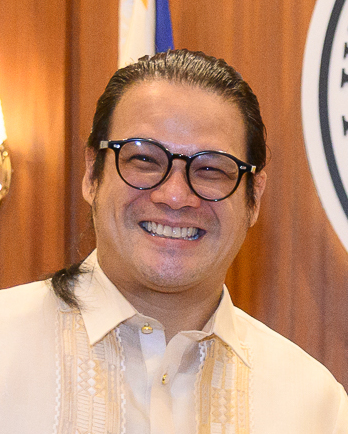

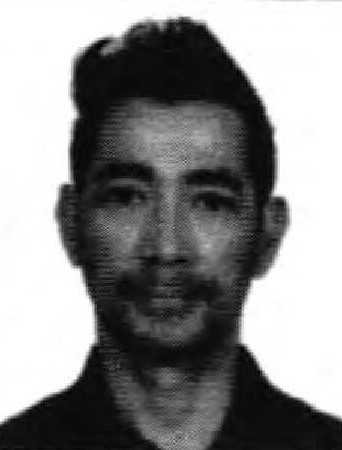

Candidate	Yul Servo	Raymond Bagatsing
Party	Asenso Manileño	KBL
Alliance	Honey-Yul	UniTeam Manila
Popular vote	586,855	185,431
Percentage	73.67%	23.28%
- A map showing the results of the Manila vice mayoral election by barangay
Vice Mayor before election
Honey Lacuna
Asenso Manileño
Elected Vice Mayor
Yul Servo
Asenso Manileño
- City Council election

36 of 38 seats in the Manila City Council 20 seats needed for a majority
	First party	Second party	Third party
Party	Asenso Manileño	Independent	PDP–Laban
Alliance	Honey-Yul		UniTeam
Last election	16 seats, 38.89%	2 seats, 3.83%	1 seat, 4.48%
Seats won	34	2	0
Seat change	▲18	Steady	▼1
Popular vote	2,950,976	362,764	424,515
Percentage	68.56%	8.43%	9.86%

Local elections were held at Manila on May 9, 2022, as part of the Philippine general election. Held concurrently with the national elections, the electorate voted to elect a mayor, a vice mayor, thirty-six city council members and six district representatives to congress. Those elected took their respective offices on June 30, 2022, for a three-year-long term. 886,133 of 1,133,042 registered voters voted in this election.

Incumbent mayor Isko Moreno was opted to run for re-election for a second term, but he chose to run for president. Vice mayor Honey Lacuna and representative Yul Servo were elected to the mayoralty and vice mayoralty respectively, with Lacuna becoming the first woman to be elected to the office. The Asenso Manileño party became the only party represented in the city council after winning 34 seats in the legislature. The remaining two seats were won by independents Ninong Lacsamana of the 2nd district and Bobby Espiritu II of the 5th district.

Ernix Dionisio, Rolan Valeriano, Joel Chua, Edward Maceda, Irwin Tieng and Benny Abante were elected to be the representatives for the first, second, third, fourth, fifth and sixth districts respectively.

== Electoral system ==
Elections for mayor, vice mayor and for the six members of the House of Representatives are via first-past-the-post voting. For members of the city council, it is via multiple non-transferable vote, with the candidates with six highest votes winning.

Elections for mayor and vice mayor are done at an at-large basis. Elections for members of the House of Representatives of the Philippines and the Manila City Council are via the legislative districts of Manila.

There are an additional two ex officio seats in the city council, for the city federation presidents of the Liga ng mga Barangay (village councilors league) and the Sangguniang Kabataan (youth council league). These were originally elected in 2018, and whose terms were extended until 2023. Separate elections for these bodies will be in October 2023.

== Background ==
Mayor Isko Moreno and Vice Mayor Honey Lacuna are the incumbents; both are members of Aksyon Demokratiko and the local party Asenso Manileño. Moreno was elected in 2019, defeating incumbent Mayor Joseph Estrada, while Lacuna was elected in 2016, succeeding Moreno.

Moreno chose not to seek reelection as the mayor of Manila and will instead run for president of the Philippines in 2022. Asenso Manileño nominated Lacuna and incumbent 3rd district representative Yul Servo Nieto for mayor and vice mayor, respectively. Lacuna's notable challengers for mayor are former Philippine National Police DICTM deputy director Elmer Jamias (People's Reform Party), former 5th district representative Amado Bagatsing (KABAKA), and Christy Lim-Raymundo (Reporma), the daughter of former mayor Alfredo Lim, who died in 2020. Bagatsing is the son of another former mayor, Ramon Bagatsing. In 2019, Jamias lost the vice mayoralty race, while Lim-Raymundo lost the city council election. Alex Lopez (Partido Federal ng Pilipinas), the son of former mayor Mel Lopez, later joined the mayoralty race on November 10, 2021, as a substitute to Calvin Punzalan. Lopez also lost the 2019 elections in the congressional race at the 2nd district. Bagatsing also joined the mayoralty race during the substitution period; he previously ran for mayor in 2001 and in 2016 but lost.

Meanwhile, in the vice mayoralty race, Nieto notably faced actor Raymond Bagatsing of Kilusang Bagong Lipunan. Bagatsing is the nephew of mayoral candidate Amado Bagatsing, making him a grandson of former mayor Ramon Bagatsing. Raymond Bagatsing was later chosen as the running mate of Alex Lopez.

Previous potential candidates for mayor included former president and Manila Mayor Joseph Estrada and incumbent 1st district representative Manny Lopez. Estrada lost to Moreno in 2019 and said in July of the same year that he would run again for mayor. However, he did not file his Certificate of Candidacy in October 2021. Meanwhile, Lopez, another son of former Manila Mayor Mel Lopez and the current chair of the House Committee on Metro Manila Development, was chosen by the PDP–Laban–Cusi wing as its mayoral candidate but chose to seek reelection for representative instead, with his brother Alex taking his place in the mayoralty race.

== Candidates ==
=== Honey-Yul (Asenso Manileño/Aksyon Demokratiko) ===
Honey-Yul (Asenso Manileño/Aksyon Demokratiko)
#	Name	Party
For Mayor
4.	Honey Lacuna	Asenso
For Vice Mayor
3.	Yul Servo Nieto	Asenso
For Representative (1st District)
2.	Ernesto "Ernix" Dionisio Jr.	Asenso
For Representative (2nd District)
2.	Rolan Valeriano	NUP
For Representative (3rd District)
2.	Joel Chua	Asenso
For Representative (4th District)
3.	Edward Maceda	NPC
For Representative (5th District)
2.	Irwin Tieng	Asenso
For Representative (6th District)
1.	Benny Abante	NUP
For Councilor (1st District)
1.	Irma Alfonso-Juson	Asenso
4.	Niño Dela Cruz	Asenso
6.	Jesus "Taga" Fajardo Jr.	Asenso
9.	Martin "Marjun" Isidro Jr.	Asenso
10.	Moises "Bobby" Lim	Asenso
13.	Erick Ian "Banzai" Nieva	Asenso
For Councilor (2nd District)
2.	Ruben "Dr. J" Buenaventura	Asenso
6.	Macario "Macky" Lacson	Asenso
7.	Numero "Uno" Lim	Asenso
10.	Roma Paula "Roma" Robles	Asenso
12.	Darwin "Awi" Sia	Asenso
14.	Edward Tan	Asenso
For Councilor (3rd District)
1.	Terrence Alibarbar	Asenso
2.	Arlene "Maile" Atienza	Asenso
8.	Pamela "Fa" Fugoso	Asenso
10.	Ernesto "Jong" Isip Jr.	Asenso
16.	Johanna Maureen "Apple" Nieto-Rodriguez	Asenso
19.	Timothy Oliver "Tol" Zarcal	Asenso
For Councilor (4th District)
2.	Krystle Marie "Krys" Bacani	Asenso
3.	Don Juan "DJ" Bagatsing	Asenso
5.	Louisito "Doc Louie" Chua	Asenso
16.	Louisa Marie "Lady" Quintos	Asenso
17.	Science Reyes	Asenso
22.	Joel "JTV" Villanueva	Asenso
For Councilor (5th District)
1.	Daniel "Nikko" Atienza	Asenso
3.	Laris Borromeo	Asenso
12.	Jaybee "Atty. Jaybee" Hizon	Asenso
13.	Ricardo "Boy" Isip Jr.	Asenso
16.	Charry Ortega	Asenso
23.	Raymundo "Mon" Yupangco	Asenso
For Councilor (6th District)
1.	Benny "Fog" Abante III	Asenso
2.	Carlos "Caloy" Castañeda	Asenso
6.	Salvador Philip Lacuna	Asenso
11.	Elmer "Joel" Par	Asenso
12.	Luis "Joey" Uy	Asenso
14.	Luciano "Lou" Veloso	Asenso

=== Partido Federal ng Pilipinas ===
UniTeam Manila Team Lopez-Bagatsing (PFP/KBL)
#	Name	Party
For Mayor
6.	Alex Lopez	PFP
For Vice Mayor
1.	Raymond Bagatsing	KBL
For Representative (1st District)
3.	Manny Lopez	PDP–Laban
For Representative (2nd District)
1.	Carlo Lopez	Nacionalista
For Representative (3rd District)
3.	Ramon Morales	PDP–Laban
For Representative (4th District)
1.	Trisha Bonoan-David	Independent
For Representative (6th District)
2.	Bal Billanes	PRP
For Councilor (1st District)
3.	Michael De Leon	Independent
12.	Brian Mondejar	PDP–Laban
15.	Marcelino Pedrozo	PDP–Laban
17.	Atty. Eugene Santiago	PDP–Laban
18.	Edgar Solis	PDP–Laban
For Councilor (2nd District)
3.	Boyet Evangelista	Nacionalista
4.	Alex Javalla	Nacionalista
11.	Roneil Sanguyo	Nacionalista
13.	Reynulfo "Dok" Sy	Nacionalista
15.	Ivy Varona	Nacionalista
For Councilor (3rd District)
11.	Joey Uy Jamisola	PDP–Laban
13.	Nino Anthony Magno	PFP
17.	Aileen Rosales	PDP–Laban
18.	Nelson Ty	PDP–Laban
For Councilor (4th District)
9.	Carlo Dela Cruz	PDP–Laban
10.	Xtian Floriendo	PDP–Laban
12.	Jorge Andrew Lopez	PDP–Laban
15.	Bimbo Quintos	PDP–Laban
18.	Konsi Al Tan	Independent
19.	Rosmar Tan	PDP–Laban
For Councilor (5th District)
9.	DJ Ron Cruz	PFP
15.	Malou Ocsan	PFP
18.	Mahra Lorraine Tamondong	PFP
22.	Manay Glady Villar	PDDS
For Councilor (6th District)
4.	Raffy Jimenez Crespo	PDP–Laban
7.	Fernando Mercado	PDP–Laban
9.	Owen Morales	Independent
10.	Chikee Ocampo	PDP–Laban
13.	Cherry Veloira	PDP–Laban
15.	Fernan Vergel	PDP–Laban

=== Partido para sa Demokratikong Reporma ===
Partido Reporma
#	Name	Party
For Mayor
5.	Cristina "Christy" Lim-Raymundo	Reporma
For Vice Mayor
2.	Lucy Lapinig	Reporma
For Councilor (1st District)
8.	Mark Ian Halili	Reporma
For Councilor (3rd District)
12.	Valentin "Kuya Jun" Landicho	Reporma

=== People's Reform Party ===
Team Jamias/People's Reform Party
#	Name	Party
For Mayor
3.	Elmer Jamias	PRP
For Representative (4th District)
2.	Christopher Gabriel	PRP
For Councilor (4th District)
11.	Raquel Gabriel	PDP–Laban

=== Kabalikat ng Bayan sa Kaunlaran ===
Team Amado (Kabalikat ng Bayan sa Kaunlaran)
#	Name	Party
For Mayor
2.	Amado Bagatsing	KABAKA
For Representative (5th District)
1.	Amanda Christina "Cristal" Bagatsing	NUP
For Councilor (5th District)
6.	Ronald "Ronnie" Canlas	PDP–Laban/KABAKA
8.	Jaime Co Jr.	PDP–Laban/KABAKA
10.	Ariel Dakis	PDP–Laban/KABAKA
17.	Nathaniel "Kuya Nathan" Rellon	PDP–Laban
19.	Felix Tobillo Jr.	PDP–Laban/KABAKA
21.	Roderick Valbuena	KABAKA

=== Liberal Party ===
Team ATM: Atin ang Tondo Movement (Liberal Party)
#	Name	Party
For Representative (1st District)
1.	Benjamin "Atong" Asilo	Liberal
For Councilor (1st District)
2.	Victor "Toto" Baldisimo	Liberal
19.	Alexander "Mokong" Tan	Liberal

=== Partido Maharlika ===
Partido Maharlika
#	Name	Party
For Councilor (5th District)
20.	Strausser "Bistek" Tugnao	PM

=== PROMDI ===
PROMDI
#	Name	Party
For Councilor (1st District)
14.	Peter Ong	PROMDI
For Councilor (4th District)
20.	Emil Bryan "BT" Toledo	PROMDI

=== United Nationalist Alliance ===
United Nationalist Alliance
#	Name	Party
For Councilor (1st District)
16.	Ferdinand "Ferdie" Sandoval	UNA

=== Independents ===
Independent
#	Name	Party
For Mayor
1.	Onofre Abad	Independent
For Vice Mayor
4.	Arvin Reyes	Independent
For Councilor (1st District)
5.	Dominador "Dom" Estabillo Jr.	Independent
7.	Joel Gungon	Independent
11.	Sylvia Felisa Manansala	Independent
20.	Gilbert Tello	Independent
For Councilor (2nd District)
1.	Oscar "Daddybear" Baria III	Independent
5.	Rodolfo "Ninong" Lacsamana	Independent
8.	Alfonso "Atty. Ponching" Orioste Jr.	Independent
9.	Charles Michael "Mike" Rivera	Independent
For Representative (3rd District)
1.	Clark Field Arroño III	Independent
For Councilor (3rd District)
3.	Roderick Aurello	Independent
5.	Anthony De Guzman	Independent
7.	Roberto "Robert" Diaz	Independent
14.	Bernie Manikan	Independent
15.	Henryson Melon	Independent
For Councilor (4th District)
1.	Vicente "Vic" Alejaga	Independent
4.	Don Jose Javier "Havy Habagat" Bagatsing	Independent
6.	Benjamin "Benjie" Cosme	Independent
7.	Edwin Cosme	Independent
8.	Kevin Cosme	Independent
13.	John Matrimonio	Independent
14.	Jazel Panganiban	Independent
21.	Mary Ann "Inay" Victori	Independent
For Councilor (5th District)
2.	Anthony Solh Avila	Independent
4.	Injim Bacalso Bunayog	Independent
5.	Rubee Ruth "Atty. Rubee" Cagasca	Independent
7.	Rufino Cantil Jr.	Independent
11.	Roberto "Bobby" Espiritu II	Independent
14.	Wenifredo Limit	Independent
For Representative (6th District)
3.	Antonio Sityar II	Independent
For Councilor (6th District)
3.	Luisito Claudio	Independent
5.	Ernesto Go Jr.	Independent
8.	Melvin Miranda	Independent

== Opinion polling ==
=== Mayor ===
Fieldwork Date(s)	Pollster	Sample Size	MoE	Abad Ind.	Lim Reporma	Bagatsing KABAKA	Jamias PRP	Lacuna Asenso	Lopez PFP	Undecided/ Other
Apr. 25–28	PUBLiCUS Asia Inc.	1,625	±3.00%	6%	7%	15%	1%	25%	12%	26%
Apr. 8–13	PUBLiCUS Asia Inc.	—	—	7%	6%	4%	9%	26%	13%	35%
March 25		Start of Campaign Period for Local Candidates								
Mar. 15–22	RPMDinc	—	—	—	—	25%	—	53%	20%	2%
Feb. 22–28	RPMDinc	—	—	—	—	26%	—	56%	15%	3%
Feb. 18–24	PUBLiCUS Asia Inc.	—	—	—	4%	8%	3%	44%	10%	31%
Jan. 22–30	RPMDinc	—	—	—	—	30%	—	57%	11%	2%
Dec. 16–23	RPMDinc	—	—	—	—	28%	—	53%	12%	7%
Nov. 16–24	RPMDinc	—	—	—	—	31%	—	48%	14%	7%

=== Vice Mayor ===
Fieldwork Date(s)	Pollster	Sample Size	MoE	Bagatsing KBL	Lapinig Reporma	Nieto Asenso	Reyes Ind.	Undecided/ Other
Apr. 25–28	PUBLiCUS Asia Inc.	1,625	±3.00%	34%	9%	16%	9%	32%
March 25		Start of Campaign Period for Local Candidates						
Apr. 8–13	PUBLiCUS Asia Inc.	—	—	31%	14%	17%	10%	28%

== Results ==
=== Mayor ===
The incumbent mayor is Isko Moreno, who was elected in 2019 with 50.15% of the vote. Moreno is eligible for re-election but has opted to run for the presidency of the Philippines.

Asenso Manileño, Moreno's party slated vice mayor Honey Lacuna to defend the position.

Candidate	Party	Votes	%
Honey Lacuna	Asenso Manileño/Aksyon Demokratiko	538,595	63.68
Alex Lopez	Partido Federal ng Pilipinas	166,908	19.74
Amado Bagatsing	Kabalikat ng Bayan sa Kaunlaran	118,694	14.03
Cristy Lim	Partido para sa Demokratikong Reporma	14,857	1.76
Elmer Jamias	People's Reform Party	4,057	0.48
Onofre Abad	Independent	2,618	0.31
Total		845,729	100.00
Asenso Manileño hold			

=== Vice Mayor ===
The incumbent vice mayor is Honey Lacuna, who was re-elected in 2019 with 57.28% of the vote. Lacuna is eligible for re-election but has opted to run for mayor.

Asenso Manileño, Moreno's party slated 3rd District Representative Yul Servo to defend the position.

Candidate	Party	Votes	%
Yul Servo	Asenso Manileño/Aksyon Demokratiko	586,855	73.67
Raymond Bagatsing	Kilusang Bagong Lipunan	185,431	23.28
Arvin Reyes	Independent	12,310	1.55
Lucy Lapinig	Partido para sa Demokratikong Reporma	12,041	1.51
Total		796,637	100.00
Asenso Manileño hold			

=== District representatives ===
Party or alliance		Votes	%	Seats
Asenso Manileño	Aksyon Demokratiko/Asenso Manileño	240,559	29.38	3
Asenso Manileño	National Unity Party/Asenso Manileño	165,577	20.22	2
Asenso Manileño	Nationalist People's Coalition/Asenso Manileño	90,075	11.00	1
Asenso Manileño	Total	496,211	60.61	6
Uniteam Alliance	Partido Demokratiko Pilipino-Lakas ng Bayan	106,021	12.95	–
Uniteam Alliance	Nacionalista Party	42,787	5.23	–
Uniteam Alliance	People's Reform Party	22,221	2.71	–
Uniteam Alliance	Independent	25,961	3.17	–
Uniteam Alliance	Total	196,990	24.06	–
National Unity Party		80,045	9.78	–
Liberal Party		34,441	4.21	–
People's Reform Party		6,687	0.82	–
Independent		4,330	0.53	0
Total		818,704	100.00	6

==== 1st District ====
Manny Lopez is the incumbent. His opponents are Ernesto "Ernix" Dionisio Jr. and former Congressman Benjamin "Atong" Asilo.

Candidate	Party	Votes	%
Ernix Dionisio	Asenso Manileño/Aksyon Demokratiko	88,327	44.66
Manny Lopez	PDP–Laban	74,991	37.92
Atong Asilo	Liberal Party	34,441	17.42
Total		197,759	100.00
Asenso Manileño/Aksyon Demokratiko gain from PDP–Laban			

==== 2nd District ====
Rolan Valeriano is the incumbent. His opponent is former Congressman Carlo Lopez.

Candidate	Party	Votes	%
Rolan Valeriano	National Unity Party/Asenso Manileño	70,146	62.11
Carlo Lopez	Nacionalista Party	42,787	37.89
Total		112,933	100.00
National Unity Party/Asenso Manileño hold			

==== 3rd District ====
Incumbent Yul Servo is not seeking reelection to run for Vice Mayor. His party's nominee is incumbent city majority floor leader and Councilor Joel Chua. His opponents are former Councilor and incumbent Barangay 299 Captain Ramon Morales and Clark Field Arroño III.

Candidate	Party	Votes	%
Joel Chua	Asenso Manileño/Aksyon Demokratiko	68,946	67.78
Ramon Morales	PDP–Laban	31,030	30.50
Clark Field Arroño III	Independent	1,748	1.72
Total		101,724	100.00
Asenso Manileño/Aksyon Demokratiko gain from PDP–Laban			

==== 4th District ====
Edward Maceda is the incumbent. His opponents are former Congresswoman Trisha Bonoan-David and Christopher Gabriel, both happened to be his challengers in 2019.

Candidate	Party	Votes	%
Edward Maceda	Nationalist People's Coalition/Asenso Manileño	90,075	73.40
Ma. Theresa Bonoan	UniTeam	25,961	21.15
Christopher Gabriel	People's Reform Party	6,687	5.45
Total		122,723	100.00
Nationalist People's Coalition/Asenso Manileño hold			

==== 5th District ====
Amanda Christina "Cristal" Bagatsing is the incumbent. Her opponent is Councilor Irwin Tieng.

Candidate	Party	Votes	%
Irwin Tieng	Asenso Manileño/Aksyon Demokratiko	83,286	50.99
Cristal Bagatsing	National Unity Party	80,045	49.01
Total		163,331	100.00
Asenso Manileño/Aksyon Demokratiko gain from National Unity Party			

==== 6th District ====
Benny Abante is the incumbent. His opponents are Romualdo "Bal" Billanes and Antonio Sityar II.

Candidate	Party	Votes	%
Benny Abante	National Unity Party/Asenso Manileño	95,431	79.38
Romualdo Billanes	People's Reform Party	22,221	18.48
Antonio Sityar II	Independent	2,562	2.13
Total		120,214	100.00
National Unity Party/Asenso Manileño hold			

=== City Council ===
Party or alliance		Votes	%	Seats
Asenso Manileño/Aksyon Demokratiko		2,950,976	68.56	34
UniTeam Manila	Partido Demokratiko Pilipino-Lakas ng Bayan	424,515	9.86	0
UniTeam Manila	Nacionalista Party	83,943	1.95	0
UniTeam Manila	Partido Federal ng Pilipinas	38,746	0.90	0
UniTeam Manila	Pederalismo ng Dugong Dakilang Samahan	6,013	0.14	0
UniTeam Manila	Independent	20,711	0.48	0
UniTeam Manila	Total	573,928	13.33	0
Team Amado	Partido Demokratiko Pilipino-Lakas ng Bayan	106,395	2.47	0
Team Amado	Kabalikat ng Bayan sa Kaunlaran	35,909	0.83	0
Team Amado	Total	142,304	3.31	0
Liberal Party		110,823	2.57	0
Progressive Movement for the Devolution of Initiatives		91,456	2.12	0
Partido Demokratiko Pilipino-Lakas ng Bayan		46,043	1.07	0
United Nationalist Alliance		9,389	0.22	0
Partido para sa Demokratikong Reporma		8,671	0.20	0
Partido Maharlika		7,796	0.18	0
Independent		362,764	8.43	2
Ex officio seats				2
Total		4,304,150	100.00	38

==== 1st District ====
Candidate	Party	Votes	%
Jesus "Taga" Fajardo Jr.	Asenso Manileño/Aksyon Demokratiko	116,225	11.44
Erick Ian "Banzai" Nieva	Asenso Manileño/Aksyon Demokratiko	115,362	11.35
Niño Dela Cruz	Asenso Manileño/Aksyon Demokratiko	107,597	10.59
Moises "Bobby" Lim	Asenso Manileño/Aksyon Demokratiko	101,466	9.98
Irma Alfonso-Juson	Asenso Manileño/Aksyon Demokratiko	101,222	9.96
Martin "Marjun" Isidro Jr.	Asenso Manileño/Aksyon Demokratiko	98,247	9.67
Alexander "Mokong" Tan	Liberal Party	93,580	9.21
Peter Ong	PROMDI	84,527	8.32
Eugenio "Atty. Eugene" Santiago Jr.	PDP–Laban	39,310	3.87
Marcelino "Papa P" Pedrozo Jr.	PDP–Laban	38,093	3.75
Edgardo "Edgar" Solis	PDP–Laban	26,207	2.58
Joel Gungon	Independent	21,108	2.08
Brian "Bisaya" Mondejar	PDP–Laban	17,245	1.70
Victor "Toto" Baldisimo	Liberal Party	17,243	1.70
Ferdinand "Ferdie" Sandoval	United Nationalist Alliance	9,389	0.92
Sylvia Felisa Manansala	Independent	8,444	0.83
Michael De Leon	Independent	7,778	0.77
Mark Ian Halili	Partido para sa Demokratikong Reporma	6,355	0.63
Gilbert Tello	Independent	4,053	0.40
Dominador "Dom" Estabillo Jr.	Independent	2,900	0.29
Total		1,016,351	100.00
Total votes		1,016,351	–

==== 2nd District ====
Candidate	Party	Votes	%
Ruben "Dr. J" Buenaventura	Asenso Manileño/Aksyon Demokratiko	77,305	13.44
Numero "Uno" Lim	Asenso Manileño/Aksyon Demokratiko	75,756	13.17
Darwin "Awi" Sia	Asenso Manileño/Aksyon Demokratiko	69,505	12.08
Roma Paula "Roma" Robles	Asenso Manileño/Aksyon Demokratiko	65,247	11.34
Rodolfo "Ninong" Lacsamana	Independent	64,732	11.25
Macario "Macky" Lacson	Asenso Manileño/Aksyon Demokratiko	60,290	10.48
Edward Tan	Asenso Manileño/Aksyon Demokratiko	59,318	10.31
Ivy Varona	Nacionalista Party	32,007	5.56
Reynulfo "Dok" Sy	Nacionalista Party	25,489	4.43
Roneil Sanguyo	Nacionalista Party	12,695	2.21
Alfonso "Atty. Ponching" Orioste Jr.	Independent	11,566	2.01
Alexander "Alex" Javalla	Nacionalista Party	9,106	1.58
Rolando "Boyet" Evangelista	Nacionalista Party	4,646	0.81
Charles Michael "Mike" Rivera	Independent	4,290	0.75
Oscar "Daddybear" Baria III	Independent	3,338	0.58
Total		575,290	100.00
Total votes		575,290	–

==== 3rd District ====
Candidate	Party	Votes	%
Johanna Maureen "Apple" Nieto-Rodriguez	Asenso Manileño/Aksyon Demokratiko	81,675	14.47
Pamela "Fa" Fugoso	Asenso Manileño/Aksyon Demokratiko	76,729	13.59
Ernesto "Jong" Isip Jr.	Asenso Manileño/Aksyon Demokratiko	75,038	13.29
Timothy Oliver "Tol" Zarcal	Asenso Manileño/Aksyon Demokratiko	67,020	11.87
Terrence Alibarbar	Asenso Manileño/Aksyon Demokratiko	65,117	11.53
Arlene "Maile" Atienza	Asenso Manileño/Aksyon Demokratiko	64,713	11.46
Jose "Joey Uy" Jamisola	PDP–Laban	39,180	6.94
Johnny "Rollin' J" Dela Cruz	PDP–Laban	18,781	3.33
Nino Anthony Magno	Partido Federal ng Pilipinas	15,666	2.77
Ernesto "Caloy" Cruz Jr.	PDP–Laban	14,940	2.65
Nelson Ty	PDP–Laban	9,053	1.60
Aileen Rosales	PDP–Laban	7,398	1.31
Roderick Aurello	Independent	6,841	1.21
Roberto "Robert" Diaz	Independent	5,391	0.95
Bernie Manikan	Independent	5,087	0.90
Anthony De Guzman	Independent	4,349	0.77
Henryson Melon	Independent	3,036	0.54
Valentin "Kuya Jun" Landicho	Partido para sa Demokratikong Reporma	2,316	0.41
Norland Azon Gacutan	Independent	2,286	0.40
Total		564,616	100.00
Total votes		564,616	–

==== 4th District ====
Candidate	Party	Votes	%
Louisito "Doc Louie" Chua	Asenso Manileño/Aksyon Demokratiko	90,242	13.81
Krystle Marie "Krys" Bacani	Asenso Manileño/Aksyon Demokratiko	79,501	12.17
Joel "JTV" Villanueva	Asenso Manileño/Aksyon Demokratiko	73,937	11.32
Don Juan "DJ" Bagatsing	Asenso Manileño/Aksyon Demokratiko	67,717	10.36
Science Reyes	Asenso Manileño/Aksyon Demokratiko	66,592	10.19
Louisa Marie "Lady" Quintos	Asenso Manileño/Aksyon Demokratiko	65,477	10.02
Don Jose Javier "Havy Habagat" Bagatsing	Independent	42,874	6.56
Christian Mark "Xtian" Floriendo	PDP–Laban	34,229	5.24
Bimbo Eduardo Quintos XVI	PDP–Laban	32,966	5.05
Adonis "Carlo" Dela Cruz	PDP–Laban	17,601	2.69
Jorge Andrew "Kanto Boy" Lopez	PDP–Laban	16,177	2.48
Raquel "Jing" Gabriel	PDP–Laban	12,322	1.89
Kevin Cosme	Independent	9,912	1.52
Emil Bryan "BT" Toledo	PROMDI	6,929	1.06
Edwin Cosme	Independent	6,476	0.99
Vicente "Vic" Alejaga	Independent	6,128	0.94
Benjamin "Benjie" Cosme	Independent	5,915	0.91
Jazel Panganiban	Independent	5,267	0.81
Aldwin Hamilton "Konsi Al" Tan	Independent	4,610	0.71
Rosemarie "Rosmar" Tan	PDP–Laban	4,383	0.67
John Matrimonio	Independent	2,091	0.32
Mary Ann "Inay" Victori	Independent	1,981	0.30
Total		653,327	100.00
Total votes		653,327	–

==== 5th District ====
Candidate	Party	Votes	%
Laris Borromeo	Asenso Manileño/Aksyon Demokratiko	99,812	11.76
Ricardo "Boy" Isip Jr.	Asenso Manileño/Aksyon Demokratiko	96,145	11.33
Raymundo "Mon" Yupangco	Asenso Manileño/Aksyon Demokratiko	95,027	11.19
Charry Ortega	Asenso Manileño/Aksyon Demokratiko	90,955	10.72
Jaybee Hizon	Asenso Manileño/Aksyon Demokratiko	87,792	10.34
Roberto "Bobby" Espiritu II	Independent	85,685	10.09
Daniel Nikko Atienza	Asenso Manileño/Aksyon Demokratiko	79,031	9.31
Roderick Valbuena	Kabalikat ng Bayan sa Kaunlaran	35,909	4.23
Felix Tobillo Jr.	PDP–Laban	29,135	3.43
Jaime Co Jr.	PDP–Laban	22,493	2.65
Rubee Ruth Cagasca	Independent	22,343	2.63
Ariel Dakis	PDP–Laban	22,019	2.59
Nathaniel Rellon	PDP–Laban	17,773	2.09
Ronald "Ronnie" Canlas	PDP–Laban	14,975	1.76
Marilou "Malou" Ocsan	Partido Federal ng Pilipinas	10,803	1.27
Mahra Lorraine Tamondong	Partido Federal ng Pilipinas	8,114	0.96
Strausser "Bistek" Tugnao	Partido Maharlika	7,796	0.92
Gladina Villar	Pederalismo ng Dugong Dakilang Samahan	6,013	0.71
Ronaldo "DJ Ron" Cruz	Partido Federal ng Pilipinas	4,163	0.49
Anthony Solh Avila	Independent	4,042	0.48
Rufino Cantil Jr.	Independent	3,236	0.38
Wenifredo Limit	Independent	2,999	0.35
Injim Bacalso Bunayog	Independent	2,594	0.31
Total		848,854	100.00
Total votes		848,854	–

==== 6th District ====
Candidate	Party	Votes	%
Luis "Joey" Uy	Asenso Manileño/Aksyon Demokratiko	85,309	13.21
Carlos "Caloy" Castañeda	Asenso Manileño/Aksyon Demokratiko	85,228	13.20
Salvador "Philip" Lacuna	Asenso Manileño/Aksyon Demokratiko	82,076	12.71
Lou Veloso	Asenso Manileño/Aksyon Demokratiko	77,856	12.06
Benny Fog Abante III	Asenso Manileño/Aksyon Demokratiko	75,271	11.66
Elmer "Joel" Par	Asenso Manileño/Aksyon Demokratiko	75,176	11.64
Pablo Dario "Chikee" Ocampo	PDP–Laban	38,985	6.04
Fernando "Doc" Mercado	PDP–Laban	38,833	6.01
Cherry Veloira	PDP–Laban	30,025	4.65
Juan Rafael "Raffy Jimenez" Crespo	PDP–Laban	20,597	3.19
Fernando "Fernan" Vergel	PDP–Laban	14,233	2.20
Owen Morales	Independent	8,323	1.29
Ernesto Go Jr.	Independent	5,646	0.87
Melvin Miranda	Independent	4,416	0.68
Luisito Claudio	Independent	3,738	0.58
Total		645,712	100.00
Total votes		645,712	–

== Aftermath ==
Alex Lopez filed an electoral protest against Honey Lacuna's mayoral victory, alleging “electoral frauds, irregularities, and anomalies” within the election. On October 6, 2022, the Commission on Elections dismissed the protest, citing the lack of evidence as well as the usage of baseless claims. Lacuna welcomed the decision.
