= 2019 Manila local elections =

18th Mayoral election in the City of Manila

2019 Manila mayoral election
- May 13, 2019
- Turnout: 69.11%
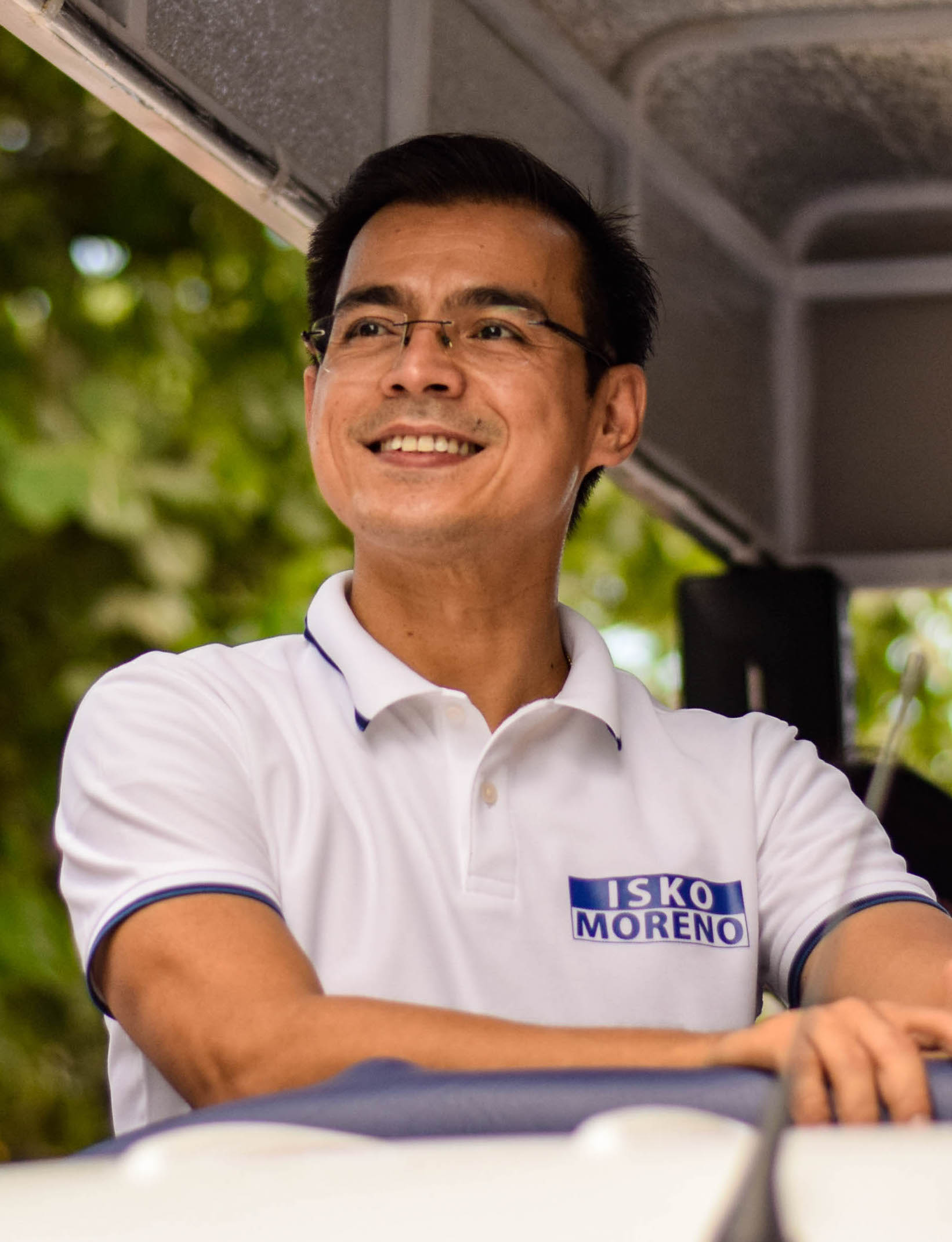

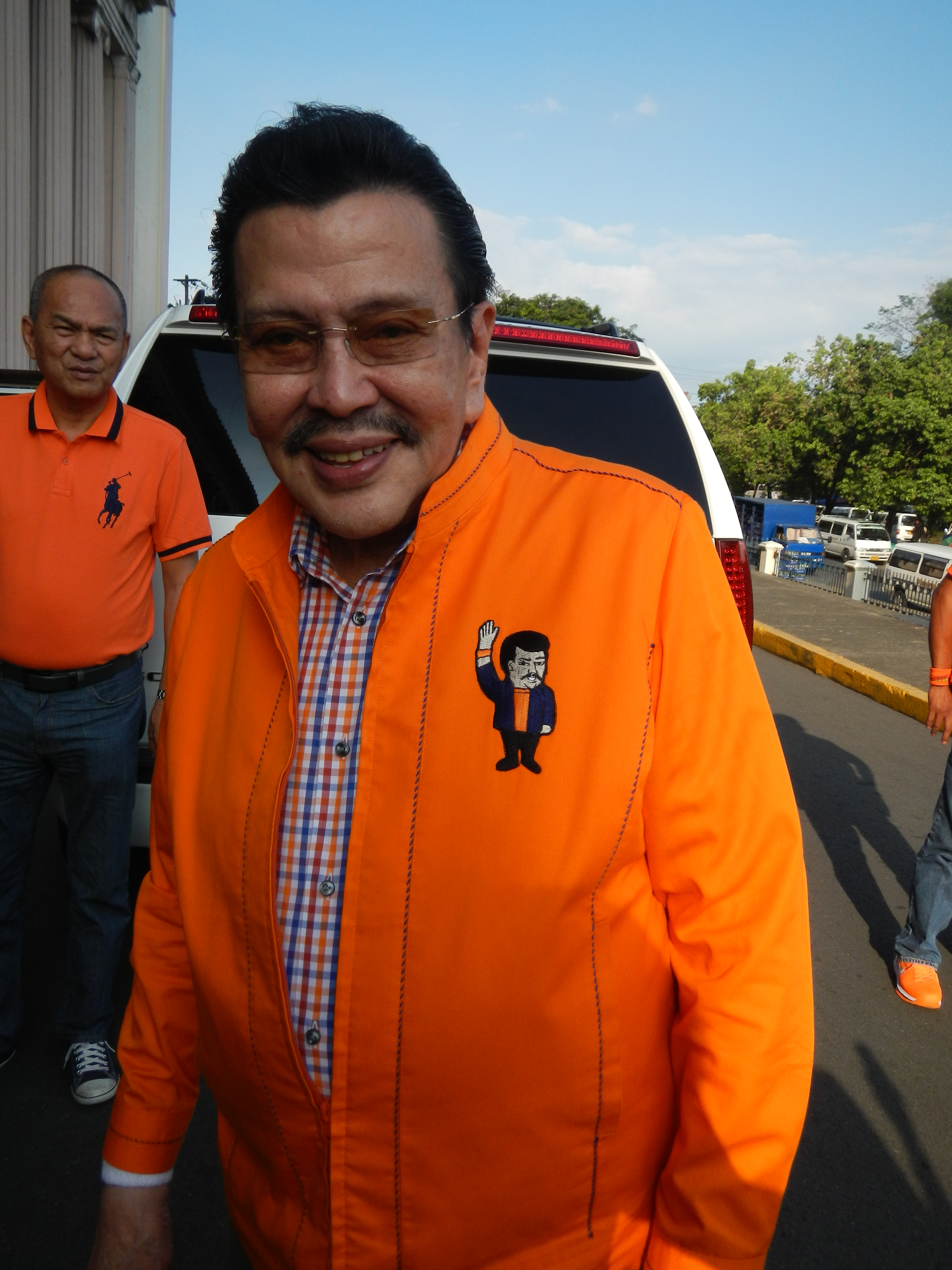

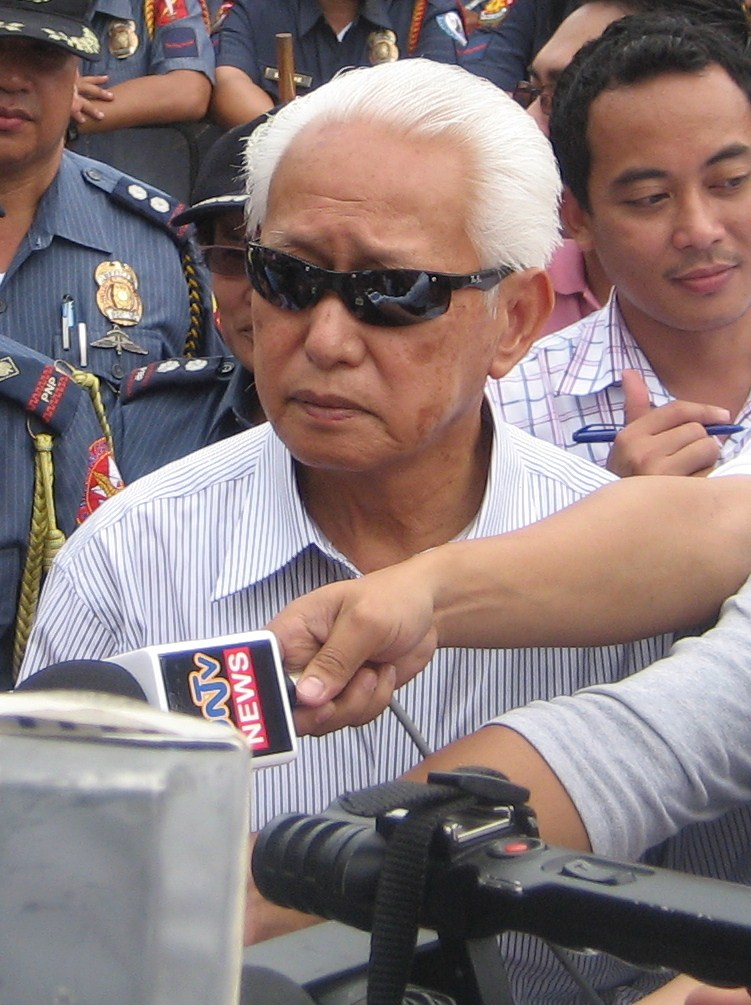
Candidate	Isko Moreno	Joseph Estrada	Alfredo Lim
Party	Asenso	PMP	PDP–Laban
Alliance	Batang Maynila	Sulong Maynila	KKK
Running mate	Honey Lacuna	Amado Bagatsing	N/A
Popular vote	357,925	210,605	138,923
Percentage	50.15%	29.51%	19.46%
- A map showing the results of the Manila mayoral election by barangay
Mayor before election
Joseph Estrada
PMP
Elected mayor
Isko Moreno
Asenso
- Vice mayoral election
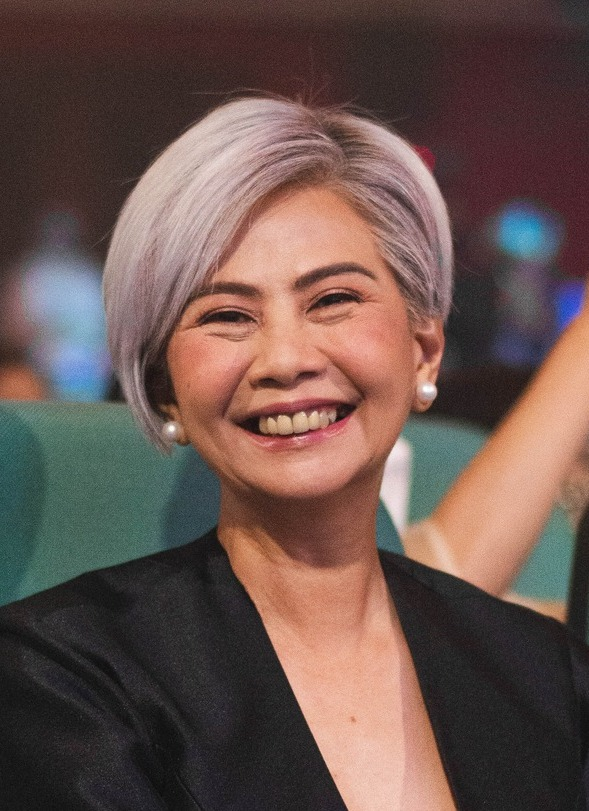

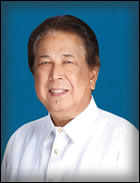
Candidate	Honey Lacuna	Amado Bagatsing
Party	Asenso	KABAKA
Alliance	Batang Maynila	Sulong Maynila
Popular vote	394,766	267,286
Percentage	57.28%	38.78%
- A map showing the results of the Manila vice mayoral election by barangay
Vice Mayor before election
Honey Lacuna
Asenso
Elected Vice Mayor
Honey Lacuna
Asenso
- City Council election

36 of 38 seats in the Manila City Council 20 seats needed for a majority
	First party	Second party	Third party
Party	PMP	Asenso Manileño	NUP
Alliance	Sulong Maynila	Batang Maynila
Last election	1	24	Did not contest
Seats won	11	16	4
Seat change	▲10	▼8	Steady
Popular vote	1,382,064	1,281,855	188,066
Percentage	41.93%	38.89 %	5.71%

Manila held its local elections on Monday, May 13, 2019, as a part of the 2019 Philippine general election. Voters elected candidates for mayor, vice mayor, 6 congressmen, and the 36 councilors that would be members of the City Council. There are a total of 736,156 people who voted out of the 1,065,149 city's registered voters. Francisco "Isko Moreno" Domagoso won the elections, enabling him to serve a three-year term as the mayor of Manila. His running mate, the incumbent vice mayor Maria Sheilah "Honey" Lacuna-Pangan, once again topped the vice mayoral race, securing her to serve her second three-year term as the city's vice mayor.

== Electoral system ==
=== For mayor, vice mayor and House district representatives ===
The winner is elected via the first-past-the-post system. The mayor and vice mayor are elected separately, and are elected at-large. Representatives are elected from each of Manila's six congressional districts.

=== For councilors ===
The winners are elected via multiple non-transferable vote in each of Manila's six city council districts (coextensive with the congressional districts). A voter has six votes, and can vote up to six people. The six candidates with the highest number of votes in each district wins.

== Candidates ==
=== Team Legacy: Sulong Maynila ===
Pwersa ng Masang Pilipino / Kabalikat ng Bayan sa Kaunlaran
Name	Party
For mayor
Joseph Ejercito Estrada	PMP
For vice mayor
Amado Bagatsing	KABAKA
For Representative (1st District)
Benjamin "Atong" Asilo	PMP
For councilor (1st district)
Roberto "Obet" Asilo	PMP
Ernesto "Dionix" Dionisio, Sr.	PMP
Silvestre "Noy" Dumagat, Jr.	PMP
Jesus "Taga" Fajardo	PMP
Peter Ong	PMP
Edgardo "Edgar" Solis	PMP
For Representative (2nd District)
Atty. Alex Lopez	Nacionalista
For councilor (2nd district)
Sheryl Cruz	PMP
Ariel Fernandez	PMP
Aniano "Nani Matibay" Mitra	PMP
Reynulfo "Dok" Sy	PMP
Nancy Valencia	PMP
Ivy Varona	Independent
For Representative (3rd District)
Zenaida "Naida" Angping	Lakas
For councilor (3rd district)
Alberto "Abet Tabako" Alonzo	PMP
Arlene Maile Atienza	PMP
Crisostomo "Atty. CB Batang Tres" Beltran	PMP
Ernesto Enrico "Caloy" Cruz	PMP
Jose "Joey" Uy Jamisola	PMP
Ramon "Mon" Morales	PMP
For Representative (4th District)
Edward Maceda	PMP
For councilor (4th district)
Krystle Marie "Krys" Bacani	PMP
Don Juan "DJ" Bagatsing	KABAKA
Antonio Archimedes Matias "Anton" Capistrano	PMP
Maria Jerika "Jerika Estrada" Ejercito	PMP
Andrew "Kanto Boy" Lopez	PMP
Eduardo "Bimbo" Quintos, XVI	PMP
For Representative (5th District)
Cristal Bagatsing	KABAKA
For councilor (5th district)
Laris Borromeo	PMP
Jose Maria "Joey" Cabreza	KABAKA
Ricardo "Boy" Isip, Jr.	PMP
Charry Ortega	PMP
Josefina "Josie" Siscar	PMP
Raymundo "Mon" Yupangco	PMP
For Representative (6th District)
Cassimiro Sison	PMP
For councilor (6th district)
Carlos "Caloy" Castañeda	PMP
Pablo Dario "Chikee" Ocampo	PMP
Erika Rivera	PMP
JR Emmanuel Sison	PMP
Christian Paul "Joey" Uy	PMP
Luciano "Lou" Veloso	PMP

=== Batang Maynila ===
Batang Maynila (Asenso Manileño)
Name	Party
For mayor
Isko Moreno Domagoso	Asenso
For vice mayor
Honey Lacuna	Asenso
For councilor (1st district)
Irma Alfonso-Juson	Asenso
Dale Evangelista	Asenso
Martin "Marjun" Isidro, Jr.	Asenso
Carter Don Logica	Asenso
Ian "Banzai" Nieva	Asenso
Diosdado "Boroboy" Santiago	Asenso
For Representative (2nd District)
Rolan Valeriano	Asenso
For councilor (2nd district)
Macario "Macky" Lacson	Asenso
Fernando "Bok" Lopez	Asenso
Mark Atilano "Jay JRS" Sagmit	Asenso
Darwin "Awi" Sia	Asenso
Renato "Gulay" Torno	Asenso
Princess Anne Crystle Viceo	Asenso
For Representative (3rd District)
Yul Servo Nieto	PDP–Laban
For councilor (3rd district)
Terrence Alibarbar	Asenso
Joel Chua	Asenso
Pamela "Fa" Fugoso	Asenso
Ernesto "Jong" Isip, Jr.	Asenso
Johanna Maureen "Apple" Nieto-Rodriguez	Asenso
Manuel "Letlet" Zarcal	Asenso
For Representative (4th District)
Trisha Bonoan-David	NUP
For councilor (4th district)
Luisito "Doc Louie" Chua	Asenso
Eduardo "Wardee" Quintos, XIV	Asenso
Science Reyes	Asenso
Joel "JTV" Villanueva	Asenso
For councilor (5th district)
Ariel Dakis	Asenso
Roberto "Bobby" Espiritu, II	Asenso
Lyn "Boo" Gernale	Asenso
Joey "TJ" Hizon, III	Nacionalista
Felibus "FPJ" Papa, Jr.	Asenso
Sheida-May "Shey" Yu	Asenso
For Representative (6th District)
Benny Abante	Asenso
For councilor (6th district)
Priscilla Marie "Princess" Abante	Asenso
Salvador Philip Lacuna	Asenso
Joel Par	Independent
Edward "EQ" Quintos	Asenso
Fernando "Fernan" Vergel	Asenso

=== Team Lim ===
Partido Demokratiko Pilipino-Lakas ng Bayan / Kapayapaan, Kaunlaran at Katarungan
Name	Party
For mayor
Alfredo S. Lim	PDP–Laban
For councilor (1st district)
Paul Dela Cruz Almario	PDP–Laban
Anacleto Kabayan	PDP–Laban
Alexander "Alex" Dionisio	PDP–Laban
Cristina "Cristy" Lim-Raymundo	PDP–Laban
Rolando "Roland" Sy	PDP–Laban
For councilor (5th district)
Benigno Addun, Jr.	PDP–Laban
Ronaldo "DJ Ron" Cruz	PDP–Laban
Geoffrey "Jograd" Dela Torre	PDP–Laban
Paulino Martin "Pau" Ejercito, Jr.	PDP–Laban
Lucy Lapinig	PDP–Laban
Gladina "Manay Glady" Villar	PDP–Laban

=== Team Ninong Lacsamana ===
National Unity Party
Name	Party
For Representatives (2nd District)
Rodolfo "Ninong" Lacsamana	NUP
For councilor (2nd district)
Nelissa "Lissa" Beltran	NUP
Ma. Theresa "Tita Jem" Buenaventura	NUP
Numero "Uno" Lim	NUP
Roma Paula Robles	NUP
Edward Tan	NUP

=== Pederalismo ng Dugong Dakilang Samahan ===
Pederalismo ng Dugong Dakilang Samahan
Name	Party
For mayor
Francis Villegas	PDDS

=== Partido ng Manggagawa at Magsasaka ===
Partido ng Manggagawa at Magsasaka (5th District)
Name	Party
For mayor
Francisco Pizarra	LM
For councilor (5th district)
Wenifredo Limit	LM

=== Independents ===
Independent
Name	Party
For mayor
Onofre Abad	Independent
Cecilia Salvador	Independent
Benjamin Rivera	Independent
For vice mayor
Elmer Jamias	Independent
Severino Reyes	Independent
Butch Cosme	Independent
Virgilio Añonuevo	Independent
For councilor (1st district)
Rommel Bronio	Independent
Jennelyn Daplas	Independent
Moises "Bobby" Lim	Independent
Vergel "Tata Ver" Navarro	Independent
Ferdinand "Ferdie" Sandoval	Independent
Atty. Eugene Santiago	Independent
Elizabeth "Elsie" Santos	Independent
Alexander "Mokong" Tan	Independent
Alberto "Al" Valenzona	Independent

Independent
Name	Party
For councilor (2nd district)
Ricarte Dioquino	Independent
Joselito "Joey Itoy" Ejercito	Independent
Jonathan Redonga	Independent
Luis "Beautiful" Reyes, Jr.	Independent
Arlene "ATM" Tan	Independent
Carlito "Pastor Charlie" Villanueva	Independent
For councilor (3rd district)
Joaquin Ang	Independent
Marcos Rolando "Don Don" Escolar Chua, Jr.	Independent
Valentin "Kuya Jun V-Plus" Landicho, Jr.	Independent

Independent
Name	Party
For councilor (4th district)
Ruben Cosme, Jr.	Independent
Alexander Lim	Independent
For councilor (5th district)
Anthony Sohl Avila	Independent
Rufino Cantil, Jr.	Independent
Ananias "Kuya Anni" Matulac	Independent
William Irwin Tieng	Independent
Jason "Jaz" Tumanda	Independent
Marlon Villarojas	Independent
For councilor (6th district)
Reynaldo Abot	Independent
Richard "Cardo" Lontoc	Independent
Jesus "Jessie Delgado" Porciuncula, Jr.	Independent
Cherry Veloira	Independent

== Mayoralty and vice mayoral elections ==
=== Mayor ===
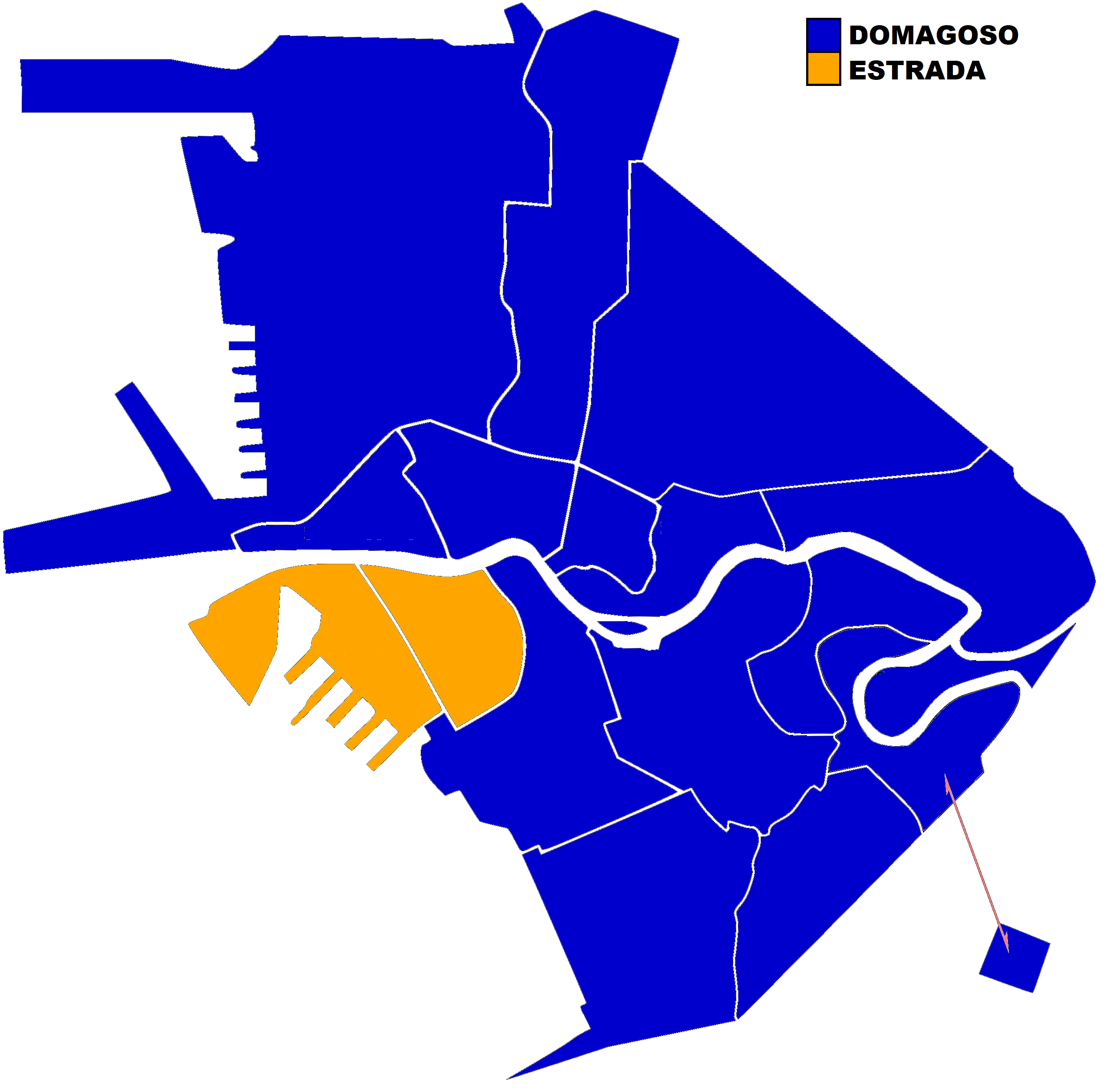
Electoral Result per Division for Mayoral Position in Manila

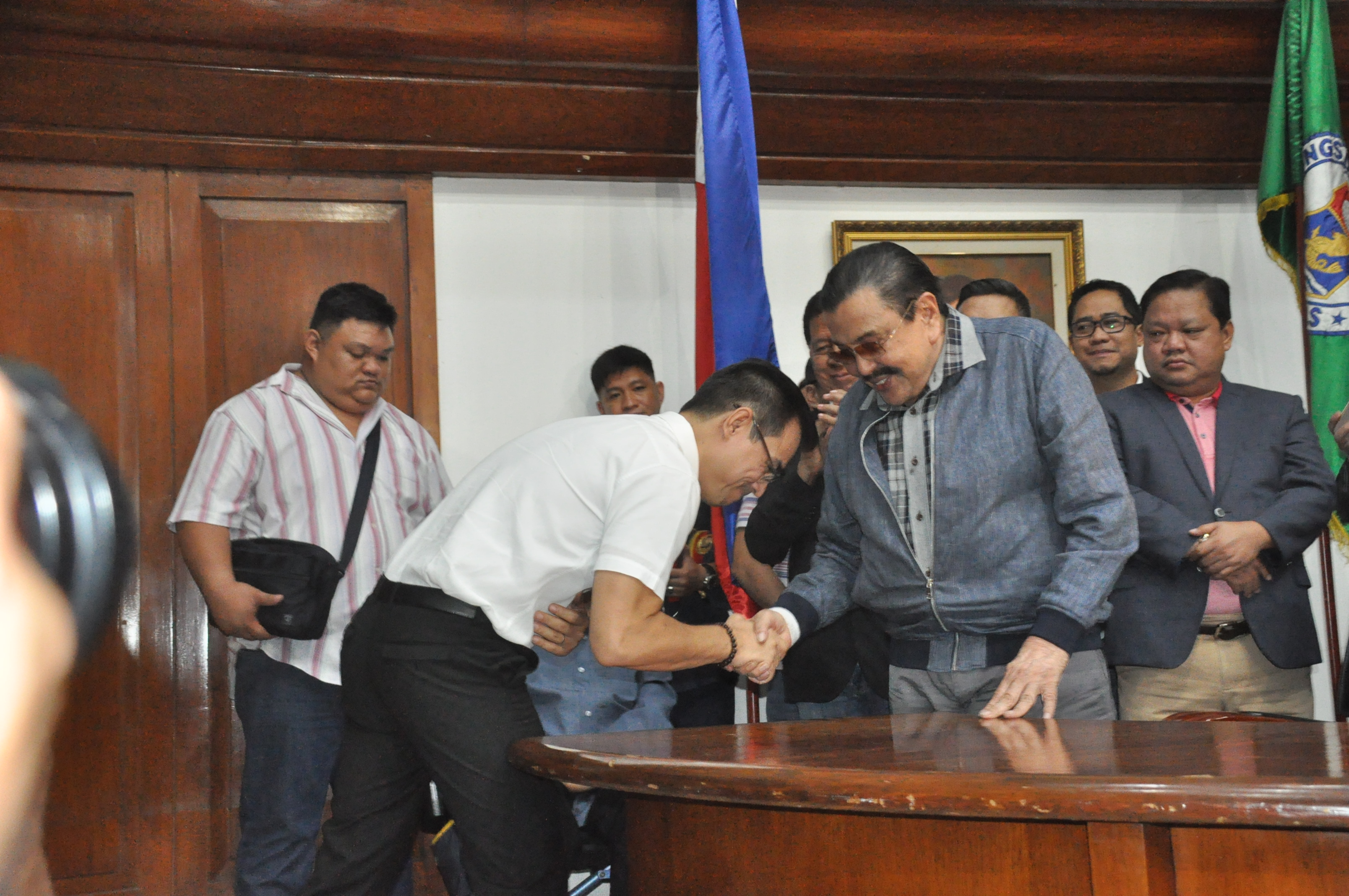
Mayor-elect Isko Moreno (second from left) paying a courtesy visit to then outgoing mayor Joseph Estrada (second from right) weeks after defeating the latter

Joseph Estrada is running for his third term as the Mayor of Manila. Meanwhile, Alfredo Lim is seeking to make his comeback as the mayor after being defeated by Estrada twice in the 2013 and 2016 elections. Meanwhile, Francisco "Isko Moreno" Domagoso, the youngest mayoralty candidate and who served as Vice Mayor for both Estrada and Lim, is running for the first time as the mayor. Lim is the only mayoral candidate without a running mate.

Manila Mayoralty Election
Party	Candidate	Votes	%
Asenso	Isko Moreno	357,925	50.15
PMP	Joseph Estrada (incumbent)	210,605	29.51
PDP–Laban	Alfredo Lim	138,923	19.47
PDDS	Francis Villegas	2,262	0.32
Independent	Onofre Abad	1,299	0.18
Independent	Cecilia Salvador	983	0.14
LM	Francisco Pizarra	918	0.13
Independent	Benjamin Rivera	733	0.10
Total votes		713,648	100.00
Asenso gain from PMP			

=== Opinion polling ===
Fieldwork Date(s)	Pollster	Sample Size	MoE	Estrada PMP	Moreno Asenso	Lim PDPLBN
Apr 10–14, 2019	Laylo Research	1,500	–	39%	30%	22%
Mar 18–22, 2019	Probe Data	1,800	–	45.9%	34%	17.8%

=== Vice Mayor ===
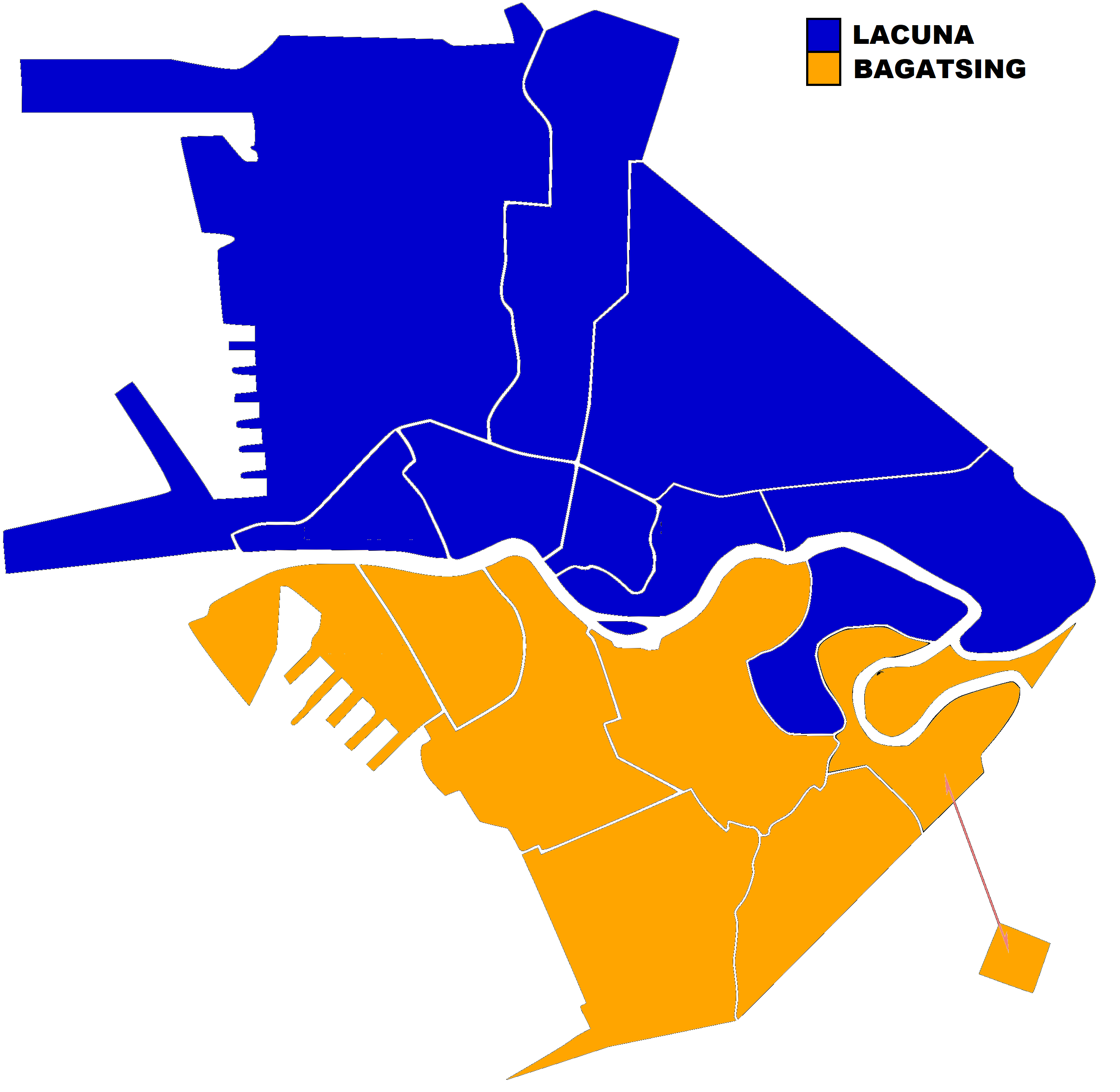
Electoral Result per Division for Vice Mayoral Position in Manila

Ma. Sheilah "Honey" Lacuna-Pangan is running for her second term.

Manila Vice Mayoralty Election
Party	Candidate	Votes	%
Asenso	Honey Lacuna (incumbent)	394,766	57.28
KABAKA	Amado Bagatsing	267,286	38.78
Independent	Elmer Jamias	13,876	2.01
Independent	Severino Reyes	6,438	0.93
Independent	Butch Cosme	3,894	0.56
Independent	Virgilio Añonuevo	2,828	0.33
Total votes		689,088	100.00
Asenso hold			

== House of Representatives elections ==
=== 1st District ===
Manuel Luis "Manny" Lopez (NPC, supported by PDP-Laban and KKK) is the incumbent, and he will face former representative Benjamin "Atong" Asilo to contest a second term. Lopez is the son of former Manila Mayor Mel Lopez. Asenso Manileño did not nominate any candidate in this district.

2019 Philippine House of Representatives election in the 1st District of Manila
Party	Candidate	Votes	%
NPC	Manuel Luis "Manny" Lopez (incumbent)	86,993	54.27
PMP	Benjamin "Atong" Asilo	73,306	45.73
Total votes		160,299	100.00
NPC hold			

=== 2nd District ===
Carlo Lopez is the incumbent, and is term-limited. His cousin Alex is running under the Nacionalista Party, with support from PMP and KABAKA; Carlo is a member of PDP-Laban. Also running are incumbent councilors Rolan Valeriano (Asenso Manileño) and Rodolfo "Ninong" Lacsamana (NUP). The coalition of PDP-Laban and KKK did not nominate any candidate in this district.

2019 Philippine House of Representatives election in the 2nd District of Manila
Party	Candidate	Votes	%
Asenso	Rolan Valeriano	34,861	36.52
Nacionalista	Alex Lopez	32,215	33.75
NUP	Rodolfo "Ninong" Lacsamana	28,379	29.73
Total votes		95,455	100.00
Asenso gain from PDP–Laban			

=== 3rd District ===
John Marvin "Yul Servo" Nieto is the incumbent, and was running under the PDP-Laban banner with support from Asenso Manileño. He faced former representative Zenaida "Naida" Angping, who was running under Lakas–CMD and supported by PMP and KABAKA.

2019 Philippine House of Representatives election in the 3rd District of Manila
Party	Candidate	Votes	%
PDP–Laban	John Marvin "Yul Servo" Nieto (incumbent)	65,153	67.81
Lakas	Zenaida Angping	30,925	32.19
Total votes		96,078	100.00
PDP–Laban hold			

=== 4th District ===
Edward Maceda is the incumbent and ran against former representative Maria Theresa "Trisha" Bonoan-David (NUP, supported by Asenso Manileño) and independent candidate barangay kagawad Christopher "Chris" Gabriel. This is the second time that the PDP-Laban-KKK coalition chose not to nominate any candidate.

2019 Philippine House of Representatives election in the 4th District of Manila
Party	Candidate	Votes	%
PMP	Edward Maceda (incumbent)	63,298	60.19
Asenso	Ma. Theresa David	30,238	28.75
Independent	Christopher Gabriel	11,621	11.06
Total votes		105,157	100.00
PMP hold			

=== 5th District ===
Amanda Cristina "Cristal" Bagatsing is the incumbent, and will face former councilor Arnold "Ali" Atienza. Bagatsing supported Estrada's re-election bid. Both Asenso Manileño and PDP-Laban-KKK did not have a candidate.

2019 Philippine House of Representatives election in the 5th District of Manila
Party	Candidate	Votes	%
KABAKA	Amanda Cristina "Cristal" Bagatsing (incumbent)	65,836	50.41
Lakas	Arnold "Ali" Atienza	64,748	49.59
Total votes		130,584	100.00
KABAKA hold			

=== 6th District ===
Rosenda Ann "Sandy" Ocampo is the incumbent but she is now term-limited. She has endorsed her younger sister Patricia Yvette Ocampo, to run for her seat in the House of Representatives. Yvette registered as a candidate under Bagumbayan-VNP (supported by PDP-Laban and Alfredo Lim's KKK Party) and prior to her candidacy had been appointed by President Rodrigo Duterte as chair of the Nayong Pilipino Foundation. However, even after Lim's endorsement, the Ocampos chose to campaign for Estrada's re-election. Ocampo's arch-rival, former representative Bienvenido "Benny" Abante, is also running under Asenso Manileño, as well as incumbent City Councilor and fiscal Casimiro Sison under Pwersa ng Masang Pilipino's Team Legacy.

2019 Philippine House of Representatives election in the 6th District of Manila
Party	Candidate	Votes	%
Asenso	Bienvenido Abante	49,795	46.21
Bagumbayan	Patricia Yvette Ocampo	33,731	31.30
PMP	Casimiro "Cassy" Sison	24,239	22.49
Total votes		107,765	100.00
Asenso gain from PDP–Laban			

== City Council elections ==
Party	Votes	%	Seats
Pwersa ng Masang Pilipino	1,382,064	41.93	11
Asenso Manileño	1,281,855	38.89	16
National Unity Party	188,066	5.71	4
Partido Demokratiko Pilipino-Lakas ng Bayan	147,772	4.48	1
Kabalikat ng Bayan sa Kaunlaran	98,000	2.97	1
Nacionalista Party	71,561	2.17	1
Labor Party Philippines	1,045	0.03	0
Independent	126,111	3.83	2
Ex officio seats			2
Total	3,296,474	100.00	38

=== 1st District ===
2019 Manila City Council election at the 1st district of Manila
Party	Candidate	Votes	%
PMP	Ernesto "Dionix" Dionisio, Sr.	81,238	
PDP–Laban	Moises "Bobby" Lim	71,302	
Asenso	Erick Ian "Banzai" Nieva	62,077	
PMP	Peter Ong	60,898	
Asenso	Irma Alfonso-Juson	58,698	
PMP	Jesus "Taga" Fajardo	57,222	
Independent	Alexander Tan	55,755	
Asenso	Diosdado "Boroboy" Santiago	52,988	
PMP	Roberto "Obet" Asilo	52,580	
Asenso	Martin "Marjun" Isidro, Jr.	49,815	
Independent	Atty. Eugene Santiago	32,959	
PDP–Laban	Alexander "Alex" Dionisio	27,372	
PDP–Laban	Rolando Sy	24,661	
PDP–Laban	Cristina "Christy" Lim-Raymundo	24,140	
Asenso	Carter Don Logica	23,292	
PMP	Eduardo Solis	22,259	
Asenso	Dale Evangelista	20,791	
PDP–Laban	Paul Dela Cruz Almario	13,571	
PMP	Silvestre "Noy" Dumagat, Jr.	12,811	
Independent	Alberto Valenzona	9,268	
Independent	Vergel "Tata Ver" Navarro	7,634	
PDP–Laban	Anacleto "Kabayan" De Jesus	7,506	
Independent	Ferdinand "Ferdie" Sandoval	4,795	
Independent	Elizabeth "Elsie" Santos	3,153	
Independent	Rommel "Tito Mel" Bronio	1,974	
Independent	Jennelyn Daplas	1,902	
Total votes		840,658	100.00

=== 2nd District ===
2019 Manila City Council election at the 2nd district of Manila
Party	Candidate	Votes	%
NUP	Numero "Uno" Lim	44,065	
Asenso	Darwin "Awi" Sia	42,985	
Asenso	Macario "Macky" Lacson	41,437	
NUP	Edward Tan	40,030	
NUP	Roma Paula Robles	38,539	
NUP	Ma. Theresa "Tita Jem" Buenaventura	37,704	
Asenso	Princess Anne Crystle Viceo	31,771	
PFP	Ivy Varona	29,636	
PMP	Nancy Valencia	27,775	
NUP	Nelissa "Lissa" Beltran	27,728	
PMP	Sheryl Rose Anna Marie Cruz	26,305	
Asenso	Mark Atilano "Jay JRS" Sagmit	26,179	
Asenso	Fernando "Bok" Lopez	25,602	
Asenso	Renato "Gulay" Torno	12,481	
Independent	Arlene "ATM" Tan	11,263	
PMP	Reynulfo "Dok" Sy	8,696	
Independent	Carlito "Pastor Charlie" Villanueva	8,221	
PMP	Ariel Fernandez	5,388	
PMP	Aniano "Nani Matibay" Mitra	4,501	
Independent	Luis "Beautiful" Reyes, Jr.	2,166	
Independent	Ricarte Dioquino	1,673	
Independent	Jonathan Redonga	1,305	
Total votes		495,450	100.00

=== 3rd District ===
2019 Manila City Council election at the 3rd district of Manila
Party	Candidate	Votes	%
Asenso	Johanna Maureen "Apple" Nieto-Rodriguez	59,616	
Asenso	Pamela "Fa" Fugoso	54,985	
Asenso	Ernesto "Jong" Isip, Jr.	51,128	
Asenso	Joel Chua	49,515	
Asenso	Terrence Alibarbar	48,714	
Asenso	Manuel "Letlet" Zarcal	44,180	
PMP	Maile Atienza	43,061	
PMP	Crisostomo "Atty. CB Batang Tres" Beltran	37,058	
PMP	Ramon Morales	36,962	
PMP	Jose "Joey" Uy Jamisola	30,370	
PMP	Ernesto Enrico "Caloy" Cruz	16,444	
PMP	Alberto "Abet Tabako" Alonzo	14,809	
Independent	Marcos Rolando "Don Don" Escolar Chua, Jr.	5,222	
Independent	Joaquin Ang	4,989	
Independent	Valentin "Kuya Jun V-Plus" Landicho, Jr.	2,524	
Total votes		499,577	100.00

=== 4th District ===
2019 Manila City Council election at the 4th district of Manila
Party	Candidate	Votes	%
Asenso	Luisito "Doc Louie" Chua	76,174	
PMP	Krystle Marie "Krys" Bacani	68,817	
Asenso	Eduardo "Wardee" Quintos, XIV	57,687	
Asenso	Science Reyes	57,574	
Asenso	Joel "JTV" Villanueva	57,005	
KABAKA	Don Juan "DJ" Bagatsing	55,828	
PMP	Antonio "Anton" Archimedes Matias Capistrano	52,675	
PMP	Maria Jerika "Jerika Estrada" Ejercito	47,825	
PMP	BimboEduardo Quintos, XVI	43,296	
PMP	Andrew "Kanto Boy" Lopez	19,167	
Independent	Alexander Lim	6,623	
Total votes		542,671	100.00

=== 5th District ===
2019 Manila City Council election at the 5th district of Manila
Party	Candidate	Votes	%
Independent	William Irwin Tieng	79,940	
PMP	Raymundo "Mon" Yupangco	73,034	
PMP	Laris Borromeo	72,541	
Nacionalista	Joey "TJ" Hizon, III	71,561	
PMP	Ricardo "Boy" Isip, Jr.	67,562	
PMP	Charry Ortega	60,132	
PMP	Josefina Siscar	49,726	
KABAKA	Jose Maria Cabreza	42,172	
Asenso	Roberto "Bobby" Espiritu, II	39,444	
Asenso	Lyn "Boo" Gernale	23,921	
Asenso	Felibus "FPJ" Papa, Jr.	23,640	
Asenso	Ariel Dakis	14,101	
Asenso	Sheida-May Yu	11,547	
Independent	Ananias "Kuya Anni" Matulac	9,367	
PDP–Laban	Benigno Addun, Jr.	9,307	
PDP–Laban	Geoffrey "Jograd" Dela Torre	8,902	
PDP–Laban	Paulino Martin Ejercito, Jr.	7,661	
PDP–Laban	Gladina "Manay Glady" Villar	7,002	
PDP–Laban	Lucy Lapinig	2,987	
PDP–Laban	Ronaldo "DJ Ron" Cruz	2,702	
Independent	Marlon Villarojas	2,519	
Independent	Anthony Sohl Avila	2,422	
Independent	Jason "Jaz" Tumanda	1,880	
Independent	Rufino Cantil, Jr.	1,808	
LM	Wenifredo Limit	1,045	
Total votes		686,923	100.00

=== 6th District ===
2019 Manila City Council election at the 6th district of Manila
Party	Candidate	Votes	%
Independent	Joel Par	66,721	
Asenso	Salvador Philip Lacuna	64,430	
Asenso	Priscilla Marie "Princess" Abante	62,888	
PMP	Carlos "Caloy" Castañeda	58,933	
PMP	Christian Paul "Joey" Uy	58,810	
PMP	Luciano "Lou" Veloso	48,269	
PMP	Pablo Dario "Chikee" Ocampo	47,458	
PMP	JR Emmanuel Sison	38,398	
PMP	Erika Rivera	37,044	
Independent	Cherry Veloira	21,145	
Asenso	Edward "EQ" Quintos	19,723	
Asenso	Fernando Vergel	17,470	
PDP–Laban	Juan Rafael "Raffy Jimenez" Crespo	6,064	
PDP–Laban	Angel Agub	5,897	
Independent	Jesus "Jessie Delgado" Porciuncula, Jr.	2,469	
Independent	Richard "Cardo" Lontoc	2,333	
Independent	Reynaldo Abot	1,370	
Total votes		559,422	100.00
