= Cristy Lim =

Filipino politician

Cristy Lim Raymundo
- Born: Cristina Santos Lim; Manila, Philippines
- Political party: Reporma (2021–present); KKK (local party; 2012–present); PDP–Laban (2018–2021); Independent (2012–2018)
- Parent: Alfredo Lim (father); Amalia Santos (mother)

Cristina Santos Lim Raymundo, better known as Cristy Lim, is a Filipino politician. She is the daughter of former police general and former Mayor of Manila Alfredo Lim.

== Political career ==
Raymundo run as city councilor in 2013, under her father's campaign, but also as independent and lost. She also run in the same position in 2019, again under her father's slate (under Koko Pimentel's PDP—Laban), but still lost.

In 2022, she run for Mayor under Partido Reporma, with Lucy Lapinig as her running mate. She campaigned for Ten-point Agenda that includes Clean Government, Health, Response, Investment, Tourism, Safety, Youth, Livelihood, Infrastructure, and the Manilenos. But she lost to incumbent Vice Mayor Honey Lacuna.

== Electoral record ==
=== 2022 ===
Manila Mayoral Election
Party	Candidate	Votes	%
Asenso	Honey Lacuna	538,595	63.68
PFP	Alexander Lopez	166,908	19.74
KABAKA	Amado Bagatsing	118,694	14.03
Reporma	Cristina Lim-Raymundo	14,857	1.76
PRP	Elmer Jamias	4,057	0.48
Independent	Onofre Abad	2,618	0.31
Total votes		845,729	100.00
Asenso hold			

=== 2019 ===
2019 Manila City Council election at the 1st district of Manila
Party	Candidate	Votes	%
PMP	Ernesto "Dionix" Dionisio, Sr.	81,238	
PDP–Laban	Moises "Bobby" Lim	71,302	
Asenso	Erick Ian "Banzai" Nieva	62,077	
PMP	Peter Ong	60,898	
Asenso	Irma Alfonso-Juson	58,698	
PMP	Jesus "Taga" Fajardo	57,222	
Independent	Alexander Tan	55,755	
Asenso	Diosdado "Boroboy" Santiago	52,988	
PMP	Roberto "Obet" Asilo	52,580	
Asenso	Martin "Marjun" Isidro, Jr.	49,815	
Independent	Atty. Eugene Santiago	32,959	
PDP–Laban	Alexander "Alex" Dionisio	27,372	
PDP–Laban	Rolando Sy	24,661	
PDP–Laban	Cristina "Christy" Lim-Raymundo	24,140	
Asenso	Carter Don Logica	23,292	
PMP	Eduardo Solis	22,259	
Asenso	Dale Evangelista	20,791	
PDP–Laban	Paul Dela Cruz Almario	13,571	
PMP	Silvestre "Noy" Dumagat, Jr.	12,811	
Independent	Alberto Valenzona	9,268	
Independent	Vergel "Tata Ver" Navarro	7,634	
PDP–Laban	Anacleto "Kabayan" De Jesus	7,506	
Independent	Ferdinand "Ferdie" Sandoval	4,795	
Independent	Elizabeth "Elsie" Santos	3,153	
Independent	Rommel "Tito Mel" Bronio	1,974	
Independent	Jennelyn Daplas	1,902	
Total votes		840,658	100.00

=== 2013 ===
2013 Manila City Council election at the 1st district
Party	Candidate	Votes	%
UNA	Ernesto Dionisio, Jr.	76,946	12.05
UNA	Erick Ian "Banzai" Nieva	70,925	11.10
Liberal	Roberto Asilo	60,623	9.49
Liberal	Niño Dela Cruz	59,768	9.36
UNA	Dennis Alcoreza	59,309	9.29
UNA	Irma Alfonso	54,619	8.55
UNA	Jesus Fajardo	51,821	8.11
Liberal	Moises "Bobby" Lim	46,043	7.21
UNA	Arlene Koa	35,874	5.62
Independent	Cristina "Cristy Lim" Lim-Raymundo	34,379	5.38
Liberal	Rolando Sy	33,908	5.31
Liberal	Joey Venancio	24,915	3.90
Liberal	Silvestre Dumagat, Jr.	14,534	2.28
Independent	Ferdinand Sandoval	5,462	0.86
Independent	Rejercito Aranas	3,314	0.52
DPP	Roberto Garrate	2,028	0.32
Independent	Eduardo Lanuza	1,237	0.19
Independent	Crispin Balbeja	1,113	0.17
Independent	Joey Longanilla	1,099	0.17
Independent	Alden Obejas	814	0.13
