= Manny Lopez (legislator) =

Filipino politician (born 1961)

Member of the Philippine House of Representatives from Manila's 1st congressional district
- In office June 30, 2016 – June 30, 2022
- Preceded by: Benjamin Asilo
- Succeeded by: Ernesto Dionisio Jr.

President of the Amateur Boxing Association of the Philippines
- In office 1993–2009

Personal details
- Born: August 18, 1961 (age 65) Quezon City, Philippines
- Party: Asenso Manileño (2024–present)
- Other political affiliations: PDP–Laban (2021–2024); NPC (2007–2021)
- Parent: Mel Lopez (father)
- Relatives: Alex Lopez (brother); Gilberto Duavit Jr. (brother-in-law); Carlo Lopez (cousin)
- Occupation: Politician

Manuel Luis "Manny" Tantoco Lopez (born August 18, 1961) is a Filipino politician and former sports executive who is the former Representative from Manila's 1st congressional district, which comprises the western side of Tondo, the largest of the city's sixteen districts.

== Early life and education ==
Lopez is the son of former Manila mayor Mel Lopez, who served in the role from 1986 to 1992, with businesswoman and entrepreneur Concepcion Tantoco. Manny was already a congressman when he confirmed his father's death in 2017.

Carlo Lopez, the former congressman from the neighboring 2nd district, is his cousin.

== Sports administration career ==
Prior to entering politics, Lopez was a sports executive. Following the appointment of his father as the chairman of the Philippine Sports Commission in 1993, the younger Lopez succeeded him as the president of the Amateur Boxing Association of the Philippines, a position he served until 2009. During his term, amateur boxer Onyok Velasco won a silver medal for the Philippines at the 1996 Summer Olympics in Atlanta, United States, in the light flyweight division. The Philippines also won five gold medals at the Asian Games within that period.

Lopez later served as the first vice president of the Philippine Olympic Committee (POC). He was the chef de mission of the country's delegation to the 2012 Summer Olympics in London, United Kingdom. As the POC's vice president, he criticized the lack of autonomy given to national sports associations under the presidency of Peping Cojuangco. This was his proposition for his unsuccessful re-election bid in November 2012, losing the position to Joey Romasanta. Lopez was also the secretary general of the Philippine Handball Federation.

== Political career ==
Lopez was elected as representative of Manila's 1st district in 2016 House of Representatives election as a member of the Nationalist People's Coalition (NPC). He successfully defended his seat in 2019 for his second term. A defeated candidate, former congressman Benjamin Asilo, protested Lopez's victory at the House of Representatives Electoral Tribunal. In late 2020, the tribunal dismissed Asilo's protest, which it said was done on a "gut feel," confirming Lopez's victory.

For the 2022 mayoral election, the Alfonso Cusi-led faction of the ruling party PDP–Laban endorsed him as their nominee. Lopez was subsequently endorsed by President Rodrigo Duterte. The mayoral election was then seen as a race between Lopez and current vice mayor Honey Lacuna, but Lopez withdrew and decided to defend his congressional seat for a third and final consecutive term instead. His brother, lawyer Alex Lopez, ran in his stead. However, he lost the congressional race to former councilor Ernix Dionisio. He sought a comeback to the same post in 2025, this time under Asenso Manileño, but lost once again to Dionisio.

== Electoral history ==
Electoral history of Manny Lopez
Year	Office	Party	Votes received				Result
Year	Office	Party	Total	%	P.	Swing	Result
2016	Representative (Manila–1st)	NPC	55,627	35.3	1st	—N/a	Won
2019	Representative (Manila–1st)	NPC	86,993	54.27	1st	+18.97	Won
2022	Representative (Manila–1st)	PDP–Laban	88,327	44.66	2nd	-10.01	Lost
2025	Representative (Manila–1st)	Asenso	16,334	7.61	3rd	-37.05	Lost
