= Alex Lopez (politician) =

Filipino lawyer and government official

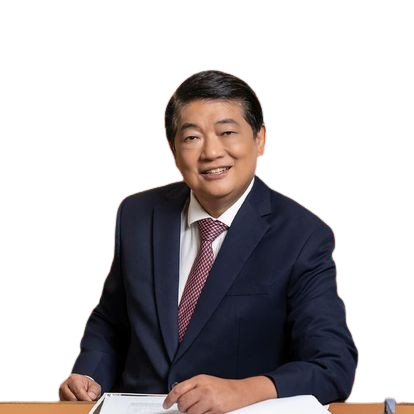
- Lopez in 2024

Chair of the Philippine Reclamation Authority
- Incumbent
- Assumed office November 2023
- President: Bongbong Marcos
- Preceded by: Henry A. Robinson Jr.

Personal details
- Born: Alexander Tantoco Lopez; November 15, 1958 (age 67) Tondo, Manila, Philippines
- Party: PFP (2021–present)
- Other political affiliations: Nacionalista (2018–2021)
- Parent: Mel Lopez (father)
- Relatives: Manny Lopez (brother); Gilberto Duavit Jr. (brother-in-law); Carlo Lopez (cousin)
- Education: Ateneo de Manila University
- Occupation: Lawyer, businessman, government official

Alexander Tantoco Lopez (born November 15, 1958) is a Filipino lawyer, businessman, and government official. He is the chairperson of the Philippine Reclamation Authority (PRA) under the administration of President Bongbong Marcos. He is the son of former Manila Mayor Mel Lopez, and brother of former Manila 1st district congressman Manny Lopez. He is also the chairperson and CEO of Pacific Concrete Products Inc.

== Philippine Reclamation Authority Chairman ==
As Chairman of the Philippine Reclamation Authority (PRA), Alex Lopez said the agency is considering a proposal from the Bureau of Fisheries and Aquatic Resources (BFAR) to title illegally reclaimed coastal areas and convert them into legal ports and livelihood hubs for fisherfolk, with priority given to projects that benefit poor communities.

The initiative includes port rehabilitation and modernization projects in multiple regions, beginning with a ₱200-million upgrade of the pier in Talisayan, Misamis Oriental, alongside similar developments in other provinces. The program also aims to resolve land tenure issues and implement an LGU–Cooperative Management Model to ensure long-term benefits for fisherfolk and related sectors.

The PRA reported a net income of ₱89.86 billion (about US$1.6 billion) in 2023, an increase from previous years. It was ranked among the most profitable government-owned and controlled corporations in the Philippines that year.

== Legal career ==
A graduate of Ateneo Law in 1985, Lopez worked for his father as his chief of staff and personal assistant.

== Business career ==
Lopez is the chairperson and chief executive officer of Pacific Concrete Products Inc. (PCPI), a contractor classified as Quadruple-A, the highest level granted to construction firms in the Philippines.

Under Lopez’s leadership, PCPI has contributed to several infrastructure projects across the country, including road networks in Bonifacio Global City, the SM Mall of Asia complex, the Central Luzon Link Expressway (CLLEX), and the Samar Pacific Road Project. From 2000 to 2004, the company received consecutive Safest Quarry Operation Awards and was recognized by the Armed Forces of the Philippines Air Logistic Command for its support to the Air Force Research and Development Center.

== Political career ==
Lopez ran for Mayor of Manila in the 2022 elections under the Partido Federal ng Pilipinas, with Raymond Bagatsing of Kilusang Bagong Lipunan as his running mate. He and Bagatsing were defeated by incumbent vice mayor Honey Lacuna and congressman Yul Servo, respectively.

Lopez filed an electoral protest against Lacuna's victory, alleging "electoral frauds, irregularities, and anomalies" in the election. On October 6, 2022, the Commission on Elections dismissed the protest, citing lack of evidence and baseless claims.

== Government career ==
In 2023, Marcos appointed Lopez as the chairperson of the Philippine Reclamation Authority (PRA). As PRA chair, Lopez was tasked with leading the agency in regulating and overseeing all reclamation projects in the Philippines under Marcos's Build Better More program.

== Electoral performance ==
=== 2022 ===
Manila Mayoral Election
Party	Candidate	Votes	%
Asenso	Honey Lacuna	538,595	63.68
PFP	Alexander Lopez	166,908	19.74
KABAKA	Amado Bagatsing	118,694	14.03
Reporma	Cristina Lim-Raymundo	14,857	1.76
PRP	Elmer Jamias	4,057	0.48
Independent	Onofre Abad	2,618	0.31
Total votes		845,729	100.00
Asenso hold			

=== 2019 ===
2019 Philippine House of Representatives election in the 2nd District of Manila
Party	Candidate	Votes	%
Asenso	Rolan Valeriano	34,861	36.52
Nacionalista	Alexander Lopez	32,215	33.75
NUP	Rodolfo "Ninong" Lacsamana	28,379	29.73
Total votes		95,455	100.00
Asenso gain from PDP–Laban			

Party political offices
First	Partido Federal ng Pilipinas nominee for Mayor of Manila; 2022	Succeeded by Raymond Bagatsing
