= 2013 Manila local elections =

16th Mayoral election in the City of Manila

2013 Manila mayoral election
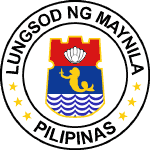
- May 13, 2013
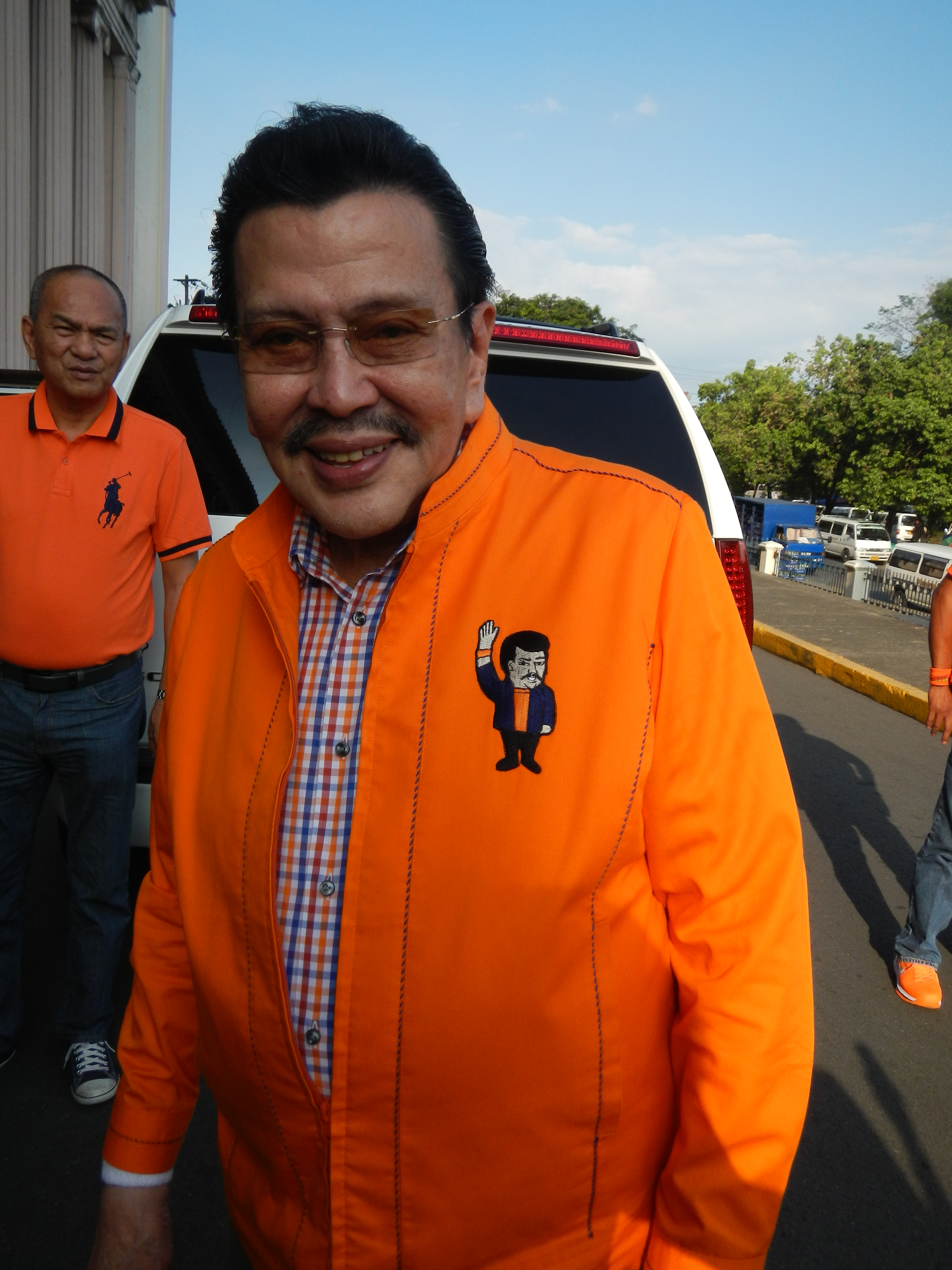

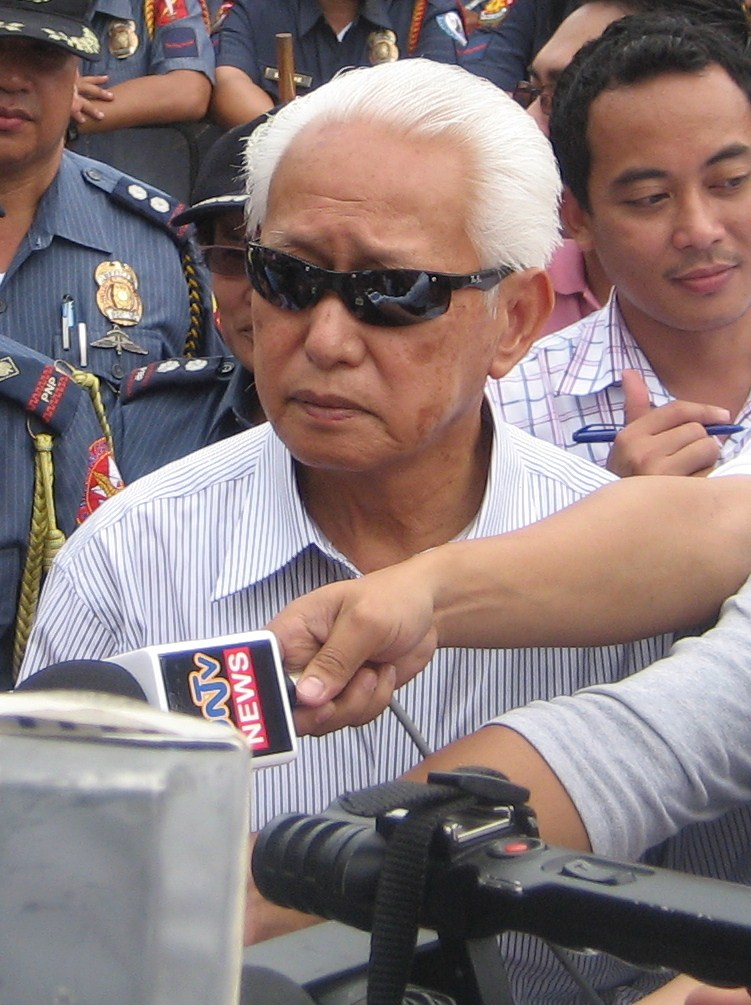
Nominee	Joseph Estrada	Alfredo Lim
Party	UNA	Liberal
Alliance	Asenso	KKK
Running mate	Isko Moreno	Lou Veloso
Popular vote	343,993	308,544
Percentage	52.72	47.28
Mayor before election
Alfredo Lim
Liberal
Elected mayor
Joseph Estrada
UNA
- Vice mayoral election
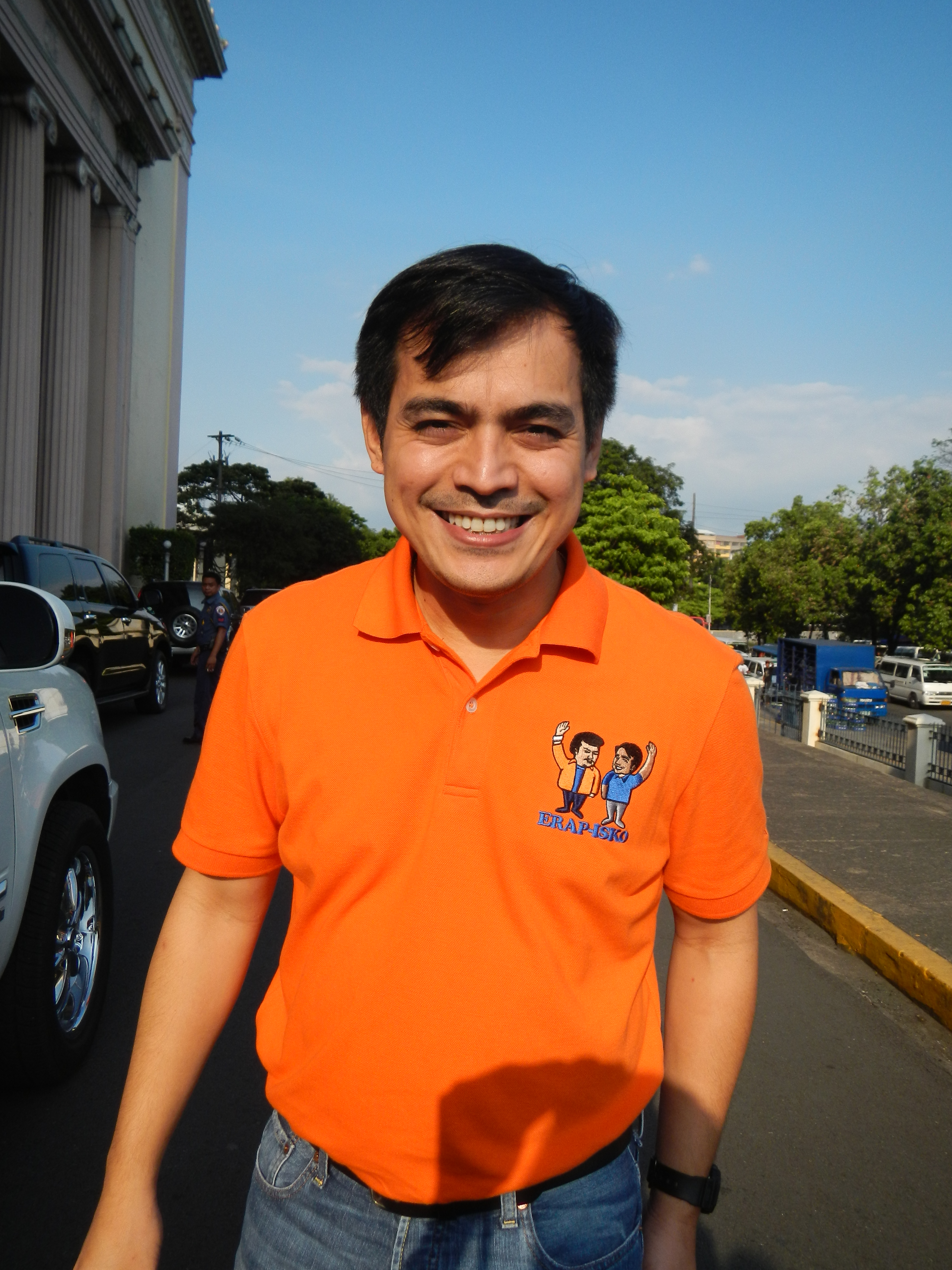

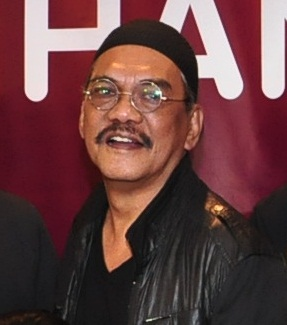
Candidate	Isko Moreno	Lou Veloso
Party	UNA	Liberal
Alliance	Asenso	KKK
Popular vote	395,156	234,256
Percentage	62.78	37.22
Vice Mayor before election
Isko Moreno
UNA
Elected Vice Mayor
Isko Moreno
UNA
- City Council election

36 of 38 seats in the Manila City Council 20 seats needed for a majority
	First party	Second party	Third party
Party	UNA	Liberal	Nacionalista
Alliance	Asenso	KKK
Last election	Party does not exist	9	12
Seats won	25	6	1
Seat change	▲25	▼3	▼11
Popular vote	1,592,479	866,047	94,890
Percentage	53.48%	29.09%	3.19%

Local elections were held in Manila on May 13, 2013, within the Philippine general election. The voters elected for the elective local posts in the city: the mayor, vice mayor, the six congressmen, and the councilors, six in each of the city's six legislative districts.

Mayor Alfredo Lim ran for the mayorship for the third consecutive time; if he won, he would have been prohibited to run in 2016 due to term limits. Lim's opponent was former senator, vice president, deposed president then convicted plunderer and defeated 2010 presidential candidate, Joseph Estrada, who was a longtime San Juan mayor; in order to run for the mayorship, Estrada had to transfer his residence from San Juan to Manila. The two formerly contested the presidency in 1998, with Estrada emerging victorious.

Estrada's running mate was Vice Mayor Isko Moreno, who has served since 2007; had he won, he would be term-limited in 2016. Actor and 6th District Councilor Lou Veloso was Lim's running mate; Veloso was the councilor elected with the highest percentage of votes in 2010.

== Mayoral and vice mayoral election ==
On May 4, 2012, Vice Mayor Isko Moreno joined the Pwersa ng Masang Pilipino party, fueling speculations that he would be former President Joseph Estrada's running mate. Estrada would confirm this on May 9, 2012, but, for one term only. On May 7, 2012, Incumbent Mayor Alfredo Lim announced he will run for re-election and said that Moreno was his original running mate.

A year prior to the election, Estrada transferred his residence from San Juan to Santa Mesa, Manila; this was made official by the Manila City Hall. Estrada's Manila home was formerly the headquarters of President Ramon Magsaysay during the 1953 presidential election.

On September 18, 2012, Lim announced that he has picked 6th District Councilor Lou Veloso to be his running mate. Lim noted that Veloso is the councilor that emerged with the most votes in the last local elections.

On October 1, 2012, during the first day of filing of certificate of candidacies, Lim and Veloso, along with their ticket's 36 city council bets, filed their certificate of candidacies at the Commission on Elections (COMELEC) field office in Arroceros, Manila. Lim is supported by all but one of the incumbent congressmen of Manila - Benjamin Asilo of the 1st District, Carlo Lopez of the 2nd District, Zenaida Angping of the 3rd District, Trisha Bonoan-David of the 4th District, and Sandy Ocampo of the 6th District. 5th District Representative Amado Bagatsing originally supported him but endorsed Estrada instead. Lim also said that his 2013 campaign will be his last as he intends to retire from politics in 2016. He had previously served as mayor from 1992 to 1998, Secretary of the Interior and Local Government under Estrada from 2000 to 2001, lost the mayorship to Estrada ally Lito Atienza in 2001, elected Senator in 2004 under the Estrada-backed Koalisyon ng Nagkakaisang Pilipino, and retook the mayorship from Atienza's son Ali in 2007, then successfully defending it against Atienza himself in 2010.

A day later, Estrada and Moreno filed their certificate of candidacies. Estrada left his home at Santa Mesa with Moreno aboard his jeepney he made famous during the 1998 presidential election. Estrada drove the jeepney to the COMELEC office at Arroceros; the United Nationalist Alliance-backed Estrada ticket includes 29 of the incumbent 36 councilors. The contest between Lim and Estrada has been billed by many as "Dirty Harry vs. Asiong Salonga", with Lim being previously referred to as "Dirty Harry", and Estrada having played Asiong Salonga in a movie.

Aside from Lim and Estrada, other candidates include Marino Magallanes, a fortune teller from Quiapo, mechanical engineer and perennial candidate Onofre Abad, lawyer Felix Cantal, Samuel Gabot, Rodolfo Lim and driver Fidel Cruz.

On January 7, 2013, the Sandiganbayan ruled to dismiss via technicality a petition disqualifying Estrada from running due to a condition from his pardon granted by President Gloria Macapagal Arroyo that said he would not seek elective office. However, he faced other disqualification cases from the same issue at the Commission on Elections and at the Regional Trial Court.

On January 16, the commission disqualified all of the mayoral candidates, save for Estrada and Lim, and declared them as "nuisance candidates."

The two camps signed a covenant for peaceful elections at the Manila Police District headquarters on February 15, 2013. Commission on Elections chairman Sixto Brillantes and Parish Pastoral Council for Responsible Voting chairman Henrietta de Villa witnessed the signing, which were also attended by the rest of the slates, including their running mates. A day later, the police arrested Moreno and five other UNA candidates for the city council for alleged illegal gambling. Estrada later said he may file charges against the police who arrested his running mate. The police arrested the group after they proceeded to hold a bingo game, which the police had said to be illegal, after promising they would hold a raffle instead. Moreno and the other candidates were freed after the Manila Prosecutor's Office ruled that there was not enough evidence to prolong their detention. Moreno maintained that the bingo game is not illegal after President Ferdinand Marcos classified it as a parlor game. Brillantes later said that Moreno's group did not violate any election law when they held a bingo game as the campaign period for local elections has not yet started.

The Manila Regional Trial Court dismissed another disqualification case against Estrada on March 4. Judge Marivic Umali heeded Estrada's lawyer Frank Chavez that the Commission on Elections and not the court had jurisdiction on the case. On April 1, the commission dismissed Estrada's last disqualification case.

== Opinion polling ==
=== Mayoral election ===
==== Three-candidate race ====
Pollster	Date(s) administered	Sample size	Margin of error	Lito Atienza	Joseph Estrada	Alfredo Lim
SWS	May 5–8, 2012	1,200	±3%	11%	46%	42%

==== Two-candidate race ====
Pollster	Date(s) administered	Sample size	Margin of error	Joseph Estrada	Alfredo Lim
SWS	May 5–8, 2012	1,200	±3%	53%	45%

== Results ==
=== Mayoral election ===
Parties are as stated in their certificate of candidacies.

Manila Mayoral election
Party	Candidate	Votes	%
UNA	Joseph Estrada	343,993	52.72
Liberal	Alfredo Lim (incumbent)	308,544	47.28
Total votes		652,537	100.00
UNA gain from Liberal			

=== Vice Mayoral election ===
Parties are as stated in their certificate of candidacies.

Manila Mayoral election
Party	Candidate	Votes	%
UNA	Isko Moreno (incumbent)	395,156	62.78
Liberal	Lou Veloso	234,256	37.22
Total votes		629,412	100.00
UNA hold			

=== House of Representatives elections ===
==== 1st District ====
Benjamin Asilo is the incumbent.

2013 Philippine House of Representatives election at Manila's 1st district
Party	Candidate	Votes	%
Liberal	Benjamin Asilo	82,579	63.61
UNA	Ernesto Dionisio, Sr.	44,420	34.22
Independent	Fernando Diaz	2,243	1.73
Independent	Ricardo Bacolod	573	0.44
Total votes		129,815	100.00
Liberal hold			

==== 2nd District ====
Carlo Lopez is the incumbent.

2013 Philippine House of Representatives election at Manila's 2nd district
Party	Candidate	Votes	%
Liberal	Carlo Lopez	55,468	68.82
UNA	Edward Tan	25,128	31.18
Total votes		80,596	100.00
Liberal hold			

==== 3rd District ====
Zenaida Angping is the incumbent. She is a common candidate of the LP-KKK and UNA tickets.

The Commission on Elections disqualified James Jaime Marquez Tan from the election for being a "nuisance candidate".

2013 Philippine House of Representatives election at Manila's 3rd district
Party	Candidate	Votes	%
NPC	Zenaida Angping	50,466	62.18
KKK	Ramon Morales	29,606	36.48
Independent	Alex Garcia	1,091	1.34
Total votes		81,163	100.00
NPC hold			

==== 4th District ====
Incumbent Trisha Bonoan-David is running unopposed. Like Zenaida Angping, she is also a common candidate of LP-KKK and UNA.

2013 Philippine House of Representatives election at Manila's 4th district
Party	Candidate	Votes	%
NUP	Trisha Bonoan-David	78,026	100.00
Total votes		78,026	100.00
NUP hold			

==== 5th District ====
Amado Bagatsing is the incumbent.

2013 Philippine House of Representatives election at Manila's 5th district
Party	Candidate	Votes	%
KABAKA	Amado Bagatsing	94,966	89.05
NPC	Faith Maganto	10,380	9.73
KBL	Mario Cayabyab	1,293	1.21
Total votes		106,639	100.00
KABAKA hold			

==== 6th District ====
Rosenda Ocampo is the incumbent and her main opponent is former Congressman Benny Abante.

2013 Philippine House of Representatives election at Manila's 6th district
Party	Candidate	Votes	%
Liberal	Rosenda Ocampo	43,667	51.45
UNA	Benny Abante	40,571	47.80
Independent	Richard Bautista	407	0.48
Independent	Francisco Candaza	225	0.27
Total votes		84,870	100.00
Liberal hold			

=== City Council elections ===
Each of Manila's six legislative districts sends six councilors to the City Council. The election is via plurality-at-large voting: A voter can vote up to six candidates; the six candidates with the highest number of votes in a particular district are elected.

In addition, the barangay captains and the Sangguniang Kabataan (SK) chairpersons in the city's barangays (communities) elect amongst themselves a president that will seat as an ex officio member of the city council with full voting powers. The presidents of the barangay captains and SK chairpersons that were elected after the 2010 barangay elections will serve until the winners of the 2013 barangay elections are seated in late November.

In case of a tie vote, the vice mayor, as the presiding officer, will vote to break the tie.

==== Summary ====
Party	Votes	%	Seats
United Nationalist Alliance	1,592,479	53.48	25
Liberal	866,047	29.09	6
Nacionalista	94,890	3.19	1
Kabalikat ng Bayan sa Kaunlaran	70,529	2.37	1
Democratic Party of the Philippines	10,600	0.36	0
Kapayapaan, Kaunlaran at Katarungan	4,860	0.16	0
Kilusang Bagong Lipunan	1,563	0.05	0
Asenso Manileño	1,467	0.05	0
Independent	335,011	11.25	3
Ex officio seats			2
Total	2,977,446	100.00	38

==== 1st District ====
It is composed of Tondo.

2013 Manila City Council election at the 1st district
Party	Candidate	Votes	%
UNA	Ernesto Dionisio, Jr.	76,946	12.05
UNA	Erick Ian "Banzai" Nieva	70,925	11.10
Liberal	Roberto Asilo	60,623	9.49
Liberal	Niño Dela Cruz	59,768	9.36
UNA	Dennis Alcoreza	59,309	9.29
UNA	Irma Alfonso	54,619	8.55
UNA	Jesus Fajardo	51,821	8.11
Liberal	Moises "Bobby" Lim	46,043	7.21
UNA	Arlene Koa	35,874	5.62
Independent	Cristina "Cristy Lim" Lim-Raymundo	34,379	5.38
Liberal	Rolando Sy	33,908	5.31
Liberal	Joey Venancio	24,915	3.90
Liberal	Silvestre Dumagat, Jr.	14,534	2.28
Independent	Ferdinand Sandoval	5,462	0.86
Independent	Rejercito Aranas	3,314	0.52
DPP	Roberto Garrate	2,028	0.32
Independent	Eduardo Lanuza	1,237	0.19
Independent	Crispin Balbeja	1,113	0.17
Independent	Joey Longanilla	1,099	0.17
Independent	Alden Obejas	814	0.13

Raffy Jimenez Crespo, son of former representative Mark Jimenez, was disqualified from this election.

Cristy Lim is a guest candidate of the LP-KKK coalition.

==== 2nd District ====
Gagalangin area which is also part of Tondo.

2013 Manila City Council election at the 2nd district
Party	Candidate	Votes	%
UNA	Rolando Valeriano	46,600	12.61
UNA	Ruben "Dr. J" Buenaventura	44,984	12.17
UNA	Marlon Lacson	44,282	11.98
UNA	Ramon Robles	41,532	11.24
Liberal	Rodolfo "Ninong" Lacsamana	37,365	10.11
UNA	Numero "Uno" Lim	35,674	9.65
Liberal	Ivy Varona	24,059	6.51
Liberal	Ruben "RP" Bunag	20,661	5.59
Liberal	Renato "Gulay" Torno, Jr.	19,708	5.33
UNA	Filomena "Len Viceo" Aligayo	18,851	5.10
Liberal	Fernando Lopez	13,377	3.62
Liberal	Ma. Corazon Panlilio	12,060	3.26
Independent	Ariel Fernandez	6,773	1.83
Independent	Pedro Buluran, Jr.	1,980	0.54
DPP	Renato del Rosario	1,755	0.47

==== 3rd District ====
It composed of Binondo, Quiapo, San Nicolas and Santa Cruz

2013 Manila City Council election at the 3rd district
Party	Candidate	Votes	%
UNA	John Marvin "Yul Servo" Nieto	61,028	
UNA	Ma. Asuncion "Re" Fugoso	56,920	
UNA	Joel Chua	51,603	
UNA	Bernardito Ang	50,218	
UNA	Ernesto Isip, Jr.	50,107	
UNA	Manuel Zarcal	47,448	
Liberal	Thelma Lim	38,396	
Liberal	Ma. Victoria Barbers	19,756	
Liberal	William Lising	14,304	
Liberal	Severino Reyes	10,666	
Liberal	Jackson Dechaves	7,371	
Liberal	Jesus Abejar	7,283	
DPP	Rosalinda Sia	5,446	
Independent	Martin Domingo	3,945	
Independent	Anthony de Guzman	3,504	
Independent	Alberto Chico	2,777	

==== 4th District ====
It is situated in Sampaloc. No. 6 Arlene Chua's term was cut short because of citizenship issues and was declared ineligible for office by COMELEC. 7th placer Krystle Bacani assumed office on March 17, 2015.

2013 Manila City Council election at the 4th district
Party	Candidate	Votes	%
Independent	Science Reyes	47,179	
UNA	Edward Maceda	43,661	
UNA	Don Juan "DJ" Bagatsing	41,926	
UNA	Jocelyn Quintos	40,214	
Liberal	Anton Capistrano	40,117	
UNA	Arlene Chua (disqualified)	38,165	
Liberal	Krystle Bacani	36,799	
UNA	Arnold "Doc Poks" Pangan	34,160	
Liberal	Guia Gomez Castro	31,592	
Nacionalista	Gina Perez	30,177	
Liberal	Eduardo Quintos XVI	26,111	
Liberal	Eldorado Lim	22,839	
UNA	Joel "JTV" Villanueva	19,065	
Liberal	Gerardo Gamez	18,339	
Independent	Amalia Tolentino	14,135	
Independent	Alexander Lim	2,233	
Independent	Antonio Abana	2,181	
Independent	Vicente Salgado	1,648	
Independent	Frederick Constantino	1,437	

==== 5th District ====
2013 Manila City Council election at the 5th district
Party	Candidate	Votes	%
KABAKA	Ali Atienza	70,529	
Nacionalista	Joey Hizon III	64,713	
Liberal	Josefina Siscar	56,574	
UNA	Raymundo Yupangco	55,418	
UNA	Cristina Isip	55,015	
UNA	Roberto Ortega, Jr.	54,709	
UNA	Richard Ibay	49,077	
UNA	Rafael Borromeo	42,693	
UNA	Roderick Valbuena	35,430	
Liberal	Francis Villegas	15,636	
Liberal	Jaime Co, Jr.	15,558	
Independent	Felix Tobillo, Jr.	11,504	
Liberal	Geoffrey "Jograd" dela Torre	11,365	
Liberal	Saminodin Manshawie	7,612	
Liberal	Fernando Perito	4,421	
Independent	Reginaldo Capili	3,581	
Independent	Jaime Adriano	3,452	
Independent	Eva Cantilang	2,733	
Independent	Darwin Borca	1,580	
KBL	Marlon Villarojas	1,563	
Independent	Wilfredo Vida	1,414	
DPP	Jose Antonio Dimaano	1,371	

==== 6th District ====
2013 Manila City Council election at the 6th district
Party	Candidate	Votes	%
UNA	Priscilla Marie Abante	48,372	
UNA	Casimiro Sison	45,985	
UNA	Elizabeth Rivera	44,001	
UNA	Joel Par	42,576	
UNA	Leilani Marie Lacuna	41,141	
Liberal	Christian Paul Uy	39,968	
UNA	Carlos Castañeda	39,334	
UNA	Jocelyn Dawis-Asuncion	32,711	
PDP–Laban	Ma. Lourdes "Bonjay" Isip-Garcia	29,278	
Liberal	Pablo Dario Ocampo IV	26,439	
UNA	Jason Roland Valdez	20,367	
Liberal	Richard Lontoc	16,280	
Liberal	Dionisio Cuevas II	12,219	
Liberal	Jimmy Tiu	11,902	
Independent	Julio Logarta, Jr.	8,821	
Liberal	Romualdo Billanes	7,479	
KKK	Regina Aspiras	4,860	
Independent	Valeriano Reloj	3,137	
Independent	Edward Quintos	2,786	
Asenso	George Planas	1,467	
Independent	Segundina Jamias	1,233	

Joel Par is a guest candidate of UNA.
