= Rolan Valeriano =

Filipino politician

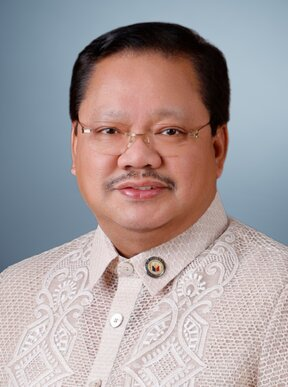
- Official portrait, 2026

Member of the Philippine House of Representatives from Manila's 2nd congressional district
- Incumbent
- Assumed office June 30, 2019
- Preceded by: Carlo Lopez

Member of the Manila City Council from the 2nd district
- In office June 30, 2013 – June 30, 2019
- In office June 30, 2004 – June 30, 2010

Personal details
- Born: Rolando Mayodato Valeriano; December 11, 1964 (age 61) Manila, Philippines
- Party: NUP (since 2021); Asenso Manileño (local party; 2015–2026)
- Other political affiliations: UNA (2012–2021); Nacionalista (2009–2012); NPC (2004–2007); Lakas (2001–2004, 2007–2009)
- Education: Rizal Elementary School; Lakandula High School
- Occupation: Politician, customs broker

Rolando Mayodato Valeriano (born December 11, 1964), also known as Rolan Valeriano or Rolan CRV, is a Filipino politician serving as the representative of the 2nd District of Manila in the House of Representatives since 2019. He previously served as a city councilor of Manila from 2004 to 2010 and again from 2013 to 2019. In September 2024, Valeriano gave a privilege speech that became the basis for the congressional inquiry into the budget utilization of the Office of the Vice President of the Philippines under Sara Duterte.

== Early life and education ==
Valeriano was born in Manila on December 11, 1964. He studied at Rizal Elementary School for his primary education and graduated from Lakandula High School for his secondary education. He later became a licensed customs broker.

== Political career ==
Valeriano began his political career as candidate for councilor of Manila from the 2nd district in 2001. He then served as councilor from 2004 to 2010. He ran for the congressional seat of Manila’s 2nd district in 2010 but lost to fellow councilor Carlo Lopez.

He returned as councilor from 2013 to 2019, serving for two more terms. In the 2019 elections, Valeriano won the congressional seat for Manila’s 2nd District, defeating Congressman Carlo Lopez's cousin, Alex Lopez and Councilor Rodolfo Lacsamana. He was re-elected in 2022 and in 2025, defeating his previous rival Carlo Lopez in both instances.

=== Legislation ===
Among the bills authored or supported by Valeriano are:

- Upgrading benefits for military veterans and their dependents
- Postponement of the 2022 barangay elections
- Establishment of the Maharlika Investment Fund

He voted against the franchise renewal of ABS-CBN in 2020 and against the absolute divorce bill in 2024.

== Controversy ==
In 2007, the Presidential Anti-Smuggling Group recommended to the Department of Justice the filing of charges against Valeriano and 11 other individuals in connection with alleged oil smuggling at the Subic Bay Freeport Zone. He was linked to Trail Blazer Integrated Brokerage Corporation, one of the implicated companies.

=== Controversy with Isko Moreno ===
In November 2024, Valeriano challenged his erstwhile ally, former Manila mayor Isko Moreno Domagoso, to undergo a lie detector test following the release of a video where Domagoso accused him and Manila 3rd District Representative Joel Chua of treating him badly during a private meeting. Domagoso, who left Asenso Manileño, claimed that Valeriano and Chua allegedly told him that they would prefer giving the mayoral post to another candidate rather than to him.

Valeriano and Chua denied the allegations, stating that no such confrontation happened and that they parted ways with Domagoso amicably, even addressing him as "boss." Both congressmen are known allies of Manila Mayor Honey Lacuna, which they suggested may have prompted Domagoso to attack them politically. Valeriano further criticized Domagoso for plunging Manila into ₱17.8 billion in debt and for abandoning the city when he ran for president in 2022 despite having been eligible to seek re-election for mayor.

== Electoral history ==
Electoral history of Rolan Valeriano
Year	Office	Party		Votes received				Result
Year	Office	Local	National	Total	%	P.	Swing	Result
2001	Councilor (Manila–2nd district)	—N/a	Lakas	15,894	—N/a	11th	—N/a	Lost
2004	Councilor (Manila–2nd district)	—N/a	NPC	51,171	—N/a	3rd	—N/a	Won
2007	Councilor (Manila–2nd district)	—N/a	Lakas	49,907	—N/a	2nd	—N/a	Won
2013	Councilor (Manila–2nd district)	—N/a	UNA	46,600	12.61%	1st	—N/a	Won
2016	Councilor (Manila–2nd district)	Asenso	UNA	53,986	10.95%	1st	—N/a	Won
2010	Representative (Manila–2nd district)	—N/a	Nacionalista	37,141	43.21%	2nd	—N/a	Lost
2019	Representative (Manila–2nd district)	Asenso	UNA	34,861	36.52%	1st	—N/a	Won
2022	Representative (Manila–2nd district)	Asenso	NUP	70,146	62.11%	1st	—N/a	Won
2025	Representative (Manila–2nd district)	Asenso	NUP	59,865	52.74%	1st	—N/a	Won
