= Ernix Dionisio =

Filipino politician (born 1978)

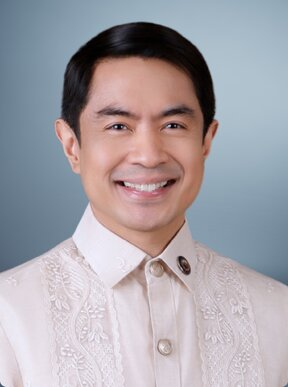
- Official portrait, 2026

Deputy Majority Leader of the House of Representatives of the Philippines
- Incumbent
- Assumed office July 29, 2025 Serving with several others
- Leader: Sandro Marcos

Member of the Philippine House of Representatives from Manila's 1st congressional district
- Incumbent
- Assumed office June 30, 2022
- Preceded by: Manny Lopez

Member of the Manila City Council from the 1st district
- In office June 30, 2007 – June 30, 2016

Personal details
- Born: Ernesto Mijares Dionisio Jr. May 22, 1978 (age 48) Tondo, Manila, Philippines
- Party: NUP (2026–present)
- Other political affiliations: Lakas (2022–2026); Aksyon (2021–2022); UNA (2012–2016); Asenso Manileño (2007–2024); Liberal (2007–2012)
- Parent(s): Ernesto G. Dionisio, Sr. (father)
- Occupation: Politician
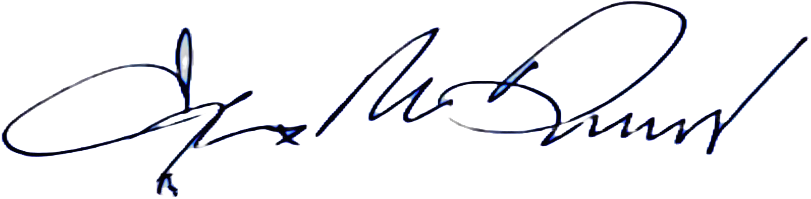
- Signature

Ernesto "Ernix" Mijares Dionisio Jr. (born May 22, 1978), is a Filipino politician currently serving as the representative of Manila's 1st district since 2022 and a former city councilor from 2007 until 2016.

Dionisio, the son of former councilor and city administrator Ernesto Dionisio Sr.

== Political career ==
=== Manila City Council (2007–2016) ===
Dionisio was served as three-term councilor from 2007 to 2016.

=== 2016 House of Representatives bid ===
Upon being term-limited, he ran for the congressional seat in Manila's 1st district in 2016 under Asenso Manileño but lost to Manny Lopez of the NPC.

=== House of Representatives (2022–present) ===
In 2022, he ran under Asenso Manileño for the congressional seat in Manila's 1st district and won, unseating Manny Lopez, who had transferred to the Duterte-backed PDP–Laban. Prior to the start of the 19th Congress, he joined Lakas–CMD. He was later named as an assistant majority floor leader in the House of Representatives. In 2024, while at Congress, he was named as one of the top NCR-based performing representatives in the House of Representatives in the year's second quarter survey and placed third.

In 2024, he left the Asenso Manileño party and eventually backed Isko Moreno's bid for a mayoral comeback in 2025. He remained with Lakas–CMD despite the entry of Asenso Manileño's leader, Manila Mayor Honey Lacuna, who ran against Moreno. Dionisio was re-elected to his second term in 2025.

In 2026, during the 20th Congress, he joined the National Unity Party (NUP).

== Electoral history ==
Electoral history of Ernix Dionisio
| Year | Office | Party | | Votes received | | | | Result |
| Year | Office | Local | National | Total | % | P. | Swing | Result |
|---|---|---|---|---|---|---|---|---|
| 2007 | Councilor (1st district) | Asenso | Liberal | 56,244 | | 1st | —N/a | Won |
| 2010 | Councilor (1st district) | Asenso | Liberal | 88,334 | 11.39 | 1st | —N/a | Won |
| 2013 | Councilor (1st district) | Asenso | UNA | 76,946 | 12.05 | 1st | +0.66 | Won |
| 2016 | Representative (Manila–1st) | Asenso | UNA | 42,878 | 27.25 | 3rd | —N/a | Lost |
| 2022 | Representative (Manila–1st) | Asenso | Aksyon | 88,327 | 44.66 | 1st | +17.41 | Won |
| 2025 | Representative (Manila–1st) | —N/a | Lakas | 109,838 | 51.15 | 1st | +6.49 | Won |
