= Carlo Lopez =

Filipino politician (born 1965)

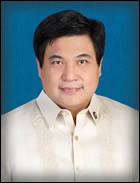
- Official portrait during the 16th Congress of the Philippines

Member of the Philippine House of Representatives from Manila's 2nd congressional district
- In office June 30, 2010 – June 30, 2019
- Preceded by: Jaime C. Lopez
- Succeeded by: Rolando M. Valeriano

Member of the Manila City Council from the 2nd district
- In office June 30, 2007 – June 30, 2010

Personal details
- Born: Carlo Vincent Villongco Lopez; January 5, 1965 (age 61) Quezon City, Philippines
- Party: Nacionalista (since 2021) (Note: Even though he sworn as a member of Aksyon Demokratiko, he still registered on his certificate of candidacy under Nacionalista); Aksyon (2024–present)
- Other political affiliations: Lakas (2007–2009); Liberal (2009–2016); PDP–Laban (2016–2021)
- Spouse: Margareth Lopez
- Relatives: Mel Lopez (uncle); Manny Lopez (cousin); Alex Lopez (cousin)
- Profession: Politician

Carlo Vincent Villongco Lopez (born January 5, 1965), is a Filipino politician who has served as the representative for Manila's 2nd district from 2010 to 2019.

== Political career ==
Lopez served as 2nd district councilor from 2007 until 2010. He served as representative of the same district to the House of Representatives for three terms from 2010 to 2019. Lopez's notable laws proposed in the Congress was to require the Department of Public Works and Highways to finish the road they had already started. His term ended in 2019, when he became term-limited.

Lopez sought for a congressional comeback for the same district in 2022 under his cousin and mayoral candidate Alex Lopez's local ticket, but lost to incumbent Rolan Valeriano. In 2024, he coalesced with former Mayor Isko Moreno under the slate dubbed Yorme's Choice aiming to reclaim his former congressional post in 2025. However, he lost once again to Valeriano.

== Electoral history ==
Electoral history of Carlo Lopez
Year	Office	Party	Votes received				Result
Year	Office	Party	Total	%	P.	Swing	Result
2007	Councilor (Manila–2nd district)	Lakas	39,839	—N/a	6th	—N/a	Won
2010	Representative (Manila–2nd district)	Liberal	47,710	55.51%	1st	—N/a	Won
2013	Representative (Manila–2nd district)	Liberal	55,468	68.82%	1st	+13.31%	Won
2016	Representative (Manila–2nd district)	Liberal	46,353	100%	1st	+31.18%	Unopposed
2022	Representative (Manila–2nd district)	Nacionalista	42,787	37.89%	2nd	-62.11%	Lost
2025	Representative (Manila–2nd district)	Nacionalista	53,650	47.26%	2nd	+9.37%	Lost

== Personal life ==
Lopez is a cousin of former Manila 1st district congressman Manny Lopez, and former mayoral candidate Alex Lopez.
