= Kabalikat ng Bayan sa Kaunlaran =

Filipino political party based in Manila

- Leader: Amado Bagatsing
- Founder: Amado Bagatsing
- Founded: 1985
- Headquarters: Manila
- Ideology: Localism
- National affiliation: Aksyon (2024–present); TroPa (2022); NUP (2011–2022); PPC (2001); LDP (1987–2000)
- Colors: Green

The Kabalikat ng Bayan Sa Kaunlaran (KABAKA) is a local Manila-based political organization.

== History ==
In 2001, KABAKA was the political party of Amado Bagatsing when he ran for the Mayorship of Manila. KABAKA was affiliated with the People Power Coalition (PPC), as Bagatsing was chosen by the Arroyo administration over Lakas Manila leader Mel Lopez. Bagatsing ran with incumbent Vice Mayor Danny Lacuna as his running mate. Bagasting lost to incumbent Lito Atienza and Lacuna managed to win.

In 2007, the party supported his former mayoral opponent's son Ali, but lost to Alfredo Lim. Bagatsing returned to congress in 2007. In 2010, they supported his former opponent. In 2013, they supported former president Joseph Estrada.

In 2016, Bagatsing tried again to run for mayor, with Ali Atienza as running mate, but both lost to Estrada and daughter of Bagatsing's former running mate Honey Lacuna. At the same year, Cristal Bagatsing, his daughter ran to replace Bagatsing's place and won.

In 2019, Bagatsing was chosen by Estrada as his running mate (vice mayor) for seeking third term, but lost again to former Vice Mayor Isko Moreno and incumbent one Lacuna.

The Commission on Elections declared KABAKA as the dominant local party in Metro Manila for the 2022 election. In 2022, Bagatsing ran again for Mayor, this time without a running mate, and defeated by Lacuna. Cristal Bagatsing lost her bid for a third term after defeated by Irwin Tieng.

In 2025, Amado Bagatsing ran as congressman under Isko Moreno and Chi Atienza's slate. The party also supported the tandem. However, Bagatsing lost to incumbent Irwin Tieng.

== Electoral performance ==
=== Mayoral and Vice Mayoral elections ===
Year	Mayoral election				Vice mayoral election			
Year	Candidate	Votes	Vote share	Result	Candidate	Votes	Vote share	Result
2001	Amado Bagatsing	127,394	21.88%	Lost	Danny Lacuna	327,513		Won
2004	None			—N/a	None			—N/a
2007	None (Note: Bagatsing's supported Arnold "Ali" Atienza of Lakas–CMD)			—N/a	None			—N/a
2010	None (Note: Bagatsing's supported Lito Atienza of Lakas–CMD)			—N/a	None			—N/a
2013	None (Note: Bagatsing's supported Joseph Estrada of United Nationalist Alliance)			—N/a	None			—N/a
2016	Amado Bagatsing	167,829	22.84%	Lost	None (Note: Bagatsing's running mate was Arnold "Ali" Atienza of United Nationalist Alliance)			—N/a
2019	None (Note: Bagatsing's running mate was Joseph Estrada of Pwersa ng Masang Pilipino)			—N/a	Amado Bagatsing	267,286	38.78%	Lost
2022	Amado Bagatsing	118,694	14.03%	Lost	N/A			—N/a
2025	None (Note: Supported Isko Moreno of Aksyon–Yorme's Choice who won)			—N/a	None (Note: Supported Chi Atienza of Aksyon–Yorme's Choice who won)			—N/a

=== Legislative elections ===
City Council					House of Representatives districts in Manila		
Year	Votes	Votes share	Seats won	Result	Year	Seats won	Result
2007 (Note: Did not field candidates)			0 / 38	—N/a	2007	1 / 6	Joined Majority
2010	Did not participate		0 / 38	—N/a	2010	1 / 6	Joined Majority
2013	70,529	2.37%	1 / 38	Lost	2013	1 / 6	Joined Majority
2016	386,218	10.57%	1 / 38	Lost	2016	1 / 6	Joined Majority
2019	98,000	2.97%	1 / 38	Lost	2019	1 / 6	Joined Majority
2022	35,909	0.83%	0 / 38	Lost	2022	0 / 6	Lost
2025	Did not participate		0 / 38	—N/a	2025	0 / 6	Lost

=== Party-list elections ===
Year	Votes	%	Seats
2022	57,692	0.16%	0
