= Elmer Jamias =

Filipino police officer

Honourable Elmer M. Jamias
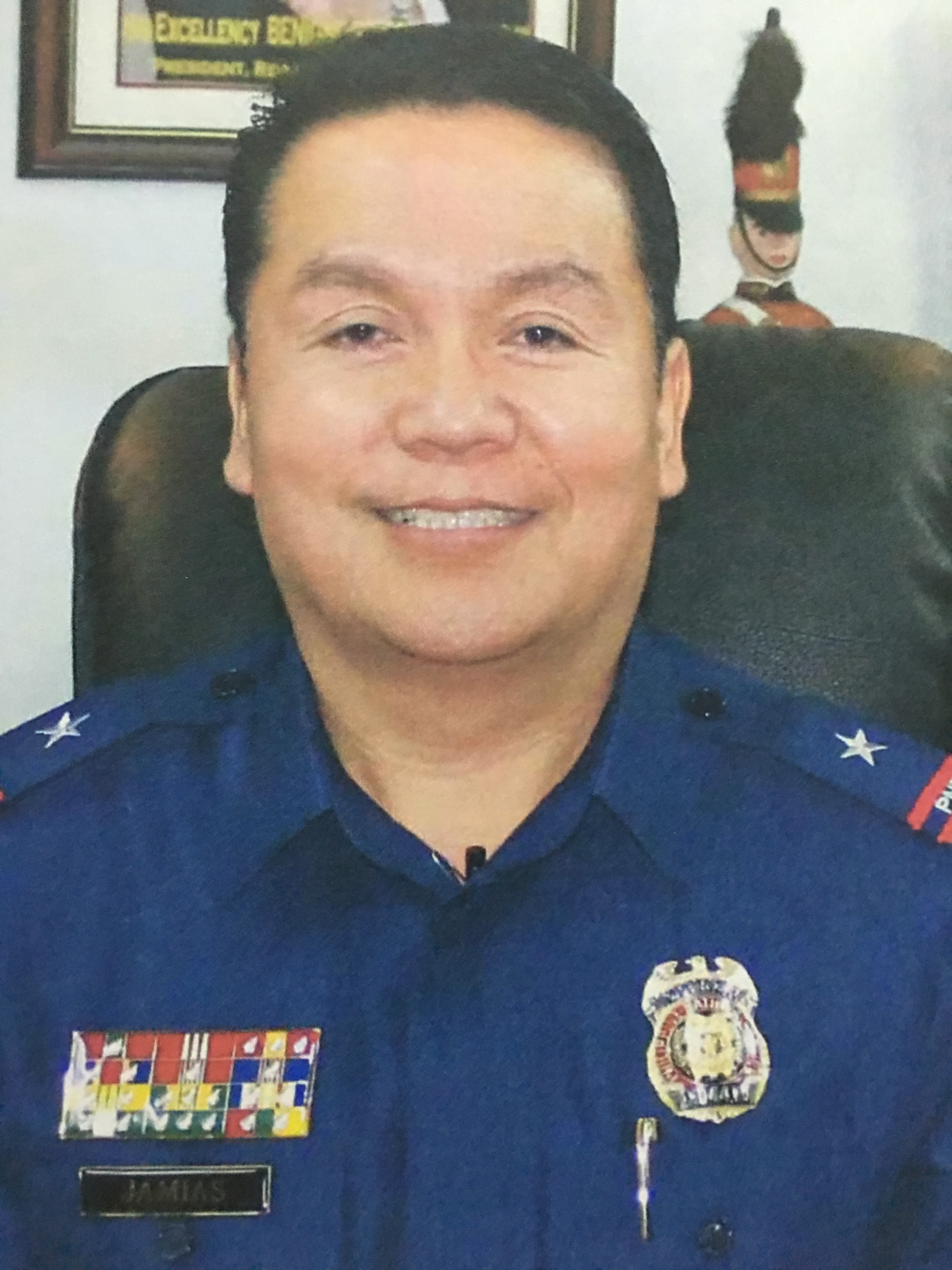

Deputy Director of the DICTM Philippine National Police
- In office June 14, 2017 – November 21, 2018
- President: Rodrigo Duterte
- Preceded by: Ricardo DC Zapata Jr.

Personal details
- Born: Elmer Mejorada Jamias; November 21, 1961 (age 64) Paco, Manila
- Party: People's Reform Party (2021–present); Independent (2018–2021)
- Education: Wesleyan University; Philippine College of Criminology; Philippine National Police Academy
- Police career
- Service: Philippine National Police
- Allegiance: Philippines
- Divisions: National Capital Region Police Office; Eastern Police District
- Rank: Police Chief Superintendent

Elmer Mejorada Jamias (born November 21, 1961) also known as Barako ng Maynila (fearless / tough guy of Manila), is a retired Filipino police officer. He previously served as Deputy Director of the Directorate of Information and Communication Technology Management from 2017 to 2018.

== Law enforcement career ==
Jamias graduated with the Philippine National Police Academy Class of 1986. In 1999, Jamias killed a criminal named Mike Ampuan, aka Macmod, responsible for the murders of six police officers; for this, he was later given the "Bayaning Pulis" (People's Police) award, which came with a reward of 100,000 Philippine pesos (1960 US$). Also in 1999, Jamias was among the recipients of that year's Outstanding Manilan Award.

In June 2015, Jamias was involved in a confrontation with Vice President Jejomar Binay over Binay's son's access to Makati City Hall, during which Binay allegedly assaulted Jamias and other law enforcement officers at the scene. In August 2015, Jamias was made director of Manila's Eastern Police District (EPD); Jamias denied suggestions that the new post was a reward for his involvement in the confrontation with Vice President Binay several weeks earlier. On June 14, 2017, Jamias was made Deputy Director of the Directorate of Information and Communication Technology Management.

== Politics ==
In October 2018, Jamias filed his candidacy for the vice-mayoralty of the city of Manila in the 2019 elections. He ran as an independent, and finished third in the results (13,876 votes) behind re-elected Vice-Mayor Maria Sheilah "Honey" Lacuna-Pangan and ex-congressman Amado Bagatsing.

== In popular culture ==
In 2000, Jamias was the subject of a film, Barako ng Maynila, (fearless / tough guy of Manila) inspired by his law enforcement career; Jamias was portrayed by Jinggoy Estrada, son of then-Philippine president Joseph Estrada, and the film was directed by Toto Natividad.

In 1994 film Pangako ng Kahapon, he played as Police Captain Bautista.

Jamias was also the subject of an eponymous series for the True Confessions literary column on Pilipino Star Ngayon. The series, written by Ronnie M. Halos, ran from 2003 to 2004 and is still available online.
