= Bagatsing =

Bagatsing is a Filipino surname of Indian origin (from Bhagat Singh). Notable people with the surname include:

- Hyram Bagatsing (born 1985), Filipino basketball player
- Ramon Bagatsing (1916–2006), Filipino politician
- Ramon Bagatsing Jr. (born 1950), Filipino politician and diplomat
- Raymond Bagatsing (born 1967), Filipino actor and model
- RK Bagatsing (born 1980), Filipino actor and model
