= 1992 Manila local elections =

9th Mayoral election in the City of Manila

1992 Manila mayoral election
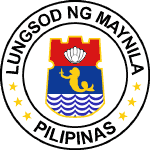
- May 11, 1992
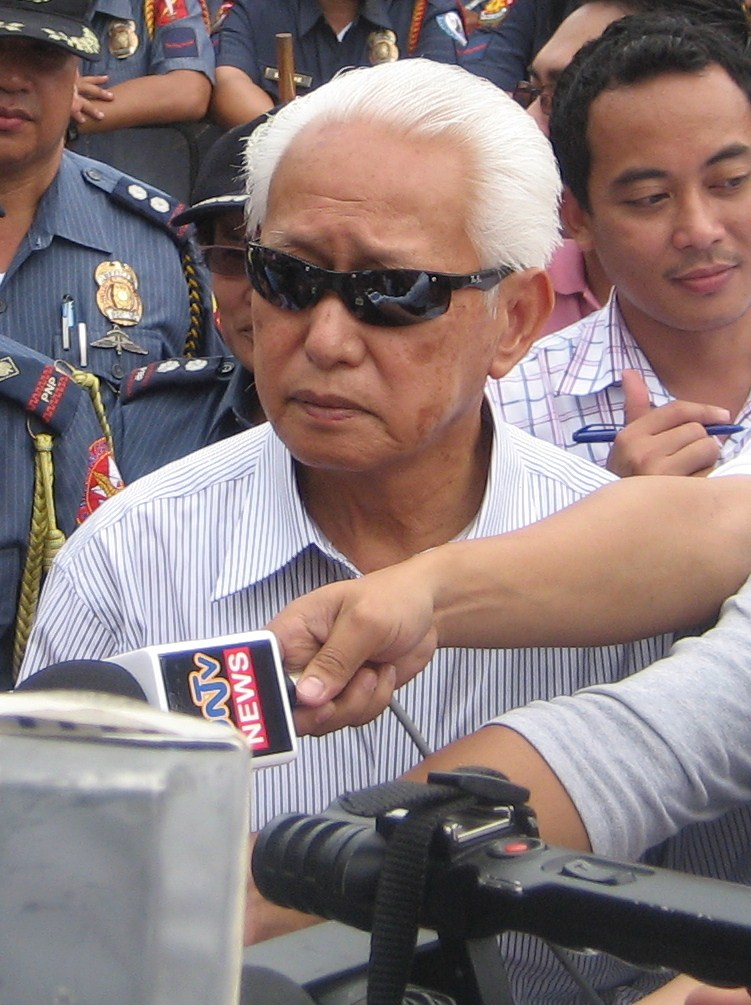

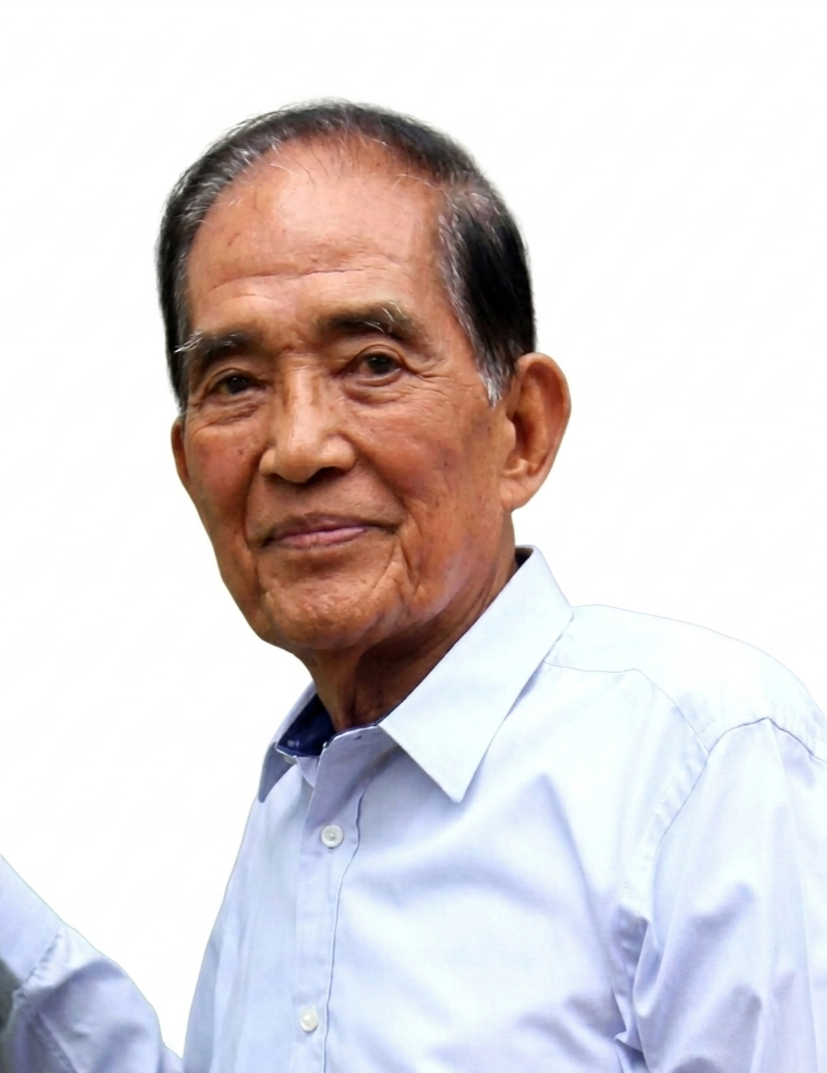

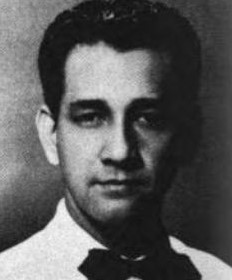

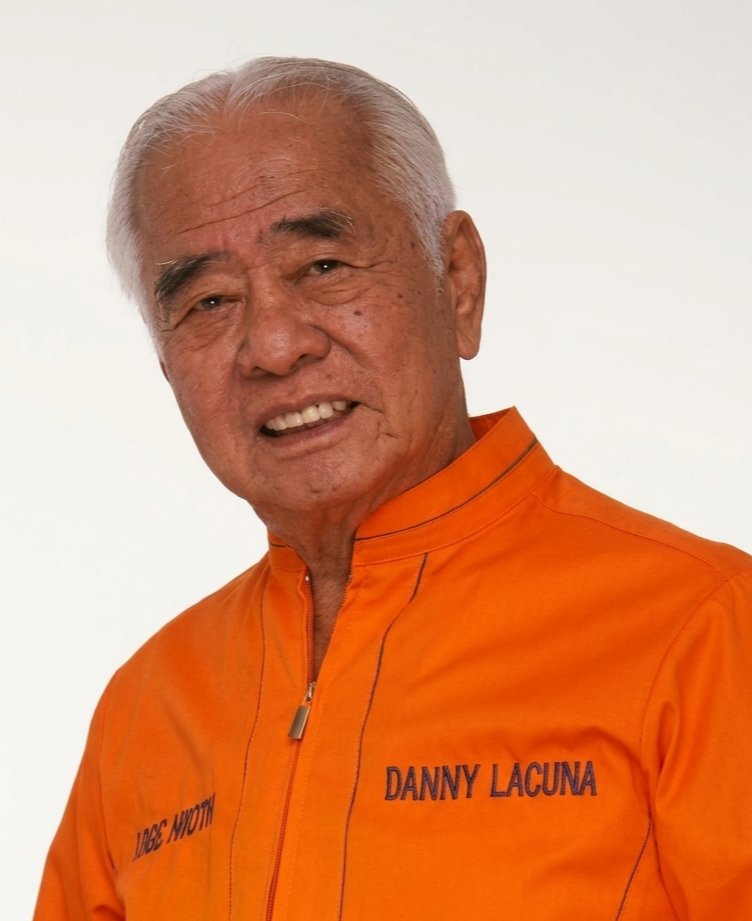
Candidate	Alfredo Lim	Mel Lopez	Ramon Bagatsing
Party	PRP	Lakas	LDP
Running mate	Lito Atienza	Jaime de la Rosa	Antonio Evangelista
Popular vote	226,403	172,695	135,069
Percentage	31.54	24.06	18.82
Candidate	Danny Lacuna
Party	PDP–Laban
Running mate	Abraham Cabochan
Popular vote	105,058
Percentage	14.64
Mayor before election
Mel Lopez
Lakas
Elected mayor
Alfredo Lim
PRP
- Vice mayoral election
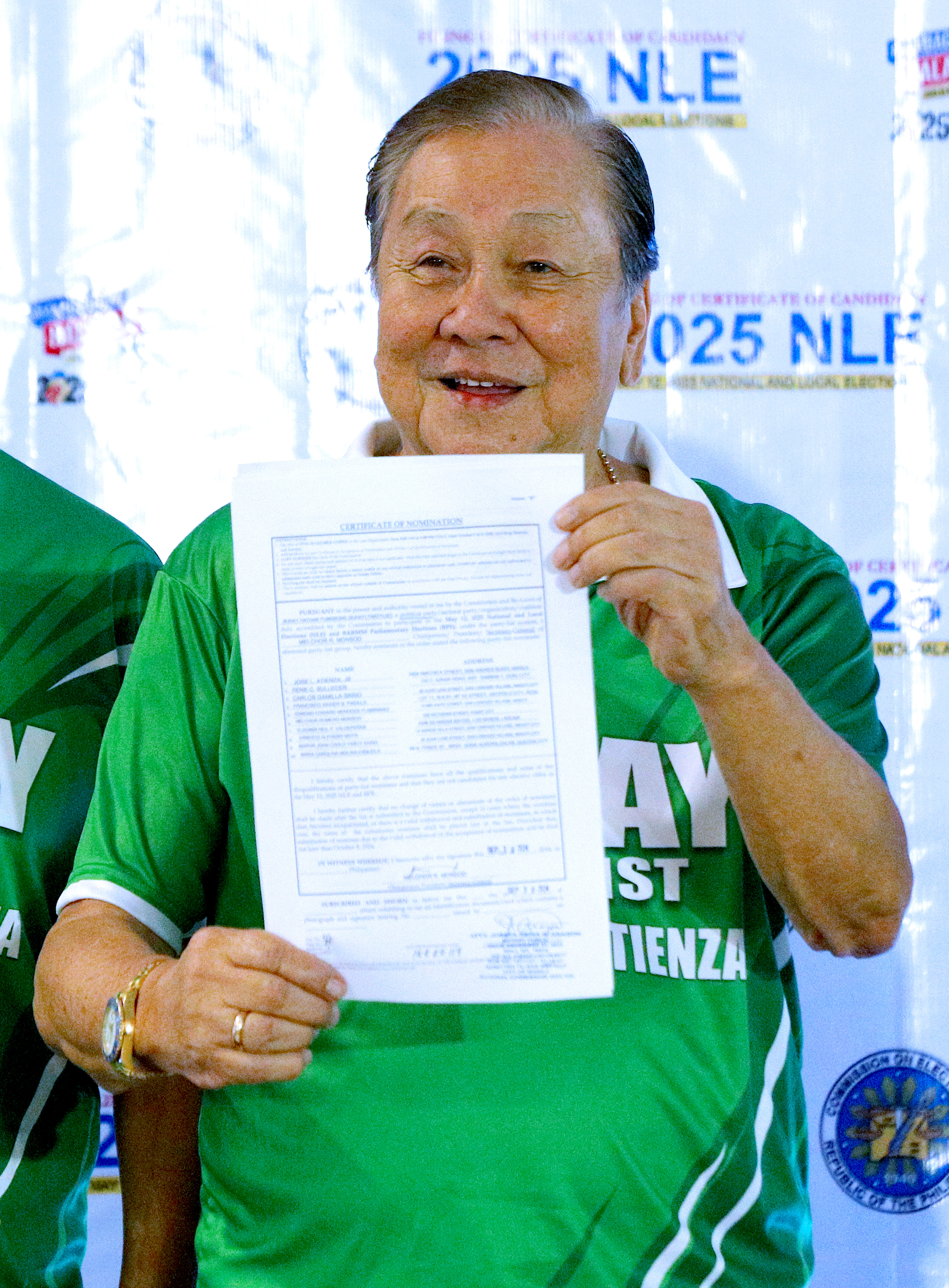
Candidate	Lito Atienza	Jaime de la Rosa	Antonio Evangelista
Party	PRP	Lakas	LDP
Popular vote	237,215	123,275	105,726
Percentage	35.69	18.55	15.91
Candidate	Abraham Cabochan
Party	PDP–Laban
Popular vote	55,456
Percentage	8.34
Vice Mayor before election
Ernesto P. Maceda, Jr.
NPC
Elected Vice Mayor
Lito Atienza
PRP

Local elections was held in the City of Manila on May 11, 1992, within the Philippine general elections after the passing of 1987 constitution and its transition period from 1988 to 1992. The voters elected for the elective local posts in the city: the mayor, vice mayor, the six congressmen, and the councilors, six in each of the city's six legislative districts.

Mel Lopez, the incumbent mayor from 1986 to 1987, got his term of own right in 1988. Lopez will face NBI director and former Western Police District (WPD) chief Alfredo Lim, former Mayor Ramon Bagatsing, 6th district representative Pablo V. Ocampo, 6th district councilor Manuel Isip and 1988 running mate Danny Lacuna, who resigned as vice mayor before the election. Lacuna was replaced by Ernesto P. Maceda, Jr. Lopez's past opponent Lito Atienza, is now Lim's running-mate.

The tandem of Lim and Atienza won the elections.

== Results ==
=== For Mayor ===
NBI director and former Western Police District chief Alfredo Lim won the elections against incumbent mayor Mel Lopez, former mayor Ramon Bagatsing and former vice mayor Danny Lacuna.

1992 Manila mayoral election
Candidate	Party	Votes	%
Alfredo Lim	People's Reform Party	226,403	31.54
Mel Lopez	Lakas–NUCD	172,695	24.06
Ramon Bagatsing	Laban ng Demokratikong Pilipino	135,069	18.82
Danny Lacuna	PDP–Laban	105,058	14.64
Pablo V. Ocampo	Nationalist People's Coalition	54,353	7.57
Reynaldo Fajardo	Kilusang Bagong Lipunan	23,956	3.34
Antonio Gamo	Independent	120	0.02
Eduardo Figueras	Independent	89	0.01
Total		717,743	100.00

=== For Vice Mayor ===
Incumbent vice mayor Ernesto Maceda Jr. opted to run for a return as a 4th district councilor instead of seeking a full term as vice mayor. Former NHA general manager Lito Atienza won the elections against 4th district councilor Jaime de la Rosa and 1st district councilor Abraham Cabochan.

1992 Manila vice mayoral election
Candidate	Party	Votes	%
Lito Atienza	People's Reform Party	237,215	35.69
Jaime de la Rosa	Lakas–NUCD	123,275	18.55
Antonio Evangelista	Laban ng Demokratikong Pilipino	105,726	15.91
Abraham Cabochan	PDP–Laban	55,456	8.34
Reynaldo Jose	Nationalist People's Coalition	48,418	7.28
Manuel Isip	KBL/Nacionalista	36,409	5.48
Carlos Fernandez	Nacionalista Party	24,545	3.69
Roberto Sese	KBL/Nacionalista	15,319	2.30
Vicente Pulido	Kilusang Bagong Lipunan	9,297	1.40
Manuel Abarquez	Independent	7,686	1.16
Armando Ducat Jr.	Independent	1,362	0.20
Total		664,708	100.00

=== Manila's 1st district ===
Incumbent Martin Isidro Sr. of Laban ng Demokratikong Pilipino was re-elected to a second term.

Candidate	Party	Votes	%
Martin Isidro Sr. (incumbent)	Laban ng Demokratikong Pilipino	75,488	62.16
Ernesto Dionisio	Koalisyong Pambansa	39,193	32.27
Cesar Serrano	Kilusang Bagong Lipunan	4,306	3.55
Crisogono Bayani Jr.	Nationalist People's Coalition	2,310	1.90
Camilo Loforteza	People's Reform Party	105	0.09
Guadalupe Cabiades	Partido Sambayanang Pilipino	38	0.03
Total		121,440	100.00
Source: Commission on Elections

=== Manila's 2nd district ===
Incumbent Jaime Lopez of Lakas–NUCD was re-elected to a second term.

Candidate	Party	Votes	%
Jaime Lopez (incumbent)	Lakas–NUCD	49,447	44.11
Jimmy Bautista	Koalisyong Pambansa	28,903	25.79
Florante Yambot	Independent	12,531	11.18
Alberto Lim	Nationalist People's Coalition	11,039	9.85
Romeo Ramin	People's Reform Party	6,774	6.04
Blesilda Flores	Kilusang Bagong Lipunan	3,394	3.03
Total		112,088	100.00
Source: Commission on Elections

=== Manila's 3rd district ===
Incumbent Leonardo Fugoso of Koalisyong Pambansa was re-elected to a second term.

Candidate	Party	Votes	%
Leonardo Fugoso (incumbent)	Koalisyong Pambansa	32,718	37.89
Susana Ong	Laban ng Demokratikong Pilipino	22,164	25.67
Alex Co	Lakas–NUCD	18,470	21.39
Meliza Galang	Nationalist People's Coalition	9,429	10.92
Gil de Guzman	People's Reform Party	3,572	4.14
Total		86,353	100.00
Source: Commission on Elections

=== Manila's 4th district ===
Incumbent Ramon Bagatsing Jr. of Laban ng Demokratikong Pilipino was re-elected to a second term.

Candidate	Party	Votes	%
Ramon Bagatsing Jr. (incumbent)	Laban ng Demokratikong Pilipino	59,149	57.37
Salvador Tolentino	Nacionalista/NPC	14,029	13.61
Emilio Bonoan	Lakas–NUCD	12,640	12.26
Eduardo Quintos	Koalisyong Pambansa	9,699	9.41
Alex Gonzales	People's Reform Party	7,588	7.36
Total		103,105	100.00
Source: Commission on Elections

=== Manila's 5th district ===
Incumbent Amado Bagatsing of Laban ng Demokratikong Pilipino was re-elected to a second term.

Candidate	Party	Votes	%
Amado Bagatsing (incumbent)	Laban ng Demokratikong Pilipino	62,094	54.28
Felicisimo Cabigao	Lakas–NUCD	24,118	21.08
Suzano Gonzales	Nationalist People's Coalition	16,489	14.41
Emmanuel Santos	People's Reform Party	7,448	6.51
Willie Espiritu	Nacionalista/KBL	3,609	3.15
Bert Fuentes	Koalisyong Pambansa	234	0.20
Librado Cuarasal	Kilusang Bagong Lipunan	195	0.17
Jose Canda	People's Reform Party	111	0.10
Emma Flores	Independent	105	0.09
Total		114,403	100.00
Source: Commission on Elections

=== Manila's 6th district ===
Incumbent Pablo V. Ocampo of the Nationalist People's Coalition (NPC) ran for mayor of Manila. The NPC nominated Ocampo's daughter, Rosenda Ann Ocampo, who won the election.

Candidate	Party	Votes	%
Rosenda Ann Ocampo	Nationalist People's Coalition	30,539	28.55
Julio Logarta	Laban ng Demokratikong Pilipino	19,351	18.09
Benedicto Dorado	Lakas–NUCD	18,595	17.39
Fernando Carrascoso	Laban ng Demokratikong Pilipino	17,686	16.54
Quirino Marquinez	People's Reform Party	11,885	11.11
Marcial Magsino	Koalisyong Pambansa	6,910	6.46
Federico Blay	Kilusang Bagong Lipunan	1,988	1.86
Total		106,954	100.00
Source: Commission on Elections
