= Juliana Rae Ibay =

Filipina youth leader and politician

Member of the City Council of Manila
- Incumbent
- Assumed office November 30, 2023
- Constituency: Ex-officio (SK President)

Sangguniang Kabataan Chairman of Barangay 764, Manila
- Incumbent
- Assumed office November 30, 2023

Personal details
- Born: Juliana Rae Ibay Manila
- Citizenship: Filipino
- Education: De La Salle University
- Occupation: Politician

Juliana Rae "Yanyan" Ibay, is a Filipina youth leader, politician and actress currently serving as ex officio city councilor for Sangguniang Kabataan (SK) of Manila City Council and SK Chairman of Barangay 764, San Andres, Manila.

== Manila City Council ==
She was known for debating with City Council Presiding officer and Vice Mayor Yul Servo on what she called "secret session" about her removal as youth committee chairperson (Committee on Youth Welfare and Development). She berated Servo and she stating that her removal is illegal. Ibay filed a case on Ombudsman against Servo. Later, the post was returned to Ibay.

== Controversies ==
=== SK Manila Thailand junket ===
On September 6, 2025, Sangguniang Kabataan of Manila led by Ibay attended a capacity development and international benchmarking program with St. Robert’s International College which focus the HIV awareness, which was approved by Department of the Interior and Local Government (DILG) according to her. While in Thailand, many of SK Manila members bragged the tour by doing live and posts in social media showing their trip.

The said trip was funded through SK funds, with ₱30,000 allocation for each participant for costs including rainings, seminars, transportation, food, and accommodation. Also, every participants received a ₱6,000 daily allowance in line with government guidelines.

The acts of the members draws criticisms from netizens and called it a 'junket', with prompted the DILG Secretary Jonvic Remulla to reevaluate SK travel policies.

== Acting career ==
Ibay appeared on 2019 film Jolly Spirit Squad and TV anthology Maynila episode titled My Unwanted Son.
