= Eulogio "Amang" Rodriguez Institute of Science and Technology =

Public college in Manila, Philippines

- Dalubhasaang Eulogio "Amang" Rodriguez sa Agham at Teknolohiya (Filipino)
- Seal of EARIST
- Former names: Eulogio Rodriguez Vocational High School (1945–1972); Eulogio "Amang" Rodriguez Memorial School of Arts and Trades (EARMSAT) (1972–1978)
- Type: Public Coeducational non-profit higher education institution
- Established: January 21, 1945; 81 years ago
- Academic affiliations: SCUAA, AACCUP
- Chairperson: Hon. Desiderio R. Apag III, PCpE, D.Eng., ASEAN Eng.
- President: Engr. Rogelio T. Mamaradlo, Ed.D.
- Director: Dr. Jacel D. Mabansag (Cavite Branch)
- Faculty: c. 400
- Students: c. 15,000
- Location: Santa Mesa, Manila (Main Campus) General Mariano Alvarez, Cavite (Cavite Branch), Philippines; 14°35′57″N 121°00′04″E
- Campus: Urban Main: Manila Satellite: Cavite
- Hymn: EARIST Hymn
- Newspaper: Earist Technozette
- Colors: Red and Cream
- Nickname: EARIST Red Fox
- Sporting affiliations: UniGames, PISCUAA, NAASCU
- Mascot: Red Fox
- Website: earist.edu.ph
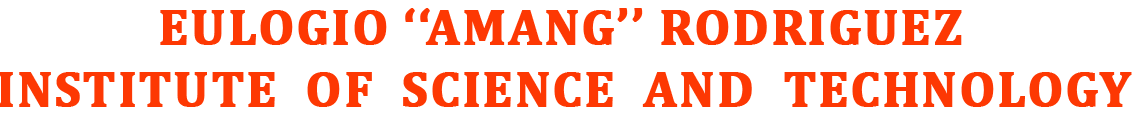

- Location in Metro Manila Location in Luzon Location in the Philippines

The Eulogio "Amang" Rodriguez Institute of Science and Technology (commonly referred to as EARIST; Filipino: Dalubhasaang Eulogio "Amang" Rodriguez sa Agham at Teknolohiya) is a public college in Santa Mesa, Manila in the Philippines. It was named after Eulogio Rodriguez, one of the longest serving senators in the country.

Founded in 1945 as a vocational-technical high school, it has evolved into a full-fledged higher education institution offering undergraduate and postgraduate degree programs by virtue of the Republic Act 6595.

EARIST has approximately 15,000 students, eight colleges, a graduate school, and a satellite campus in Cavite. EARIST's program accreditation lists 52 program accreditations granted by the Accrediting Agency of Chartered Colleges and Universities in the Philippines (AACCUP): three at Level IV, eight at Level III, 25 at Level II, 14 at Level I, and two at Candidate status. The programs at Level IV are the Bachelor of Science in Hospitality Management, the Bachelor of Technology and Livelihood Education (majors in Home Economics and Industrial Arts), and the Bachelor of Secondary Education (majors in Science and Mathematics). EARIST was also rated Level II under the CHED–DBM–PASUC Leveling Evaluation. All undergraduate programs of the Manila and Cavite campuses have been granted a Certificate of Program Compliance (COPC) by the Commission on Higher Education Regional Offices for the National Capital Region and Region IV-A.

The institute is envisioned to develop its students in the fields of trades, business, arts, science, and technology education..

== History ==
The Eulogio "Amang" Rodriguez Institute of Science and Technology (EARIST) was established after the liberation of Manila in 1945. It started as a vocational school with only one room at the second floor of the Mapa High School, nine teachers, a clerk, and 147 students. Its former name was Eulogio Rodriguez Vocational High School (ERVHS).

In July 1946, EARIST acquired its present site in Nagtahan, Santa Mesa, Manila. Apolinario Apilado was appointed as the principal, succeeded by Dr. Hilario Nudas in 1949.

EARIST's development was made possible through three Republic Acts and a Presidential Decree:

- The Republic Act 4072 was jointly sponsored by then Congressman Ramon Bagatsing and Salih Ututalum in 1964, authorized the establishment of the Technical Education Department without changing the name of the school. It was headed by a vocational director.

"Section 1. A vocational technical department which shall offer courses above secondary level is hereby established in the Eulogio Rodriguez Vocational High School in the City of Manila."

- The Republic Act 5088 was sponsored by Congressman Sergio Loyola in 1967, authorized the renaming of ERVHS to Eulogio "Amang" Rodriguez Memorial School of Arts and Trades (EARMSAT) and signaled its separation from the Division of City Schools, Manila. It was headed by a superintendent.
- The Republic Act 6595 was sponsored by Congressman Joaquin R. Roces in 1972, converted EARMSAT to EARIST with a president as its head. This made EARIST into a full-fledged college and authorized the establishment of vocational-technical school branches in each congressional district of Manila.
- The Presidential Decree 1524 which was signed by President Ferdinand E. Marcos on June 11, 1978, that converted Eulogio "Amang" Rodriguez Institute of Science and Technology (EARIST) into a chartered state college with a board of trustees as its governing body and Dr. Hilario G. Nudas, as its first college president.

"Further amending certain sections of Republic Act numbered four thousand seventy-two entitled "an act providing for the establishment of a vocational technical department of the Eulogio Rodriguez Vocational High School in the City of Manila" as amended by Republic Act numbered five thousand eighty-eight entitled "an act converting Eulogio Rodriguez Vocational High School into Eulogio "Amang" Rodriguez Memorial School of Arts and Trades" by providing for a board of trustees, defining the board's powers and duties, and for other purposes."

== Campuses ==
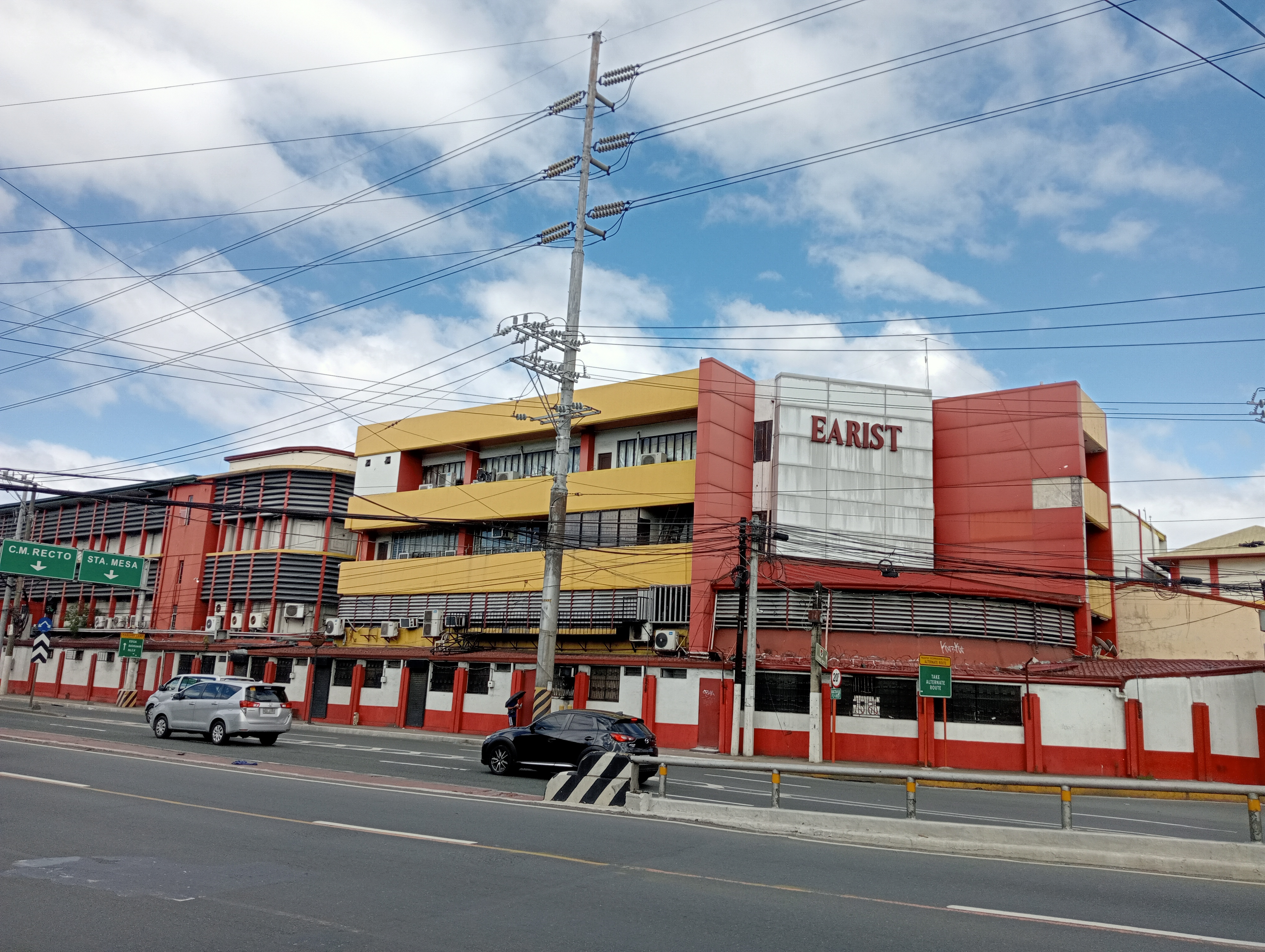
The exterior of the Manila campus of Eulogio Amang Rodriguez Institute of Science and Technology

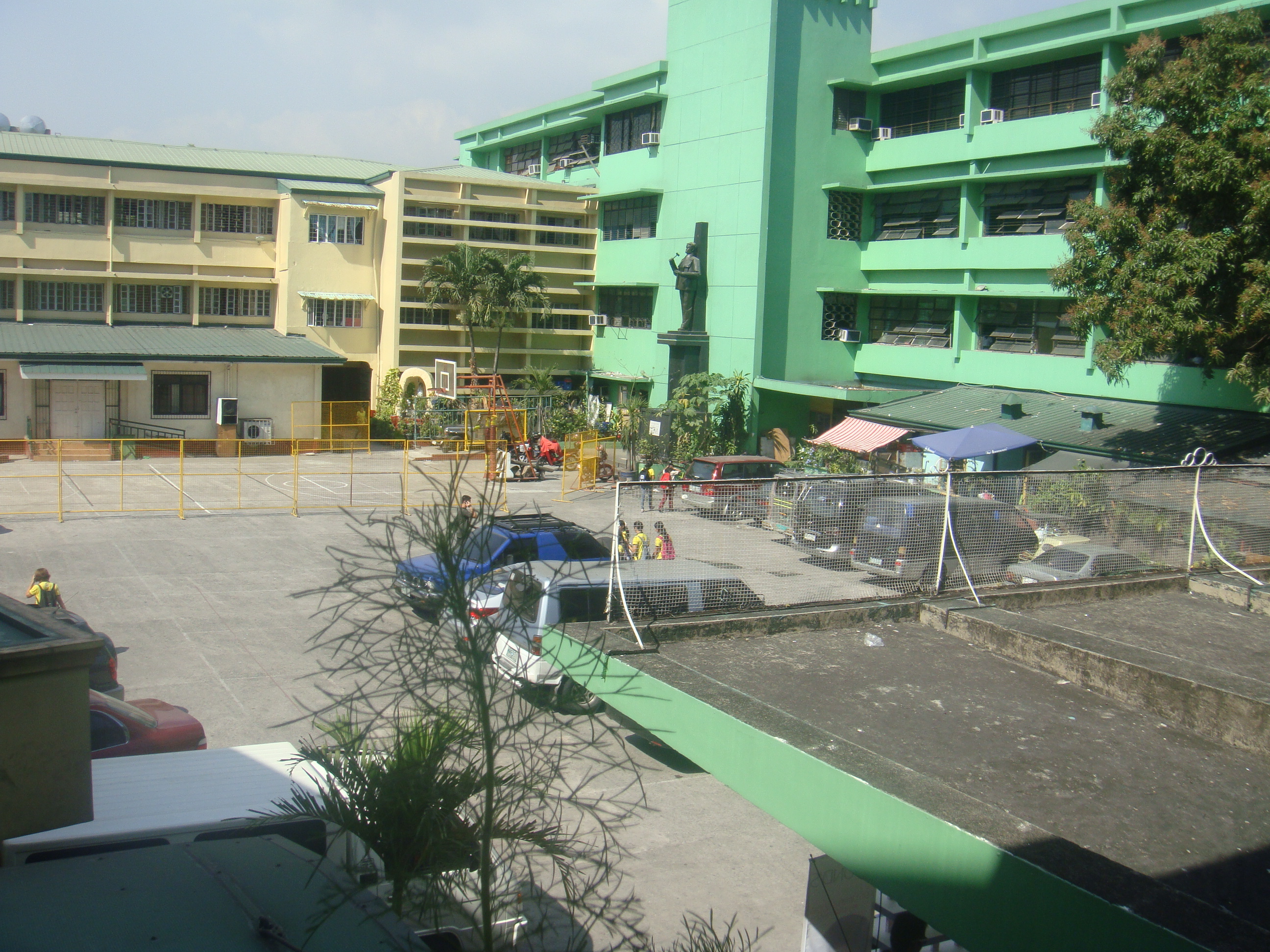
Inside the EARIST Manila Campus

=== Manila Campus ===
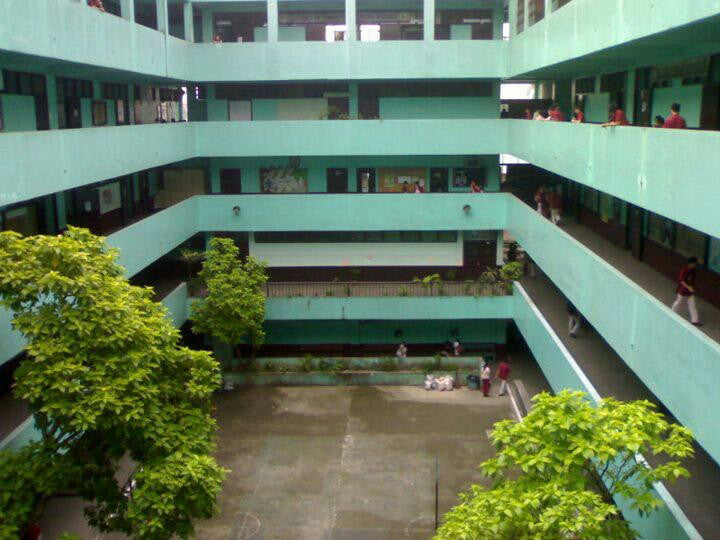
EARIST Quadrangle

The Manila Campus of EARIST is along Nagtahan Street in Santa Mesa, Manila. It serves as the main campus.

=== Cavite Branch ===
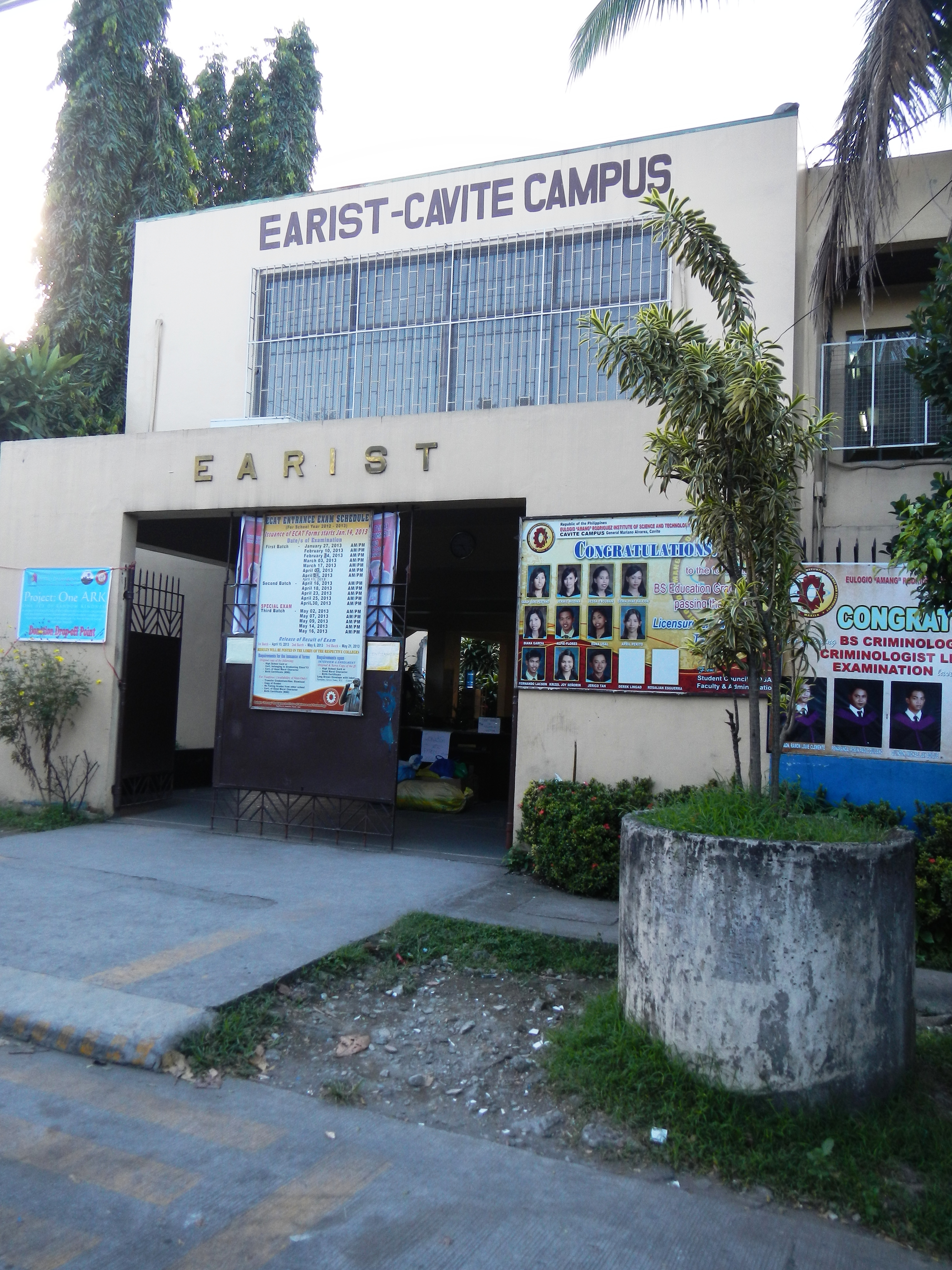
The entrance gate of the EARIST General Mariano Alvarez Campus in

EARIST Cavite Branch, formerly called EARIST-GASAT (General Alvarez School of Arts and Trades), is a satellite campus. It operates with the funding support from the budgetary allotment of its mother institution, EARIST Manila. It is the only state college in Gen. Mariano Alvarez, Cavite and is accredited by the Commission on Higher Education (CHED) and by the Accrediting Agency of Chartered Colleges and Universities in the Philippines (AACCUP).

Being a government-funded college, it has been providing quality science and technology education with the lowest tuition fee for the less privileged but deserving residents in G.M.A. and other municipalities in Cavite and CALABARZON area. Established on March 24, 1982, EARIST Cavite Campus started by offering vocational and technical courses with Dr. Rodrigo Hipol as the superintendent using the old NASIDA Building. Later, it was transferred to its present campus site, a 31,282-square-meter lot donated by the National Housing Authority (NHA) to the college in 1986.

In 1983, it opened the four-year Secondary Trade Education program and offered the following collegiate courses: Bachelor of Science in Industrial Technology (BSIT) in 1985–1986; Bachelor of Science in Industrial Education (BSIE); and Bachelor of Science in Business Education (BSBE) in 1989–90; Bachelor of Science in Office Administration (BSOA) course in 1999–2000; Bachelor of Science in Computer Science (BSCS) in 1995–96; Bachelor of Science in Hotel and Restaurant Management (BSHRM); and the Bachelor of Science in education (BSE) in school year 2003–2004. Through the collaborative effort of EARIST administration and the municipal and provincial government, led by former Congressman Renato Dragon, its present three-story main building was initially constructed in March 1990 and ten-phase building projects were completed in 1999.

== Student life ==
=== Athletics ===
EARIST Red Fox is the official name of the varsity teams of the institute. It regularly participates in athletic games organized by State Colleges and Universities Athletic Association - National Capital Region (SCUAA-NCR), Philippine Inter Schools, Colleges and Universities Athletic Association (PISCUAA), and Philippine University Games.

Some of the sports the institute has been practicing include arnis, basketball, cheerleading, chess, dancesport, sepak takraw, swimming, table tennis, and volleyball

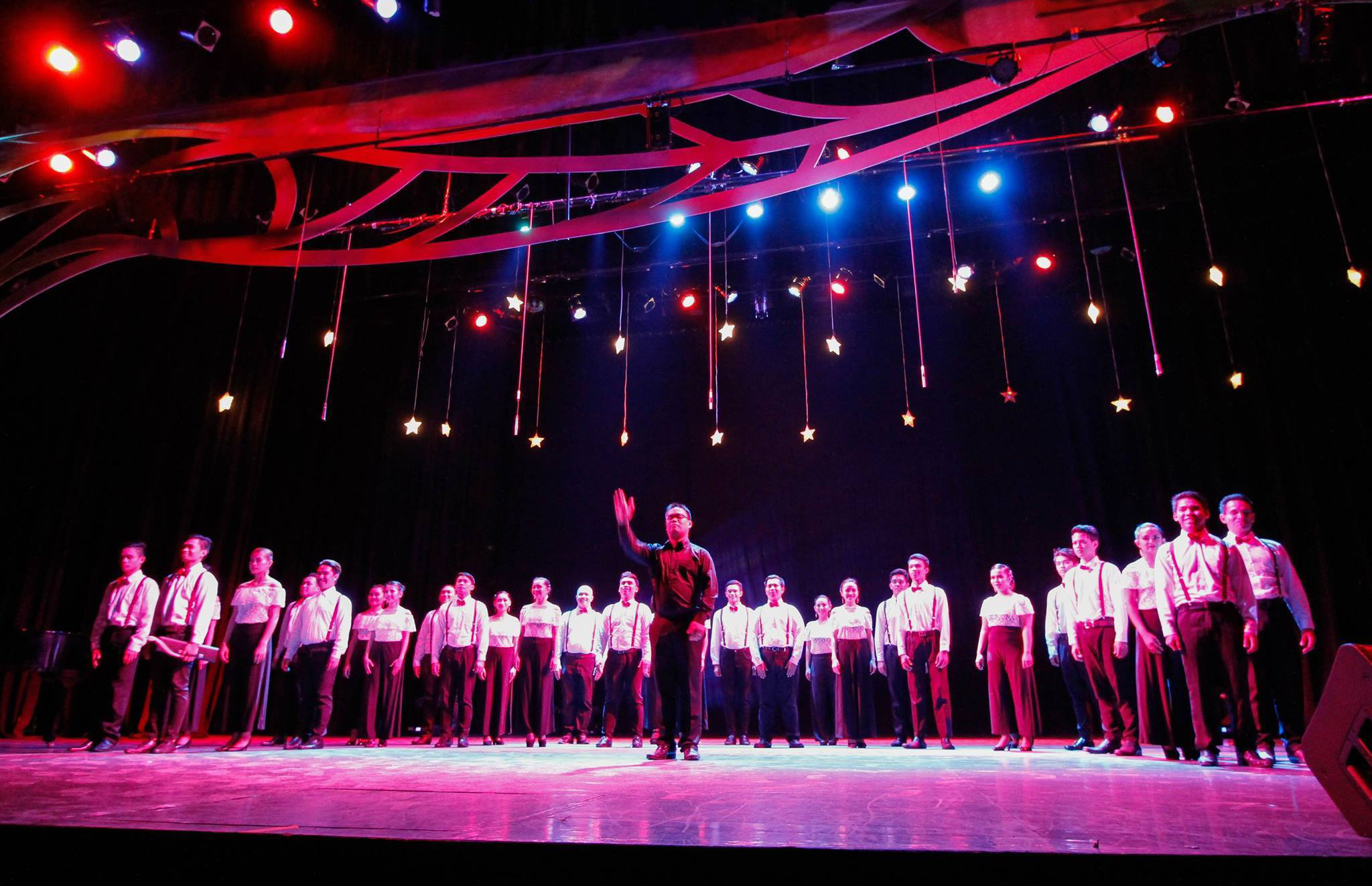
MBC National Choral Competition 2015

=== Music ===
- EARIST Chorale - the official chorale group. Actively participates in various competitions.
- EARIST Rondalla - the official extracurricular activity. Part of EARIST's Cultural Activity Program. Currently conducted by Christian Aplaon.

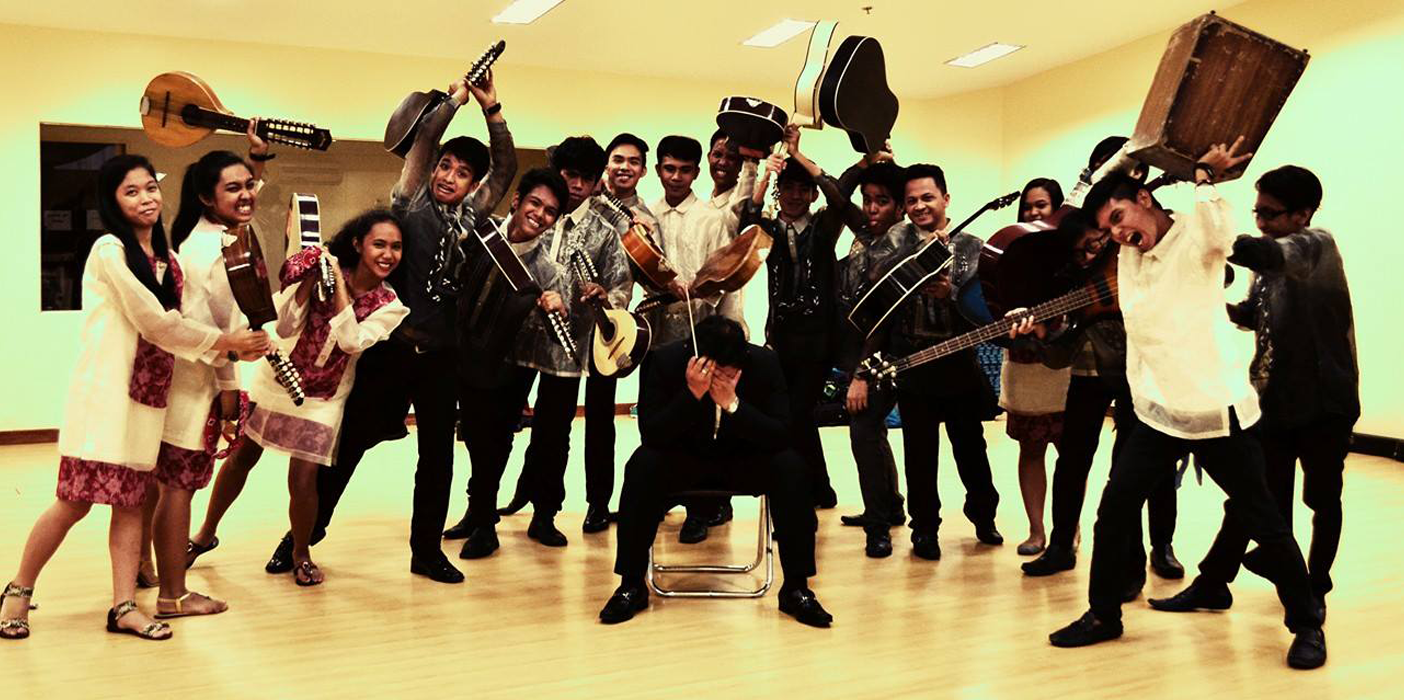
Earist Rondalla

=== Publication ===
The official student publication of EARIST Manila Campus is the EARIST Technozette that published its first issue in 1980. It is a member of the College Editors Guild of the Philippines (CEGP), the oldest organization of student publications in the Philippines committed to protect students' rights.

The Champion is the official student newspaper of EARIST Cavite Branch.

=== 'No haircut, no enrollment' controversy ===
On March 16, 2024, the EARIST administration voided a 'No haircut, no enrollment' provision in its student handbook denying "enrollment to male students, including transgenders, unless they conform to the prescribed hair length and uniform". “This afternoon we facilitated a dialogue between the EARIST administration, led by president Rogelio Mamaraldo, and the affected students led by Red Riotoc of the Bahaghari-EARIST body to dialogue and find ways of solving the problem... Both sides found common ground,” CHED Chair De Vera said. Manila Councilor Joel Villanueva moved for “the strict implementation and enforcement of Ordinance 8695, a measure passed in 2020 meant to protect members of the LGBTQIA+ community".

== Academics ==
EARIST has two campuses, the main campus in Manila and a satellite campus in Cavite. It is divided into nine colleges, a graduate school, and a general education department.

- College of Arts and Sciences
- College of Architecture and Fine Arts
- College of Business Administration
- College of Computing Studies
- College of Criminal Justice Education
- College of Education
- College of Engineering
- College of Hospitality and Tourism Management
- College of Industrial Technology
- Graduate School
- General Education Department
