= Manila City Council =

Legislative body of the city of Manila, Philippines

Manila City Council Sangguniang Panlungsod ng Maynila Cabildo de Manila
- 13th Manila City Council
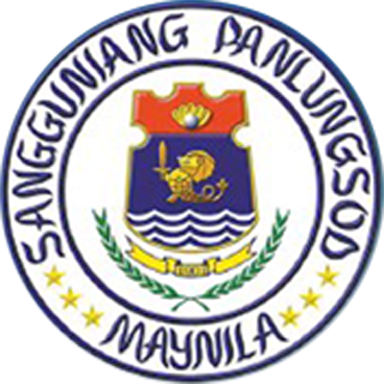
- Seal

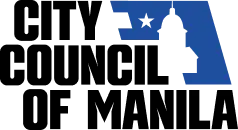
- Logo

Type
- Type: Unicameral
- Term limits: 3 terms (9 years)

Leadership
- Presiding Officer: Chi Atienza (Aksyon)
- President Pro-Tempore: Timothy Oliver Zarcal (Aksyon)
- Majority Floor Leader: Raymundo Yupangco (Aksyon)
- Minority Floor Leader: Don Juan Bagatsing (Aksyon)

Structure
- Seats: 38 councilors (including 2 ex officio members); 1 ex officio presiding officer
- Political groups: Aksyon (23) Asenso Manileño (12) Independent (1) Nonpartisan (2)
- Length of term: 3 years
- Authority: Manila City Charter; Local Government Code of the Philippines

Elections
- Voting system: Plurality-at-large voting (36 seats); Indirect elections (2 seats)
- Last election: May 12, 2025
- Next election: May 8, 2028

Meeting place
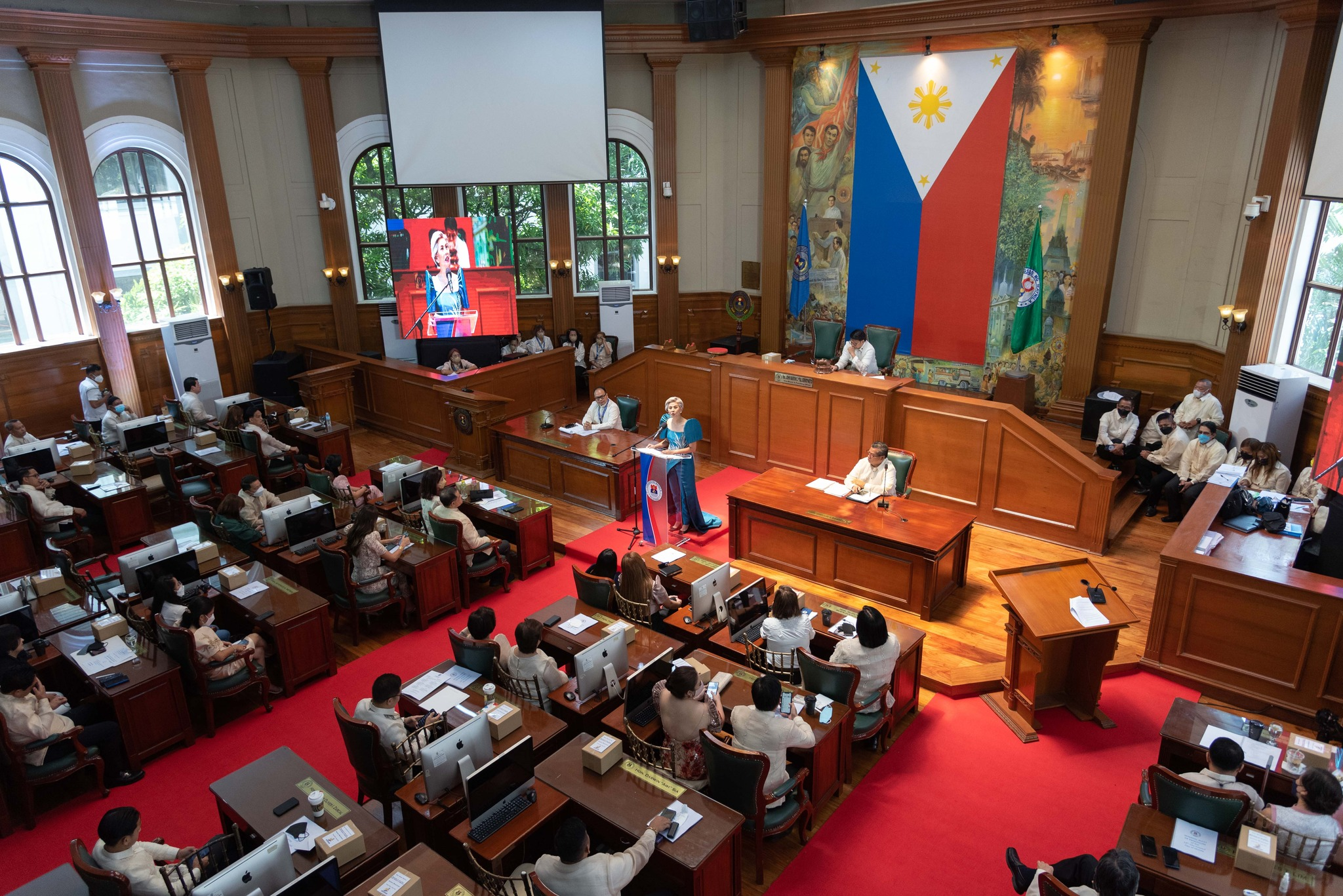
- Danilo B. Lacuna Sr. Hall, Manila City Hall

Website
- citycouncilofmanila.com.ph manila.gov.ph/citycouncil/

The Manila City Council (Spanish: Cabildo de Manila; Tagalog: Sangguniang Panlungsod ng Maynila) is the legislature of Manila, the capital city of the Philippines. It is composed of 38 councilors, with 36 councilors elected from Manila's six councilor districts (coextensive with the Legislative districts of Manila) and two councilors elected from the ranks of barangay (neighborhood) chairmen and the Sangguniang Kabataan (SK; youth councils). The presiding officer of the council is the Vice Mayor, who is elected citywide.

The council is responsible for creating laws and ordinances under Manila's jurisdiction. The mayor can veto proposed bills, but the council can override it with a two-thirds supermajority.

== History ==
After the Spanish incorporated Manila as a city in 1571, membership to the council was originally restricted to them. On June 24, 1571 (which would later be declared as Manila Day), the municipal government, or the Cabildo was established, consisting of two mayors, twelve councilors, and a secretary. The mayor was chosen by lottery, with councilors nominating four candidates, with two candidates being drawn to serve as mayors.

In 1689, the council ordered the expulsion on non-Christian Chinese in the city, leading to a decline in Chinese population by 1700.

This would be the setup until 1901, after the Americans took control of the islands. Under the provisions of the Manila City Charter enacted that same year, the Manila Municipal Board was established, consisting of three members appointed by the Civil Governor with the approval of the Philippine Commission. These members could be removed through the same process. One of the appointees was designated as the president of the Board and was tasked with presiding over all meetings. In 1903, the Philippine Commission enacted Act No. 936, expanding the Municipal Board’s composition to five members by including the City Engineer and the President of the Advisory Board as ex officio members. During that time, the Municipal Board consisted of two Filipinos and three Americans. An advisory board was included, with all eleven members being Filipinos, representing each of Manila's 11 wards. In 1916, the advisory board was abolished, and the municipal board was increased to ten members, all of them elected by Filipinos, although the mayor was still appointed. However, the municipal board ceased to function until World War II. It reconvened on July 20, 1945, upon the liberation of Manila, consisting of new members appointed by President Sergio Osmeña.

In 1949, the Revised City Charter modified the board's composition: five members from each of the city's four districts, with the vice mayor becoming its presiding officer. All members were elected in 1951. In 1975, three years after the declaration of martial law in 1972 by President Ferdinand Marcos, the board was abolished as legislative powers for the entire Metro Manila was exercised by the Metropolitan Manila Commission.

After the People Power Revolution, the municipal board was revived, which gradually evolved into the present-day city council. The 1987 Constitution finalized today's setup when it divided the city into six districts, with each district electing six councilors, plus two more councilors from the barangay captains and SK president. The first post-People Power era election to the new city council was held in 1988.

== Seat ==
The Danilo B. Lacuna Sr. Hall inside the Manila City Hall is the session hall of the city council. It is named after Danilo Lacuna, the longest-serving vice mayor of Manila. Since 2012, it is powered via solar panels, which were made in Taiwan. In its inauguration, Vice Mayor Isko Moreno remarked that "The City of Manila will be the first to use this kind of technology here in the Philippines."

The Spanish-era cabildo met at the Ayuntamiento de Manila, also known as the Casas Consistoriales, in Intramuros.

== Membership ==
Each of Manila's six councilor districts elects six councilors to the council. In plurality-at-large voting, a voter may vote up to six candidates, with the candidates having the six highest number of votes being elected. In addition, the barangay chairmen and the SK chairmen throughout the city elect amongst themselves their representatives to the council. Hence, there are 38 councilors.

City council elections are synchronized with other elections in the country. Elections are held every first Monday of May every third year since 1992 for 36 seats, while the ex officio seats are elected irregularly, but always proceeding a barangay election.

=== Current members ===
==== Leadership ====
- Presiding Officer: Vice Mayor Chi Atienza
- Presiding Officer Pro-Tempore: Timothy Oliver Zarcal
- Majority Leader: Raymundo Yupangco
- Minority Leader: Don Juan Bagatsing
- 1st Assistant Majority Leader: Jaybee Hizon
  - 2nd Assistant Majority Leader:
- 1st Assistant Minority Leader:
  - 2nd Assistant Minority Leader:
- Secretary to the City Council (City Government Department Head III): Atty. Hans Roger S. Luna
  - Assistant Secretary to the City Council (City Government Assistant Department Head III): Mr. Joshue R. Santiago, MPMG

==== Composition ====
As of June 30, 2025:

| Vice mayor | | | | | | |
| Ex officio | | | | | | |
| District / Seat | 1 | 2 | 3 | 4 | 5 | 6 |
| District 1 | | | | | | |
| District 2 | | | | | | |
| District 3 | | | | | | |
| District 4 | | | | | | |
| District 5 | | | | | | |
| District 6 | | | | | | |

| Party | Seats | % |
|---|---|---|
| Aksyon | 23 | 61% |
| Asenso | 12 | 31% |
| Independent | 1 | 3% |
| Nonpartisan | 2 | 5% |
| Total | 38 | 100% |

==== Members (2025–2028) ====
| Seat | Name | Party | Bloc |
|---|---|---|---|
| Presiding officer | Chi Atienza | Aksyon | Majority |
| 1st district | Joaquin Domagoso | Aksyon | Majority |
| 1st district | Jesus E. Fajardo Jr. | Aksyon | Majority |
| 1st district | Erick Ian O. Nieva | Aksyon | Majority |
| 1st district | Irma C. Alfonso | Aksyon | Majority |
| 1st district | Rosalino P. Ibay Jr. | Aksyon | Majority |
| 1st district | Moises Cleon Merrick G. Limyuen | Asenso | Minority |
| 2nd district | Darwin B. Sia | Aksyon | Majority |
| 2nd district | Numero G. Lim | Asenso | Minority |
| 2nd district | Ruben F. Buenaventura | Asenso | Minority |
| 2nd district | Edward M. Tan | Aksyon | Majority |
| 2nd district | Rodolfo N. Lacsamana | Asenso | Minority |
| 2nd district | John Christoper L. Sy | Aksyon | Majority |
| 3rd district | Ernesto C. Isip Jr. | Asenso | Minority |
| 3rd district | Pamela G. Fugoso | Asenso | Minority |
| 3rd district | Maile Atienza | Asenso | Minority |
| 3rd district | Timothy Oliver I. Zarcal | Aksyon | Majority |
| 3rd district | Karen Czareina Socorro C. Alibarbar | Asenso | Minority |
| 3rd district | Jefferson Lau | Asenso | Minority |
| 4th district | Louisa Marie J. Quintos | Aksyon | Majority |
| 4th district | Don Juan Bagatsing | Aksyon | Minority |
| 4th district | Science A. Reyes | Asenso | Minority |
| 4th district | Francis Michael U. Almiron | Aksyon | Majority |
| 4th district | Mark Ryan B. Ponce | Independent | Majority |
| 4th district | Eunice Ann Denice G. Castro | Aksyon | Majority |
| 5th district | Rafael P. Borromeo | Aksyon | Majority |
| 5th district | Jaybee S. Hizon | Aksyon | Majority |
| 5th district | Roberto S. Espiritu III | Aksyon | Majority |
| 5th district | Raymundo R. Yupangco | Aksyon | Majority |
| 5th district | Charry R. Ortega | Asenso | Minority |
| 5th district | Mark Anthony A. Ignacio | Aksyon | Majority |
| 6th district | Lou Veloso | Aksyon | Majority |
| 6th district | Elmer M. Par | Aksyon | Majority |
| 6th district | Christian Paul L. Uy | Aksyon | Majority |
| 6th district | Voltaire Carlo D. Castañeda | Aksyon | Majority |
| 6th district | Benny Fog T. Abante III | Asenso | Minority |
| 6th district | Fernando S. Mercado | Aksyon | Majority |
| ABC | Erika Platon (Barangay 719, Malate) | Nonpartisan | Majority |
| SK | Juliana Rae Ibay (Barangay 764, San Andres) | Nonpartisan | Majority |

== Notable councilors ==
- Benny Abante
- Rosauro C. Almario, essayist, secretary of Mayor Ramon Fernandez
- Herminio A. Astorga, basketball player
- Ali Atienza
- Hermenegildo Atienza
- Kim Atienza, television personality
- Greco Belgica
- Isabel F. de los Reyes, Sr. , founder of the Philippine Independent Church
- Jaime de la Rosa, actor
- Fernando María Guerrero, poet and journalist
- León Maria Guerrero, writer
- Amado V. Hernandez, National Artist of the Philippines for Literature
- Danilo B. Lacuna, Sr. , former Manila vice mayor
- Honey Lacuna, dermatologist, former Manila mayor, and former Manila vice mayor
- Jhosep Lopez, associate justice of the Supreme Court of the Philippines
- Mel Lopez, former Manila mayor
- Carlos Loyzaga, basketball player
- Edward Maceda
- Ernesto Maceda, former Senate president
- Tomas B. Mapua, architect
- Isko Moreno, current Manila mayor, former Manila vice mayor and actor
- Juan Nolasco, doctor and former senator
- Carmen L. Planas, first woman elected to any government post in the Philippines
- Josefina Phodaca-Ambrosio, lawyer and politician
- Gonzalo Puyat II, sport administrator
- Yul Servo, actor
- Larry Silva, actor
- Antonio C. Torres, police chief
- Lou Veloso, actor

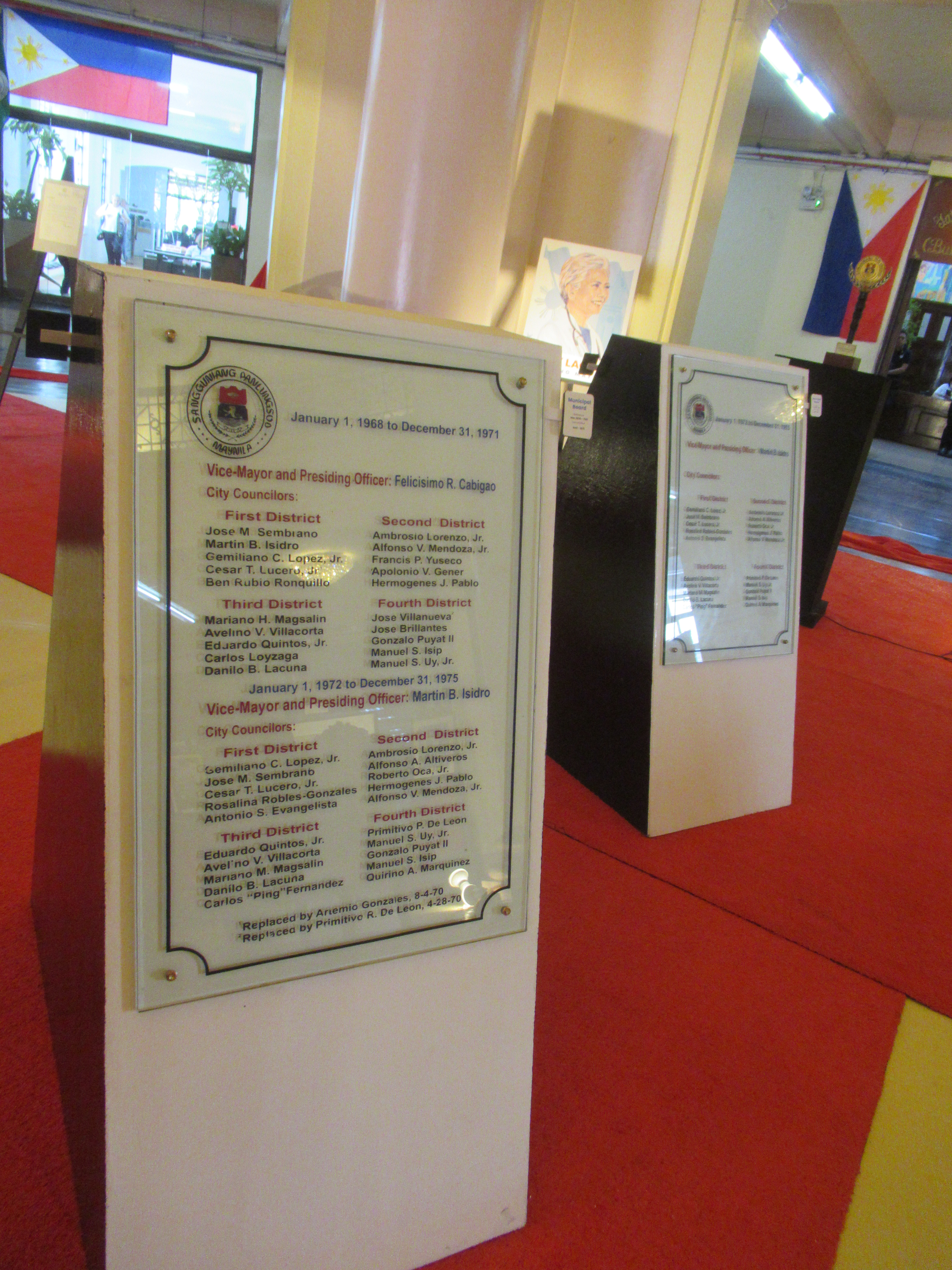
Manila City Hall

== Former members ==
| Name | District | Term |
|---|---|---|
| Niño dela Cruz | 1 | June 30, 2010 - June 30, 2019; June 30, 2022 - June 30, 2025 |
| Martin V. Isidro, Jr. | 1 | June 30, 1998 - June 30, 2007; June 30, 2016 - June 30, 2019; June 30, 2022 - June 30, 2025 |
| Moises T. Lim, Sr. | 1 | June 30, 2007-June 30, 2013; June 30, 2016-June 30, 2025 |
| Atty. Krystle Marie C. Bacani | 4 | March 17, 2015 - June 30, 2016; June 30, 2016 - June 30, 2019; June 30, 2019 - June 30, 2022; June 30, 2022 - June 30, 2025 |
| Atty. Joel T. Villanueva | 4 | June 30, 2016 - June 30, 2019; June 30, 2019 - June 30, 2022; June 30, 2022 - June 30, 2025 |
| Carlos "Caloy" Castañeda | 6 | June 30, 2016 – June 30, 2019; June 30, 2019 – June 30, 2022; June 30, 2022 – June 30, 2025 |
| Carlos "Caloy" Castañeda | Liga President | June 30, 2004-June 30, 2007-(Liga ng Mga Barangay Manila Chapter) |
| Salvador Philip Lacuna | 6 | June 30, 2019 – June 30, 2022; June 30, 2022 – June 30, 2025 |
| Salvador Philip Lacuna | Liga President | November 30, 2007 - November 30, 2010; November 30, 2010 - November 30, 2013; November 30, 2013 - June 30, 2018-(Liga ng Mga Barangay Manila Chapter) |
| Dr. Leilani Marie H. Lacuna | 6 | June 30, 2013 - June 30, 2016 |
| Dr. Leilani Marie H. Lacuna | Liga President | June 30, 2018 - November 30, 2023; November 30, 2023 - November 11, 2025-(Liga ng Mga Barangay Manila Chapter) |
| Joey Uy | 6 | June 30, 2004 - June 30, 2007; June 30, 2007 - June 30, 2010; June 30, 2010 - June 30, 2013; June 30, 2022 - June 30, 2025 |
| Ricardo "Boy" Isip, Jr. | 5 | June 30, 2016 - June 30, 2019; June 30, 2019 - June 30, 2022; June 30, 2022 - June 30, 2025 |
| Laris Borromeo | 5 | June 30, 2016 - June 30, 2019; June 30, 2019 - June 30, 2022; June 30, 2022 - June 30, 2025 |
| Dr. Luisito Louie Chua | 4 | June 30, 2004 - June 30, 2007; June 30, 2007 - June 30, 2010; June 30, 2010 - June 30, 2013; June 30, 2016 - June 30, 2019; June 30, 2019 - June 30, 2022; June 30, 2022 - June 30, 2025 |
| Terrence Alibarbar | 3 | June 30, 2016 - June 30, 2019; June 30, 2019 - June 30, 2022; June 30, 2022 - June 30, 2025 |
| Macario "Macky" M. Lacson | 2 | June 30, 2016 - June 30, 2019; June 30, 2019 - June 30, 2022; June 30, 2022 - June 30, 2025 |
| Roma Robles | 2 | June 30, 2019 - June 30, 2022; June 30, 2022 - June 30, 2025 |
| Apple Nieto | 3 | June 30, 2019 - June 30, 2022; June 30, 2022 - June 30, 2025 |
| Ernesto G. Dionisio, Sr. | 1 | February 3, 1988 – June 30, 1992; June 30, 1995 – June 30, 1998; June 30, 2004 – June 30, 2007; June 30, 2016 – June 30, 2019; June 30, 2019 – June 30, 2022 |
| Jesus Taga M. Fajardo, Sr. | 1 | December 1, 2008 – June 30, 2010; June 30, 2016 – June 30, 2019; June 30, 2019 – August 18, 2020 (Died in office) |
| Manuel M. Zarcal | 3 | June 30, 1992 – June 30, 1995; June 30, 1995 – June 30, 1998; June 30, 2001 – June 30, 2004; June 30, 2004 – June 30, 2007; June 30, 2007 – June 30, 2010; June 30, 2013 – June 30, 2016; June 30, 2016 – June 30, 2019; June 30, 2019 – June 30, 2022 (appointed Assistant Secretary to the Mayor June 30, 2020) |
| Joel R. Chua | 3 | June 30, 2007 – June 30, 2010; June 30, 2010 – June 30, 2013; June 30, 2013 – June 30, 2016; June 30, 2019 – June 30, 2022 |
| Peter M. Ong | 1 | June 30, 2016 – June 30, 2019; June 30, 2019 – June 30, 2022 |
| Grace R. Chua, CPA | 3 | June 30, 2016 – June 30, 2019 |
| Anna Katrina Puzon-Yupangco | 5 | June 30, 2016 – June 30, 2019 |
| Antonio Archimedes Matias G. Capistrano | 4 | June 30, 2013 – June 30, 2016; June 30, 2016 – June 30, 2019 |
| Eduardo Quintos XIV | 4 | June 30, 1998 – June 30, 2001; June 30, 2001 – June 30, 2004; June 30, 2004 – June 30, 2007; June 30, 2016 – June 30, 2019; June 30, 2019 – June 30, 2022 |
| Eduardo Quintos XVI | 4 | June 30, 2010 – June 30, 2013; June 30, 2016 – June 30, 2019 |
| Ma. Theresa Buenaventura | 2 | June 30, 2019 – June 30, 2022 |
| Jose "Joey" Hizon III | 5 | June 30, 2013 – June 30, 2016; June 30, 2016 – June 30, 2019; June 30, 2019 – June 30, 2022 |
| Ramon Robles | 2 | June 30, 2010 – June 30, 2013; June 30, 2013 – June 30, 2016; June 30, 2016 – June 30, 2019 |
| Rolando Valeriano | 2 | June 30, 2004 – June 30, 2007; June 30, 2007 – June 30, 2010; June 30, 2013 – June 30, 2016; June 30, 2016 – June 30, 2019 |
| Maria Asuncion "RE" G. Fugoso | 3 | June 30, 1998 – June 30, 2001; June 30, 2001 – June 30, 2004; June 30, 2004 – June 30, 2007; June 30, 2010 – June 30, 2013; June 30, 2013 – June 30, 2016; June 30, 2016 – June 30, 2019 |
| Bernardito C. Ang | 3 | February 3, 1988 – June 30, 1992; June 30, 1992 – June 30, 1995; June 30, 1998 – June 30, 2001; June 30, 2001 – June 30, 2004; June 30, 2004 – June 30, 2007; June 30, 2010 – June 30, 2013; June 30, 2013 – June 30, 2016; June 30, 2016 – June 30, 2019 |
| William Irwin Tieng | 5 | June 30, 2016 – June 30, 2019; June 30, 2019 – June 30, 2022 |
| Casimiro Sison | 6 | June 30, 1992 – June 30, 1995; June 30, 1998 – June 30, 2001; June 30, 2001 – June 30, 2004; June 30, 2004 – June 30, 2007; June 30, 2010 – June 30, 2013; June 30, 2013 – June 30, 2016; June 30, 2016 – June 30, 2019 |
| Elizabeth Rivera | 6 | June 30, 1998 – June 30, 2001; June 30, 2001 – June 30, 2004; June 30, 2004 – June 30, 2007; June 30, 2010 – June 30, 2013; June 30, 2013 – June 30, 2016; June 30, 2016 – June 30, 2019 |
| Priscilla Marie Abante-Barquia | 6 | June 30, 2013 – June 30, 2016; June 30, 2016 – June 30, 2019; June 30, 2019 – June 30, 2022 |
| Christian Paul Uy | 6 | June 30, 2013 – June 30, 2016; June 30, 2016 – June 30, 2019; June 30, 2019 – June 30, 2022 |
| Joel Par | 6 | June 30, 2013 – June 30, 2016; June 30, 2016 – June 30, 2019; June 30, 2019 – June 30, 2022 |
| Roberto Ortega, Jr. | 5 | June 30, 1998 – June 30, 2001; June 30, 2001 – June 30, 2004; June 30, 2004 – June 30, 2007; June 30, 2010 – June 30, 2013; June 30, 2013 – June 30, 2016; June 30, 2016 – June 30, 2019 |
| Ali Atienza | 5 | June 30, 2013 – June 30, 2016 |
| Roberto Asilo | 1 | June 30, 2013 – June 30, 2016 |
| Dennis Alcoreza | 1 | June 30, 2007 – June 30, 2010; June 30, 2010 – June 30, 2013; June 30, 2013 – June 30, 2016 |
| Ernesto M. Dionisio, Jr. | 1 | June 30, 2007 – June 30, 2010; June 30, 2010 – June 30, 2013; June 30, 2013 – June 30, 2016 |
| Yul Servo | 3 | June 30, 2007 – June 30, 2010; June 30, 2010 – June 30, 2013; June 30, 2013 – June 30, 2016 |
| Jocelyn J. Quintos | 4 | June 30, 2007 – June 30, 2010; June 30, 2010 – June 30, 2013; June 30, 2013 – June 30, 2016 |
| Cristina A. Isip | 5 | June 30, 2007 – June 30, 2010; June 30, 2010 – June 30, 2013; June 30, 2013 – June 30, 2016 |
| Josefina Siscar | 5 | June 30, 2007 – June 30, 2010; June 30, 2010 – June 30, 2013; June 30, 2013 – June 30, 2016 |
| Marlon Morales Lacson | 2 | June 30, 1995 – June 30, 1998; June 30, 1998 – June 30, 2001; June 30, 2001 – June 30, 2004; June 30, 2007 – June 30, 2010; June 30, 2010 – June 30, 2013; June 30, 2013 – June 30, 2016 |
| Edward V.P. Maceda | 4 | June 30, 1995 – June 30, 1998; June 30, 1998 – June 30, 2001; June 30, 2001 – June 30, 2004; June 30, 2007 – June 30, 2010; June 30, 2010 – June 30, 2013; June 30, 2013 – June 30, 2016 |
| Arlene Chua | 4 | June 30, 2013 – March 16, 2015 (term cut short citizenship issues) |
| Rafael P. Borromeo | 5 | June 30, 2007 – June 30, 2010; June 30, 2010 – June 30, 2013 |
| Ramon D. Morales | 3 | February 15, 2006 – June 30, 2007; June 30, 2007 – June 30, 2010; June 30, 2010 – June 30, 2013 |
| Maria Sheilah H. Lacuna-Pangan, FPDS | 4 | June 30, 2004 – June 30, 2007; June 30, 2007 – June 30, 2010; June 30, 2010 – June 30, 2013 |
| Arch. Danilo Victor H. Lacuna, Jr., EnP | 6 | June 30, 2004 – June 30, 2007; June 30, 2007 – June 30, 2010; June 30, 2010 – June 30, 2013 |
| Richard C. Ibay | 5 | June 30, 1998 – June 30, 2001; June 30, 2001 – June 30, 2004; June 30, 2004 – June 30, 2007; June 30, 2010 – June 30, 2013 |
| Jocelyn Dawis-Asuncion | 6 | June 30, 1995 – June 30, 1998; June 30, 1998 – June 30, 2001; June 30, 2001 – June 30, 2004; June 30, 2007 – June 30, 2010; June 30, 2010 – June 30, 2013 |
| Jocelyn Dawis-Asuncion | Sk President | June 30, 1994 – June 30, 1997 (Sangguniang Kabataan federation Manila Chapter) (Elected councilor 1995) |
| Corazon C. Gernale | 5 | June 30, 2007 – June 30, 2010 |
| Roderick Valbuena | 5 | June 30, 2007 – June 30, 2010 |
| Roberto B. Oca III | 3 | July 24, 2009 – June 30, 2010 |
| Arlene W. Koa | 1 | June 30, 2001 – June 30, 2004; June 30, 2004 – June 30, 2007; June 30, 2007 – June 30, 2010 |
| Amalia Tolentino | 4 | June 30, 2001 – June 30, 2004; June 30, 2004 – June 30, 2007; June 30, 2007 – June 30, 2010 |
| Ivy A. Varona | 2 | June 30, 2007 – June 30, 2010 |
| Carlo V. Lopez | 2 | June 30, 2007 – June 30, 2010 |
| Abelardo C. Viceo | 2 | June 30, 1995 – June 30, 1998; June 30, 1998 – June 30, 2001; June 30, 2004 – June 30, 2007; June 30, 2007 – June 30, 2010 |
| Ma. Lourdes Isip-Garcia | 6 | June 30, 1992 – June 30, 1995; June 30, 1995 – June 30, 1998; June 30, 2004 – June 30, 2007; June 30, 2007 – June 30, 2010 |
| Victoriano A. Melendez | 4 | February 3, 1988 – June 30, 1992; June 30, 1992 – June 30, 1995; June 30, 1995 – June 30, 1998; June 30, 2001 – June 30, 2004; June 30, 2004 – June 30, 2007; June 30, 2007 – June 30, 2010 |
| Ernesto F. Rivera | 6 | February 3, 1988 – June 30, 1992; June 30, 1992 – June 30, 1995; June 30, 1995 – June 30, 1998; June 30, 2007 – June 30, 2010 |
| Monina U. Silva | 3 | June 30, 2004 – June 30, 2007; June 30, 2007 – July 23, 2009 (Died in office) |
| Rolando Y. Sy | 1 | June 30, 2007 – November 30, 2008 |
| Greco Belgica | 6 | June 30, 2004 – June 30, 2007 |
| Benjamin D. Asilo | 1 | June 30, 2001 – June 30, 2004; June 30, 2004 – June 30, 2007 |
| Nelissa F. Beltran | 2 | June 30, 2001 – June 30, 2004; June 30, 2004 – June 30, 2007 |
| Juan Miguel T. Cuna | 5 | June 30, 2001 – June 30, 2004; June 30, 2004 – June 30, 2007 |
| Isko Moreno Domagoso | 1 | June 30, 1998 – June 30, 2001; June 30, 2001 – June 30, 2004; June 30, 2004 – June 30, 2007 |
| Pacifico Laxa | 2 | June 30, 1998 – June 30, 2001; June 30, 2001 – June 30, 2004; June 30, 2004 – June 30, 2007 |
| Ma. Theresa B. Bonoan-David | 4 | June 30, 1998 – June 30, 2001; June 30, 2001 – June 30, 2004; June 30, 2004 – June 30, 2007 |
| Ricardo S. Isip, Sr. | 5 | June 30, 1998 – June 30, 2001; June 30, 2001 – June 30, 2004; June 30, 2004 – June 30, 2007 |
| Cita P. Astals | 5 | June 30, 1998 – June 30, 2001; June 30, 2001 – June 30, 2004; June 30, 2004 – June 30, 2007 |
| Roger G. Gernale | 5 | June 30, 1995 – June 30, 1998; June 30, 1998 – June 30, 2001; June 30, 2004 – June 30, 2007 |
| Alex C. Co | 3 | February 3, 1988 – June 30, 1992; June 30, 1995 – June 30, 1998; June 30, 1998 – June 30, 2001; June 30, 2004 – June 30, 2007 |
| Jhosep Lopez (SC Justice January 26, 2021 – present) | 3 | June 30, 1992 – June 30, 1995; June 30, 1995 – June 30, 1998; June 30, 2001 – June 30, 2004; June 30, 2004 – June 30, 2007 (City Prosecutor of Manila February 14, 2006 – May 12, 2017) (CA Justice May 17, 2012 – January 26, 2021) |
| Danilo Varona | 2 | June 30, 1998 – June 30, 2001; June 30, 2001 – June 30, 2004 |
| Don Ramon A. Bagatsing | 4 | June 30, 1998 – June 30, 2001; June 30, 2001 – June 30, 2004 |
| Patrick S. Ocampo | 6 | June 30, 1998 – June 30, 2001; June 30, 2001 – June 30, 2004 |
| Larry Silva | 3 | June 30, 1995 – June 30, 1998; June 30, 1998 – June 30, 2001; June 30, 2001 – June 30, 2004 |
| Miles Andrew M. Roces | 3 | June 30, 1995 – June 30, 1998; June 30, 1998 – June 30, 2001; June 30, 2001 – June 30, 2004 |
| Kim Atienza | 5 | June 30, 1995 – June 30, 1998; June 30, 1998 – June 30, 2001; June 30, 2001 – June 30, 2004 |
| Abraham Cabochan | 1 | February 3, 1988 – June 30, 1992; June 30, 1995 – June 30, 1998; June 30, 1998 – June 30, 2001; June 30, 2001 – June 30, 2004 |
| Julio E. Logarta, Jr. | 6 | February 3, 1988 – June 30, 1992; June 30, 1995 – June 30, 1998; June 30, 1998 – June 30, 2001; June 30, 2001 – June 30, 2004 |
| Nicolas R. Monzon | 1 | June 30, 1998-April 16, 1999 (Died in office) |
| Ernesto P. Logarta, Jr. | 3 | June 30, 1998 – June 30, 2001 |
| Gonzalo Gonzales | 1 | June 30, 1992 – June 30, 1995; June 30, 1995 – June 30, 1998; June 30, 1998 – June 30, 2001 |
| Ma. Paz E. Herrera | 4 | June 30, 1992 – June 30, 1995; June 30, 1995 – June 30, 1998; June 30, 1998 – June 30, 2001 |
| Gerino A. Tolentino, Jr. | 4 | June 30, 1992 – June 30, 1995; June 30, 1995 – June 30, 1998; June 30, 1998 – June 30, 2001 |
| Alberto A. Domingo | 1 | February 3, 1988 – June 30, 1992; June 30, 1992 – June 30, 1995; May 1, 1999 – June 30, 2001 |
| Rodolfo C. Bacani | 4 | June 30, 1995 – June 30, 1998 |
| Pablo Dario G. Ocampo IV | 5 | June 30, 1995 – June 30, 1998 |
| Grepor B. Belgica | 6 | June 30, 1995 – June 30, 1998 |
| Roberto C. Ocampo, Sr. | 1 | June 30, 1992 – June 30, 1995; June 30, 1995 – June 30, 1998 |
| Avelino S. Cailian | 1 | June 30, 1992 – June 30, 1995; June 30, 1995 – June 30, 1998 |
| Danilo V. Roleda | 4 | June 30, 1992 – June 30, 1995; June 30, 1995 – June 30, 1998 |
| Jose "Joey" D. Hizon, Jr. | 5 | June 30, 1992 – June 30, 1995; June 30, 1995 – June 30, 1998 |
| Felixberto D. Espiritu | 5 | June 30, 1992 – June 30, 1995; June 30, 1995 – June 30, 1998 |
| Ernesto A. Nieva | 1 | February 3, 1988 – June 30, 1992; June 30, 1992 – June 30, 1995; June 30, 1995 – June 30, 1998 |
| Nestor C. Ponce, Jr. | 2 | February 3, 1988 – June 30, 1992; June 30, 1992 – June 30, 1995; June 30, 1995 – June 30, 1998 |
| Francisco G. Varona, Jr. | 2 | February 3, 1988 – June 30, 1992; June 30, 1992 – June 30, 1995; June 30, 1995 – June 30, 1998 |
| Flaviano F. Concepcion, Jr. | 2 | February 3, 1988 – June 30, 1992; June 30, 1992 – June 30, 1995; June 30, 1995 – June 30, 1998 |
| Humberto B. Basco | 2 | February 3, 1988 – June 30, 1992; June 30, 1992 – June 30, 1995; June 30, 1995 – June 30, 1998 |
| Pedro S. De Jesus | 3 | February 3, 1988 – June 30, 1992; June 30, 1992 – June 30, 1995; June 30, 1995 – June 30, 1998 |
| Rogelio P. Dela Paz | 5 | February 3, 1988 – June 30, 1992; June 30, 1992 – June 30, 1995; June 30, 1995 – June 30, 1998 |
| Honorio Lopez II | 1 | June 30, 1992 – June 30, 1995 |
| Chika G. Go | 3 | June 30, 1992 – June 30, 1995 |
| Manuel L. Quin | 3 | June 30, 1992 – June 30, 1995 |
| Estrella S. Querubin | 5 | June 30, 1992 – June 30, 1995 |
| Bernardo D. Ragasa | 5 | June 30, 1992 – June 30, 1995 |
| Alexander S. Ricafort | 6 | June 30, 1992 – June 30, 1995 |
| Benny Abante | 6 | June 30, 1992 – June 30, 1995 |
| Romeo G. Rivera | 2 | February 3, 1988 – June 30, 1992; June 30, 1992 – June 30, 1995 |
| Romualdo S. Maranan | 2 | February 3, 1988 – June 30, 1992; June 30, 1992 – June 30, 1995 |
| Ernesto V. P. Maceda, Jr. | 4 | February 3, 1988 – June 30, 1992; June 30, 1992 – June 30, 1995 |
| Rolando P. Nieto | 4 | February 3, 1988 – June 30, 1992; June 30, 1992 – June 30, 1995 |
| Karlo A. Butiong | 5 | February 3, 1988 – June 30, 1992; June 30, 1992 – June 30, 1995 |
| Ma. Corazon P. Caballes | 6 | February 3, 1988 – June 30, 1992; June 30, 1992 – June 30, 1995 |
| Marites H. Martinez | 3 | October 15, 1988 – June 30, 1992 |
| Pedro Alfonso | 1 | February 3, 1988 – June 30, 1992 |
| Rosenda Ann M. Ocampo | 6 | February 3, 1988 – June 30, 1992 |
| Reynaldo B. Jose | 1 | February 3, 1988 – June 30, 1992 |
| Saturnino C. Herrera | 3 | February 3 – October 14, 1988 (Died in office) |
| Susana M. Ong | 3 | February 3, 1988 – June 30, 1992 |
| Nemesio C. Garcia | 3 | February 3, 1988 – June 30, 1992 |
| Emilio C. Bonoan | 4 | February 3, 1988 – June 30, 1992 |
| Eduardo Quintos V | 4 | February 3, 1988 – June 30, 1992 |
| Jaime de la Rosa | 4 | February 3, 1988 – June 30, 1992 |
| Susano F. Gonzalez, Jr. | 5 | February 3, 1988 – June 30, 1992 |
| Rufino S. Bunsoy | 5 | February 3, 1988 – June 30, 1992 |
| Ponciano D. Subido | 5 | February 3, 1988 – June 30, 1992 |
| Arturo E. Valenzona | 5 | February 3, 1988 – June 30, 1992 |
| Benedicto D. Dorado | 6 | February 3, 1988 – June 30, 1992 |
| Manuel S. Isip | 6 | February 3, 1988 – June 30, 1992 |
| Marissa Papa | Liga President | June 30, 2007 – November 30, 2007-(Liga ng Mga Barangay Manila Chapter) |
| Natalio F. Beltran III | Liga President | June 30, 1998 – June 30, 2002; June 30, 2002 – June 30, 2004-(Liga ng Mga Barangay Manila Chapter) |
| Luningning F. Go | Liga President | June 30, 1994 – June 30, 1997-(Liga ng Mga Barangay Manila Chapter) |
| Leonardo Angat | Liga President | June 30, 1989 – June 30, 1994-(Liga ng Mga Barangay Manila Chapter) |
| Tagumpay Eusebio | Liga President | February 3, 1988 – June 30, 1989-(Liga ng Mga Barangay Manila Chapter) |
| Daniel Dave Tan | SK President | June 30, 2018 – November 30, 2023 (Sangguniang Kabataan federation Manila Chapter) |
| Eunice Ann Denice Castro | Sk President | November 30, 2010 – November 30, 2013 (Sangguniang Kabataan federation Manila Chapter) |
| John Russell Ibay | Sk President | November 30, 2007 – November 30, 2010 (Sangguniang Kabataan federation Manila Chapter) |
| Francesca Gernale | Sk President | June 30, 2004 – November 30, 2007 (Sangguniang Kabataan federation Manila Chapter) |
| Fercival Florendo | Sk President | June 30, 1998 – June 30, 2002; June 30, 2002 – June 30, 2004 (Sangguniang Kabataan federation Manila Chapter) |

| Name | District | Term | |
| Name | District | From | To |
|---|---|---|---|
| Rosalina Robles–Gonzales | 1 | January 1, 1972 | December 31, 1975 |
| Mel Lopez | 1 | December 30, 1967 | December 31, 1975 |
| Cesar T. Lucero Jr. | 1 | December 30, 1967 | December 31, 1975 |
| Ben Rubio Ronquillo | 1 | December 30, 1967 | December 31, 1975 |
| Ambrosio L. Lorenzo Jr. | 2 | December 30, 1967 | December 31, 1975 |
| Alfonso V. Mendoza Jr. | 2 | December 30, 1967 | December 31, 1975 |
| Hermogenes Pablo | 2 | December 30, 1967 | December 31, 1975 |
| Danilo Lacuna | 3 | December 30, 1967 | December 31, 1975 |
| Carlos Loyzaga | 3 | December 30, 1967 | December 31, 1975 |
| Avelina V. Villacorta | 3 | December 30, 1967 | December 31, 1975 |
| Jose S. Brillantes | 4 | December 30, 1967 | December 31, 1975 |
| Manuel S. Isip | 4 | December 30, 1967 | December 31, 1975 |
| Gonzalo Puyat II | 4 | December 30, 1967 | December 31, 1975 |
| Manuel Uy, Jr. | 4 | December 30, 1967 | December 31, 1975 |
| Jose Pete Villanueva | 4 | December 30, 1967 | December 31, 1975 |
| Jose M. Sembrano | 1 | December 30, 1967 | December 31, 1975 |
| Martin B. Isidro, Sr. | 1 | December 30, 1959 | December 31, 1975 |
| Apolonio V. Gener | 2 | December 30, 1959 | December 31, 1975 |
| Mariano M. Magsalin | 3 | December 30, 1959 | December 31, 1975 |
| Eduardo Quintos, Jr. | 3 | December 30, 1959 | December 31, 1975 |
| Francis P. Yuseco | 2 | December 30, 1959 | December 31, 1975 |
| Ernesto Maceda, Sr. | 3 | December 30, 1959 | December 30, 1967 |
| Eriberto A. Remigio | 3 | December 30, 1959 | December 30, 1967 |
| Vicente G. Cruz | 3 | December 30, 1959 | December 30, 1967 |
| Pablo V. Ocampo | 4 | December 30, 1959 | December 30, 1967 |
| Leonardo B. Fugoso | 2 | December 30, 1959 | December 30, 1967 |
| Gonzalo Santos Rivera | 4 | December 30, 1959 | December 30, 1967 |
| Francisco G. Varona, Jr | 2 | December 30, 1959 | December 30, 1967 |
| Francisco Gatmaitan | | December 30, 1959 | December 30, 1967 |
| Alfredo R. Gomez | | December 30, 1959 | December 30, 1967 |
| Pedro S. De Jesus | 3 | December 30, 1959 | December 30, 1967 |
| Felicisimo R. Cabigao | 3 | December 30, 1959 | December 30, 1967 |
| Fidel Santiago | 1 | December 30, 1959 | December 30, 1967 |
| Herminio A. Astorga | 4 | December 30, 1959 | April16, 1962 |
| Alfonso Altiveros | 2 | January 1, 1972 | December 31, 1975 |

| Name | Term | |
| Name | From | To |
|---|---|---|
| Isabelo de los Reyes | October 3, 1912 | October 3, 1919 |
| Carmen Planas | January 1, 1934 | January 4, 1940 |
| Hermenegildo Atienza | January 1, 1934 | January 4, 1940 |
| Valeriano E. Fugoso, Sr. | January 1, 1934 | January 4, 1940 |
| Manuel dela Fuente | January 1, 1934 | January 4, 1940 |
| Eustaquio Balagtas | January 1, 1934 | January 4, 1940 |
| Bartolome Gatmaitan | January 1, 1934 | January 4, 1940 |
| Mateo Herrera | January 1, 1934 | January 4, 1940 |
| Teofilo Mendoza | January 1, 1934 | January 4, 1940 |
| Iñigo Ed. Regalado | January 1, 1934 | January 4, 1940 |
| Agaton Cecilio | January 1, 1934 | January 4, 1940 |

== Floor Leaders ==
=== Pro-Tempore ===
| Name | Term |
|---|---|
| Ernesto Isip Jr. | June 30, 2019 – June 30, 2022 |
| Irma Alfonso Juson | June 30, 2022 – September 2024 |
| Macario Lacson | September 2024 – June 30, 2025 |
| Timothy Oliver Zarcal | June 30, 2025 – present |

=== Majority ===
| Name | Term |
|---|---|
| Joel R. Chua | June 30, 2019 – June 30, 2022 |
| Ernesto Isip Jr. | June 30, 2022 – June 30, 2025 |
| Raymond Yupangco | June 30, 2025 – present |

=== Minority ===
| Name | Term |
|---|---|
| Ernesto Dionisio, Sr. | June 30, 2019 – June 30, 2022 |
| Philip Lacuna | June 30, 2022 – September 2024 |
| Joel "JTV" Villanueva | September 2024 – June 30, 2025 |
| Don Juan Bagatsing | June 30, 2025 – present |

== Controversies ==
In October 2025 privilege speech, Councilor Eunice Castro accused fellow councilor Ryan Ponce of sexually harassing her. She stated that she just greeted her, and signaled him to have a high five, but when she lowered her hand, he poked it again. It turns out after searching online that the "massage" focuses on the female genitalia. Also, there's some instances that Ponce would allegedly threw lewd comments about her clothing. Ponce later apologized, but the council's ethics committee led by Jaybee Hizon initiated a probe with the directive from the presiding officer. Laguna Congresswoman and House Committee on Women head Rene Ann Matibag called for probe and condemned the said harassment. Matibag also called for strict implementation of Safe Spaces Act.
