= Pablo V. Ocampo =

Filipino lawyer and politician (1925–2021)

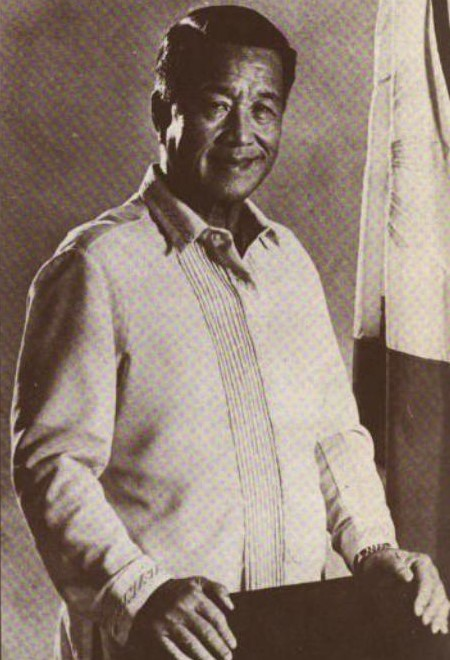
- Ocampo's official portrait during the 8th Congress

Member of the Philippine House of Representatives from Manila
- In office June 30, 1987 – June 30, 1992
- Preceded by: District established
- Succeeded by: Sandy Ocampo
- Constituency: 6th district
- In office December 30, 1965 – January 17, 1973
- Preceded by: Justo Albert
- Succeeded by: District abolished (seat later held by Ramon Bagatsing Jr. in 1987)
- Constituency: 4th district

Member of the Manila City Council
- In office December 30, 1959 – December 30, 1965

Personal details
- Born: May 12, 1925 Manila, Philippine Islands
- Died: December 9, 2021 (aged 96)
- Party: NPC (1991–2021)
- Other political affiliations: LDP (1988–1991); PDP–Laban (1984–1988); Nacionalista (1959–1973)
- Spouse: Gloria Malabanan
- Children: 8
- Education: University of the Philippines (AA); Manila Law College (LLB); Far Eastern University (AB); University of Michigan (LLM)

Pablo Villaroman Ocampo (May 12, 1925 – December 9, 2021) was a Filipino lawyer and politician who served as the representative for Manila's 6th congressional district in the Philippine House of Representatives from 1987 to 1992. He previously represented Manila's 4th district from 1965 to 1973.

== Early life and education ==
Pablo Villaroman Ocampo was born on May 12, 1925, in Malate, Manila, as the fifth child of former city judge Jesus Ocampo and lawyer Rosenda Villaroman. He was a grandson of Pablo Ocampo, the first resident commissioner of the Philippines to the United States.

He attended Saint Scholastica College, San Beda College, and Ateneo de Manila University, where he completed his secondary education and earned an Associate in Arts degree in 1943. He later attended Manila Law College, where he earned a Bachelor of Laws degree in 1949, and took courses in business administration and foreign service at Far Eastern University, completing them in 1951. Ocampo also pursued postgraduate studies in law at the University of Michigan and took courses in speechmaking and public relations at the Dale Carnegie School in New York.

== Legal career ==
Ocampo began his legal career at the law firm of Senator Claro M. Recto. He later established his own law office and taught at law schools in Manila.

== Manila City Council (1959–1965) ==
Ocampo was elected to the Manila City Council in 1959 and re-elected in 1963. He served until December 1965, when he was elected to the House of Representatives. As a councilor, he authored measures providing for free education and textbooks in public high schools and the abolition of tuition fees and school contributions. He also proposed the purchase of landed estates for resale to their tenant occupants. Ocampo sponsored the establishment of the City University of Manila and community projects benefiting the public. During his tenure, he received several recognitions as an outstanding councilor from press associations.

== House of Representatives (1965–1973, 1987–1992) ==
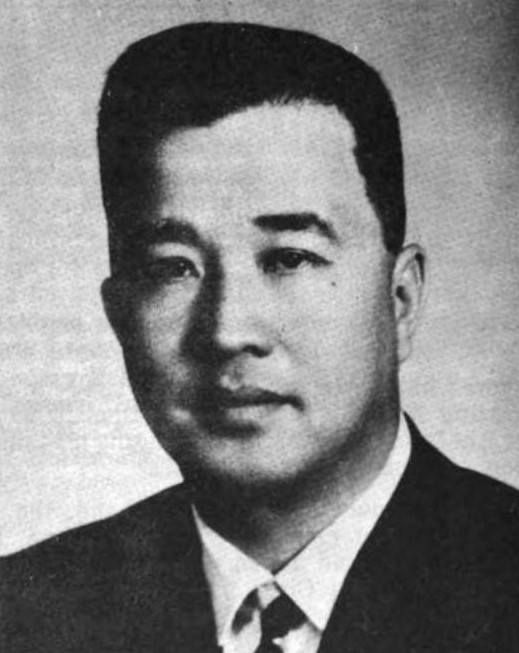
Ocampo's official portrait during the 6th Congress

=== First term (1965–1969) ===
Ocampo was first elected to the House of Representatives in 1965, representing Manila's 4th congressional district and defeating incumbent Justo Albert. During the 6th Congress, he served as a member of six House committees.

=== Second term (1969–1973) ===
Ocampo was re-elected in 1969. His term was scheduled to end in December 1973 but was cut short following the ratification of the 1973 Constitution in January of that year abolishing Congress, after President Ferdinand Marcos had declared martial law.

=== Third term (1987–1992) ===
Ocampo was elected to the restored House of Representatives in 1987 under PDP–Laban, representing Manila's newly created 6th congressional district. During the 8th Congress, he served as an assistant majority floor leader under Majority Leader Francisco Sumulong.

== Post-congressional career ==
After his third term in the House, Ocampo ran for mayor of Manila in the 1992 elections under the Nationalist People's Coalition, but lost to Alfredo Lim. He sought another term as representative in 2001 but lost to Mark Jimenez.

== Death ==
Ocamp died on December 9, 2021.

== Personal life ==
Ocampo was married to Gloria Malabanan, with whom he had eight children, including Sandy, who succeeded him as representative for Manila's 6th district, and Pablo IV, who became a member of the Manila City Council.

== Electoral history ==
Electoral history of Pablo V. Ocampo
Year	Office	Party	Votes received				Result
Year	Office	Party	Total	%	P.	Swing	Result
1959	Councilor (Manila)	Nacionalista	—N/a	—N/a	—N/a	—N/a	Won
1963	Councilor (Manila)	Nacionalista	—N/a	—N/a	—N/a	—N/a	Won
1965	Representative (Manila–4th)	Nacionalista	34,016	38.56%	1st	—N/a	Won
1969	Representative (Manila–4th)	Nacionalista	—N/a	—N/a	1st	—N/a	Won
1984	Mambabatas Pambansa (Assemblyman) from Manila	PDP–Laban	109,915	—N/a	13th	—N/a	Lost
1987	Representative (Manila–6th)	PDP–Laban	—N/a	—N/a	1st	—N/a	Won
2001	Representative (Manila–6th)	NPC	30,038	35.09%	2nd	—N/a	Lost
1992	Mayor of Manila	NPC	54,353	7.57%	5th	—N/a	Lost

House of Representatives of the Philippines
New district	Member of the Philippine House of Representatives for Manila's 6th district 1987–1992	Succeeded by Sandy Ocampo
Preceded by Justo Albert	Member of the Philippine House of Representatives for Manila's 4th district 1965–1973	Vacant Martial law and adoption of the 1973 Constitution Title next held by Ramon Bagatsing Jr.
