= Ramon Bagatsing =

Mayor of Manila from 1972 to 1986

The Honorable Ramon D. Bagatsing, Sr.
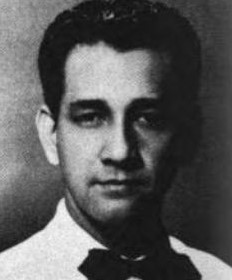
- Bagatsing official portrait during the 5th Congress.

19th Mayor of Manila
- In office January 1, 1972 – February 28, 1986
- Vice Mayor: Martin Isidro (1972–1975); James Barbers (1976–1986)
- Preceded by: Antonio Villegas
- Succeeded by: Mel Lopez (OIC)

3rd President of the University of the City of Manila
- In office June 1, 1978 – October 27, 1982
- Preceded by: Consuelo Blanco
- Succeeded by: Jose Villanueva

Member of the House of Representatives of the Philippines from Manila's 3rd district
- In office December 30, 1957 – December 30, 1965
- Preceded by: Arturo Tolentino
- Succeeded by: Sergio Loyola
- In office December 30, 1969 – January 1, 1972
- Preceded by: Sergio Loyola
- Succeeded by: Vacant; Post later held by Leonardo Fugoso

Personal details
- Born: Ramon Delaraga Bagatsing; August 19, 1916 Sagay, Negros Occidental, Philippines (Note: The Philippines was an unincorporated territory of the United States known as the Philippine Islands at the time of Bagatsing's birth.)
- Died: February 14, 2006 (aged 89) Muntinlupa, Metro Manila, Philippines
- Resting place: Manila South Cemetery, Makati, Metro Manila, Philippines
- Party: LDP (1992); KBL (1978–1986); Liberal (1957–1978)
- Spouses: Corazon Belmonte (m. 1939; died 1944) Juanita Sevilla (m. 1944; died 1998)
- Domestic partner: Zenaida Lazaro
- Children: 13, including (Ramon "Boy" B. Bagatsing, Jr., Ramon "Don Don" S. Bagatsing, Jr. and Amado S. Bagatsing)
- Relatives: Don Juan Bagatsing (grandson); Cristal Bagatsing (granddaughter); Ramon "Raymond" S. Bagatsing, III (grandson); RK Bagatsing (grandson); Hyram Bagatsing (grandson)
- Education: Philippine Law School (LL.M, DCL)
- Occupation: Politician
- Profession: Lawyer
- Awards: American Defense Ribbon; Philippine Defense Ribbon; Philippine Liberation Medal; Asiatic-Pacific Campaign Medal; Plaque of the Silver

Military service
- Allegiance: Philippines; United States
- Branch/service: USAFFE
- Years of service: 1941–1946
- Rank: Major
- Battles/wars: World War II
- Police career
- Allegiance: Philippines
- Department: Manila Police Department
- Service years: 1939–1941
- Rank: Patrolman

Ramon Delaraga Bagatsing Sr. (August 19, 1916 – February 14, 2006) was a Filipino politician. He was the only Filipino of Indian ancestry and person with disability (an amputee) who served as 19th Mayor of Manila from 1971 to 1986. Bagatsing held the unique distinction of being the only person to survive both the Bataan Death March and the Plaza Miranda bombing in 1971. He was a military hero for the Liberation of Manila during the Second World War, and was a founding chairman of the Philippine Anti-Communist League under the Asian Peoples' Anti-Communist League (APACL).

Before occupying the city's highest office, Bagatsing served as a representative to Congress for Manila, member of Cabinet, lawyer, lay minister, and policeman. He earned the moniker "The Incorruptible" for his clean record in public service and for his unwavering anti-graft and corruption stance.

== Early life and military career ==
Bagatsing was born on August 19, 1916, in Fabrica, Sagay, to an ethnic Filipino mother Dionisia Delaraga and Amado Bagatsing, a Punjabi immigrant from British India. His father, originally named Mataram Siṅgh Baṅgā (Punjabi: ਬੰਗਾ), had arrived after the bloody effects of British rule and who, later inspired by the deeds of famous Indian revolutionary Bhagat Siṅgh, founded the Manila chapter of the Indian Ghadar Party. Thereafter, he changed his name to Amado Bhagat Siṅgh (Punjabi: ਭਗਤ ਸਿੰਘ), of which the Hiligaynon form Bagatsing has since become the standard spelling for the Philippine branch of the family. The young Ramon worked as a bus conductor, night watchman, and security guard to augment his basic and school expenses. To escape the hardships of poverty, he left his home province for Manila. Bagatsing began his stint as a patrolman with the Manila Police Department from 1939 to 1941.

When the Second World War broke out in 1941, he enlisted with the United States Army Forces in the Far East (USAFFE). He began as a first sergeant from 1941 to 1943, was promoted to first lieutenant in 1944, then to captain in 1945, and major in 1946. He is a survivor of the Bataan Death March, where he was able to escape from soldiers of the Imperial Japanese Army.

For his military service, Bagatsing was awarded the American Defense Ribbon, the Philippine Defense Ribbon, the Philippine Liberation Medal, the Asiatic-Pacific Campaign Medal, and the Plaque of the Silver Kris of the Philippine Veterans Federation. He was National Commander of the Defenders of Bataan and Corregidor and a member of the Philippine Veterans Legion, American Legion, and American Disabled Veterans.

== Corporate and political life ==
With the war over, he continued his law studies while working as the driver of the company bus of Elizalde & Co. From 1947 to 1957, he climbed the corporate ladder to become the company's Public Relations and Personnel Manager, and during the same period, passed the bar examinations and became a lawyer. He was also a bank safe and home safety box salesman.

Bagatsing first entered public service in the 1957 elections when his province mate, then-presidential candidate and former Speaker of the House of Representatives of the Philippines José Yulo, convinced him to run for Congress in Manila's then third district of Sampaloc, Santa Mesa (then part of Sampaloc), and San Miguel. He was elected Congressman for the first time and became chairman of the House Veterans Committee. He was re-elected in 1961 and held the chairmanship of the powerful Justice Committee. As a legislator, Bagatsing authored several laws, such as the Philippine Veterans Act, the National Stud Farm Law, the laws creating the Bureau of Immigration, the Integrated Bar of the Philippines, the National Defense College of the Philippines and the Eulogio "Amang" Rodríguez Institute of Science and Technology, among others.

After his second term, he joined the Cabinet, becoming the country's chief graft-buster as Head of the Presidential Agency on Reforms and Government Operations (PARGO) from 1967 to 1969. During his stint at PARGO, Bagatsing was dubbed by the Philippine Free Press as "The Incorruptible" for his prosecution of several high-profile corruption cases against prominent and high-ranking officials, including the conviction and expulsion of a city mayor for graft.

In 1969, he ran again for his old congressional seat in Manila and was overwhelmingly elected to a third term. During his ten years, or three terms, in the Philippine House of Representatives, Bagatsing was consistently awarded and included in the lists of the country's "Ten Most Outstanding Congressmen" and "The 10 Most Useful Legislators of the Republic". He was a leading reformer and a relentless crusader against the spread of communism in the Asia-Pacific region of the world as the founding chairman of the Philippine Anti-Communist League.

=== Plaza Miranda bombing; Mayor of Manila ===
Bagatsing was one of the survivors of the Plaza Miranda bombing on August 21, 1971, which was at that time considered one of the bloodiest political massacres in Philippine history. Nine were killed and almost a hundred more—including Bagatsing—were wounded after two grenades were thrown on the stage by still-unknown assailants. The public rally was meant to be Bagatsing's official proclamation as mayoral candidate for Manila of the opposition Liberal Party. He was among the three most critically injured, along with Senators Jovito Salonga and Sergio Osmeña, Jr., who nearly lost their lives as they were front and center on the elevated platform, which was the epicenter of the bomb blast. Others who were also hurt included prominent Philippine politicians such as Gerardo Roxas, Eva Estrada-Kalaw, Genaro Magsaysay, Ramon Mitra Jr., Eddie Ilarde, Salipada Pendatun, Roberto Oca Jr. and John Osmeña.

Bagatsing was briefly clinically dead until he was revived by emergency medical staff in the hospital, being confined for almost three months while undergoing numerous delicate operations. Shrapnel fragments damaged Bagatsing's lower abdomen, right arm, and right cheek bone, and Bagatsing's leg was amputated, badly damaging also his abdomen, right cheek bone and right arm. His wife, Juanita, was also hurt in the blast, with shrapnel embedding her stomach, thighs, and hands. This became a rallying point that galvanized support for their party and their electoral campaign.

In the 1971 local elections, Bagatsing defeated incumbent Mayor Antonio Villegas for the mayoralty of the City of Manila. After winning the mayoralty, he left his congressional seat vacant until Congress was abolished by the declaration of martial law in the Philippines. Early in his fifteen-year term, he established the first Barangay Bureau in the Philippines, creating the blueprint for the barangay (village) system as the basic socio-political unit for Manila. This was quickly replicated by the national government and still survives to this day. He also set up the Manila Youth Bureau and the Tourism Office of Manila, which was a first for any local government.

Bagatsing then spearheaded the awarding of land titles to many of the city's indigent landless families and the poor He also established several multi-sectoral cooperatives eenefiting the vendors in the city's public markets, providing vital financial assistance and livelihood opportunities for Manila's less fortunate citizens.

Many schools, educational institutions, hospitals, health centers, public markets, daycare centers, roads and public parks were built and developed in his incumbency, among them, the Ospital ng Sampaloc, the College of Medicine Building of PLM or the Pamantasan ng Lungsod ng Maynila, the Plaza Noli, the Rajah Sulayman Plaza, the bigger Manila Public Library, the Dapitan Sports Complex, Tondo High School and other public schools. Bagatsing, an early environmentalist, embarked on a massive citywide tree planting program, personally planting, even watering, most of the trees in and around the Manila City Hall and across the entire stretch of España Boulevard, as well as, the coconut trees on the famous bay-walk of Roxas Boulevard along Manila Bay.

The City of Manila was at the height of its stature during most of Bagatsing's leadership as Makati and Quezon City were still largely undeveloped. It was during this time that Manila, once again, became the capital city of the Philippines, through an executive order by then President Ferdinand Marcos, and evolved to be the center of the country's cultural scene with the advent of the so-called disco-craze and the popular Manila Sound, while classic films from the period such as Manila in the Claws of Light and Manila by Night highlighted the economic inequality present in the city.

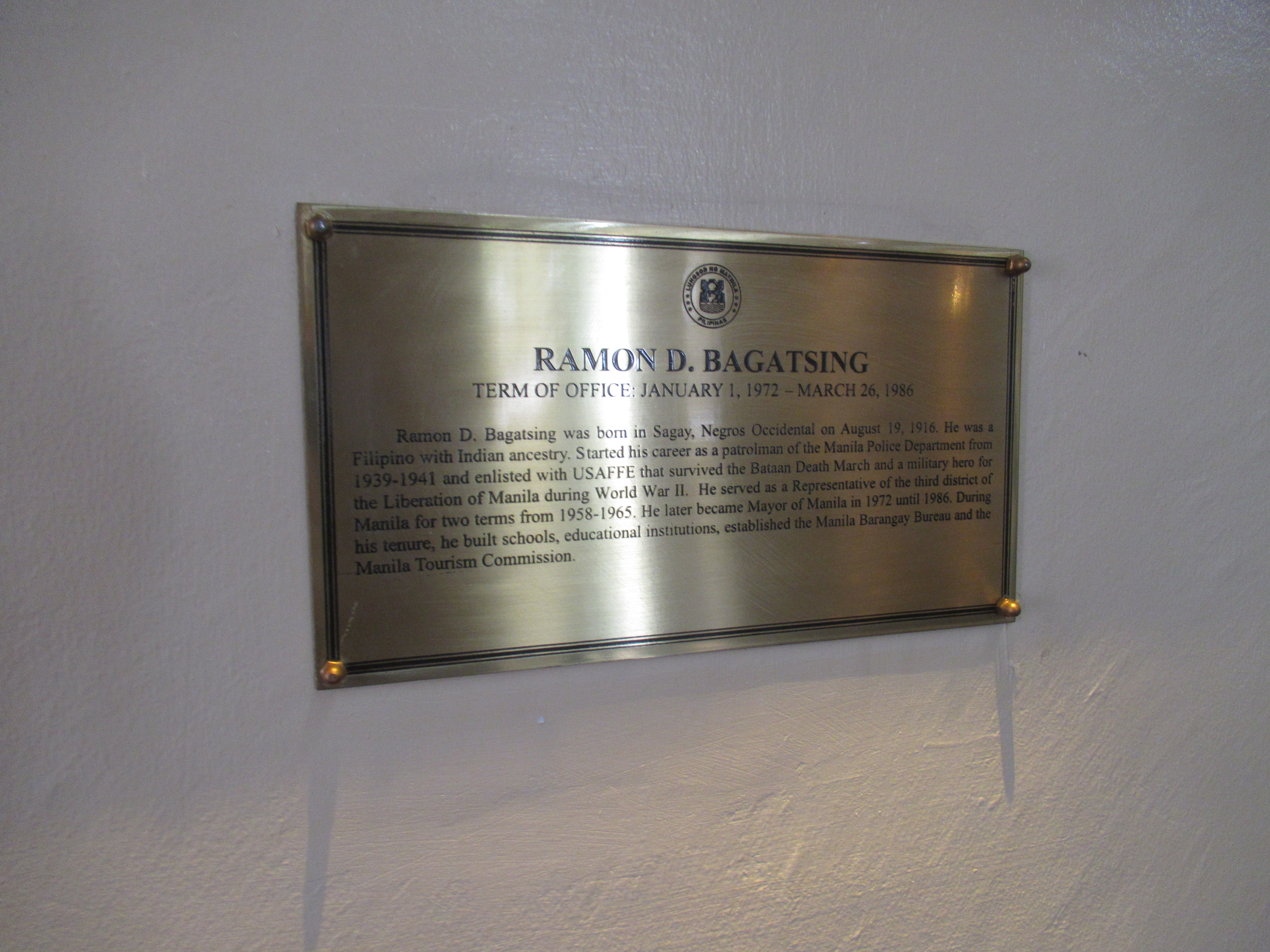
Manila City Hall

It was also during this period that Manila gained further prominence in the international spectrum, becoming the first city in Asia to host the Miss Universe 1974 pageant that saw Spanish beauty Amparo Muñoz win the title, crowned by Filipina Margarita Moran, Miss Universe 1973. Just days prior to the main event, in order to emphasize and promote the core essence of the Miss Universe movement's advocacy, cause, and purpose, Bagatsing had organised a local festival featuring a splendid procession of select pageant candidates parading around and throughout Manila's inner-streets, communities, and barangays, with the aim of bringing closer together the foreign international beauties and the city's common folk. A pioneer, Bagatsing was among the first City Mayors to establish a Manila Tourism bureau.

The following year, adding to its global acclaim, the city's name became renowned in the sporting world due to the Thrilla in Manila between Muhammad Ali and Joe Frazier. The legendary match was actually held at the Araneta Coliseum in Quezon City, but the promoters decided to highlight the City of Manila, with Ali enjoying his stay at the historic Manila Hotel, often jogging around the boulevards of Manila, mingling and interacting with the locals. Because of this, Bagatsing gladly provided Ali with a rather large security detail and even accompanied the American boxer to some of his training sessions.

In December 1979, Manila Avenue in Jersey City, New Jersey, the first main thoroughfare in the United States named after the Philippine capital, is inaugurated by Bagatsing together with members of the Jersey City Council before an elated Filipino-American community. Due to their collective effort, the former Grove Boulevard had been rechristened Manila Avenue upon adoption of local Jersey City Ordinance S-326, which further cemented the partnership among the two major cities and was considered a milestone in global intercity relations and diplomacy.

Immediately after advancing Manila's presence in the East Atlantic Seaboard, Bagatsing then focused towards the Pacific side, strengthening its close ties with the City and Borough of San Francisco, overseeing many mutual economic and cultural exchanges involving the two key bay cities, including high-profile back-to-back official missions and "sister-city summits" between then-San Francisco Mayor, now U.S. Senator, Dianne Feinstein and Mayor Bagatsing who visited each other's city, of which emanated a friendship that remained even following their respective mayoral incumbencies.

Bagatsing, a Liberal Party stalwart, was able to keep his post during the entire martial law years by maintaining his clean public service record. He was also one of the first officials to voluntarily step down to allow for a leadership transition after the 1986 People Power Revolution.

In 1988, Bagatsing ran for Mayor but the latter withdrew his candidacy.

In 1992, he tried to run for Mayor again under Laban ng Demokratikong Pilipino (LDP), but placed third losing to Alfredo Lim by a margin of 89,503.

== Charity and civic work ==
Bagatsing held several leadership roles in various charitable institutions, such as:

- International Director and Governor of the Lions Clubs International
- Chairman of the Philippine Red Cross Manila
- Grand Knight of the Knights of Columbus Organization
- Director of the Philippine Jaycees and the Manila Junior Chamber

In 1958, Bagatsing founded one of the largest scholarship programs of that time, the Ramon D. Bagatsing Scholarship Foundation, providing thousands of citizens the chance to receive quality education. He also had a genuine concern for persons with disabilities, and through the Mahaveer Foundation, would often help underprivileged amputees by giving them artificial prosthetic legs, as well as, wheelchairs and crutches.

He obtained his Master of Laws degree in 1971 from the University of Santo Tomas (UST) Graduate School (GS) and finished his Doctor of Civil Law degree in 1977 at the same university. As a benefactor of the UST-GS Alumni Association, he supported the association's projects and annual awarding ceremonies through his regular donations.

Bagatsing also served as the first president of the Negros Occidental High School (NOHS) Alumni Association, Inc. in the Bacolod.

== Legacy and love for horses ==
Bagatsing was well known for his love for horses. He successfully revived the Gran Copa de Manila and owned a huge Alabang ranch, where he raised many champion thoroughbreds. Since his death, the annual Mayor Ramon D. Bagatsing Memorial Cup has been held on his birth anniversary, becoming one of the biggest horse-racing festivals in the country, and whose receipts and earnings go to different charities. Asides from his passion for horses, Bagatsing also dabbled in cattle raising, as well as, enjoyed planting all kinds of fruit bearing trees in his other farms and agricultural properties.

A deeply religious man, Bagatsing, along with his wife, Annie, were supportive of the Catholic Church, especially in Manila's Sampaloc area, his home district. He was instrumental in the construction of many structures essential to the different Parishes and Church groups of the city. Moreover, Bagatsing is revered for founding a long-continuing annual Holy Week tradition in Sampaloc, which is the public Way of the Cross, popularly known as the "Karga Krus" procession every Good Friday. During this time, all devotees take turns bearing a life-size crucifix around the fifteen mysteries of the Rosary, situated in the streets and Barangays of the Parish district. Even in his later years, with advancing age and only one good leg, Bagatsing would religiously lead this special tradition, carrying the heavy Cross with the people beside him. For nearly half-a-century until the present, the "Karga Krus" tradition still continues with Bagatsing's descendants and the parishioners of Sampaloc.

Bagatsing maintained a very close friendship with the Archbishop of Manila, Cardinal Jaime Sin. When both were still alive, he would frequently seek the good Cardinal's advice on many public and, even, personal matters. The same rings true for the late Senator Gerardo Roxas, the only son of President Manuel A. Roxas, whom Bagatsing has shared a special bond with, as both were from Western Visayas as well as being active leaders of the Liberal Party, having entered Congress at the same time in 1957.

During the early 1970s, Bagatsing, a prime advocate of education for others, voluntarily set aside nearly ten hectares of his vast farm and village estate in Alabang for the expansion, to the south of Manila, of the Benedictine educational institution of San Beda, which is the present site of the San Beda College Alabang campus, located inside Alabang Hills Village, Muntinlupa.

When he was still alive, Bagatsing would always mark his birthday by conducting a two-day spiritual retreat in the company of the imprisoned accused at the Manila City Jail, often breaking bread with them in their cells and leading them to reflection and prayer at the prison chapel. He actually would spend the night in jail, talking and listening to the incarcerated, helping them with their problems before going to bed in a makeshift sleeping area near the prisoners. Of course, they were much to happy to be with Bagatsing, who would also give them plenty of food, clothing, supplies, and legal assistance for their pending cases. This was occasionally featured in various newspapers, usually with the tongue-in-cheek headline "Bagatsing in Jail", which never failed to put a smile on the face of Bagatsing and the fellow inmates.

Throughout his life, Bagatsing was fondly called "Bumbáy" (a colloquial, slightly derogatory Filipino term for the Indians, derived from Bombay), by his friends and constituents because of his Indian ancestry and strong facial features including his large Indian nose, and was a leading figure in the relationship between the Philippines and India.

A biography of Bagatsing, written by National Artist Nick Joaquin, was published posthumously in 2026 under the title Bombay: A True-Blue Filipino. Joaquin conducted interviews and worked on the manuscript between 1995 and 1997, but it remained unpublished following his death in 2004. After nearly three decades, the Bagatsing family decided to publish the manuscript in its original form without further revisions. The book was launched on August 19, 2026 at Manila City Hall, coinciding with Bagatsing's 110th birth anniversary.

On November 16, 2026, a copy of the biography was presented to Indian Prime Minister Narendra Modi during his visit to Manila for the 2026 ASEAN Summits. On social media, Modi described Bagatsing's life as a reminder of the longstanding cultural and historical connections between India and the Philippines.

== Personal life ==
Bagatsing married his first wife Corazon Cabigo Belmonte (June 1917 - before 1944) on September 13, 1939, in Manila. After his first wife's death, he married his second wife Juanita "Annie" Humbria Sevilla (May 4, 1918 in Carigara, Leyte - August 10, 1998) on August 19, 1944, in Manila.

His son Valentino S. Bagatsing is the country head of International Finance Company (IFC) in Nepal. Two other sons, Amado S. Bagatsing and Ramon "Don Don" S. Bagatsing, Jr., were former diplomat and congressmen representing the 5th District and 4th District of Manila, respectively. His eldest son also named Ramon "Boy" B. Bagatsing, Jr. is a former actor.

He is the grandfather of siblings Ramon "Raymond" S. Bagatsing, III, RK Bagatsing and Monina Bagatsing, children of Ramon "Boy" B. Bagatsing, Jr. and all in the entertainment industry; professional basketball player Hyram Bagatsing; 4th district city Councilor Don Juan "DJ" Bagatsing, son of Don Don Bagatsing, and former 5th District of Manila Representative Cristal Bagatsing, who served from 2016 to 2022 and the daughter of Amado Bagatsing.

== Death ==
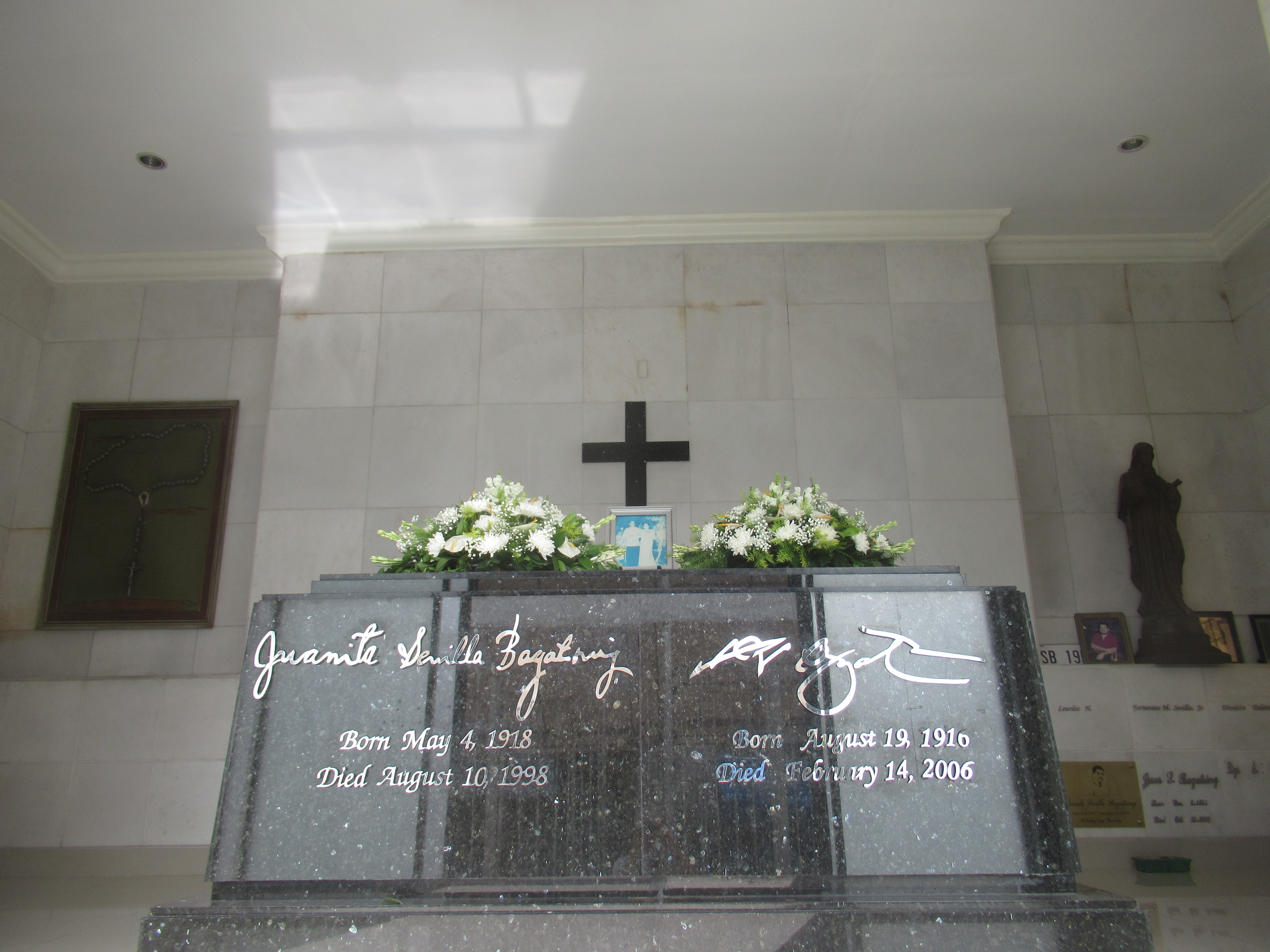
Tomb of Bagatsing and his second wife Juanita at the Manila South Cemetery

On the morning of February 14, 2006, Bagatsing died in his sleep due to cardiac arrest. He was buried beside his wife Juanita, who died almost eight years before him, in the family mausoleum at the Manila South Cemetery. Memorial services were held at the Manila City Hall and at the Our Lady of Loreto Church in the Sampaloc district, which he represented in Congress. Bagatsing is survived by his children Rica, Amado, Ramon Jr. ("Boy"), Rey, Roy, Ramon Jr. ("Don Don"), Jesus, Manuel, Eduardo, Raul, Marilyn, Lani and Valentino.

Even after his incumbency and death, Bagatsing continues to be held in high regard by the people of Manila as some of his children and grandchildren have been elected, in various times, as well as, at present, to Philippine Congress and the City Councils of Manila, Pasay, and Muntinlupa.

== Legacy ==
In commemoration of his career as mayor and a supporter of horse racing industry, the Bagatsing family organized the Mayor Ramon D. Bagatsing Racing Festival in 2009. The racing festival, usually held at the San Lazaro Leisure and Business Park in Carmona, Cavite, surpassed the total gross sales in racing in the 2014 edition (₱43 million). Famed horses Hagdang Bato and Low Profile were the winners for the past two editions of the Challenge of the Champions Cup in honor of Bagatsing himself.

In 2026, Ospital ng Sampaloc, a local government-run hospital in Sampaloc, Manila, was renamed to Mayor Ramon Bagatsing General Hospital in his honor.

== See also ==
- Mayor of Manila
- Plaza Miranda bombing
- City of Manila
- Manila City Hall
- National Defense College of the Philippines
- Fabrica
- Manila South Cemetery

== Notes ==
House of Representatives of the Philippines
Preceded by Arturo Tolentino	Representative, 3rd District of Manila; 1957–1965	Succeeded by Sergio Loyola
Preceded by Sergio Loyola	Representative, 3rd District of Manila; 1969–1972	Vacant District dissolved Title next held by Leonardo Fugoso
Political offices
Preceded by Antonio Villegas	Mayor of Manila; 1972–1986	Succeeded by Mel Lopez
Academic offices
Preceded by Consuelo Blanco	President of the University of the City of Manila; 1978–1982	Succeeded by Jose Villanueva
