= Don Juan Bagatsing =

Filipino politician from Manila

Don Juan "DJ" Bagatsing

Member of the Manila City Council from 4th district
- Incumbent
- Assumed office June 30, 2019
- In office June 30, 2010 – June 30, 2016

Personal details
- Born: Don Juan Alonso Bagatsing; July 27, 1977 (age 48) Santa Mesa, Manila, Philippines
- Citizenship: Filipino
- Party: Aksyon Demokratiko (2021–present)
- Other political affiliations: Asenso Manileño (2021–2024); PMP (2010–2021); KABAKA (2007–2021)
- Spouse: Hannah Ma. Fatima Bagatsing
- Parents: Ramon "Don Don" S. Bagatsing, Jr. (father); Angela Alonso (mother)
- Occupation: Politician

Don Juan "DJ" Alonso Bagatsing (born July 27, 1977) is a Filipino politician from Manila currently serving as city councilor of Manila for 4th district since 2019.

== Political career ==
Bagatsing served as city councilor of Manila for 4th district from 2010 to 2016. In 2016, he ran as congressman for 4th district, but lost to Edward Maceda.

In 2019, he ran as councilor under Joseph Estrada's slate, which DJ Bagatsing's uncle Amado was Estrada's running mate. Though the tandem were unable to win, he managed to win. He later coalesced with the ruling Asenso Manileño.

In 2022, he was re-elected under Asenso Manileño. He later joined the opposition in 2023 after the rift about budget hearings. He is a member of Aksyon Demokratiko since 2021, being named in the ticket led by Isko Moreno, who is seeking a mayoral comeback in 2025.

== Personal life ==
Bagatsing is son of former ambassador to India Ramon "Don Don" S. Bagatsing, Jr. and Angela Alonso. He is married to Hannah Ma. Fatima Bagatsing.

== Electoral performance ==
=== 2016 ===
2016 Philippine House of Representatives election in the 4th District of Manila
Party	Candidate	Votes	%
Asenso	Edward Maceda	46,349	41.53
KABAKA	Don Juan Bagatsing	23,807	21.28
Independent	Science Reyes	23,650	21.25
NUP	Rosemary "Annie" Leilani Bonoan	16,525	14.81
PDP–Laban	Jobe Sherwin Nkemakolam	1,263	1.13
Total votes		111,594	100.00
Asenso gain from NUP			
