= Ramon Bagatsing Jr. =

Filipino lawyer, politician, and diplomat

Ramon S. Bagatsing, Jr.
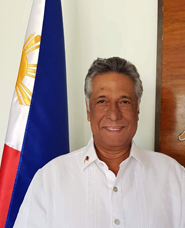
- Bagatsing in 2019

Ambassador of the Philippines to India
- In office June 25, 2019 – June 30, 2022
- President: Rodrigo Duterte
- Preceded by: Maria Teresita C. Daza
- Succeeded by: Josel Francisco Ignacio

Member of the House of Representatives from Manila's 4th district
- In office June 30, 1987 – June 30, 1998
- Preceded by: Vacant (post last held by Pablo V. Ocampo)
- Succeeded by: Rodolfo Bacani

Personal details
- Born: Ramon Sevilla Bagatsing Jr. January 25, 1950 (age 76) Manila, Philippines
- Party: Liberal (2006–present)
- Other political affiliations: LDP (1988–2006); LnB (1987–1988); Nacionalista (until 1987)
- Children: 2, including DJ
- Relatives: Amado Bagatsing (brother)
- Education: Saint Vincent College (BA); San Beda College (LL.B); University of Santo Tomas (LL.M)
- Occupation: Politician, diplomat
- Profession: Lawyer

Ramon Sevilla Bagatsing, Jr. (born January 25, 1950), also known as Don Don Bagatsing, is a Filipino lawyer, politician, and diplomat who was the Ambassador of the Philippines to India and Nepal from 2019 to 2022. He was previously a member of the House of Representatives of the Philippines from 1987 to 1998 representing the 4th District of Manila.

== Early life and education ==
Ramon "Don Don" S. Bagatsing, Jr. was born on January 25, 1950, the son of former Mayor of Manila Ramon D. Bagatsing, Sr. and his second wife Juanita Sevilla. His paternal grandfather was an Indian Sikh who immigrated to the Philippines in the early 1900s. Not to confused he has half-brother Ramon "Boy" B. Bagatsing, Jr. from his father first wife.

He attended San Beda College from kindergarten to high school. For his undergraduate studies, he went to Saint Vincent College in Latrobe, Pennsylvania, where he earned his bachelor of arts degree in political science. After that, he returned to San Beda College where he earned his law degree. He also went to University of Santo Tomas for his master's degree. He was admitted to the Philippine bar in 1976.

== Career ==
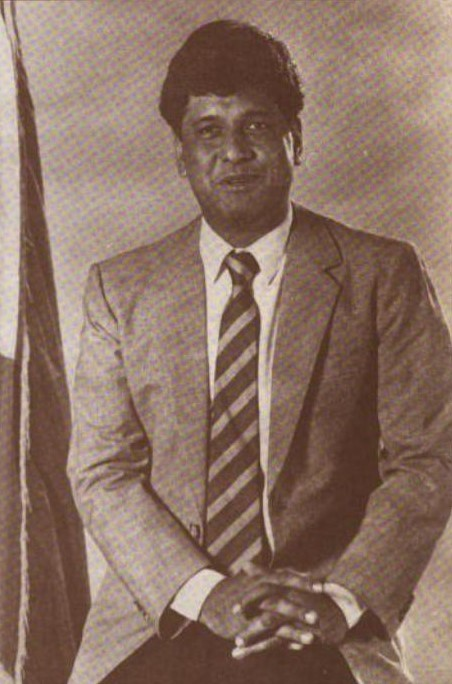
Official portrait during the 8th Congress

From 1978 to 1986, Bagatsing was chairman of the Manila Sports Development Council. Sometime in the early 1980s he was the executive chairman of the Manila KKK program committee which was a loan program of the City of Manila.

He was a member of the House of Representatives from 1987 to 1998 during the 8th, 9th, and 10th Congresses under the Lakas ng Bansa/UNIDO party. He was a assigned to the following committees during his term in the House:

- Committee on Youth and Sports Development
- Committee on Corporations and Franchises
- Committee on Education and Culture
- Committee on Economic Affairs
- Committee on Ways and Means
- Committee on Public Order and Security

In the 1998 general election, Bagatsing ran for the Senate under the Laban ng Demokratikong Pilipino and the Laban ng Makabayang Masang Pilipino, a coalition party founded by Joseph Estrada who was the coalition's candidate for president. He lost the election, gaining only 4,540,475 votes placing him 22nd in the race.

During the presidential term of Joseph Estrada, he served as deputy executive secretary for public affairs and chief of staff to then Executive Secretary Edgardo Angara. He took office in 2001, replacing Vicente dela Serna who previously resigned in December 2000. He covered both congressional and local government relations with the head of the Presidential Legislative Liaison Office reporting directly to him. He was also once the party spokesperson of Laban ng Demokratikong Pilipino.

In 2015, Bagatsing was appointed by President Benigno Aquino III to a four-year term as member of the Philippine Racing Commission representing horseowners.

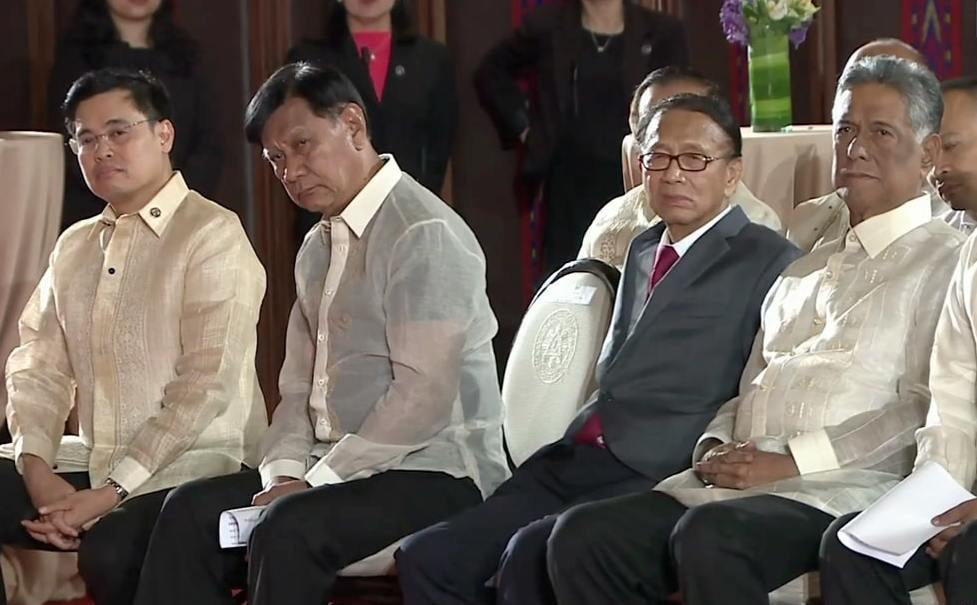
Bagatsing (rightmost) on February 7, 2019, during his oath-taking at Malacañang Palace

=== Ambassador to India ===
In January 2019, Bagatsing was nominated by President Rodrigo Duterte to be the Ambassador of the Philippines to India with concurrent jurisdiction over Nepal. His nomination was confirmed by the Commission on Appointments in February 2019. He arrived in India on June 1, 2019, and presented his credentials to President Ram Nath Kovind on June 25. He also presented his credentials to President of Nepal Bidya Devi Bhandari on September 11, 2019.

During the COVID-19 pandemic, Ambassador Bagatsing was instrumental in the repatriation of overseas Filipino workers stranded in the country. He also participated in talks to secure doses of the Indian-manufactured COVID-19 vaccines COVAXIN and Covovax to the Philippines.

== Personal life ==
Bagatsing is married to Angela Alonso. They are the parents of Don Juan (DJ) and Don Ramon Bagatsing, current and former councilors of Manila respectively.

He is an active sportsman. He previously served as a commissioner of the Philippine Amateur Cycling Association and of the Amateur Boxing Association of the Philippines. He is also a longtime horse owner and breeder who established the Mayor Ramon D. Bagatsing, Sr. Memorial Cup in 2009 along with his brother.
