= Atienza (surname) =

Atienza is a surname. Notable people with the surname include:

- Adolfo Atienza (1927–2008), Spanish footballer
- Ali Atienza (born 1972), Filipino politician, athlete and newscaster
- Ángel Atienza (1931–2015), Spanish artist and footballer
- Chi Atienza (born 1981), Filipino broadcast journalist, politician and 35th vice mayor of Manila
- Danilo Atienza (1951–1989), Filipino pilot in the Philippine Air Force
- David Atienza (born 1978), Swiss engineer
- Edward Atienza (1924–2014), British stage and film actor
- Eliana Atienza (born 2004), Filipino-Taiwanese UPenn student activist, daughter of Kim Atienza and sister of Emman Atienza
- Emman Atienza (2006–2025), Filipino-Taiwanese social media influencer and daughter of Kim Atienza
- Juan Beigbeder Atienza (1888–1957), Spanish Minister of Foreign Affairs during World War II
- Juan de Atienza (1546–????), Spanish missionary in South America
- Kim Atienza (born 1967), Filipino actor, TV host and former politician
- Kyla Atienza (born 1997), Filipino volleyball player
- Lito Atienza (born 1941), Filipino politician and former mayor of Manila
- Maile Atienza (born 1971), Filipino politician
- Pichu Atienza (born 1990), Spanish footballer
