= 2025 Manila local elections =

20th Mayoral elections in Manila

- May 12, 2025
- Mayoral election
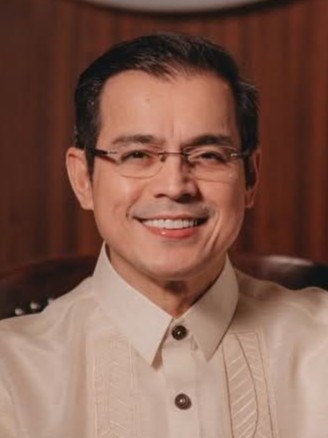

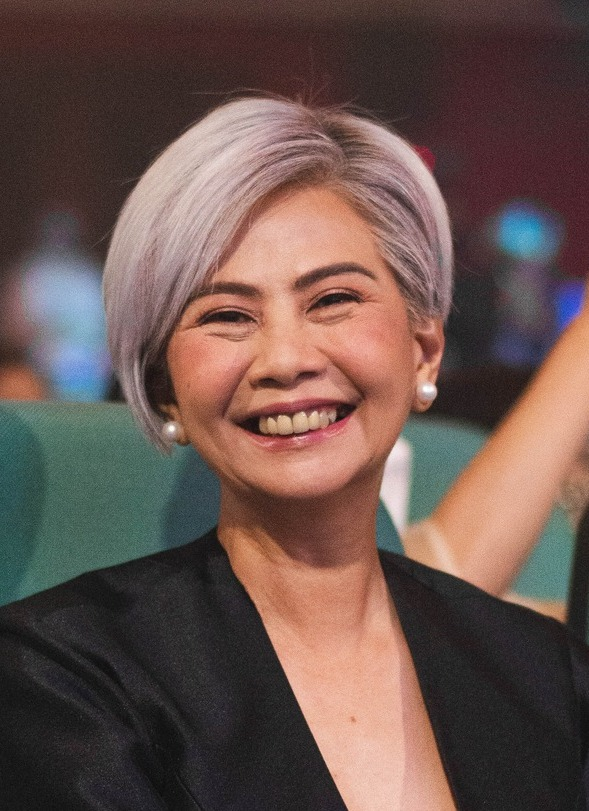

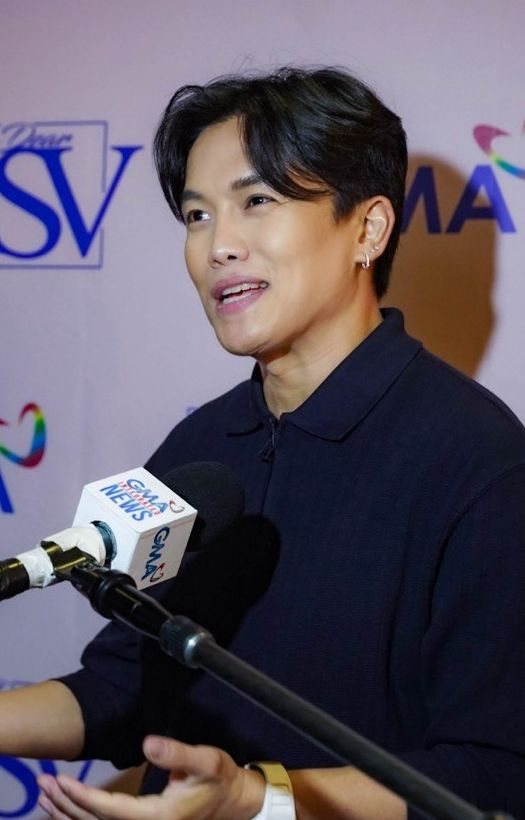
Candidate	Isko Moreno	Honey Lacuna	Sam Verzosa
Party	Aksyon	Asenso	Independent
Alliance	Yorme's Choice	Honey–Yul	Team SV Manila
Popular vote	530,825	190,617	164,434
Percentage	59.02%	21.19%	18.28%
Mayor before election
Honey Lacuna
Asenso
Elected mayor
Isko Moreno
Aksyon
- Vice mayoral election
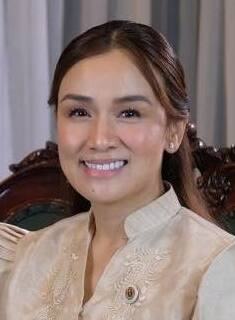

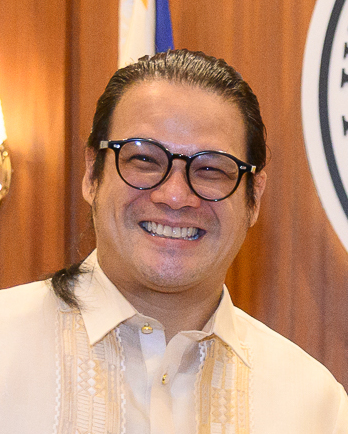

Candidate	Chi Atienza	Yul Servo
Party	Aksyon	Asenso
Alliance	Yorme's Choice	Honey–Yul
Popular vote	584,145	249,691
Percentage	66.65%	28.49%
Vice Mayor before election
Yul Servo
Asenso Manileño
Elected Vice Mayor
Chi Atienza
Aksyon
- City Council election

36 of 38 seats in the Manila City Council 20 seats needed for a majority
	First party	Second party	Third party
Party	Aksyon	Asenso	Independent
Alliance	Yorme's Choice	Honey-Yul	Independent
Last election	Did not participate (Note: All city councilor candidates who ran under Asenso Manileño in the 2022 Manila local elections were also listed as affiliated with Aksyon Demokratiko on the list of candidates, reflecting Asenso Manileño's national affiliation with Aksyon Demokratiko during that time.)	34 seats, 68.56%	2 seats, 8.43%
Seats before	16 seats	20 seats	0 seats
Seats won	23	12	1
Seat change	▲7	▼8	▲1
Popular vote	2,241,698	1,547,285	491,066
Percentage	50.09%	34.57%	10.97%

Local elections were held in Manila on May 12, 2025, as part of the 2025 Philippine general election. The electorate would elect a mayor, a vice mayor, 36 members of the Manila City Council, and six district representatives to the House of Representatives of the Philippines. The officials elected in the election will assume their respective offices on June 30, 2025, for a three-year-long term.

Isko Moreno and Chi Atienza were elected mayor on his non-consecutive second term and vice mayor on her first term respectively, defeating incumbents Honey Lacuna and Yul Servo.

== Background ==
In the 2022 elections, Asenso Manileño attained a landslide victory, winning 34 of the 36 elective seats in the Manila City Council and all six Manila seats in the House of Representatives of the Philippines. Then-vice mayor Honey Lacuna and Representative Yul Servo were elected mayor and vice mayor, respectively.

The election is expected to be competitive after Isko Moreno, who served as mayor from 2019 to 2022, reportedly formed the Bagong Maynila party to contest the election with a full slate of candidates, despite a plea from the incumbent Mayor Lacuna (who was hran mate in the 2019 election and his endorsed candidate in the 2022 election) to "reconsider his plans". Moreno initially intended not to run for any position after losing in the 2022 presidential election.

In August 2024, members of the city council allied with Moreno filed an injunction against Vice Mayor Yul Servo, Majority Floor Leader Ernesto Isip Jr., Minority Floor Leader Philip Lacuna, and 19 other councilors for conducting a session on July 23, when the city government declared all work to be suspended in view of Typhoon Carina. The Moreno allies who filed the suit condemned the meeting as being "illegal and secret", noting that ₱83 million city council funds were transferred to the office of the mayor during the meeting. The accused belied the suit and said that the session was live streamed.

== Electoral system ==
Local elections in the Philippines are held in every second Monday of May, every three years starting in 1992. Single-seat positions (mayor, vice mayor and House representative) are elected via first-past-the-post-voting. The mayor and vice mayor are elected by the city at-large, while the House representative and city councilors are elected per district.

City council elections are done via plurality block voting; for the Manila City Council, the city is divided into six districts, with each district sending six councilors. There are two other ex officio seats, from the municipal presidents of the Liga ng mga Barangay and Sangguniang Kabataan; these will be determined later in the year at the barangay and Sangguniang Kabataan elections.

Voters in Manila shall also elect senators and party-list representatives on this day.

== Campaign ==
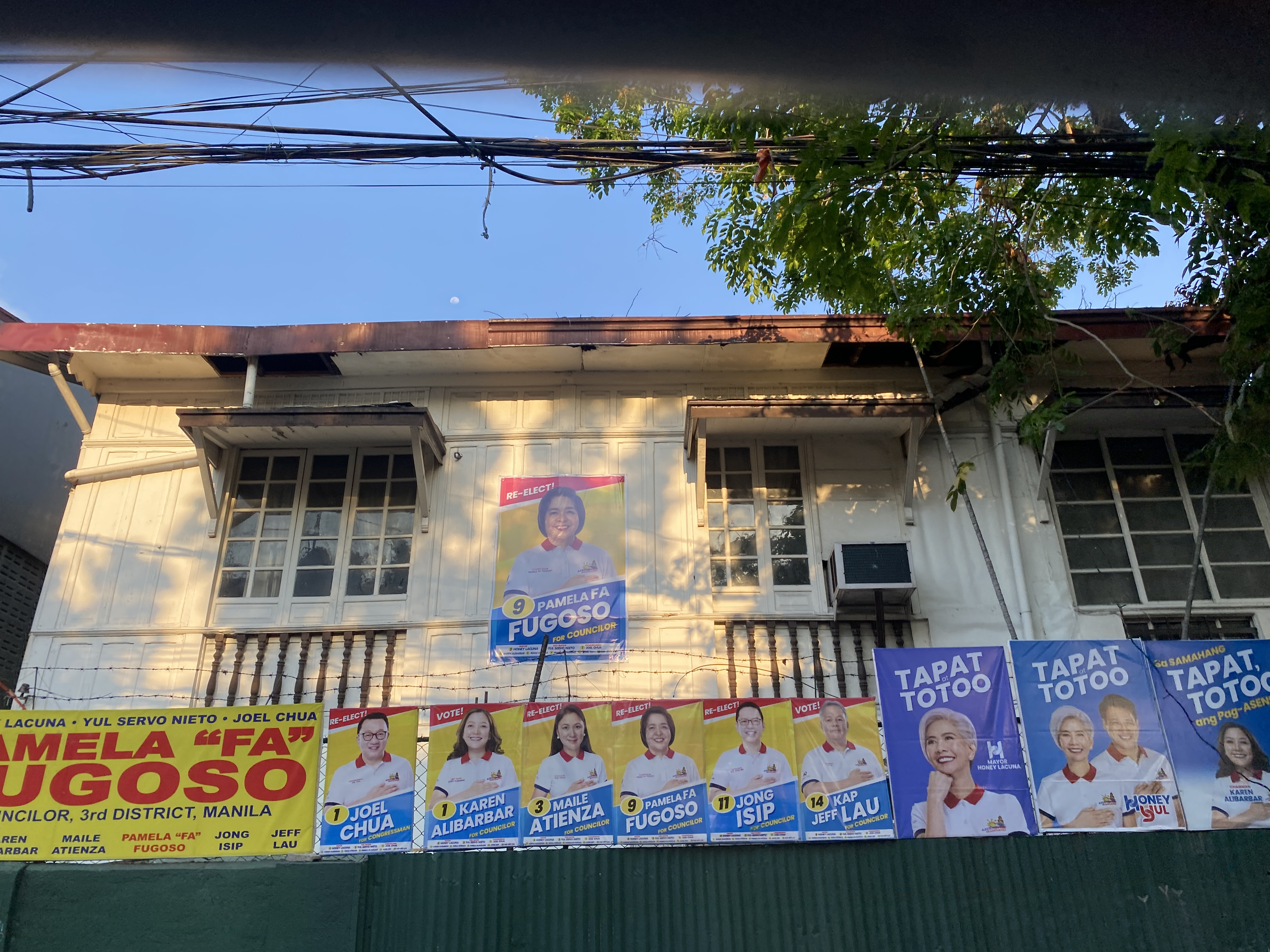
Asenso Manileño campaign posters in the 3rd district

The campaign period for local elections began on March 28, 2025, and ended on May 10.

=== Campaign issues ===
==== Garbage collection contract ====
Reports stated that City Government of Manila did not pay its waste management firm Leonel Waste Management Corporation (Leonel) for its first 4 months of service in 2024 of ₱500 million. Incumbent Mayor Honey Lacuna dismissed the allegation that her administration did not pay, and not a debt.

== Issues ==
=== Campaign conduct ===
In April 2025, third district councilor candidate Mocha Uson was criticized over her campaign jingle featuring the double-meaning lyric "Cookie ni Mocha, ang sarap-sarap" (transl. "Mocha's cookie, it's very delicious"), which was deemed sexually suggestive and objectifying. The COMELEC warned her, expressing concern that such content could detract from serious policy discussions and urged her to adopt a more appropriate campaign approach. She later asked her campaign team to drop the jingle.

=== Vote buying ===
On April 24, 2025, the Commission on Elections (COMELEC) Kontra Bigay committee issued show-cause orders to mayoral candidates Isko Moreno and Sam Verzosa over alleged vote buying activities surrounding their campaign. A day later, it also issued show-cause order against incumbent Mayor Honey Lacuna also for alleged vote buying, as well as alleged abuse of state resources, surrounding her re-election campaign.

== Endorsements ==
On March 28, 2025, during the Asenso Manileño proclamation rally in Sampaloc, Manila, singer and actress Angeline Quinto endorsed Honey Lacuna and voiced her concerns for Manileños. While, on April 5, 2025, Mamamayang Liberal (ML) also expressed its support for Lacuna's re-election.

On April 24, 2025, Isko Moreno and other candidates on his ticket were endorsed by Vice President Sara Duterte while campaigning in eastern Tondo, which is encompassed by the 2nd district.

== Tickets ==
=== Honey-Yul (Asenso Manileño/Lakas–CMD/ML) ===
Honey-Yul (Asenso Manileño/Lakas–CMD)
Position	#	Name	Party
Mayor	5.	Honey Lacuna	Asenso
Vice mayor	3.	Yul Servo	Asenso
Representative (1st district)	2.	Manny Lopez	Asenso
Representative (2nd district)	2.	Rolan Valeriano	NUP
Representative (3rd district)	1.	Joel Chua	Lakas
Representative (4th district)	3.	Giselle Lazaro-Maceda	Asenso
Representative (5th district)	2.	Irwin Tieng	Lakas
Representative (6th district)	1.	Benny Abante	NUP
Councilor (1st district)	4.	Niño Dela Cruz	Asenso
Councilor (1st district)	13.	Martin Isidro Jr.	Asenso
Councilor (1st district)	14.	MC Bobby Limyuen	Asenso
Councilor (1st district)	18.	Peter Ong	Asenso
Councilor (1st district)	20.	Marcelino Pedrozo	Asenso
Councilor (1st district)	24.	Eugenio Santiago Jr.	Asenso
Councilor (2nd district)	2.	Ruben Buenaventura	Asenso
Councilor (2nd district)	3.	David Chua	Asenso
Councilor (2nd district)	5.	Rodolfo Lacsamana	Asenso
Councilor (2nd district)	6.	Marc Christian Lacson	Asenso
Councilor (2nd district)	7.	Numero Lim	Asenso
Councilor (2nd district)	9.	Roma Paula Robles-Daluz	Asenso
Councilor (3rd district)	1.	Karen Alibarbar	Asenso
Councilor (3rd district)	3.	Arlene Maile Atienza	Asenso
Councilor (3rd district)	9.	Pamela Fuguso-Pascual	Asenso
Councilor (3rd district)	11.	Ernesto Isip Jr.	Asenso
Councilor (3rd district)	14.	Jefferson Lau	Asenso
Councilor (4th district)	3.	Roy Bacani	Asenso
Councilor (4th district)	6.	Freddie Bucad	Asenso
Councilor (4th district)	13.	Christian Floreindo	Asenso
Councilor (4th district)	19.	Bong Marzan	Asenso
Councilor (4th district)	20.	Dianne Nieto	Asenso
Councilor (4th district)	26.	Science Reyes	Asenso
Councilor (5th district)	13.	Belinda Isip	Asenso
Councilor (5th district)	22.	Charry Ortega	Asenso
Councilor (6th district)	1.	Benny Abante III	Asenso
Councilor (6th district)	5.	Salvador Philip Lacuna	Asenso
Councilor (6th district)	7.	Lito Linis	Asenso
Councilor (6th district)	10.	Francis Olaso	Asenso
Councilor (6th district)	13.	Martin I. Romualdez	Asenso

=== Yorme's Choice (Aksyon Demokratiko (Note: Even though Isko Moreno and some members of this ticket received endorsement from Vice President Sara Duterte and the DuterTen, there is no signed agreement between Aksyon and DuterTen that makes Aksyon as their official coalition partner or member.)) ===
Yorme's Choice (Aksyon Demokratiko)
Position	#	Name	Party
Mayor	2.	Isko Moreno	Aksyon
Vice mayor	1.	Chi Atienza	Aksyon
Representative (1st district)	1.	Ernix Dionisio	Lakas
Representative (2nd district)	1.	Carlo Lopez	Nacionalista
Representative (3rd district)	3.	Apple Nieto-Rodriguez	Aksyon
Representative (4th district)	4.	Joel T. Villanueva	Aksyon
Representative (5th district)	1.	Amado Bagatsing	Aksyon
Representative (6th district)	2.	Joey Uy	Aksyon
Councilor (1st district)	2.	Irma Alfonso-Juson	Aksyon
Councilor (1st district)	6.	Joaquin Domagoso	Aksyon
Councilor (1st district)	7.	Jesus Fajardo Jr.	Aksyon
Councilor (1st district)	11.	Sigfred Hernane	Aksyon
Councilor (1st district)	12.	Rosalino Ibay Jr.	Aksyon
Councilor (1st district)	16.	Erick Ian Nieva	Aksyon
Councilor (2nd district)	1.	Robert Bautista-Ong	Aksyon
Councilor (2nd district)	4.	Nico Evangelista	Aksyon
Councilor (2nd district)	8.	Rommel Miranda	Aksyon
Councilor (2nd district)	10.	Darwin Sia	Aksyon
Councilor (2nd district)	11.	John Christopher Sy	Aksyon
Councilor (2nd district)	12.	Edward Tan	Aksyon
Councilor (3rd district)	2.	Paul Alvarez	Aksyon
Councilor (3rd district)	8.	Johnny Dela Cruz	Aksyon
Councilor (3rd district)	15.	Christopher Tagle	Aksyon
Councilor (3rd district)	17.	Mocha Uson	Aksyon
Councilor (3rd district)	18.	Timothy Oliver Zarcal	Aksyon
Councilor (4th district)	2.	Francis Almiron	Aksyon
Councilor (4th district)	4.	Don Juan Bagatsing	Aksyon
Councilor (4th district)	5.	Romeo Bagay	Aksyon
Councilor (4th district)	8.	Eunice Castro	Aksyon
Councilor (4th district)	23.	Louisa Quintos	Aksyon
Councilor (4th district)	31.	Rino Tolentino	Aksyon
Councilor (5th district)	1.	Che Borromeo	Aksyon
Councilor (5th district)	9.	Bobby Espiritu	Aksyon
Councilor (5th district)	10.	Jaybee Hizon	Aksyon
Councilor (5th district)	12.	Mark Anthony Ignacio	Aksyon
Councilor (5th district)	15.	Sebastien Lao	Aksyon
Councilor (5th district)	31.	Raymundo Yupangco	Aksyon
Councilor (6th district)	3.	Voltaire Castañeda	Aksyon
Councilor (6th district)	8.	Kid Marasigan	Aksyon
Councilor (6th district)	9.	Fernando Mercado	Aksyon
Councilor (6th district)	11	Elmer Par	Aksyon
Councilor (6th district)	15.	Christian Uy	Aksyon
Councilor (6th district)	17.	Lou Veloso	Aksyon

=== Team SV Manila Wide ===
Team SV Manila Wide
Position	#	Name	Party
Mayor	11.	Sam Verzosa	Independent
Vice mayor	2.	Niño Anthony Magno	Independent
Representative (3rd district)	2.	Ramon Morales	PDP
Representative (4th district)	2.	Luisito Chua	Independent
Councilor (1st district)	3.	Michael De Leon	Independent
Councilor (1st district)	5.	Alexander Dionisio	Independent
Councilor (1st district)	10.	Ian Halili	Independent
Councilor (1st district)	25.	Eduardo Solis	Independent
Councilor (1st district)	26.	Monte Tabios	Independent
Councilor (3rd district)	5.	Antonio Cua Lee	PDP
Councilor (4th district)	1.	Romulo Acio Jr.	Independent
Councilor (4th district)	11.	Carlo Dela Cruz	Independent
Councilor (4th district)	15.	Gerardo Gamez	PROMDI
Councilor (4th district)	25.	~~Wendell Ramos~~	Independent
Councilor (4th district)	28.	Philip Jerico Sy	Independent
Councilor (5th district)	3.	Rubee Ruth Cagasca	Independent
Councilor (5th district)	4.	Ariel Dakis	Independent
Councilor (5th district)	19.	Andrew Ocampo	Independent
Councilor (5th district)	25.	Sonia Tamondong	Independent
Councilor (6th district)	12.	Emilet Quirante	Independent
Councilor (6th district)	18.	Fernando Vergel	Independent

=== Team Joseph Lumbad ===
Team Joseph Lumbad (Filipino Rights Protection Advocates of Manila Movement)
Position	#	Name	Party
Representative (1st district)	3.	Joseph Lumbad	FRONTLINERS
Councilor (1st district)	1.	Adrian Alban	FRONTLINERS

=== Ilocano Defenders ===
Ilocano Defenders
Position	#	Name	Party
Mayor	8.	Michael Say	Ilocano Defenders
Vice mayor	7.	Solomon Say	Ilocano Defenders

=== Kilusang Bagong Lipunan ===
Kilusang Bagong Lipunan
Position	#	Name	Party
Mayor	9.	Mahra Tamondong	KBL
Vice mayor	5.	Remedios Oyales	KBL
Councilor (1st district)	15.	Sylvia Felisa Manansala	KBL
Councilor (4th district)	9.	Edwin Cayetano	KBL
Councilor (5th district)	11.	Harry Huecas	KBL
Councilor (5th district)	18.	Jesus Magno	KBL
Councilor (5th district)	27.	Strauss Tugnao	KBL

=== Makabayan ===
Makabayan
Position	#	Name	Party
Councilor (1st district)	9.	Eduardo Gado	Makabayan

=== Partido Federal ng Pilipinas ===
Partido Federal ng Pilipinas
Position	#	Name	Party
Mayor	1.	Raymond Bagatsing	Independent
Vice mayor	4.	Pablo Chikee Ocampo	PFP
Councilor (4th district)	17.	Andrew Lopez	PFP
Councilor (4th district)	22.	Eduardo Quintos	PFP
Councilor (4th district)	29.	Aldwin Tan	PFP
Councilor (5th district)	7.	Paulino Martin Ejercito	PFP
Councilor (5th district)	8.	Gloria Enriquez	PFP
Councilor (5th district)	20.	Marilou Ocsan	PFP
Councilor (5th district)	30.	Gladina Villar	PFP
Councilor (6th district)	2.	Romualdo Billanes	PFP
Councilor (6th district)	4.	Juan Rafael Crespo	PFP

=== Partido Maharlika ===
Partido Maharlika
Position	#	Name	Party
Councilor (1st district)	8.	Arturo Flora	PM
Councilor (4th district)	18.	Ricardo Mariño	PM

=== Independents ===
Independent
Position	#	Name	Party
Mayor	3.	Jerry Garcia	Independent
Mayor	4.	Alvin Karingal	Independent
Mayor	6.	Jopor Ocampo	Independent
Mayor	7.	Enrico Reyes	Independent
Mayor	10.	Ervin Tan	Independent
Vice mayor	6.	Arvin Reyes	Independent
Representative (1st district)	4.	Edwin Santos	Independent
Representative (4th district)	1.	Trisha Bonoan-David	Independent
Councilor (1st district)	17.	Paolo Crisanto Niguid	Independent
Councilor (1st district)	19.	~~Rosemarie Pamulaklakin~~	Independent
Councilor (1st district)	21.	Jacqueline Pineda	Independent
Councilor (1st district)	22.	Michael John Pornilos	Independent
Councilor (1st district)	23.	Ferdinand Sandoval	Independent
Councilor (3rd district)	4.	Henrick Shannon Cigres	Independent
Councilor (3rd district)	6.	Nomer David	Independent
Councilor (3rd district)	7.	Eleazar De Pereira	Independent
Councilor (3rd district)	10.	Albert Alvin A. Go	Independent
Councilor (3rd district)	12.	Jose Jamisola	Independent
Councilor (3rd district)	13.	Rodelito Jurilla	Independent
Councilor (4th district)
Councilor (4th district)	7.	Anton Capistrano	Independent
Councilor (4th district)	10.	Reymon Cortez	Independent
Councilor (4th district)	12.	Clark Ferrer	Independent
Councilor (4th district)	14.	Christopher Gabriel	Independent
Councilor (4th district)	16.	Mojtaba Habibi	Independent
Councilor (4th district)	21.	Mark Ryan Ponce	Independent
Councilor (4th district)	24.	Francisco Ramos	Independent
Councilor (4th district)	27.	Jerrick Rotap	Independent
Councilor (4th district)	30.	Napoleon Tenay	Independent
Councilor (5th district)	2.	Injim Bunayog	Independent
Councilor (5th district)	5.	Diana Dayao	Independent
Councilor (5th district)	6.	Vincent Dinglasa	Independent
Councilor (5th district)	14.	Jonalaine Kuizon	Independent
Councilor (5th district)	16.	Wenifredo Limit	Independent
Councilor (5th district)	17.	Juan Luarca	Independent
Councilor (5th district)	21.	Shaun Olarte	Independent
Councilor (5th district)	23.	Jose Poligratis	Independent
Councilor (5th district)	24.	Dorothy Remegio	Independent
Councilor (5th district)	26.	Felix Tobillo Jr.	Independent
Councilor (5th district)	28.	Roderick Valbuena	Independent
Councilor (5th district)	29.	John Cyruz Villanueva	Independent
Councilor (6th district)	6.	James Lagasca	Independent
Councilor (6th district)	14.	Edwin Salve	Independent
Councilor (6th district)	16.	Michael Valderama	Independent

== Mayoral election ==
The incumbent mayor is Honey Lacuna, who was elected in 2022 with 63.68% of the vote. Elected as a member of Asenso Manileño, Lacuna is seeking reelection to a second consecutive term as a member of Lakas–CMD, having joined the party on August 7, 2024.

Lacuna previously served as vice mayor from 2019 to 2022 under former Mayor Isko Moreno, who did not seek a second term to run for president of the Philippines. Moreno was unsuccessful in his bid and had stated since 2021 that he would retire from politics if he lost. However, in July 2024, media outlets reported that Moreno plans to seek a return to the mayoralty under a newly formed "Bagong Maynila" party, severing his ties to the Asenso Manileño party but remaining a member of Aksyon Demokratiko, continuing his role as its party president, stating that he was just answering the calls that he should return as mayor. Following the reports, Lacuna remained committed with her reelection bid and encouraged Moreno to reconsider his plans for the mayoralty, while maintaining respect for his eventual decision, emphasizing her "sibling love" for the former.

=== Declared ===
- Raymond Bagatsing (Independent), actor
- Isko Moreno (Aksyon), mayor of Manila (2019–2022, 2025–present)
- Jerry Garcia (Independent)
- Alvin Karingal (Independent)
- Honey Lacuna (Asenso), mayor of Manila (2022–2025)
- Jopor Ocampo (Independent)
- Enrico Reyes (Independent)
- Michael Say (Ilocano Defenders)
- Mahra Tamondong (KBL), candidate for councilor in 2022
- Ervin Tan (Independent)
- Sam Verzosa (Independent), Tutok To Win partylist representative (2022–2025)

=== Declined ===
- Imee Marcos (Nacionalista), incumbent senator of the Philippines (2019–present) (running for re-election)

=== Results ===
Candidate	Party	Votes	%
Isko Moreno Domagoso	Aksyon Demokratiko	530,825	59.02
Honey Lacuna (incumbent)	Asenso Manileño/Lakas–CMD	190,617	21.19
Sam Verzosa	Independent	164,434	18.28
Raymond Bagatsing	Independent	6,242	0.69
Michael Say	Ilocano Defenders	2,325	0.26
Mahra Tamondong	Kilusang Bagong Lipunan	1,853	0.21
Ervin Tan	Independent	822	0.09
Enrico Reyes	Independent	702	0.08
Jerry Garcia	Independent	597	0.07
Alvin Karingal	Independent	508	0.06
Jopoy Ocampo	Independent	428	0.05
Total		899,353	100.00
Aksyon gain from Asenso			

=== Opinion polling ===
Fieldwork Date(s)	Pollster	Sample Size	MoE	Domagoso Aksyon	Versoza Independent	Lacuna Asenso	Bagatsing Independent
Apr 25–26, 2025	Tangere	1,500	±2.48%	48%	8%	40%	—
Apr 20–23, 2025	OCTA Research	1,200	±3%	63%	16%	18%	1%
Mar 15–20, 2025	RPMD Foundation Inc.	5,000	±1%	45%	38%	15%	—
Mar 2–6, 2025	OCTA Research	1,200	±3%	67%	16%	15%	1%
Jan 8–15, 2025	HKPH-ARC	1,800	±2%	46%	15%	31%	—
Jan 2–7, 2025	PhilData Trends	1,200	±3%	72.1%	13.5%	12.3%	1.4%
Jan 2–7, 2025	OCTA Research	1,200	±3%	74%	15%	9%	—

Hypothetical polling

Honey Lacuna vs. Isko Moreno

Fieldwork Date(s)	Pollster	Sample Size	MoE	Moreno Aksyon	Lacuna Asenso Manileño
July 6–10, 2024	OCTA Research	1,200	±3%	86%	8%

== Vice mayoral election ==
The incumbent Vice mayor is Yul Servo, who was elected in 2022 with 73.67% of the vote. Servo is eligible for reelection to a second term.

On July 22, 2024, Moreno introduced Ali Atienza as his vice mayoral running mate, however, he would be replaced by his sister Chi.

=== Candidates ===
==== Declared ====
- Chi Atienza (Aksyon), TV host and daughter of former Manila Mayor Lito Atienza
- Niño Anthony Magno (Independent)
- Yul Servo (Asenso), vice mayor of Manila (2022–2025)
- Chikee Ocampo (PFP), member of the Manila City Council from the fifth district (1995–1998)
- Remedios Oyales (KBL)
- Arvin Reyes (Independent)
- Solomon Say (Ilocano Defenders)

==== Declined ====
- Ali Atienza (Lakas), former councilor of 5th district and son of former Manila Mayor Lito Atienza

=== Results ===
Candidate	Party	Votes	%
Chi Atienza	Aksyon Demokratiko	584,145	66.65
Yul Servo (incumbent)	Asenso Manileño	249,691	28.49
Niño Anthony Magno	Independent	16,479	1.88
Chikee Ocampo	Partido Federal ng Pilipinas	9,120	1.04
Arvin Reyes	Independent	7,921	0.90
Solomon Say	Ilocano Defenders	6,966	0.79
Remedios Oyales	Kilusang Bagong Lipunan	2,073	0.24
Total		876,395	100.00
Aksyon gain from Asenso			

=== Opinion polling ===
Fieldwork Date(s)	Pollster	Sample Size	MoE	Atienza Aksyon	Servo Asenso
Apr 25–26, 2025	Tangere	1,500	±2.48%	57%	39%
Apr 20–23, 2025	OCTA Research	1,200	±3%	60%	33%

== House of Representatives elections ==
=== First district ===
Incumbent Ernix Dionisio ran for re-election to a second term.

2025 Manila's 1st congressional district election
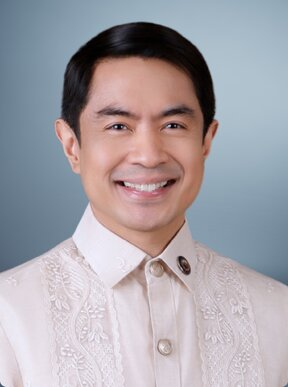
Candidate	Ernix Dionisio	Joseph Lumbad
Party	Lakas	FRONTLINERS
Alliance	Alliances: Aksyon (local); Yorme's Choice (local)
Popular vote	109,838	87,183
Percentage	51.15%	40.60%
Philippine Representative before election
Ernix Dionisio
Lakas
Elected Philippine Representative
Ernix Dionisio
Lakas

==== Candidates ====
- Ernix Dionisio (Lakas–CMD), incumbent representative from Manila's 1st district (2022–present)
- Manny Lopez (Asenso Manileño), former representative from Manila's 1st district (2016–2022), son of former Mayor Mel Lopez
- Joseph Lumbad (FRPAMM)
- Edwin Santos (Independent)

==== Results ====
Candidate	Party	Votes	%
Ernix Dionisio (incumbent)	Lakas–CMD/Aksyon	109,838	51.15
Joseph Lumbad	Filipino Rights Protection Advocates of Manila Movement	87,183	40.60
Manny Lopez	Asenso Manileño	16,334	7.61
Edwin Santos	Independent	1,385	0.64
Total		214,740	100.00
Lakas–CMD hold			

=== Second district ===
Incumbent Rolan Valeriano ran for re-election to a third term. His opponent is former Congressman Carlo Lopez. They have each won one of the last two contests: Lopez in 2010 and Valeriano in 2022.

2025 Manila's 2nd congressional district election
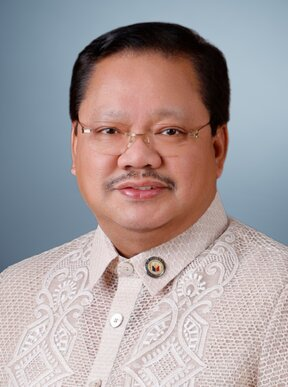

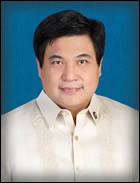
Candidate	Rolan Valeriano	Carlo Lopez
Party	NUP	Nacionalista
Alliance	Alliances: Bagong Pilipinas (national); Honey-Yul (local); Asenso (local)	Alliances: Aksyon (local); Yorme's Choice (local); DuterTen (national)
Popular vote	59,865	53,650
Percentage	52.74%	47.26%
Philippine Representative before election
Rolan Valeriano
NUP
Elected Philippine Representative
Rolan Valeriano
NUP

==== Candidates ====
- Carlo Lopez (Nacionalista), former representative from Manila's 2nd district (2010–2019)
- Rolan Valeriano (Asenso Manileño/NUP), incumbent representative from Manila's 2nd district (2019–present)

==== Results ====
Candidate	Party	Votes	%
Rolan Valeriano (incumbent)	National Unity Party/Asenso Manileño	59,865	52.74
Carlo Lopez	Nacionalista Party/Aksyon	53,650	47.26
Total		113,515	100.00
National Unity Party/Asenso Manileño hold			

=== Third district ===
Incumbent Joel Chua ran for re-election to a second term.

2025 Manila's 3rd congressional district election
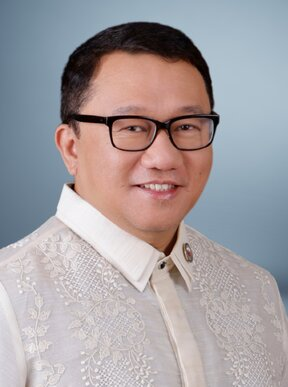

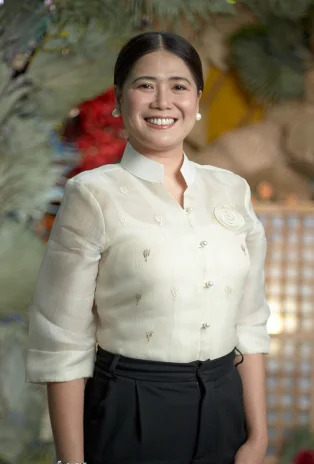
Candidate	Joel Chua	Apple Nieto
Party	Lakas	Aksyon
Alliance	Alliances: Bagong Pilipinas (national); Honey-Yul (local); Asenso Manileño (local)	Alliances: Yorme's Choice (local); DuterTen (national)
Popular vote	55,007	51,283
Percentage	47.83%	44.59%
Philippine Representative before election
Joel Chua
Lakas
Elected Philippine Representative
Joel Chua
Lakas

==== Candidates ====
- Joel Chua (Asenso Manileño/Lakas–CMD), representative from Manila's 3rd district (2022–present)
- Ramon Morales (PDP), councilor for the 3rd district (2006–2007, 2008–2013)
- Apple Nieto-Rodriguez (Aksyon), councilor for the 3rd district (2019–2025)

==== Results ====
Candidate	Party	Votes	%
Joel Chua (incumbent)	Lakas–CMD	55,007	47.83
Apple Nieto-Rodriguez	Aksyon Demokratiko	51,283	44.59
Ramon Morales	Partido Demokratiko Pilipino	8,725	7.59
Total		115,015	100.00
Lakas–CMD hold			

=== Fourth district ===
Incumbent Edward Maceda is term-limited. His party nominated his wife, Giselle Lazaro-Maceda.

2025 Manila's 4th congressional district election
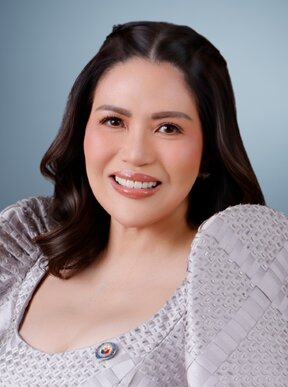

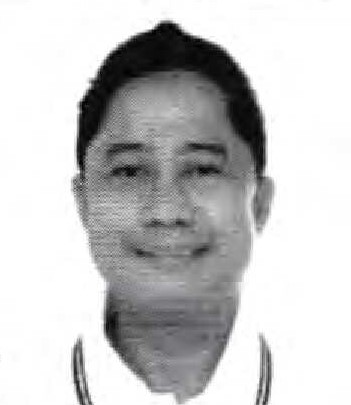
Candidate	Giselle Lazaro-Maceda	Joel "JTV" Villanueva
Party	Asenso	Aksyon
Alliance	Alliances: Bagong Pilipinas (national); Honey-Yul (local)	Alliances: Yorme's Choice (local); DuterTen (national)
Popular vote	54,446	35,651
Percentage	41.75	27.34
Philippine Representative before election
Edward Maceda
NPC
Elected Philippine Representative
Giselle Lazaro-Maceda
Asenso

==== Candidates ====
- Trisha Bonoan-David (Independent), representative from Manila's 4th district (2007–2016)
- Luisito Chua (Independent), councilor from the 4th district (2004–2013, 2016–2025)
- Giselle Lazaro-Maceda (Asenso Manileño), wife of incumbent representative Edward Maceda
- Joel T. Villanueva (Note: Not to be confused with the incumbent senator of the same name.) (Aksyon), councilor from the 4th district (2016–2025)

==== Results ====
Candidate	Party	Votes	%
Giselle Lazaro-Maceda	Asenso Manileño	54,446	41.75
Joel T. Villanueva	Aksyon Demokratiko	35,651	27.34
Louie Luisito Chua	Independent	32,937	25.26
Trisha Bonoan-David	Independent	7,371	5.65
Total		130,405	100.00
Asenso Manileño gain from Nationalist People's Coalition			

=== Fifth district ===
Incumbent Irwin Tieng ran for re-election to a second term.

2025 Manila's 5th congressional district election
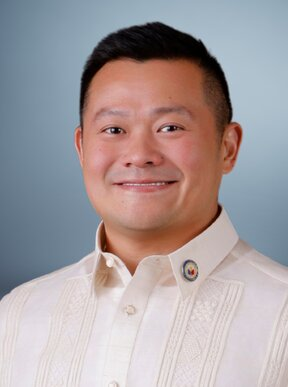

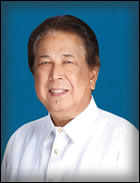
Candidate	Irwin Tieng	Amado Bagatsing
Party	Lakas	Aksyon
Alliance	Alliances: Bagong Pilipinas (national); Honey-Yul (local); Asenso (local)	Alliances: Aksyon (local); Yorme's Choice (local); KABAKA (local); DuterTen (national)
Popular vote	87,003	80,064
Percentage	52.08%	47.92%
Philippine Representative before election
Irwin Tieng
Lakas
Elected Philippine Representative
Irwin Tieng
Lakas

==== Candidates ====
- Amado Bagatsing (Aksyon/KABAKA), former representative from Manila's 5th district (1987–1998, 2007–2016)
- Irwin Tieng (Asenso Manileño/Lakas–CMD), incumbent representative from Manila's 5th district (2022–present)

==== Results ====
Candidate	Party	Votes	%
Irwin Tieng (incumbent)	Lakas–CMD	87,003	52.08
Amado Bagatsing	Aksyon Demokratiko	80,064	47.92
Total		167,067	100.00
Lakas–CMD hold			

=== Sixth district ===
Incumbent Benny Abante is eligible for re-election to a third consecutive term.

2025 Manila's 6th congressional district election
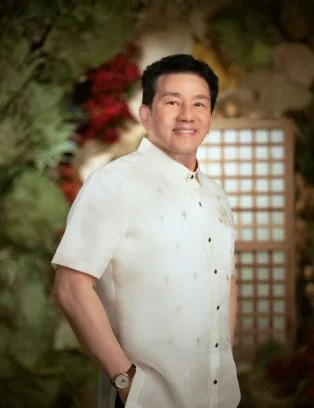

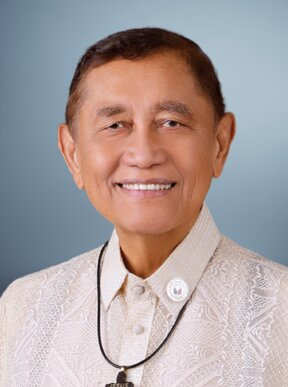
Candidate	Joey Uy	Benny Abante
Party	Aksyon	NUP
Alliance	Alliances: Yorme's Choice (local); DuterTen (national)	Alliances: Bagong Pilipinas (national); Honey-Yul (local); Asenso (local)
Popular vote	64,746	63,358
Percentage	50.54%	49.46%
Philippine Representative before election
Benny Abante
NUP
Elected Philippine Representative
Benny Abante
NUP

==== Candidates ====
- Benny Abante (Asenso Manileño/NUP), incumbent Representative from Manila's 6th district (2004–2010, 2019–present)
- Joey Uy (Aksyon), councilor for the 6th district (2004–2013, 2022–2025)

==== Results ====
On June 18, 2025, the Second Division of the Commission on Elections (COMELEC) annulled Joey Uy's election to the House of Representatives over questions surrounding his citizenship, effectively handing victory to his opponent, Benny Abante. On July 7, COMELEC, sitting en banc, upheld the June 30 decision to reject Uy's motion for reconsideration and ordered Abante's formal proclamation as the duly elected representative for Manila's 6th district. The following day, Abante was officially declared the winner and immediately assumed office, returning to the post he previously held until June 30.

Candidate	Party	Votes	%
Benny Abante (incumbent)	National Unity Party	63,358	100.00
Total		63,358	100.00
National Unity Party hold			

== City Council election ==
These are the parties participating in the election based on the initial list provided by COMELEC:

Party	Votes	%	Seats
Aksyon Demokratiko	2,241,698	50.09	23
Asenso Manileño	1,547,285	34.57	12
Partido Federal ng Pilipinas	58,355	1.30	0
Filipino Rights Protection Advocates of Manila Movement	53,089	1.19	0
Asenso Manileño/Partido Demokratiko Pilipino	32,921	0.74	0
Kilusang Bagong Lipunan	18,910	0.42	0
PROMDI	13,082	0.29	0
Partido Demokratiko Pilipino	9,007	0.20	0
Makabayan	6,577	0.15	0
Partido Maharlika	3,498	0.08	0
Independent	491,066	10.97	1
Ex officio seats			2
Total	4,475,488	100.00	38

=== First district ===
The city council district, coextensive with Manila's 1st congressional district, is composed of barangays in western Tondo (Barangays 1-146).

Councilors Irma Alfonso, Niño dela Cruz, Jesus Fajardo Jr., Martin V. Isidro Jr. and Erick Ian Nieva are eligible for reelection, while Councilor Moises Lim is term-limited.

==== Term-limited ====
- Moises T. Lim (Asenso Manileño)

==== Declared ====
- Joaquin Domagoso (Aksyon), actor and son of Isko Moreno

==== Withdrew ====
- Rosmar Tan (Independent), vlogger and entrepreneur

==== Declined ====
- Jayson Luzadas, vlogger and host of Pinoy Pawnstars

==== Results ====
Candidate	Party	Votes	%
Joaquin Domagoso	Aksyon Demokratiko	114,593	53.36
Jesus Fajardo Jr. (Incumbent)	Aksyon Demokratiko	108,710	50.62
Erick Ian Nieva (Incumbent)	Aksyon Demokratiko	105,063	48.93
Irma Alfonso (Incumbent)	Aksyon Demokratiko	88,902	41.40
Rosalino Ibay Jr.	Aksyon Demokratiko	85,561	39.84
MC Bobby Limyuen	Asenso Manileño	73,426	34.19
Niño Dela Cruz (Incumbent)	Asenso Manileño	70,699	32.92
Marjun Isidro (incumbent)	Asenso Manileño	69,328	32.28
Peter Ong	Asenso Manileño	63,276	29.47
Adrian Alban	Filipino Rights Protection Advocates of Manila Movement	53,089	24.72
Bobby Hernane	Aksyon Demokratiko	37,832	17.62
Eugene Santiago Jr.	Asenso Manileño	36,453	16.98
Alex Dionisio	Independent	33,704	15.70
Marcelino Pedrozo	Asenso Manileño/Partido Demokratiko Pilipino	32,921	15.33
Ferdie Sandoval	Independent	28,031	13.05
Jay Ching Pineda	Independent	19,109	8.90
Edgar Solis	Independent	18,970	8.83
Mike Asilo Pornilos	Independent	11,749	5.47
Mike Nash	Independent	6,816	3.17
Edong Gado	Makabayan	6,577	3.06
Ian Halili	Independent	5,621	2.62
Monte Tabios	Independent	4,976	2.32
Sylvia Felisa Manansala	Kilusang Bagong Lipunan	3,728	1.74
Paolo Crisanto Niguid	Independent	2,935	1.37
Rosmar Tan (withdrew)	Independent	2,883	1.34
Art Flora	Partido Maharlika	2,631	1.23
Total		1,087,583	100.00
Total votes		1,087,583	–

=== Second district ===
The city council district, coextensive with Manila's 2nd congressional district, is composed of barangays in eastern Tondo (Barangays 147-267).

Councilors Ruben Buenaventura, Rodolfo Lacsamana, Numero Lim, Roma Paula Robles-Daluz, and Darwin Sia are eligible for re-election. However, Sia's certificate of candidacy was cancelled by the 2nd Division of COMELEC due to a previous criminal conviction that perpetually disqualified him from public office. Councilor Macario Lacson is term-limited.

On May 20, 2025, the Supreme Court issued a temporary restraining order against Sia's disqualification, allowing him to be proclaimed. He was the topnotcher in the election upon getting 72,745 votes.

==== Term-limited ====
- Macario Lacson (Asenso Manileño)

==== Results ====
Candidate	Party	Votes	%
Darwin Sia (Incumbent) (Note: Disqualified by the 2nd Division of COMELEC on March 23, 2025; however, a temporary restraining order was issued by the Supreme Court on May 20, 2025 against the disqualification.)	Aksyon Demokratiko	72,745	64.08
Numero Lim (Incumbent)	Asenso Manileño	62,564	55.12
Ruben Buenaventura (Incumbent)	Asenso Manileño	60,500	53.30
Edward Tan	Aksyon Demokratiko	56,628	49.89
Rodolfo Lacsamana (Incumbent)	Asenso Manileño	53,645	47.26
John Christopher Sy	Aksyon Demokratiko	49,599	43.69
Roma Paula Robles (Incumbent)	Asenso Manileño	46,939	41.35
Robert Bautista-Ong	Aksyon Demokratiko	43,609	38.42
Marc Christian Lacson	Asenso Manileño	42,785	37.69
Nico Evangelista	Aksyon Demokratiko	40,950	36.07
David John Chua	Asenso Manileño	34,811	30.67
Rommel Miranda	Aksyon Demokratiko	32,518	28.65
Total		597,293	100.00
Total votes		597,293	–

=== Third district ===
The city council district, coextensive with Manila's 3rd congressional district, is composed of barangays in Binondo, Quiapo, San Nicolas and Santa Cruz (Barangays 268-394).

Councilors Maile Atienza, Pamela Fugoso, Ernesto Isip Jr., Apple Nieto-Rodriguez and Tol Zarcal are eligible for reelection, while Councilor Terrence Alibarbar is term-limited. However, Nieto-Rodriguez chose to retire from the council to run for district representative.

==== Term-limited ====
- Terrence Alibarbar (Asenso Manileño)

==== Declared ====
- Bong Alvarez (Aksyon), former basketball player
- Mocha Uson (Aksyon), former deputy administrator of the Overseas Workers Welfare Administration (2019–2022)

==== Results ====
Candidate	Party	Votes	%
Ernesto Isip Jr. (Incumbent)	Asenso Manileño	74,536	64.81
Pamela Fugoso (Incumbent)	Asenso Manileño	73,379	63.80
Maile Atienza (Incumbent)	Asenso Manileño	70,075	60.93
Timothy Oliver Zarcal (Incumbent)	Aksyon Demokratiko	67,747	58.90
Karen Alibarbar	Asenso Manileño	58,280	50.67
Jefferson Lau	Asenso Manileño	42,295	36.77
Johnny Dela Cruz	Aksyon Demokratiko	37,177	32.32
Christopher Tagle	Aksyon Demokratiko	32,989	28.68
Paul Alvarez	Aksyon Demokratiko	32,420	28.19
Mocha Uson	Aksyon Demokratiko	31,103	27.04
Jose Jamisola	Independent	23,538	20.47
Nelson Ty	Independent	11,041	9.60
Henrick Shan Cigres	Independent	10,788	9.38
Antonio Cua Lee	Partido Demokratiko Pilipino	9,007	7.83
Albert Alvin Go	Independent	8,449	7.35
Nomer David	Independent	3,919	3.41
Rodelito Jurilla	Independent	3,277	2.85
Eleazar De Pereira	Independent	2,994	2.60
Total		593,014	100.00
Total votes		593,014	–

=== Fourth district ===
The city council district, coextensive with Manila's 4th congressional district, is composed of barangays in Sampaloc (Barangays 395-586).

Councilors Don Juan Bagatsing, Louisa Quintos and Science Reyes are eligible for reelection, while Councilors Krystle Marie Bacani, Luisito Chua and Joel T. Villanueva are term-limited.

==== Term-limited ====
- Krystle Marie Bacani (Asenso Manileño)
- Luisito Chua (Asenso Manileño)
- Joel T. Villanueva (Aksyon)

==== Withdrew ====
- Wendell Ramos (Independent), actor

==== Results ====
Candidate	Party	Votes	%
Louisa Quintos (incumbent)	Aksyon Demokratiko	64,266	49.28
Don Juan Bagatsing (incumbent)	Aksyon Demokratiko	59,639	45.73
Science Reyes (incumbent)	Asenso Manileño	57,127	43.81
Francis Almiron	Aksyon Demokratiko	51,706	39.65
Mark Ryan Ponce	Independent	49,850	38.23
Eunice Castro	Aksyon Demokratiko	46,776	35.87
Anton Capistrano	Independent	46,655	35.78
Dianne Nieto	Asenso Manileño	43,840	33.62
Christian Floirendo	Asenso Manileño	37,330	28.63
Freddie Bucad Jr.	Asenso Manileño	32,350	24.81
Percival Bacani	Asenso Manileño	28,354	21.74
Eduardo Quintos	Partido Federal ng Pilipinas	23,395	17.94
Romeo Bagay	Aksyon Demokratiko	21,775	16.70
Ramon Marzan	Asenso Manileño	20,775	15.93
Gerino Tolentino Jr.	Aksyon Demokratiko	18,786	14.41
Gerardo Gamez	PROMDI	13,082	10.03
Jerrick Rotap	Independent	12,156	9.32
Romulo Acio Jr.	Independent	10,078	7.73
Carlo Dela Cruz	Independent	9,296	7.13
Edwin Cayetano	Kilusang Bagong Lipunan	5,579	4.28
Wendell Ramos (withdrew)	Independent	5,272	4.04
Francisco Ramos	Independent	4,771	3.66
Clark Ferrer	Independent	4,273	3.28
Andrew Lopez	Partido Federal ng Pilipinas	2,579	1.98
Reymon Cortez	Independent	1,907	1.46
Philip Jerico Sy	Independent	1,837	1.41
Aldwin Tan	Partido Federal ng Pilipinas	1,622	1.24
Christopher Gabriel	Independent	1,522	1.17
Mojtaba Habibi	Independent	1,192	0.91
Ricardo Mariño	Partido Maharlika	867	0.66
Napoleon Tenay	Independent	843	0.65
Total		679,500	100.00

=== Fifth district ===
The city council district, coextensive with Manila's 5th congressional district, is composed of barangays in Ermita, Intramuros, Malate, Port Area, San Andres, and southern Paco (Barangays 649-828).

Councilors Roberto Espiritu II, Jaybee Hizon, Charry Ortega and Raymundo Yupangco are eligible for reelection, while Councilors Laris Borromeo and Ricardo Isip Jr. are term-limited.

==== Term-limited ====
- Laris Borromeo (Aksyon)
- Ricardo Isip Jr. (Asenso Manileño)

==== Results ====
Candidate	Party	Votes	%
Rafael Borromeo	Aksyon Demokratiko	109,089	12.84
Jaybee Hizon (incumbent)	Aksyon Demokratiko	107,057	12.60
Bobby Espiritu II (incumbent)	Aksyon Demokratiko	104,611	12.31
Raymundo Yupangco (incumbent)	Aksyon Demokratiko	102,525	12.07
Charry Ortega (incumbent)	Asenso Manileño	81,725	9.62
Mark Anthony Ignacio	Aksyon Demokratiko	77,078	9.07
Bel Isip	Asenso Manileño	75,720	8.91
Zeb Laureano Lao	Aksyon Demokratiko	57,897	6.82
Felix Tobillo Jr.	Independent	19,351	2.28
Rubee Ruth Cagasca	Independent	17,621	2.07
Sonia Tamondong	Independent	16,514	1.94
Ariel Dakis	Independent	10,005	1.18
Andrew Ocampo	Independent	9,214	1.08
Paulino Ejercito	Partido Federal ng Pilipinas	8,515	1.00
Diana Dayao	Independent	7,788	0.92
Roderick Valbuena	Independent	5,821	0.69
Harry Huecas	Kilusang Bagong Lipunan	3,926	0.46
Juan Luarca	Independent	3,771	0.44
Gladina Villar	Partido Federal ng Pilipinas	3,528	0.42
Dorothy Remegio	Independent	3,425	0.40
Jett Magno	Kilusang Bagong Lipunan	3,237	0.38
John Cyruz Villanueva	Independent	3,178	0.37
Malou Ocsan	Partido Federal ng Pilipinas	2,578	0.30
Strauss Tugnao	Kilusang Bagong Lipunan	2,440	0.29
Jona Kuizon	Independent	2,285	0.27
Shaun Olarte	Independent	1,954	0.23
Gloria Enriquez	Partido Federal ng Pilipinas	1,930	0.23
Vincent Dinglasa	Independent	1,877	0.22
Injim Bunayog	Independent	1,863	0.22
Wenifredo Limit	Independent	1,502	0.18
Jun Poligratis	Independent	1,453	0.17
Total		849,478	100.00

=== Sixth district ===
The city council district, coextensive with Manila's 6th congressional district, is composed of barangays in northern Paco, Pandacan, San Miguel, Santa Ana, and Santa Mesa (Barangays 587-648 and 829-905).

Councilors Benny Fog Abante III, Salvador Philip Lacuna, Elmer Par, Luis Uy, and Lou Veloso are eligible for reelection, while Councilor Carlos Castañeda is term-limited. However, Uy chose to retire from the council to run for district representative.

==== Term-limited ====
- Carlos Castañeda (Aksyon)

==== Declared ====
- Lou Veloso (Aksyon)

==== Results ====
Candidate	Party	Votes	%
Lou Veloso (incumbent)	Aksyon Demokratiko	72,502	10.84
Joel Elmer Par (incumbent)	Aksyon Demokratiko	72,185	10.80
Christian Uy	Aksyon Demokratiko	71,181	10.65
Voltaire Castañeda	Aksyon Demokratiko	67,628	10.11
Benny Fog Abante III (incumbent)	Asenso Manileño	62,329	9.32
Fernando Mercado	Aksyon Demokratiko	61,912	9.26
Salvador Philip Lacuna (incumbent)	Asenso Manileño	55,548	8.31
Francis Olaso	Asenso Manileño	50,426	7.54
Martin Ignacio Romualdez	Asenso Manileño	42,203	6.31
Raul Marasigan	Aksyon Demokratiko	36,939	5.52
Paulito Linis	Asenso Manileño	26,567	3.97
James Lagasca	Independent	12,444	1.86
Raffy Jimenez Crespo	Partido Federal ng Pilipinas	9,692	1.45
Emilet Quirante	Independent	7,121	1.07
Michael Valderama	Independent	6,398	0.96
Fernando Vergel	Independent	6,227	0.93
Romualdo Billanes	Partido Federal ng Pilipinas	4,516	0.68
Edwin Salve	Independent	2,802	0.42
Total		668,620	100.00

== Aftermath ==
=== Legal action ===
COMELEC en banc ordered the suspension of the proclamation of Darwin Sia's victory pending resolution of the disqualification case filed against him. However, on May 20, 2025, the Supreme Court issued a temporary restraining order against his disqualification.

Although Uy won the congressional race in the sixth district, the COMELEC declared his candidacy void due to his citizenship and proclaimed Abante for his re-election. However, the decision was not final and executory retained Uy's proclamation. On July 7, COMELEC, sitting en banc, upheld the June 30 decision to reject Uy's motion for reconsideration and ordered Abante's formal proclamation as the duly elected representative for Manila's 6th district. The following day, Abante was officially declared the winner and immediately assumed office.
