= Alonzo de Barcena =

Spanish Jesuit missionary and linguist (c.1530-1597)

Venerable Alonso de Barzana SJ
- Born: ca. 1530; Belinchón, Cuenca, Spain
- Died: 31 December 1597; Cusco, Peru
- Venerated in: Roman Catholic Church

Alonzo de Bárcena (also called de Barzana) was a Spanish Jesuit missionary and linguist. A beatification process for him was opened in 2016.

== Biography ==
De Bárcena was a native of Baeza in Andalusia, southern Spain, born in 1528; he died at Cuzco, Peru on 15 January 1598. He became a Jesuit in 1565, and went to Paris in 1569.

He was first destined for the missions of Heartier, whence he was ordered (1577) to Juli, on the shores of Lake Titicaca in Southern Peru. He became one of the founders of this important mission.

Barcena remained in Central Bolivia for eleven years, when the Provincial Juan de Atienza sent him to Tucuman in Argentina. His work among the various tribes of that region and of Paraguay continued until 1593, when he was made Commissary of the Inquisition in those provinces. Exhausted physically by his long and arduous labors, Barcena died at Cuzco in Peru.

== Writings ==
De Bárcena is credited with having had a practical knowledge of eleven Indian languages and with having written grammars, vocabularies, catechisms in most of them. These manuscripts are possibly still in the archives of Lima, although they are now lost. Only one of his writings is known to have been published: a letter giving ethnographic and linguistic details on the Indians of Tucuman, on the Calchaquis and others. The letter (published in 1885) is dated 8 September 1594, at Asunción in Paraguay, and is addressed to the Provincial John Sebastian.

He made an extensive record of the Cacan language, but as the manuscript is lost and the language is unclassified at present.

== Beatification ==
In March 2016, the Roman Catholic Diocese of Cusco opened Alonzo de Barzana's beatification process. On December 18, 2017, he was declared by Pope Francis to be venerable on the account of his holy life.
