= Rendon Labador =

Filipino influencer (born 1991)

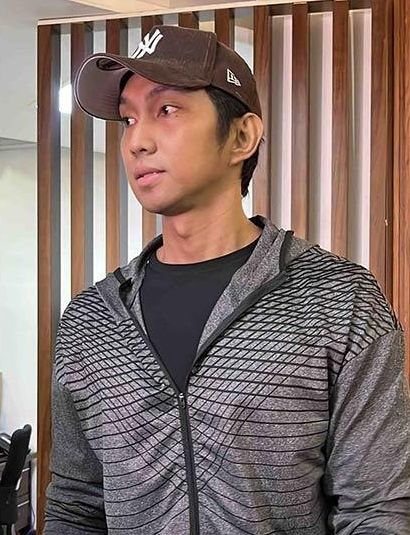
- Labador during his visit at Camp Crame in June 2025
- Born: July 24, 1991 (age 35)
- Education: University of the East
- Occupations: Vlogger; entrepreneur; fitness instructor; occasional actor
- Known for: Motivational content, fitness advice, and candid commentary on various social issues
- Rendon Labador's voice Labador during an interview with Manila mayor Isko Moreno, discussing social media issues and his aim to expose the truth behind controversies. Recorded 23 June 2023

Rendon Labador (born July 24, 1991), is a Filipino influencer and entrepreneur. Known for being highly spoken about public figures and sharing opinions on different issues in the Philippines media and online, he became viral after a meme he made, called "Motivational Rice". The Philippines Star listed Labador as one of the most controversial internet personalities in the Philippines.

In 2020, Labador rose to prominence social media, following his earlier work in fitness culture as a bodybuilder, which he began in 2014. He founded the gym Fitness Army in 2019, and also opened a restaurant called Episode Bar + Kitchen, which eventually closed following negative comments surrounding his online presence.

== Early life ==
Labador is eldest of six siblings. He was brought up by his aunt and grandparents. His father, Manolito Labador, is a retired general of the Philippine National Police and a fitness enthusiast. He graduated from the University of the East, where he began his studies in Information technology before transitioning to civil engineering, earning a dual degree in both fields. He has referred to himself as a "geek", with calculus being his preferred subject.

== Social media ==
Labador regularly discusses issues, including politics, social norms, and public figures.

=== 2021 ===
In July, Labador made headlines after an altercation with Filipino-Portuguese actor Kiko Matos during the Battle of the YouTubers event. A video of the incident went viral online, showing Labador initially thanking his supporters before being interrupted by Matos, who shouted "bobo ka!" ("transl. you're stupid") at him. Labador appeared to ignore the insult at first but then suddenly punched Matos in the head. The confrontation was quickly broken up by bouncers at the venue. Following the incident, both Labador and Matos uploaded videos on their respective YouTube channels expressing their intention to pursue legal action against each other.

=== 2022 ===
In September, Christiana Gabrielle Dimaunahan, a UAAP women's basketball player and daughter of basketball player and coach Aris Dimaunahan, also addressed Labador's comments. Dimaunahan, who was part of the National University Lady Bulldogs' historic winning streak, took to social media to confront Labador, calling out his perceived arrogance and dismissiveness toward the contributions of national athletes.

In October, Labador issued a public apology to Gilas Pilipinas head coach Chot Reyes after previously criticizing him during the team's struggles in the 2023 FIBA World Cup. In his statement, Labador recognized Reyes's sacrifices and courage, following the national team's eventual win.

In December, Rendon Labador criticized members of the Choco Mucho Flying Titans after a video of them allegedly ignoring fans in Boracay went viral on TikTok. Sharing the clip on Facebook, Labador questioned the team's manners, writing: "Sino po ang coach nitong mga ito? Dagdagan pa natin ng konti pang training sa good manners and right conduct." (transl. Who is the coach of these players? Let's add a bit more training in good manners and right conduct.) Television presenter Kim Atienza also commented, urging athletes to show gratitude to fans or maintain privacy if they prefer not to engage.

External videos
- A screenshot from Labador's video criticizing Choco Mucho Flying Titans players for allegedly snubbing fans during a public appearance in Boracay, which drew mixed reactions online.
- Sino ba sila?🤦‍♂️

Actress Nadine Lustre reacted to a controversial comment made by Labador on social media. A screenshot of Labador's remark circulated online, where he appeared to question Lustre's demeanor and image. He also referred to himself as a motivational speaker while allegedly making statements interpreted by some users as confrontational or aggressive. Lustre responded in a quote-retweet on Twitter (now known as X)

=== 2023 ===
In June, Labador faced backlash over his comments about actress Andrea Brillantes. Labador criticized Brillantes's behavior and appearance, which many viewed as misogynistic. His comments referenced her breakup with basketball player Ricci Rivero.

In July, Labador criticized a segment from the ABS-CBN show It's Showtime, where Vice Ganda and Ion Perez licked icing off their fingers in front of children, calling it inappropriate. Labador's comments quickly escalated the situation, leading the Movie and Television Review and Classification Board (MTRCB) to summon the producers of the show and eventually suspend it for 12 days. Labador celebrated the suspension, while ABS-CBN planned to challenge the decision.

Labador made headlines by criticizing comedian Michael V. in a social media post. Labador claimed that Michael V and other celebrities were "outdated" and accused them of lacking influence compared to social media personalities like himself. Labador asserted that social media now holds more power in shaping public opinion than traditional media. This statement sparked controversy and debate regarding the role and influence of social media in the entertainment industry.

In August, Labador has been vocal in criticizing various television personalities. He targeted senator Tito Sotto and his wife Helen Gamboa for their on-air display of affection during the 44th anniversary of the noontime show E.A.T. (commonly known as Eat Bulaga! after reclaiming its original title), Labador deemed the act as indecent and inappropriate for national TV, calling on the MTRCB to take action. He criticized Sotto for setting a bad example and accused him of contributing to the moral decline of television content. Labador also reacted to an apology from E.A.T. management over a controversial joke made by comedian Joey de Leon, advising de Leon to change his ways despite the apology. Labador continues to push for an investigation by the MTRCB.

In September, Labador's Facebook page was deleted, which he attributed to the mass reporting of his pages to fans of Batang Quiapo starring Coco Martin and It's Showtime host Vice Ganda. In response, Labador posted a message on his other social media platforms, expressing his gratitude to his supporters and promising to release an official statement on his YouTube channel. A few weeks later, Labador's Facebook page was restored.

=== 2024 ===
Labador expressed disapproval of internet personality and entrepreneur Deo Balbuena, also known as Diwata, who filed a Certificate of Nomination and Acceptance (CONA) for the 2025 elections. Labador reacted to news about Balbuena's political plans, stating that running for office should not be taken lightly. He implying that Diwata may not be fully aware of the responsibilities associated with public service.

Vlogger and entrepreneur, Rosmar Tan-Pamulaklakin was publicly addressed by Labador regarding her decision to run for public office in the 2025 Philippine midterm elections. Through a social media post, Labador advised Tan to withdraw her candidacy for councilor of the 1st district of Manila, stating, "Hindi mo alam ang pinapasok mo, hindi internet ang pulitika. Mag-backout ka na lang para matahimik na ang Pilipinas." (transl. You don't know what you're getting into; politics is not the internet. Just back out so the Philippines can have peace.)

=== 2025 ===
In May, Labador called out content creator Euleen Castro, also known as "Pambansang Yobab", after she posted a negative food review of a coffee shop in Iloilo. He took to Facebook, saying that criticisms should not harm small businesses and that "no to body shaming" should not be used as a shield for bad behavior. In the same month, a vlogger named Yanna drew backlash after a viral video showed her making an obscene gesture during a road altercation, which resulted in a show cause order issued by the Land Transportation Office (LTO). Labador responded on Facebook, criticizing her behavior and reminding influencers of their responsibility to set a positive example, with his remarks gaining significant attention online. Labador criticized a now-deleted viral video by vlogger Ser Geybin that featured a child sliding down a chair, calling it inappropriate and exploitative. He emphasized that public apologies should not be considered enough when minors are involved, urging relevant government agencies to investigate the matter and hold content creators accountable.

On November, Labador publicly called out Pinoy Big Brother: Unlimited winner Slater Young amid ongoing controversy surrounding the celebrity engineer. Rendon criticized Young for his luxury condominium project in the upland area of Cebu City, questioning its environmental impact. On his Facebook page, Rendon wrote, "Let's ask Young what's good to do in Sierra Madre. Where is he [Young]? contact me, we have a project. You haven't replied to my message." Many netizens also voiced disapproval, suggesting that Young's project contributed to worsening flooding in Cebu during Typhoon Kalmaegi (Tino).

== Other ventures ==
=== Fitness Army and Episode Bar + Kitchen ===
Labador is the owner of Fitness Army, a fitness gym, and previously operated a restaurant called Episode Bar + Kitchen, which permanently closed in 2023, after the establishment drew online attention for its ₱100 "motivational rice", though it was later clarified that the price had been adjusted to ₱50.

=== PNP fitness program ===
On June 19, 2025, Labador was invited to assist in promoting physical fitness among police personnel, in line with the Philippine National Police (PNP) at Camp Crame, Quezon City. The program was conducted in response to PNP Chief Gen. Nicolas Torre III's renewed emphasis on ensuring that police officers remain physically fit. According to Police Community Affairs and Development Group (PCADG) Director Brig. Gen. Marvin Joe Saro, the initiative was not a formal partnership but a voluntary collaboration, with no financial arrangement involved.

Labador introduced a 93-day "motivated functional workout and nutrition program", which departed from the typical fitness routines often implemented in police training, such as Zumba and Tae Bo. Around 150 officers initially enrolled in the program, which Labador said was designed to promote physical conditioning and mental discipline among law enforcement personnel.

On June 24, Labador was quickly evicted from a police physical fitness activity. The event, part of a PNP initiative dubbed "Pulisteniks", aimed to encourage overweight officers to participate in fitness training. Though the official memo did not name him, it referenced the June 19 event organized by the PCADG, where Labador led a workout. Negative reactions on social media led senior police officials to clarify that he was not hired to lead the PNP's fitness program.

== Views ==
=== Behavior and life discipline ===
In online posts and interviews, Labador talks about what he sees as a culture of complacency and excuses, which he criticizes. According to Daily Tribune, in a 2023 interview on One News (The Big Story) with Gretchen Ho, Labador stated that he posts his opinions without prior research or analysis, explaining that mistakes can be corrected: "Pag nagkamali ka ngayon, pwede mo na baguhin." (transl. If you make a mistake today, you can still change it.) He criticized overanalyzing decisions, saying it often leads to failure or delay. Labador also remarked that he does not selectively target individuals in his criticisms, asserting, "Basta 'pag may nakita akong mali, iko-correct ko kahit sino." (transl. As long as I see something wrong, I'll correct it no matter who it is.)

He has also been involved in various controversies, including a physical altercation with actor Kiko Matos, a widely criticized response to a Facebook commenter, and motivational statements that some audiences have described as unclear or contradictory. He criticized content that "fights for likes", arguing instead that creators must first influence themselves before seeking to inspire others.

Many influencers [today] are just after fame and money even though they could hurt many and send a wrong message in the process. I realized that there are so many good ways we can be famous. We don't need to fake ourselves, do pranks or violent stuff to gain views.

— Rendon Labador, 2021

In a 2023 interview with SunStar, Following his declaration as persona non grata by the municipal council of Coron, Palawan, due to alleged "disorderly behavior" and actions described as "inimical to the morals of the community", he responded by emphasizing the importance of personal accountability. He stated that individuals should take responsibility for their mistakes and treat setbacks as opportunities for growth, adding that there were "lessons learned" from the incident.

=== Motivational Rice ===
Labador's growing presence on social media, especially his "Motivational Rice" campaign, drew a wide range of reactions from the public. While some saw it as a creative and humorous way to inspire discipline, others criticized it as attention-seeking and overpriced.

Australian-British doctor and YouTube content creator Doc Adam Smith praised Labador's efforts to raise awareness about health issues such as obesity and diabetes in the Philippines. In a video, Smith interpreted the "Motivational Rice" campaign as an unconventional but creative approach to promoting healthier lifestyle choices and personal accountability. Swedish-Filipino fashion influencer Bryanboy said he wasn't motivated by Labador's rice, claiming they eat rice from Gucci worth 20,000 euros.

== Controversies ==
=== Livestreaming of Makati police raid ===
In 2023, Labador was under investigation by the Philippine National Police (PNP) for livestreaming a police raid on an online lending company in Makati. The raid, conducted by the PNP Anti-Cybercrime Group (ACG) in collaboration with the Presidential Anti-Organized Crime Commission (PAOCC) and the Securities and Exchange Commission (SEC), targeted the company for allegedly harassing clients who failed to repay loans. Labador's livestream, which showed the faces of employees and included a caption suggesting their guilt, has been criticized by the families of the workers. PNP spokesperson Capt. Michelle Sabino expressed concern that his presence and actions during the raid might have violated police protocols.

=== Persona non grata declaration in Palawan ===
In June 2024, Rendon Labador along with Rosmar Tan and Marki Tan, was declared persona non grata in the entire province of Palawan due to their disrespectful behavior, negative publicity, incitement to conflict, and violations of Republic Act No. 10951 (the 'Property and Damage Penalty Adjustment Act'), Article 153 of the Revised Penal Code, and Republic Act No. 11313 (the 'Safe Spaces Act'). The incident stemmed from Labador and Rosmar Tan angrily confronting a government employee at the municipal hall of Coron, Palawan for allegedly defaming them online over a charity event that they held.

== Personal life ==
Labador is a fitness instructor and entrepreneur and is known for being a "motivational speaker". In October 2021, Labador's partner, fellow fitness instructor and model Hazel Joy Ortiz, gave birth to their son. His brother named Jormiel Labador is also a social media personality.

== Filmography ==
=== Film ===
Year	Title	Role
2011	San Lazaro	Opening title sequence animator
2013	Momzillas	Minor role
2013	Bromance: My Brother's Romance	Brando Double
2013	Bekikang: Ang Nanay Kong Beki	Minor role

=== Television ===
Year	Title	Role
2019	Sandugo	Joseph Romero
