= Emman =

Emman could be a unisex given name or a middle name. Notable people with the name include:

- Emman Abeleda (born 1989), Filipino former actor
- Emman Atienza (2006–2025), Filipino and Taiwanese social media personality
- Emman Monfort (born 1989), Filipino basketball coach
- Emman Nimedez (1999–2020), Filipino YouTuber
- James Emman Kwegyir Aggrey (1875–1927), intellectual
