= Persona non grata (Philippines) =

Individuals or groups declared unwelcome in a Philippine locality

Persona non grata (Latin, lit. 'unwelcome person'), in the context of Philippine governance parlance, refers to individuals or groups declared as unwelcome in a particular locality. This designation is merely symbolic and non-binding, and does not legally prohibit a person declared as persona non grata from being physically present on that locality.

== Definition ==
Persona non grata means an unwelcome person in Latin. In the context of diplomacy or international relations, a persona non grata declaration on a foreign citizen, usually a diplomat who otherwise has a privilege of immunity, is barred from entering the country which issued the declaration. In the context of local governance in the Philippines, local government units (LGUs, including municipalities, cities, and provinces) could declare a person persona non grata. One such reason for a move is in response to the particular person breaking local ordinances and laws.

The declaration would imply that a person is barred from entering the jurisdiction of a particular locality. However, according to a Department of the Interior and Local Government (DILG) legal opinion, persona non grata declarations are often made through resolutions by the local legislature rather than ordinances and is merely made to express a sentiment; which effectively meant that such declarations are non-binding. In the case of the municipal council of Anahawan, Southern Leyte, declaring then-newly installed Mayor Roberto Loquinte as persona non grata for their opinion of Loquinte being unfit for the position, the DILG said that the local legislature is within their right to issue the declaration but the same must be done "within the bounds of the law". It also said that it could not legally prevent Loquinte from assuming the position as Mayor and/or discharging his function, an act which the DILG finds reprehensible.

== Notable personae non gratae ==
The following are notable people or groups who were declared as persona non grata by local government units (LGUs) in the Philippines. This excludes foreigners who were only barred entry and/or deported by the Philippine national government but includes foreigners who were declared as persona non grata by LGUs.

=== Politicians and government officials ===
| Person/s | Issuing LGU | Date | Background | Ref. |
|---|---|---|---|---|
| Ambeth Ocampo | San Juan, Metro Manila | 2009 | The San Juan city government declared Ocampo, chairperson of the National Historical Institute (NHI; now National Historical Commission of the Philippines) as persona non grata after the NHI relocated the historical marker where the first shot of the Philippine–American War was made from the base of the San Juan River Bridge to Santa Mesa, Manila. | |
| Rodolfo Fariñas | Ilocos Norte | 2017 | The Ilocos Norte Provincial Board declared Rodolfo Fariñas, incumbent 1st district representative of Ilocos Norte in the House of Representatives of the Philippines, as persona non grata after Fariñas launched an inquiry on the Ilocos Norte tobacco excise tax funds controversy. Fariñas himself is a resident of Laoag, the province's capital. | |
| Nicolas Torre | Calbayog | 2018 | The Samar Provincial Board, in its resolution, stated that SPPO Provincial Director Senior Superintendent Nicholas Torre III was allegedly engaged in partisan political activity during the recent election period, and failed to curb criminality in Calbayog. | |
| Omar Mayo | Baguio | 2021 | The Baguio City Council declared Omar Mayo, the appointed project supervisor of the National Electrification Administration (NEA) to help resolve the BENECO leadership dispute as persona non grata on October 25, 2021, after he led a pre-dawn takeover of the BENECO headquarters with the help of armed personnel of the Philippine National Police on October 18. BENECO's leadership is disputed between NEA-appointed general manager Ana Maria Rafael and BENECO Board backed manager engineer Melchor Licoben. | |
| Marie Rafael | Benguet | 2021 | The province of Benguet declared Former PCOO Asec. Marie Rafael persona non grata after the armed forceful entry into the BENECO headquarters on Oct. 18, 2021. | |
| Walden Bello | Davao City | 2022 | The Davao City Council declared Former Akbayan Representative and vice presidential candidate Walden Bello persona non grata for his statements in the 2022 vice presidential debates of where he called Davao City a trading hub for illegal drugs, and called the city government corrupt. | |
| Huang Xilian (Note: Citizen of China and diplomat. Has not been declared as persona non grata by the Philippine national government as per the Vienna Convention.) | Kalayaan, Palawan | 2023 | The municipal council of Kalayaan of the province of Palawan declares Huang Xilian, the ambassador of the China to the Philippines as persona non grata in response to the August 2023 Second Thomas Shoal standoff to condemn the Chinese presence in the area. Kalayaan covers the disputed Spratly Islands. | |

=== Other individuals ===
| Person/s | Issuing LGU | Date | Background | Ref. |
|---|---|---|---|---|
| Claire Danes | Manila | 1998 | The Manila City Council declared American actress Claire Danes after the shooting for the film Brokedown Palace as persona non grata and her movies were prohibited after derogatory comments she made about Manila and Filipinos in an interview with Vogue and Premiere magazine. In response to the declaration, then-President Joseph Estrada remarked that Danes should not be allowed to enter the Philippines. Danes later apologized for those remarks, but they refused to lift the ban. | |
| Daniel Razon | Apalit, Pampanga | 2008 | Members Church of God International (MCGI) leader, Daniel Razon was declared as persona non grata by the Municipal Council of Apalit when Razon criticized the local government's decision to order and effect the closure of the buildings erected inside the compound of the Ang Dating Daan (ADD) Convention Center in his program Good Morning Kuya. Razon claimed the Apalit government was influenced by other religious organizations critical to the MCGI which the municipal council says is "untrue and baseless". | |
| Candy Pangilinan | Baguio | 2009 | At the Mother's Day event at SM Baguio, Pangilinan for a joke implying that the audience mistaken her as an Igorot with the punchline that she is a human being. Pangilinan has apologized after the show and said she misdelivered the line and intended to say "Igorot statue". The Baguio City Council passed a resolution declaring her as persona non grata. | |
| Ramon Bautista | Davao City | 2014 | The Davao City Council declared comedian Ramon Bautista as persona non grata for his remarks that there are many hipon in the city during a rave party which is part of the Kadayawan Festival. Hipon, which literally translates to shrimp, is a colloquial term for a person with an attractive body but an unappealing face. Bautista has apologized for his remarks. | |
| Leah Navarro | General Santos | 2019 | The city council of General Santos declared Leah Navarro a persona non grata after she indicated that the recent Mindanao earthquakes were a form of "retribution" in her reply to Former Supreme Court spokesperson Theodore Te's tweet, "What’s with all the earthquakes in Mindanao?" Navarro has deleted the tweet. | |
| Ai-Ai delas Alas; Darryl Yap | Quezon City | 2022 | The Quezon City Council declared the actress Ai-Ai delas Alas as persona non grata for "disrespecting city's official seal", this is due to the motion filed by the QC District IV Councilor Ivy Lagman accusing Ai-ai delas Alas and Darryl Yap of defacing the city's triangle seal in a two-minute and 21-second video uploaded on Yap's Vincentiments Facebook Page. A member of the city council said that this resolution is not aimed at barring Ai-Ai from the locality but only for expressing the official sentiment towards the artist. Ai-Ai delas Alas's camp condemned the resolution. | |
| Pura Luka Vega | Various (Note: Pura Luka Vega has been declared as persona non grata in various local government units namely: Provinces (6): Bohol, Bukidnon, Dinagat Islands, Laguna, Nueva Ecija, and Occidental Mindoro; Municipalities and cities (8): Cagayan de Oro, Cebu City, Floridablanca, Lucena, Malolos, Mandaue, Manila, General Santos, and Toboso) | 2023 | The drag artist was declared persona non grata by various local government units for their drag performance bar in a traditional Jesus Christ-inspired outfit singing to a rock rendition of Ama Namin (Lord's Prayer). Local-level officials condemned the act as disrespectful to the country's predominant Catholic faith. | |
| Rendon Labador; Rosmar Tan; Marki Tan (Team Malakas) | Palawan | 2024 | The local government of Palawan declared Rosmar Tan persona non grata, along with Rendon Labador and Marki Tan, due to their disrespectful behavior, negative publicity, incitement to conflict, and alleged violations of Republic Act No. 10951 (the 'Property and Damage Penalty Adjustment Act'), Article 153 of the Revised Penal Code, and Republic Act No. 11313 (the 'Safe Spaces Act'). | |
| Richard Heydarian | Various (Note: Richard Heydarian has been declared as persona non grata in various local government units namely: Cotabato City; El Salvador, Misamis Oriental; Iligan; Isabela, Basilan; Lantapan; Valencia, Bukidnon; Panabo) | 2025 | The political analyst was declared a persona non grata in several local government units in Mindanao, after he compared Mindanao to the Sub-Saharan Africa in Human Development Index scores, during his appearance on CNN regarding the arrest of Rodrigo Duterte. Iligan was the first local government unit to designate him as such, on March 14, 2025, with Isabela in Basilan following suit the following day. | |
| Yanna Moto Vlog | Zambales | 2025 | Declared persona non grata by Zambales LGU after a road rage incident while shooting a vlog. | |
| Crist Briand | Bauang, La Union | 2026 | Declared persona non grata by Bauang vice mayor after the vlogger posted a video "mockingly calling" Bauang the home of Boang (crazy). | |

=== Groups ===
| Group | Issuing LGU | Date | Background | Ref. |
|---|---|---|---|---|
| Communist Party of the Philippines; New People's Army; National Democratic Front | Various | — | The Department of the Interior and Local Government (DILG) says that around 1,546 local government units in the Philippines (64 provinces, 110 cities and 1,372 municipalities) has declared the communist rebel groups as persona non grata as of December 11, 2020. | |
| Panday Sining | Manila | 2019 | The Manila City Council declared the militant art group Panday Sining, the cultural unit of left-leaning organization Anakbayan, persona non grata for spray-painting on walls on United Nations Avenue and the Lagusnilad underpass with messages calling for the end of political repression. | |

== Usage by non-governmental entities ==
Aside from usage under the context of international diplomacy, persona non grata has been devised by non-governmental bodies in the Philippines. Such organization include the Philippine Olympic Committee (POC), a private entity. The POC in 2011 declared former Philippine Karatedo Federation (PKF) president Go Teng Kok as persona non grata for violating the Olympic body's constitution and by-laws by taking legal action to prevent the recognition of then-newly installed PKF Enrico Vasquez. In 2021, it did the same to Philippine Athletics Track and Field Association (PATAFA) Philip Juico for his "malicious" public statements against Ernest John Obiena related to his federation's dispute on Obiena's accountability for the coaching fees of his coach.
