= Joey Uy =

Filipino politician (born 1962)

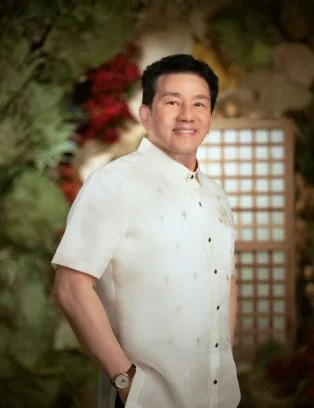
- Official portrait, 2022

Member of the Manila City Council from the 6th district
- In office June 30, 2022 – June 30, 2025
- In office June 30, 2004 – June 30, 2013

Personal details
- Born: Luis Chua Uy; March 15, 1962 (age 64) Santa Mesa, Manila, Philippines
- Party: Aksyon (2021–present)
- Other political affiliations: Asenso Manileño (2021–2024); Liberal (2007–2009; 2012–2013); PMP (2009–2012)
- Spouse: Melinda Lim
- Occupation: Politician

Luis "Joey" Chua Uy (born March 15, 1962) is a Filipino politician who has served as a member of the Manila City Council for the sixth district from 2022 to 2025 and previously from 2004 to 2013. In the 2025 election, he defeated incumbent representative Benny Abante in the congressional race in Manila's sixth district. The Commission on Elections later annulled his victory five weeks after the election, citing citizenship issues.

== Early life and career ==
Uy was born on March 15, 1962 in Santa Mesa, Manila. He entered politics in 2004, when he was elected to the Manila City Council as a member for the sixth district, a seat he held until 2013, being re-elected in 2007 and in 2010. He left the post in 2013 upon reaching the term limit. He would return to the local legislature in 2022 as part of a wider landslide victory of the Asenso Manileño, capped by the election of Honey Lacuna as mayor.

In August 2024, Uy became one of the 16 members of the Asenso bloc in the 12th City Council to leave the party after 19 councilors convened on July 23 when the city government declared all work to be suspended in response to the impact of Typhoon Carina. Having allied with former Mayor Isko Moreno following his exit, Uy was sworn in as a member of Aksyon Demokratiko on September 9. The Moreno-aligned councilors later filed a lawsuit over the incident, condemning the session as "illegal and secret", and accused that ₱83 million city council funds were transferred to the Office of the Mayor during the meeting, a claim that the plaintiffs would refute and claimed transparency with the session having been live-streamed. In September 2024, during tensions over proceedings on the city budget, Uy shoved Councilor Fog Abante to shield his ally, Councilor Joel T. Villanueva.

== 2025 Philippine House of Representatives campaign ==
=== Election ===
While Uy was eligible for another term as councilor, he challenged incumbent Representative Benny Abante for the congressional seat, running under Moreno's Yorme's Choice ticket. He was endorsed by Vice President Sara Duterte against Abante, who is her critic, as well as the Iglesia ni Cristo. Duterte later appeared in a campaign rally in support of his campaign.

On May 12, 2025, Uy narrowly defeated Abante by a margin of three thousand votes. Jake Maderazo of the Philippine Daily Inquirer regarded his win among the several "shocking upsets" in the midterm election. On May 26, 2025, Uy was sworn in before Manila Regional Trial Court (RTC) Executive Judge Carolina Icasiano-Sison, 35 days ahead of his scheduled assumption of office.

=== Disqualification ===
In response to his loss, Abante filed a petition before the Commission on Elections (COMELEC) to void Uy's proclamation as the winning candidate. Abante's camp argued that his opponent was not a natural-born Filipino citizen under the 1935 Constitution active at the time of his birth, which determined that legitimate children of foreign nationals could not automatically acquire natural-born status. Uy refuted the petition's claims, arguing that his mother was a natural-born citizen and insisting that his history of civic participation supported his qualification for the position. Nevertheless, under the 1935 Constitution, his mother immediately lost her Filipino citizenship upon marrying Uy's Chinese father Uy Ho. Uy Ho later became a naturalized Filipino citizen when Joey was five years old, and Joey's mother only regained her Filipino citizenship after giving birth to him. However, the 1973 Constitution revised parts of the citizenship provisions, which removed the requirement for children of Filipino mothers and foreign fathers to formally elect Philippine citizenship upon reaching legal age. Yet since the 1987 Constitution came into force, persons born to Filipino mothers before January 17, 1973, have again been subject to this formal election requirement. The 1973 Constitution also allowed Filipino women who married foreign men to retain Philippine citizenship upon marriage, even if they had acquired their husbands' nationalities.

The COMELEC granted Abante the petition on June 19, annulling Uy's election and declaring him the winner. COMELEC Chairman George Garcia added that there could be probable cause to file a criminal case against Uy for misrepresentation and perjury by relation are criminal offenses under the Omnibus Election Code.

The commission gave Uy five days to challenge the ruling before their decision becomes final and executory, and Abante is formally declared as the representative-elect. The deadline passed on July 7, and their ruling became final and executory, annulling Uy's proclamation and seating Abante as the district's representative in the 20th Congress. Uy's camp subsequently condemned Abante's proclamation as unconstitutional and filed a petition before the Supreme Court contesting the decision.

== Electoral history ==
Electoral history of Joey Uy
Year	Office	Party	Votes received				Result
Year	Office	Party	Total	%	P.	Swing	Result
2004	Councilor (6th district)					—N/a	Won
2007	Councilor (6th district)	Liberal	47,926		1st	—N/a	Won
2010	Councilor (6th district)	PMP	46,274	48.83	5th	—N/a	Won
2022	Councilor (6th district)	Asenso	85,309	79.27	1st	—N/a	Won
2025	Representative (Manila–6th)	Aksyon	64,746	50.54	1st	—N/a	Won (annulled)
