= Rosmar Tan =

Filipino vlogger

Rosmar Tan-Pamulaklakin
- Born: Rosemarie Peñamora Tan; February 12, 1994 (age 32); Lucena, Philippines
- Other name: Rosmar Tan
- Education: Far Eastern University (BS)
- Occupations: Vlogger; Entrepreneur; CEO
- Spouse: Jerome Pamulaklakin

TikTok information
- Page: rosmartan
- Followers: 22.4 million

Rosemarie Peñamora Tan-Pamulaklakin (born February 12, 1994), also known as Rosmar, is a Filipino vlogger, entrepreneur, and CEO of the skincare brand Rosmar International. She has also ventured into other businesses, including a pet shop, a samgyupsal restaurant, a massage and parlor business, a thrift store, a fish store, travel agency, concert venue and real estate.

Pamulaklakin is mostly known through her TikTok page, where she has amassed over 22.4 million followers.

== Early life and education ==
Pamulaklakin graduated with a bachelor's degree in medical technology from Far Eastern University. At 19, while still attending university, she established her first business, Mysterious Madre Cacao.

== Business career ==
The idea for her skincare company started when she adopted a bulldog with a skin disease. The previous owner of the dog told Pamulaklakin to try using the madre de cacao plant for the dog’s skin condition. She asked her father to gather a lot of leaves from the plant with the intention of selling them online. She then thought of extracting the juice, putting it in a bottle, and selling it for P350. She sold a lot and eventually decided to sell a gallon of it for ₱1,000. Rosmar revealed that her capital for a gallon of her 'Mysterious Madre Cacao' was just 50 pesos. When her business boomed, she was able to earn ₱200,000 a day and put up other businesses.

Pamulaklakin went viral in 2021, when her parents gifted her and her husband ₱1,000,000 in cash during their wedding dance.

In 2023, Pamulaklakin gifted her sister Razzel Nae Tan ₱1,000,000 in cash during the money dance portion of the latter's wedding.

In April 2024, Pamulaklakin announced the opening of her pares business, which she named "Rosemar Pares Overload."

Tan has 10 resorts and 30 torrens titles. She and her husband Jerome (Nathan Harisson) have seven luxury sports cars.

== Political career ==
Tan ran for councilor from the 4th district (Sampaloc) in the 2022 Manila local elections under PDP–Laban. However, she lost.

For the 2025 elections, Tan filed her candidacy to run for councilor, this time from the 1st district (western Tondo) as an independent.

== Controversy ==
In June 2024, Pamulaklakin, along with Rendon Labador and Marki Tan, was declared persona non-grata in the entire province of Palawan due to their disrespectful behavior, negative publicity, incitement to conflict, and violations of Republic Act No. 10951 (Property and Damage Penalty Adjustment Act), Article 153 of the Revised Penal Code, and Republic Act No. 11313 (Safe Spaces Act).

In 2025, the FDA released public Advisories that Tan's Skin Essentials’ “Premium Niacinamide Soap” and “Mysterious Madre de Cacao Soap” have no valid CPN.

== Personal life ==
Pamulaklakin is married with two daughters.

== Electoral history ==
Electoral history of Rosmar Tan
Election Year	Position	Party		Votes received				Result
Election Year	Position	National	Local	Total	%	Plc.	Swing	Result
2022	Councilor (Manila–4th)	PDP–Laban	UniTeam Manila	4,383	0.67%	20th	—N/a	Lost
2025	Councilor (Manila–1st)	Independent	—N/a	2,883	1.34%	25th	—N/a	Withdrawn

== Filmography ==
=== Television ===
Year	Title	Role	Network	Notes
2023	Zero Kilometers away	Yayo	GMA Network	
2023	Wish Ko Lang!	Rachel	GMA Network	

== See also ==
- Persona non grata (Philippines)
