= Persona non grata =

Unwelcome foreign person in a country

In diplomacy, a persona non grata (PNG; Latin for 'person not welcome', pl. personae non gratae 'people not welcome') is a foreign diplomat that is asked by the host country to be recalled to their home country. If the person is not recalled as requested, the host state may refuse to recognize the person concerned as a member of the diplomatic mission (including the removal of diplomatic immunity). A host country may declare any member of a diplomatic staff persona non grata at any time without any explanation.

== Diplomacy ==
Under Article 9 of the Vienna Convention on Diplomatic Relations, a receiving state may "at any time and without having to explain its decision" declare any member of a diplomatic staff persona non grata. A person so declared is considered unacceptable and is usually recalled to their home nation. If not recalled, the receiving state "may refuse to recognize the person concerned as a member of the mission". A person can't be declared persona non grata before entering the country.

With the protection of mission staff from prosecution for violating civil and criminal laws, depending on rank, under Articles 41 and 42 of the Vienna Convention, they are bound to respect national laws and regulations. Breaches of these articles can lead to erring staff being declared persona non grata. The sanction is also used to expel diplomats suspected of espionage, described as "activities incompatible with diplomatic status", or criminal acts such as drug trafficking.

The declaration may also be a symbolic indication of displeasure. So-called "tit for tat" exchanges have occurred (whereby countries involved in a dispute each expel diplomats of the other country), notably during the Cold War. A notable occurrence outside of the Cold War was an exchange between the United States and Ecuador in 2011; the Ecuadorian government expelled the United States ambassador in response to the United States diplomatic cables leak, and the United States responded by expelling the Ecuadorian ambassador.

== Other usage ==
People other than diplomats can be declared persona non grata by a country.

In non-diplomatic usage, referring to someone as persona non grata is to say that the person is not popular or accepted by others.

In the Philippines, local legislatures of provinces, towns, and cities can declare certain people or groups, including non-diplomats and Filipino citizens, as persona non grata to express a negative sentiment toward the certain person through a non-binding resolution. This could be in response to the person breaking local ordinance or laws. This has also happened in Spain.

== See also ==
- Damnatio memoriae
- Exile
- Ostracism
- Outlaw
- Refugee
