= Kim Atienza =

Filipino TV host (born 1967)

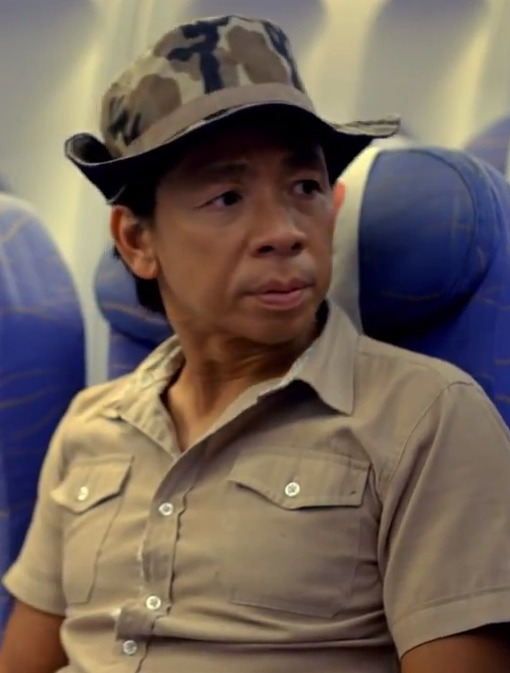
- Atienza as Tim in Shake, Rattle & Roll XV (2014)
- Born: Alejandro Ilagan Atienza; January 24, 1967 (age 59); Malate, Manila, Philippines
- Other name: Kuya Kim
- Education: University of the Philippines Diliman
- Occupation: Television presenter
- Political party: Liberal (1998–2004)
- Other political affiliations: PRP (1995–98)
- Spouse: Felicia Hung (m. 2002)
- Children: 3, including Emman
- Father: Lito Atienza
- Relatives: Ali Atienza (brother); Maile Atienza (sister); Chi Atienza (sister)

Member of the Manila City Council from the 5th district
- In office June 30, 1995 – June 30, 2004

YouTube information
- Channel: Atienza Vlogs
- Years active: 2020–present
- Genre: Vlogs
- Subscribers: 379 thousand
- Views: 16 million
- Last updated: October 29, 2025

Alejandro "Kim" Ilagan Atienza (Tagalog pronunciation: [ɐˈtʃɛnsa]; born January 24, 1967), also known by his nickname Kuya Kim (lit. 'Big Brother Kim'), is a Filipino television presenter and former politician. Prior to becoming the resident weather anchor for TV Patrol, Atienza served as councilor of Manila's 5th congressional district for three terms. He is known for his famous trivia stints on TV and radio, especially in his own show, Matanglawin. He is currently working at GMA Network as a segment presenter for 24 Oras and 24 Oras Weekend, and as the host of daytime variety game show TiktoClock and infotainment program Dami Mong Alam, Kuya Kim!

== Education ==
In 1984, Atienza entered the University of Santo Tomas, where he took up education as a freshman college student. A year later, he transferred to the University of Philippines Diliman, where he would earn his bachelor's degree in film and audiovisual communication. It was revealed that it took him seven years to finish college as he despised school. However, he clarified that he loved learning so he committed to finishing.

== Career ==
=== Political career (1995–2004) ===
Atienza was in politics for twelve years. From 1995 to 2004, he served as councilor of Manila from the 5th district for three terms. One of his notable resolutions that he filed to the city council is the resolution in 1998 declaring American actress Claire Danes as persona non grata and banning her films after Danes criticized the state of Manila's cleanliness. In 2004, he ran as representative of Manila's 5th congressional district but lost to incumbent Joey Hizon. His father, then Manila Mayor Lito Atienza, asked him to run for Mayor of Manila in 2007, but he declined and retired from politics, calling the field and profession as "scary".

=== Radio and television career (1987–present) ===
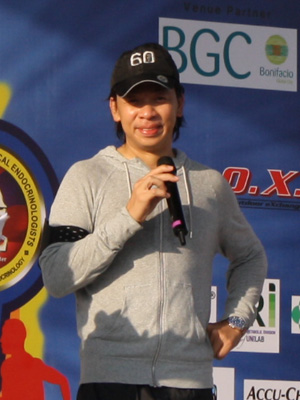
Kim Atienza at "The GOOD Run" event in Bonifacio Global City, Taguig, Metro Manila, Philippines in 2011.

He started his broadcasting career in the early 1990s, as the anchor of "Mata ng Agila" ("Eye of the Eagle"), an early morning newscast of DZEC Radyo Agila 1062, together with Onin Miranda.

Atienza started his stint on TV when he began hosting Magandang Umaga, Pilipinas' Animalandia, as well as voice acting in the 1990s. He is also best known for voicing Takeru (renamed as Michael Joe), portrayed by Japanese actor Ryousuke Kaizu from the Super Sentai series, Hikari Sentai Maskman, and he also references this in later years when he was being interviewed by fellow celebrity hosts. In 2023, during an interview with Boy Abunda on Fast Talk with Boy Abunda, he revealed that he voiced Steve Armstrong in the Filipino dub of the 1999 Voltes V film.

He worked as a protege for mainstay Ernie Baron, acting as ABS-CBN's weather tracker for TV Patrol until he became the show's weather presenter when the latter died of heart attack in 2006.

He left the early morning show, Umagang Kay Ganda in 2009 to host the late morning variety show (and now noontime variety show) It's Showtime (then named Showtime). He began hosting Matanglawin on March 24, 2008.

He returned to radio for the 2nd time in DZMM (later DWPM Radyo 630 before it reverted to its former name since 2025) via Sakto with Amy Perez-Castillo, replacing original host Marc Logan who left the show.

On September 29, 2021, Atienza announced his departure from ABS-CBN, effective October 1, revealing his move to GMA Network. He made his final appearance on TV Patrol as a segment weather presenter on the latter date, and he was succeeded by Ariel Rojas. He officially joined the competing newscast, 24 Oras, on October 4, introducing his eponymous segment, "#KuyaKimAnoNa," a week later on October 11. Additionally, he began hosting the talk show Mars Pa More on November 8 and a news magazine show titled Dapat Alam Mo! on GTV from October 18, 2021, to October 25, 2024. The latter show served as pre-programming for 24 Oras and had a provisional simulcast on GMA from February 14 to March 18, 2022. In July 2022, Atienza became one of the leading hosts for the noontime variety game show TiktoClock, along with Pokwang and Rabiya Mateo (now replaced by Herlene Budol).

== Personal life ==
=== Family ===
Atienza is married to Felicia Hung, and they have three children: Jose III, Eliana, and Emman. Felicia is the president and founding member of Chinese International School Manila (CISM). Kim Atienza is an avid marathoner, triathlete and cyclist. Politician Lito Atienza is Atienza's father, while politicians Ali Atienza, Maile Atienza, and Chi Atienza are his siblings.

Eliana Atienza attended the University of Pennsylvania; she was suspended in June 2024 for participating in the school's pro-Palestine campus encampment. Atienza's other daughter, Emman, a 19-year-old TikTok influencer and a Sparkle GMA Artist Center talent, died by suicide in October 2025. Previously, in 2023, Atienza had talked about making an effort to understand Emman's bipolar disorder diagnosis and provide her with professional help. He acknowledged that, as a member of Gen X, he initially failed to understand mental health, but knew it was "a matter of life and death" for his daughter because his 18-year-old niece, Andrea Atienza-Beltran, had died by suicide in 2015.

=== Health issues ===
Atienza had a stroke in 2010. In 2013, he was diagnosed with Guillain–Barré syndrome, a rare disease that attacks the nervous system. Atienza made a full recovery and has since finished several marathons, as well as Ironman 70.3 and full Ironman Triathlon races. He continues to compete and lead his age group to this day.

== Filmography ==
=== Film ===
- Saan Nagtatago Si Happiness (2006) – First film role appearance
- Astig (2009)
- Wapakman (2009)
- Here Comes the Bride (2010) – Cameo
- Shake, Rattle & Roll XV (2014) – "Flight 666" segment, first MMFF film role appearance
- Here Comes the Groom (2023) – Cameo
- Shake, Rattle & Roll Extreme (2023) – "Glitch" segment, Cameo
- GG: Good Game (2024) – Cameo

=== Television ===
- Muscles in Motion (1987)
- Sports Review (1991–1993)
- Daimos (1993) as Kazuya Ryuzaki (Richard Hartford) (Voice Dubber)
- Hikari Sentai Maskman (1989–1990) (1993–1998) (replayed in IBC-13) as Takeru (renamed as Michael Joe) (Voice Dubber)
- Ultraman Ace (1993) as Captain Mura (Voice Dubber)
- Magma Man (1993) as Misakey (Voice Dubber).
- Voltes V (1999) (GMA) as Kenichi Go (Steve Armstrong) (Voice Dubber)
- Magandang Umaga Pilipinas (2004–2007) – host
- Umagang Kay Ganda (2007–2009) – host
- Kapamilya, Deal or No Deal (2007) – Celebrity player (won the one-million-peso briefcase)
- TV Patrol (2006–2021) – weatherman/Weather-Weather Lang, Alamin kay Kuya Kim and Kaunting Kaalaman segment anchor
- Entertainment Live (2008–2012) – Co-Host
- Matanglawin (2008–2020) – Host
- It's Showtime (formerly called as Showtime) (2009–2016; 2019–2020) – Co-host
- Magpasikat (2010) – Co-host
- Barangay DOS! (2011) – Host
- 24 Oras (2021–present) – #KuyaKimAnoNa segment anchor
- 24 Oras Weekend (2023–present) – #KuyaKimAnoNa segment anchor
- Dapat Alam Mo! (2021–2024) – Main host
- Mars Pa More (2021–2022) – Main host
- TiktoClock (2022–present) – Lead host
- Zero Kilometers Away (2023)
- Dami Mong Alam, Kuya Kim! (2024–present) – Host

=== Radio ===
- Sakto (DZMM) (2018–2020)

== Awards ==
- 29th Star Awards for Television Best Education Program Host – for Matanglawin
- 28th Star Awards for Television Best Education Program Host – for Matanglawin
- 26th Star Awards for Television Best Education or Children's Program Host – for Matanglawin
- 25th Star Awards for Television Best Educational Program Host – for Matanglawin
- 24th Star Awards for Television Best Educational Program Host – for Matanglawin
- 22nd Star Awards for Television Best Educational Program Host – for Matanglawin
- 32nd Star Awards for Television Best Educational Program Host – for Matanglawin
- 26th Star Awards for Television Best Game or Reality Show Host – for It's Showtime
- 2015 KBP Golden Dove Awards for Best Children's Show – for Matanglawin
- 2008 KBP Golden Dove Awards for Best Children's Show – for Matanglawin
- 2007 KBP Golden Dove Awards for Best Children's Show – for Matanglawin
- 2015 Golden Screen Awards for Outstanding Natural History Wildlife Program Host and Show – for Matanglawin
- 2012 Golden Screen Awards for Outstanding Natural History Wildlife Program Host and Show – for Matanglawin
- 2011 Golden Screen Awards for Outstanding Natural History Wildlife Program Host and Show – for Matanglawin
