= Manila's 6th congressional district =

Congressional district of Manila

- Constituency for the House of Representatives of the Philippines
- Boundary of Manila's 6th congressional district in Manila
- Location of Manila within Metro Manila
- City: Manila
- Region: Metro Manila
- Population: 300,186 (2020)
- Electorate: 169,499 (2025)
- Major settlements: 5 city districts: north Paco; Pandacan; San Miguel; Santa Ana; Santa Mesa
- Area: 7.79 km^{2} (3.01 sq mi)

Current constituency
- Created: 1987
- Representative: Benny Abante
- Political party: NUP; Asenso Manileño
- Congressional bloc: Majority

Manila's 6th congressional district is one of the six congressional districts of the Philippines in the city of Manila. It has been represented in the House of Representatives of the Philippines since 1987. The district consists of barangays 587 to 648 and 829 to 905 in the eastern Manila districts of north Paco, Pandacan, San Miguel, Santa Ana and Santa Mesa bordering Makati, Mandaluyong, Quezon City, and San Juan also facing the Pasig River. It is currently represented in the 20th Congress by Benny Abante of the National Unity Party (NUP) and Asenso Manileño.

This district includes the Malacañang Palace, the official residence of the president of the Philippines.

== Representation history ==
#	Image	Member	Term of office		Congress	Party	Electoral history	Constituent LGUs
#	Image	Member	Start	End	Congress	Party	Electoral history	Constituent LGUs
=== Manila's 6th district for the House of Representatives of the Philippines ===
District created February 2, 1987.
1		Pablo V. Ocampo	June 30, 1987	June 30, 1992	8th	PDP–Laban	Elected in 1987.	1987–present north Paco, Pandacan, San Miguel, Santa Ana, Santa Mesa (Barangays 587–648, 829–905)
1		Pablo V. Ocampo	June 30, 1987	June 30, 1992	8th	NPC	Elected in 1987.	1987–present north Paco, Pandacan, San Miguel, Santa Ana, Santa Mesa (Barangays 587–648, 829–905)
2		Sandy Ocampo	June 30, 1992	June 30, 2001	9th	NPC	Elected in 1992.	1987–present north Paco, Pandacan, San Miguel, Santa Ana, Santa Mesa (Barangays 587–648, 829–905)
2		Sandy Ocampo	June 30, 1992	June 30, 2001	10th	NPC	Re-elected in 1995.	1987–present north Paco, Pandacan, San Miguel, Santa Ana, Santa Mesa (Barangays 587–648, 829–905)
2		Sandy Ocampo	June 30, 1992	June 30, 2001	11th	NPC	Re-elected in 1998.	1987–present north Paco, Pandacan, San Miguel, Santa Ana, Santa Mesa (Barangays 587–648, 829–905)
3		Mark Jimenez	June 30, 2001	March 6, 2003	12th	Independent	Elected in 2001. Election annulled by House electoral tribunal due to citizenship.	1987–present north Paco, Pandacan, San Miguel, Santa Ana, Santa Mesa (Barangays 587–648, 829–905)
–	vacant		March 6, 2003	June 30, 2004	12th	Vacant	No special election held to fill vacancy.	1987–present north Paco, Pandacan, San Miguel, Santa Ana, Santa Mesa (Barangays 587–648, 829–905)
4		Benny Abante	June 30, 2004	June 30, 2010	13th	Lakas	Elected in 2004.	1987–present north Paco, Pandacan, San Miguel, Santa Ana, Santa Mesa (Barangays 587–648, 829–905)
4		Benny Abante	June 30, 2004	June 30, 2010	14th	Lakas	Re-elected in 2007.	1987–present north Paco, Pandacan, San Miguel, Santa Ana, Santa Mesa (Barangays 587–648, 829–905)
(2)		Sandy Ocampo	June 30, 2010	June 30, 2019	15th	Liberal (KKK)	Elected in 2010.	1987–present north Paco, Pandacan, San Miguel, Santa Ana, Santa Mesa (Barangays 587–648, 829–905)
(2)		Sandy Ocampo	June 30, 2010	June 30, 2019	16th	Liberal (KKK)	Re-elected in 2013.	1987–present north Paco, Pandacan, San Miguel, Santa Ana, Santa Mesa (Barangays 587–648, 829–905)
(2)		Sandy Ocampo	June 30, 2010	June 30, 2019	17th	PDP–Laban (KKK)	Re-elected in 2016.	1987–present north Paco, Pandacan, San Miguel, Santa Ana, Santa Mesa (Barangays 587–648, 829–905)
(4)		Benny Abante	June 30, 2019	June 30, 2025	18th	NUP (Asenso Manileño)	Elected in 2019.	1987–present north Paco, Pandacan, San Miguel, Santa Ana, Santa Mesa (Barangays 587–648, 829–905)
(4)		Benny Abante	June 30, 2019	June 30, 2025	19th	NUP (Asenso Manileño)	Re-elected in 2022.	1987–present north Paco, Pandacan, San Miguel, Santa Ana, Santa Mesa (Barangays 587–648, 829–905)
5		Joey Uy	–	–	20th	Aksyon	Elected in 2025. Election annulled by the Commission on Elections due to citizenship.	1987–present north Paco, Pandacan, San Miguel, Santa Ana, Santa Mesa (Barangays 587–648, 829–905)
(4)		Benny Abante	July 8, 2025	Incumbent	20th	NUP (Asenso Manileño)	Declared winner of 2025 elections.	1987–present north Paco, Pandacan, San Miguel, Santa Ana, Santa Mesa (Barangays 587–648, 829–905)

== Election results ==
=== 2025 ===
2025 Philippine House of Representatives election in the 6th District of Manila
Party	Candidate	Votes	%
Aksyon	~~Joey Uy~~	~~64,796~~	~~50.54~~
NUP	Benny Abante	63,358	49.46
Total votes		169,499	100.00
NUP hold			

=== 2022 ===
2022 Philippine House of Representatives election in the 6th District of Manila
Party	Candidate	Votes	%
NUP	Benny Abante	95,431	79.37
PRP	Romualdo Billanes	22,221	18.48
Independent	Antonio Sityar II	2,582	2.15
Total votes		120,234	100.00
NUP hold			

=== 2019 ===
2019 Philippine House of Representatives elections
Party	Candidate	Votes	%
Asenso	Benny Abante	49,795	46.21
Bagumbayan	Patricia Yvette Ocampo	33,731	31.30
PMP	Cassy Sison	24,239	22.49
Total votes		107,765	100.00
Asenso gain from PDP–Laban			

=== 2016 ===
2016 Philippine House of Representatives elections
Party	Candidate	Votes	%
Liberal	Sandy Ocampo	56,844	53.41
Asenso	Benny Abante	48,260	45.35
Independent	Richard Bautista	695	0.65
Independent	Jose Castillo	623	0.59
Invalid or blank votes		6,774	
Total votes		113,196	
Liberal hold			

=== 2013 ===
2013 Philippine House of Representatives elections
Party	Candidate	Votes	%
Liberal	Sandy Ocampo	43,667	51.45
UNA	Benny Abante	40,571	47.80
Independent	Richard Bautista	407	0.48
Independent	Francisco Candaza	225	0.27
Total votes		84,870	100.00
Liberal hold			

=== 2010 ===
2010 Philippine House of Representatives elections
Party	Candidate	Votes	%
Liberal	Sandy Ocampo	39,985	38.63
Lakas–Kampi	Benny Abante	38,113	36.82
Nacionalista	Danilo Lacuna	24,866	24.03
Independent	Ramon Villanueva	204	0.20
Independent	Joven Yuson	160	0.16
PGRP	Marlo Gerardo Artacho	96	0.09
Bigkis	Ronaldo Tibig	76	0.07
Valid ballots		103,500	95.70
Invalid or blank votes		4,654	4.30
Total votes		108,154	100.00
Liberal gain from Lakas–Kampi			

=== 2007 ===
2007 Philippine House of Representatives elections
Party	Candidate	Votes	%
Lakas	Benny Abante	40,371	
Aksyon	Casimiro Sison	35,089	
UNO	Carlos Fernandez		
Independent	Prudencio Jalandoni		
PGRP	Arnold Baltazar		
Total votes			
Lakas hold			

=== 2004 ===
2004 Philippine House of Representatives election at Manila's 6th district
Party	Candidate	Votes	%
Lakas	Benny Abante	41,241	55.44
Liberal	Sandy Ocampo	33,146	44.56
KNP	Lou Veloso		
Independent	Julio Logarta Jr.		
Independent	Caridad Lao		
Independent	Romeo Nuñez		
Independent	Emmanuel Sunga		
Independent	Oswaldo Galla		
Total votes		74,387	100.00
Lakas gain from Independent			

== See also ==
- Legislative districts of Manila
