= Chi Atienza =

Vice Mayor of Manila since 2025

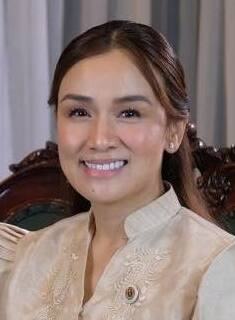
- Official portrait, 2025

36th Vice Mayor of Manila
- Incumbent
- Assumed office June 30, 2025
- Mayor: Isko Moreno
- Preceded by: Yul Servo

Personal details
- Born: Angela Lei Ilagan Atienza; July 26, 1981 (age 45) Manila, Philippines
- Party: Aksyon (2024–present)
- Spouse: Von Valdepeñas
- Children: 3
- Parent: Lito Atienza (father)
- Relatives: Kim Atienza (brother); Ali Atienza (brother); Maile Atienza (sister); Emman Atienza (niece)
- Education: De La Salle University (BA)
- Occupation: Politician; journalist; broadcaster
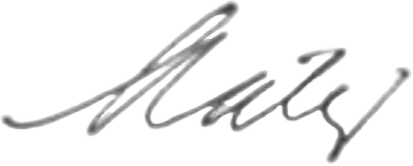
- Signature

Angela Lei "Chi" Ilagan Atienza–Valdepeñas (born July 26, 1981), also nicknamed as Chi-Chi, is a Filipino politician who has been the 35th vice mayor of Manila, the capital city of the Philippines, since 2025. A daughter of former mayor Lito Atienza, she is a graduate of De La Salle University. Before entering politics, she worked as a journalist and television host for PTV.

== Early life and education ==
Atienza was born on July 26, 1981, to Manila politician Lito Atienza, who was then a barangay captain, and Ma. Evelina Ilagan. She is the younger sister of broadcasters and former councilors Kim and Ali and incumbent councilor Maile. She is a graduate of political science at De La Salle University.

Atienza is known for being the director of Kababaihan ng Maynila (transl. The Women of Manila), an organization established by her father, former mayor Lito Atienza, to give livelihood for some women of the city.

== Broadcasting career ==
Atienza started appearing in advertisements shown on ABS-CBN in the early 2000s. She later entered Star Circle, the talent agency arm of the network, but later quit when she married. She has worked for PTV as one of the hosts of its morning program, Bagong Pilipinas. She was later assigned as one of the hosts of its replacement, Rise and Shine Pilipinas. She also worked for GMA, especially in the anthology show Maynila (when she substituted for her father in 2019).

== Vice mayor of Manila (from 2025) ==
=== Election ===
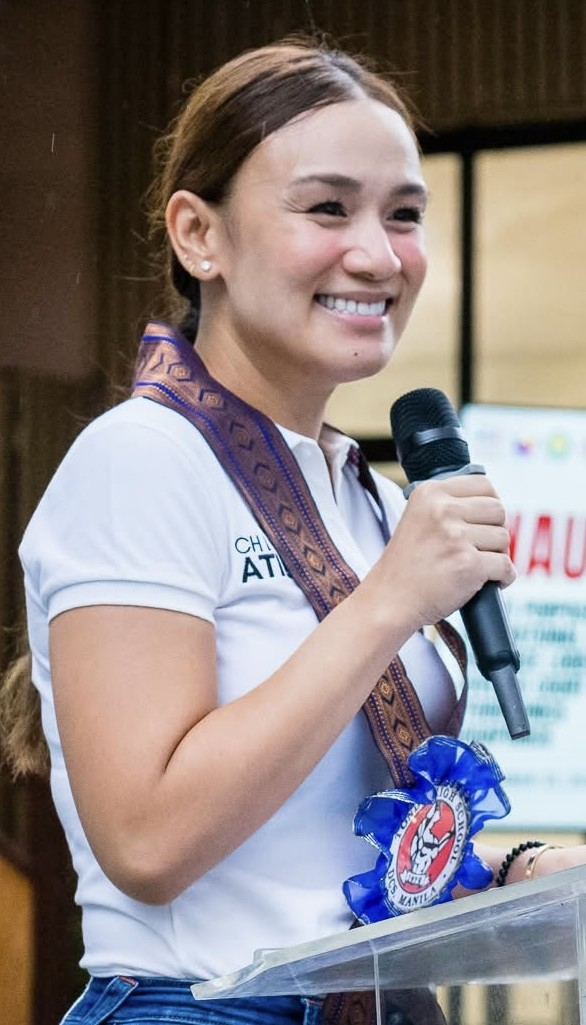
Atienza in 2024

Atienza originally planned to run for a seat in the Manila City Council from the fifth district under Mayor Honey Lacuna's Asenso Manileño ticket for the 2025 Manila local elections. However, she was later named by former mayor Isko Moreno to be his vice mayoral running mate for the election, replacing her brother Ali, who backed out before he could file his candidacy. She was also sworn in as one of the new members of Moreno's party, Aksyon Demokratiko.

Alongside Moreno, she won the election in a landslide victory, defeating incumbent Yul Servo. She became the third woman to hold the post, after Carmen Planas (who was appointed) and Honey Lacuna (the first to be elected).

=== Tenure ===
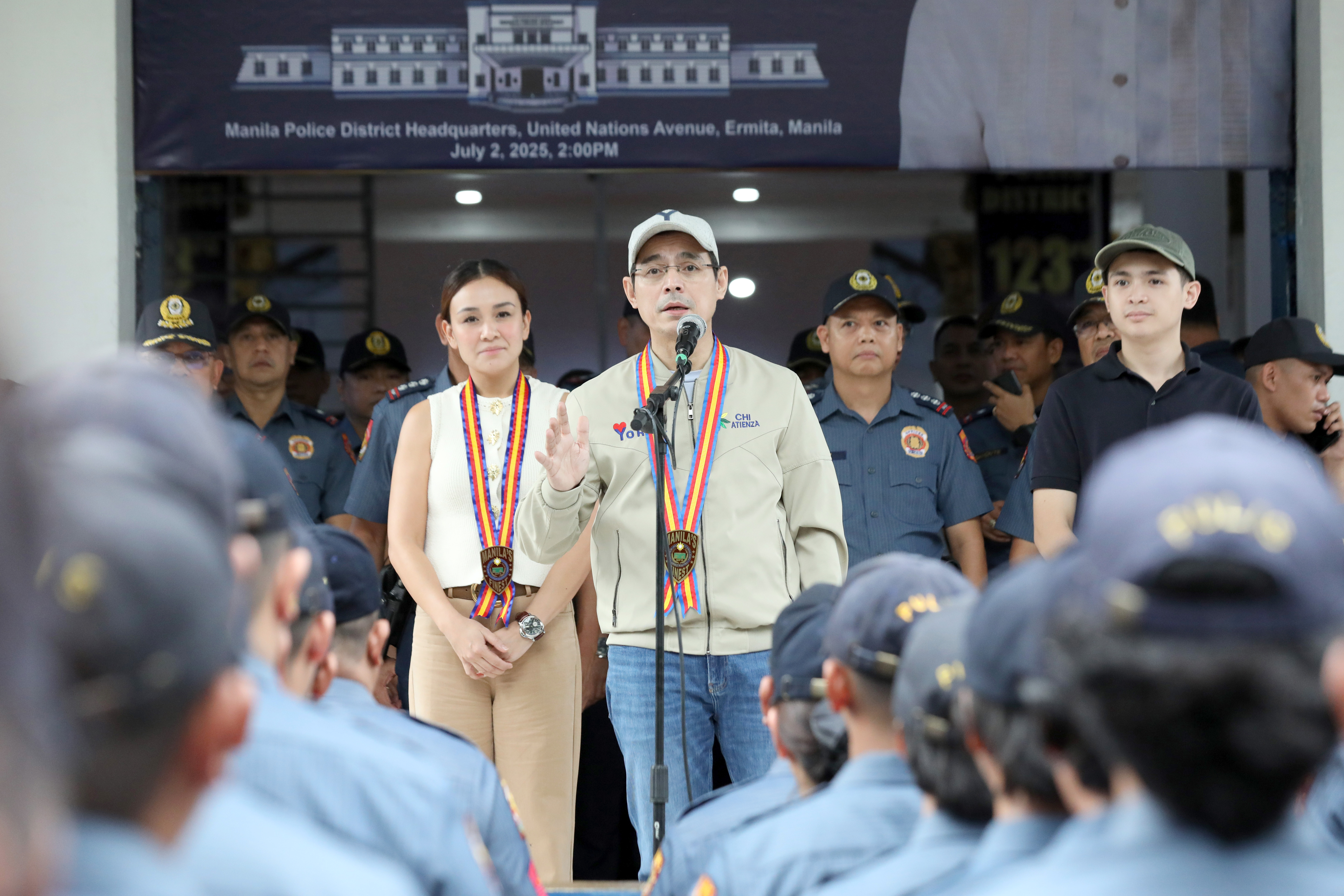
Atienza joins Councilor Joaquin Domagoso (right) and his father Mayor Isko Moreno (center), as the latter addresses the Manila Police District at their headquarters in Ermita, Manila.

Atienza began her term as the 35th vice mayor of Manila on June 30, 2025.

== Personal life ==
Atienza was married to Von Valdepeñas, a former one-term councilor of Los Baños, Laguna. They have three children together.

She had owned a clothing store named Nullah, which is located in Bel-Air, Makati, as of 2005.

Political offices
Preceded by Yul Servo	Vice Mayor of Manila; 2025–present	Incumbent
Party political offices
Vacant Title last held by Roberto Ortega Jr.	Aksyon Demokratiko nominee for Vice Mayor of Manila; 2025	Most recent
Preceded by Yul Servo as Asenso Manileño nominee	Aksyon Demokratiko nominee for Vice Mayor of Manila; 2025	Most recent
