= Alvin Karingal =

Filipino activist

- Born: Alvin Avecilla Karingal; December 5, 1993 (age 32)
- Other name: Fishball King/Warrior/Boy
- Occupation: Activist
- Known for: Advocacy for small vendors and involvement in protests; viral internet personality
- Mother: Meanne Karingal

Alvin Avecilla Karingal (born December 5, 1993), is a Filipino man who rose and later gained attention after his viral appearances during public protests and demonstrations against the flood control project controversy in the Philippines.

== Early life ==
Alvin Avecilla Karingal was born on December 5, 1993 (Note: According to reports, there are conflicting accounts of Karingal's birth year, with some sources stating he was born in 1992, while others indicate 1993.) to Meanne Karingal, and hails from Pandacan, Manila. He studied at Celedonio Salvador Elementary School in Paco and attended secondary school at Erda Technical and Vocational School in Pandacan. He later earned an Alternative Learning System certificate and subsequently enrolled in a computer science course at Informatics on Recto Avenue.

== Run for Manila mayor ==
In 2024, Karingal ran as an independent candidate for mayor of Manila, joining a crowded field of contenders. He was the first to file his certificate of candidacy on October 1, 2024, bringing with him a platform that emphasized improved disaster response and stronger climate change action, citing his own experiences as an affected individual during the onslaught of Typhoon Ketsana (Ondoy) in 2009. While his political bid failed to gain traction, he placed tenth in the race, receiving 508 votes. Karingal remained politically active and continued to express awareness of social issues.

== 2025 Philippine protests ==
On September 21, 2025, Karingal participated in protests in Manila commemorating the anniversary of Martial Law under Ferdinand Marcos. He went viral for being known not for campaigning against corruption but for advocating the lowering of prices of common Filipino street foods such as fish ball, tokneneng, kikiam, and calamares. He was later arrested without a warrant, which prompted public outcry from human rights groups, supporters, and even his mother, who appealed for his release. According to his mother, Karingal was not a fishball [street food] vendor but was simply fond of eating street food. She stated that without his medication, he could experience episodes that might provoke violent reactions from others, and appealed to authorities not to harm him, citing his condition as a person with disability (PWD).

The Manila Police District confirmed that he was in custody, noting that his case was linked to the unrest during the protest. On September 29, Karingal was released after about one week of detention.

On November 30, during the continuation of the Trillion Peso March, Karingal appeared once again, where he suggested that corrupt public officials should be required to perform 30 years of community service as a means of taking responsibility and giving back to the public.

== Personal life ==
In 2018, Karingal was diagnosed with schizophrenia, a mental health condition, later he was identified as a neurodivergent person with disability (PWD). According to some online accounts, Karingal had already been active in protests.
