= Maile Atienza =

Filipino politician from Manila

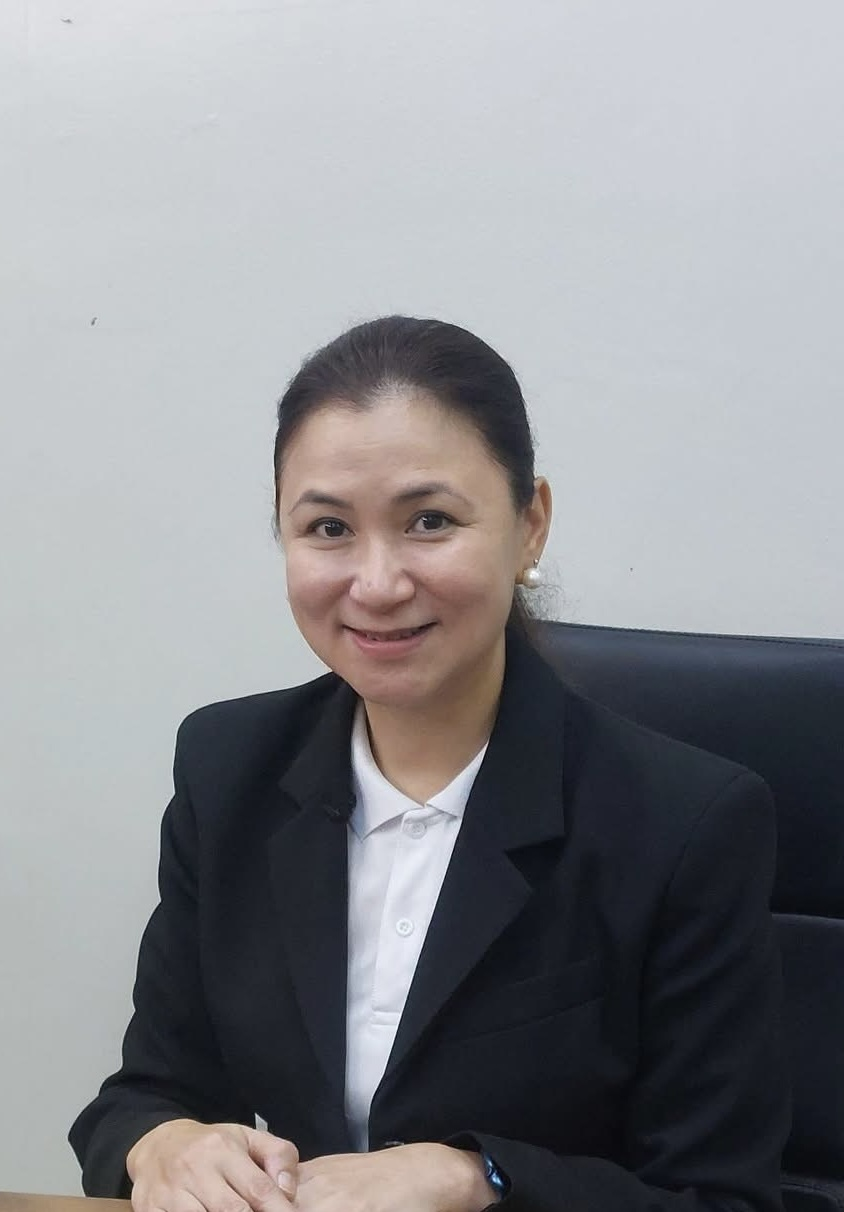
- Atienza in 2025

Member of the Manila City Council from 3rd district
- Incumbent
- Assumed office June 30, 2022
- In office June 30, 2016 – June 30, 2019

Personal details
- Born: Arlene Maile Ilagan Atienza; August 24, 1971 (age 55) Manila, Philippines
- Citizenship: Filipino
- Party: Asenso Manileño (local party; 2021–present)
- Other political affiliations: Aksyon (2021–2024); PMP (2018–2021); UNA (2015–2018)
- Spouse: Miles Roces (separated)
- Children: 3
- Parent: Lito Atienza (father)
- Relatives: Kim Atienza (brother); Ali Atienza (brother); Chi Atienza (sister); Emman Atienza (niece)
- Education: University of the Philippines Manila
- Occupation: Politician

Arlene Maile Ilagan Atienza (born August 24, 1971) is a Filipino politician serving as city councilor of Manila for 3rd district since 2022 and previously from 2016 to 2019. She is the daughter of former Manila Mayor Lito Atienza and sister of TV host Kim Atienza, former Manila councilor Ali Atienza, and Manila Vice Mayor Chi Atienza.

== Education and business career ==
Atienza completed her dentistry degree at the University of the Philippines Manila but did not practice the profession. She also co-owned a shoe store named Shoe-bi-do, which was located in Bel-Air, Makati as of 2005.

== Political career ==
tienza ran for city council seat under United Nationalist Alliance (UNA) which her brother Ali is the vice-mayoral candidate in 2016, and managed to win. She left UNA to join incumbent Mayor Joseph Estrada's Pwersa ng Masang Pilipino for reelection in 2019, but lost.

She joined Asenso Manileño and Isko Moreno's Aksyon for her comeback bid in 2022, and won. In 2025, she stayed under Asenso even though Moreno left and opposed the party's mayoral candidate, incumbent mayor Honey Lacuna, and the party's vice-mayoral candidate, incumbent vice mayor Yul Servo, faced Atienza's sister Chi. She was later re-elected.

== Personal life ==
Atienza had been married to Miles Roces, who last served as representative for Manila's 3rd district from 2004 to 2007, and has three children.

== Electoral history ==
Electoral history of Maile Atienza
Year	Office	Party		Votes received				Result
Year	Office	Local	National	Total	%	P.	Swing	Result
2016	Councilor (Manila–3rd)	—N/a	UNA	50,279	9.56%	4th	—N/a	Won
2019	Councilor (Manila–3rd)	—N/a	PMP	43,061	8.62%	7th	-0.94	Lost
2022	Councilor (Manila–3rd)	Asenso	Aksyon	64,713	11.46%	6th	+1.90	Won
2025	Councilor (Manila–3rd)	Asenso	—N/a	70,075	60.93%	3rd	+49.47	Won
