= Emman Atienza =

Filipino and Taiwanese influencer (2006–2025)

- Atienza in 2024
- Born: Emmanuelle Hung Atienza; February 8, 2006; Manila, Philippines
- Died: October 22, 2025 (aged 19); Santa Monica, California, U.S.
- Cause of death: Suicide by hanging
- Resting place: National Shrine of the Sacred Heart, Makati, Philippines
- Other name: Conyo Final Boss
- Citizenship: Philippines; Taiwan
- Education: International School Manila; Parsons Summer Academy
- Occupations: Social media personality; artist; mental health advocate
- Known for: Mental health advocacy, youth organization Mentality Manila, online content creation
- Notable work: Mentality Manila
- Father: Kim Atienza
- Relatives: Lito Atienza (grandfather); Ali Atienza (uncle); Chi Atienza (aunt); Maile Atienza (aunt)

Instagram information
- Pages: emmanuelle; Mentality Manila
- Years active: Until 2025
- Followers: 310 thousand

TikTok information
- Page: emmanuelle
- Years active: Until 2025
- Followers: 1.1 million

Emmanuelle Hung Atienza (Tagalog pronunciation: [ɐˈtʃɛnsa]; February 8, 2006 – October 22, 2025) was a Filipino and Taiwanese social media personality, model and mental health advocate known for her creative expression and openness about mental health. She was known for her engaging personality, which earned her the sobriquet "Conyo Final Boss" for her fluent English and comedic style. She gained prominence on social media platforms such as TikTok and Instagram.

Atienza was the youngest daughter of Filipino television host Kim Atienza and Taiwanese educator–conservationist Felicia Hung-Atienza and a granddaughter of Filipino politician Lito Atienza. In October 2025, Atienza was found dead at her apartment in Santa Monica, California, at the age of 19. Her death garnered international attention and prompted celebrities to speak up about mental health.

== Early life and education ==
Emmanuelle Hung Atienza was born on February 8, 2006, in Manila, Philippines. She was the youngest of three siblings, Jose III and Eliana, and the daughter of Filipino TV personality Kim Atienza and Taiwanese conservationist Felicia Hung, president of the Philippine Eagle Foundation. She grew up in a bilingual household where English was primarily spoken.

Atienza attended the Chinese International School Manila during her early years and later completed her secondary education at International School Manila. She also participated in the Parsons School of Design Summer Academy in New York, taking an intensive art and design course in 2024. She has accused an unnamed woman, who used to work as her nanny in her childhood, of abuse. According to Atienza, the woman was verbally and physically abusive, made threats against her life, and forced her to be "intimate" when Atienza was still a child.

== Career ==
Atienza began posting creative content on TikTok and Instagram, where she became known for her lighthearted humor, commentary on social issues, and candid self-expression. She said TikTok helped her overcome her struggles, which she attributed to therapy, new friends, and a new environment.

Her engaging personality and wit earned her the moniker "Conyo Final Boss", referring to her fluent English accent and relatable comedic tone. She questioned if being fluent in English and called the "Conyo Final Boss" made her any less Filipino, but she laughed and said, "No, it doesn't make me less Filipino."

In 2023, she joined Sparkle GMA Artist Center's digital influencer division, Status by Sparkle, which described her as "an up-and-coming influencer, fashion lover, and Gen Z personality."

She was also active in modeling and fashion, having attended workshops with Farrah Models Philippines and the Coco Rocha Model Camp in New York, and made her runway debut at Bench Fashion Week in 2022.

Beyond entertainment, Atienza explored art and photography, serving as vice president of the Photography Club at International School Manila and maintaining a separate online page for her artwork. She worked with Liz Uy's Stylized Studio and photographers Meetkeso and Doc Marlon Pecjo for a chic photoshoot.

== Personal life ==
Atienza lived an active lifestyle, participating in gymnastics, ballet, rock climbing, free diving, and swimming as a student-athlete. In 2018, she competed at British School Manila's Spring Invitational Gymnastics Meet, where she won multiple medals.

She had several tattoos, including a butterfly with a musical note on her ear that was inspired by German philosopher Friedrich Nietzsche's quote: "And those who were seen dancing were thought to be insane by those who couldn't hear the music." Her father, Kim Atienza, said that this was her favorite quote. Another tattoo of hers was mambabatok Whang-od's signature "three dots".

=== Health ===
In 2019, following a suicide attempt, Atienza was initially diagnosed with clinical depression. However, she has said that the medication she received was not right for her.

In early 2022, she underwent a more thorough psychiatric evaluation and was diagnosed with complex post-traumatic stress disorder, bipolar disorder, and attention deficit hyperactivity disorder with borderline and paranoid features. In an interview with Tatler Asia, she partially attributed her mental health issues to the abuse that she suffered at the hands of her childhood nanny.

In 2023, Emman's father Kim talked about making an effort to understand Emman's bipolar disorder diagnosis and to provide her with professional help. He acknowledged that, as a member of Gen X, he had initially failed to understand mental health, but realized it was "a matter of life and death" for his daughter after his 18-year-old niece (Emman's first cousin) had died by suicide in 2015.

In an interview in 2024 on Toni Talks with Toni Gonzaga, Atienza said she learned to ignore negative comments and did not let them control her like they had in the past.

Atienza admitted she lied to her therapist about feeling better because she was afraid of disappointing them. Atienza revealed that she had a relapse in self-harm on her birthday in 2024. She said she underwent intensive therapy sessions in Los Angeles to process her past traumas and revealed that she was also "roofied and assaulted." Upon returning to the Philippines, she said she cut off unhealthy habits, environments, and relationships. In August 2025, Atienza relocated to Los Angeles.

== Advocacy and public life ==
Atienza was widely recognized for her mental health advocacy and youth outreach efforts. In 2022, she founded Mentality Manila, a youth-led organization aimed at destigmatizing mental illness and creating safe spaces for conversations on mental health.

Her initiative was rooted in her own lived experiences and years of therapy starting at age twelve.

She also voiced support for social causes, including solidarity actions for Palestine and local volunteer work with One Race for Filipino Services, which aids underprivileged communities.

On social media, she used her platform to discuss mental health recovery, privilege, and resilience, often encouraging empathy and understanding among her followers. Atienza said that she never approached social media for monetary gain, but rather for the joy of expressing herself and engaging with her community.

In 2025, she claimed to have received death threats from Diehard Duterte Supporters, acknowledged that she understood the Philippines as a "very conservative country" and tried to "push back against backward systems," and said she decided to deactivate her TikTok account after struggling to maintain authenticity online.

Her final TikTok post was on October 20, 2025, showing her friends jumping into a lake, hiking, rock climbing, hanging out at the beach, and preparing for Halloween.

=== Controversy ===
In 2022, Atienza showed off her body when netizens said her photos were too "revealing." She responded by posting their comments with the caption, "Lol, can't see the haters." In 2024, Atienza went viral for the "Guess the Bill" challenge, which addressed online criticism over a social media post showing a restaurant bill worth ₱133,423.99 (US$2,709.12). Atienza shared a now-deleted TikTok video with Miss World Philippines 2024 Krishnah Gravidez at a birthday dinner, where they guessed the total cost of their meal and agreed that whoever guessed correctly would pay. She clarified that the event had been sponsored and used the moment to reflect on class awareness, stating she did not deny her privilege and often referred to herself as a "nepo baby."

== Death ==
Atienza's parents announced her death on October 24, 2025. The family did not directly disclose the cause of death, but Los Angeles media, citing the Los Angeles County Department of Medical Examiner, reported that she died by suicide by hanging at her Santa Monica, California, apartment on October 22, 2025, at age 19. Her cremated remains arrived in the Philippines on November 1, while her wake was held at The Heritage Memorial Park in Taguig on November 3–4. Her remains were later inurned at the National Shrine of the Sacred Heart columbarium in Makati.

In an interview with Jessica Soho released in November 2025, Emman's father, Kim, stated that the family became aware of a problem after Emman sent a message to her mother, Felicia Hung-Atienza, indicating that she was in an emergency but not engaging in self-harm and needed to go to a therapy center, although attempts to contact her were unsuccessful while Kim was in the Philippines, Felicia was in Florida, and Emman was in Los Angeles. Two days later, on October 20–21, Kim received a message from his wife conveying "terrible, terrible news" about Emman, and when he called her, she told him, "Emman's gone." Kim revealed that Emman had blocked him on social media and avoided appearing with him in photos or posts to avoid being labeled a "nepo baby."

=== Reactions ===
Her family described her as "a compassionate soul who brought joy, laughter, and love into the lives of everyone who knew her," emphasizing her courage and openness about mental health. Emman's father, Kim Atienza, shared a video on his social media account of Emman performing "Sailor Song" by Gigi Perez in a recording studio. Her paternal grandfather, former Manila mayor Lito Atienza, urged his followers to "accept that we all have an end" and to love their family and friends. Filipino celebrities including Bianca Bustamante, Geneva Cruz, Isabelle Daza, and Gabbi Garcia joined Emman in speaking out about mental health and the quiet struggles that people endure. Bini member Maloi Ricalde expressed her grief with the caption, "Look how words can end a beautiful soul. Do you feel better now?", reflecting sorrow and frustration over the situation.

Anthony Rosaldo paid tribute to Atienza by singing Twila Paris' Christian song "The Warrior Is a Child" at her wake. The Philippine Philharmonic Orchestra and the Madrigal Singers also performed at her wake.

=== Aftermath ===
On November 3, Senator JV Ejercito filed a bill seeking to restrain cyberbullying, fake news, and online defamation, particularly targeting cases that affect young and vulnerable internet users. Ejercito, who is a close friend of Emman's father Kim, referred to it as the Anti-Online Hate and Harassment Bill or the "Emman Atienza Bill". Philippine National Police acting chief Jose Melencio Nartatez said the police welcomed the "Emman Atienza Bill," describing it as a timely update to the existing Cybercrime Prevention Act of 2012. On November 7, the Manila City Council supported the "Emman Atienza Bill" to protect the youth from online bullying, which Vice Mayor Chi Atienza said also honors her niece's mental health advocacy.

On November 4, Bacolod's at-large congressional district representative Albee Benitez filed a bill called the "Emman Act," which seeks to impose fines of up to ₱1 million (US$20,304.57) for certain forms of online harassment. Benitez clarified that public officials would not be covered by the protections provided under the bill. Lawrence Tan, Sparkle's Consulting Head for Talent Imaging and Marketing, said that the campaign would be called "Click Kindness," which was inspired by Atienza's advocacy and would serve as her legacy.

== See also ==
- Mental health in the Philippines
- Social media use in the Philippines
- Social media and suicide
