= Ali Atienza =

Filipino politician, athlete, and newscaster (born 1972)

The Honorable Arnold "Ali" Ilagan Atienza

Executive Director of the Philippine Fiber Industry Development Authority
- Incumbent
- Assumed office January 2025
- Appointed by: Bongbong Marcos

Undersecretary for Government Digital Broadcast Television and the Digitization of the Entertainment Industry Sector at the Department of Information and Communications Technology (DICT)
- In office June 30, 2022 – January 2025
- President: Bongbong Marcos
- Preceded by: Ramon Jacinto

Member of the Manila City Council from the 5th district
- In office June 30, 2013 – June 30, 2016

Chairperson, Manila Sports Council
- In office 2001–2007
- Mayor: Lito Atienza
- Succeeded by: Paul Almario (OIC)

Personal details
- Born: Arnold Ilagan Atienza; September 29, 1972 (age 53) Manila, Philippines
- Party: Lakas (2007–2012; 2018–present)
- Other political affiliations: UNA (2015–2018); KABAKA (2012–2015); Liberal (until 2007)
- Parent: Lito Atienza (father)
- Relatives: Kim Atienza (brother); Maile Atienza (sister); Chi Atienza (sister); Emman Atienza (niece)
- Education: De La Salle University (BS); Pamantasan ng Lungsod ng Maynila (MPA)
- Sports career
- Country: Philippines
- Sport: Taekwondo
Medal record
Representing Philippines
Men's taekwondo
Asian Championships
Gold medal – first place	1994 Manila	Welterweight

Arnold "Ali" Ilagan Atienza (Tagalog pronunciation: [ɐˈtʃɛnsa]; born September 29, 1972), is a Filipino politician, athlete, and newscaster. He was the Presidential Adviser on Youth Affairs from 2005 to 2007 and was concurrently the head of the Manila sports development office and inner city development program from 2001 to 2007. He is the youngest of two sons of former Manila Mayor Lito Atienza, the other being weatherman Kim Atienza.

Atienza first gained fame as a gold medalist for the Philippines taekwondo national team in the 1990s. On March 28, 2007, he formally filed his papers as candidate for Mayor of the City of Manila during the May 14, 2007, mid-term elections. In that election, Sen. Alfredo Lim won the 2007 mayoralty race, and had conceded to Lim.

On February 28, 2021, the Philippine Taekwondo Association conferred upon Atienza with a 5th Dan Blackbelt along with DICT Secretary Gregorio Honasan.

== Personal profile ==
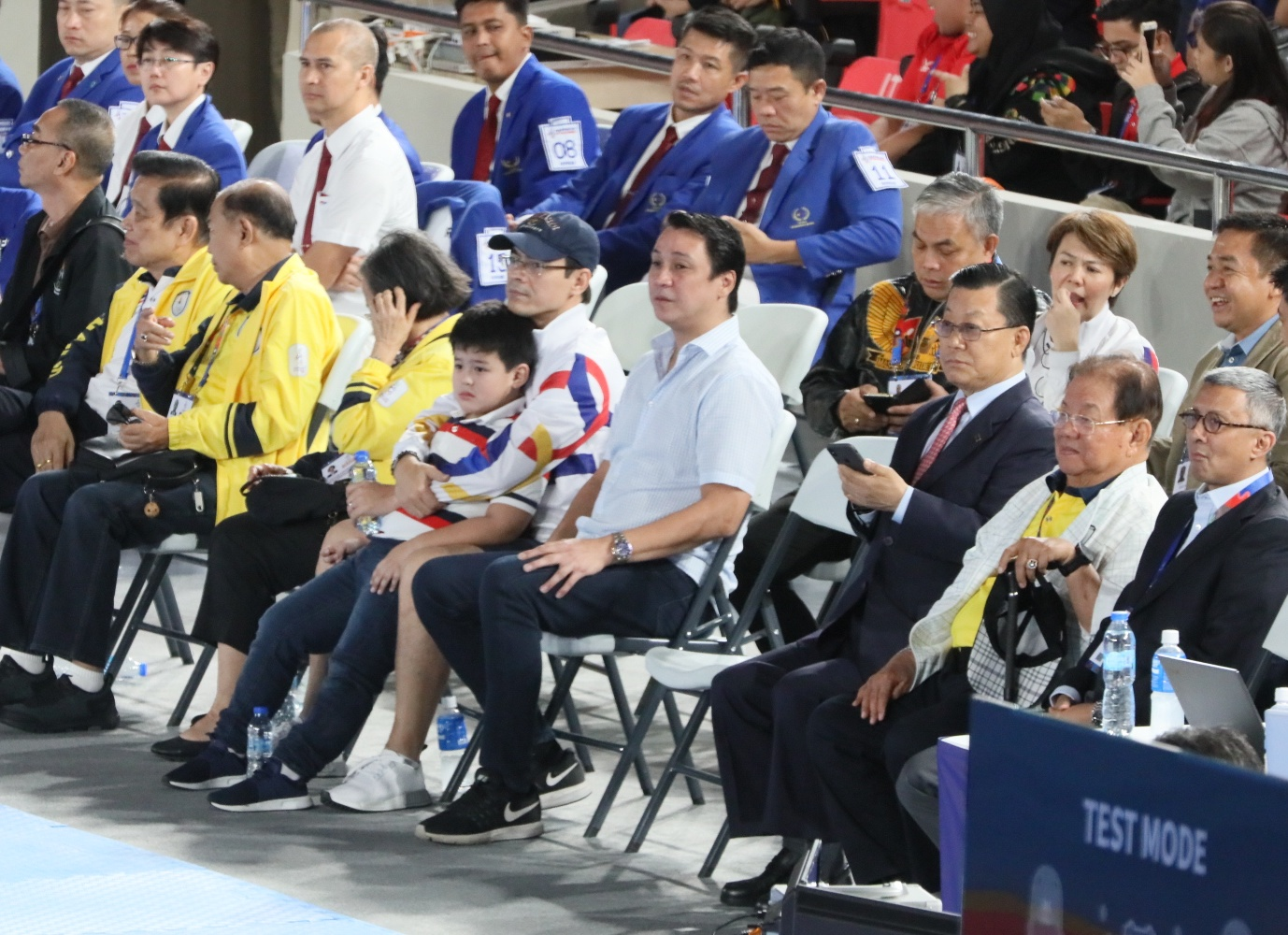
Ali Atienza flanked on his right by then mayor Isko Moreno and on the left by GM Sun Chon Hong and other officials during the taekwondo tournament at the 2019 SEA Games at the Ninoy Aquino Stadium.

Atienza graduated from De La Salle University with a degree BS in Physics, with specialization in Computer Applications, (1989–1994), and earned from the Pamantasan ng Lungsod ng Maynila his master's degree in Government Management. He was the lone gold medalist in the 1994 Asian Taekwondo Championships at the age of 21.

In 2001, he became the youngest chairman of the Manila Sports Council (MASCO) which hosted the Manila Youth Games, the MY National Invitational and Manila Marathons. He also became the Chairman of Manila's inner city development and Manila employment committee where he was able to light the streets of Manila, employ thousands, and provide children from elementary public schools with rice subsidies. He is a former anchor of IBC Express Balita from 2004 to 2007.

== Political career ==
In 2007, he ran for mayor of Manila but lost to a veteran mayor, Alfredo Lim. On November 30, 2010, he was inaugurated as a barangay captain of a barangay in San Andres, Manila after winning the barangay elections.

In 2013, he became the top-notch councilor in the fifth district of Manila garnering almost 80,000 votes. He is considered a voice of the people with his stand on two major issues. First, with his fight against the Manila Bay reclamation and second for his firm stand against the 300% tax increase that the city council has approved.

In 2016, Atienza ran for Vice Mayor as the running mate of congressman Amado Bagatsing and later of former Mayor Alfredo Lim. However, he lost the race to Honey Lacuna.

Ali graduated in 2016 from National University of Singapore under the School of Public Policy in their Senior Management Programme. Atienza ran for congressman of the fifth district of Manila in 2019 but lost to incumbent Cristal Bagatsing.

On December 4, 2020, he was appointed Undersecretary for Government Digital Broadcast Television and the Digitization of the Entertainment Industry Sector at the Department of Information and Communications Technology (DICT). During his tenure, he also handled programs related to education, ease of doing business, persons with disabilities (PWDs), senior citizens, and emerging technologies. He also served as Acting Board Member of Food Terminal Incorporated.

In January 2026, he was appointed Executive Director of the Philippine Fiber Industry Development Authority (PhilFIDA), the government agency responsible for the development and promotion of the country’s natural fiber industries, including abaca, pineapple, and other fiber crops.
