= Juan de Atienza =

Spanish Jesuit missionary

Juan de Atienza (born at Tordehumos, near Valladolid, in Spain, in 1546) was a Spanish Jesuit missionary in South America.

== Life ==
He was the eldest son of the royal Councillor of Castile, Bartolome de Atienza, a distinguished jurisconsult under Charles V of Spain. He studied law at the University of Salamanca, but in 1564 forsook the legal career in order to become a Jesuit.

While in Spain, he was Prefect of the College of Ávila, Procurator of the Province of his order, founder of the College of Villa Garcia, its rector and master of novices, and rector of the College of Valladolid. He learned of a call for fifty Jesuits, to be sent to Peru; he asked permission to become one of their number.

He reached Lima in 1581 and found there his appointment as rector of the College of San Pablo. In that capacity he was surrogate to the Provincial, Baltasar de Piñas, and founded, under the direction of the Company of Jesus, the College of San Martin, the first school of secular learning established at Lima. The foundation of that school was confirmed by Pope Sixtus V, in 1585, and Atienza became its first rector.

In 1580 he was made Provincial of the Jesuits in Peru. He fostered and extend the missions in Ecuador, the Gran Chaco, Tucuman and Paraguay. Out of these efforts the province of Paraguay was born in 1607. During that period a printing press was established by the Jesuits at the Indian village of Juli. Jointly with Jose de Acosta, he directed the publication of catechisms and textbooks of Christian doctrine for the use of the Indians. These religious primers were printed between the years 1583 and 1590, at Lima. They are in Spanish, Quichua, and Aymará.
