= Isko Moreno =

Mayor of Manila (born 1974)

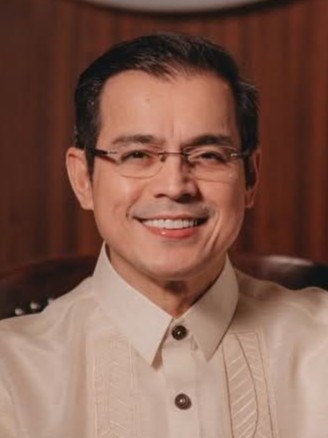
- Official portrait, 2025

27th and 29th Mayor of Manila
- Incumbent
- Assumed office June 30, 2025
- Vice Mayor: Chi Atienza
- Preceded by: Honey Lacuna
- In office June 30, 2019 – June 30, 2022
- Vice Mayor: Honey Lacuna
- Preceded by: Joseph Estrada
- Succeeded by: Honey Lacuna

33rd Vice Mayor of Manila
- In office June 30, 2007 – June 30, 2016
- Mayor: Alfredo Lim (2007–2013); Joseph Estrada (2013–2016)
- Preceded by: Danny Lacuna
- Succeeded by: Honey Lacuna

Member of the Manila City Council from the 1st district
- In office June 30, 1998 – June 30, 2007
Appointive positions held
Undersecretary of Social Welfare and Development for Luzon Affairs and Special Concerns
In office May 11, 2018 – October 11, 2018
President	Rodrigo Duterte
Chairman and CEO of the North Luzon Railways Corporation
In office July 1, 2017 – October 27, 2017
Party positions held
President of Aksyon Demokratiko
Incumbent
Assumed office August 12, 2021
Preceded by	Robi Pierre Roco

Personal details
- Born: Francisco Moreno Domagoso; October 24, 1974 (age 52) Tondo, Manila, Philippines
- Party: Aksyon Demokratiko (since 2021)
- Other political affiliations: See list: NUP (2016–2021); PMP (2012–2016); UNA (2012–2014); Nacionalista (2009–2012); Asenso Manileño (2005–2024); PDP–Laban (2004–2009); Liberal (1998–2004)
- Spouse: Diana Lynn Ditan (m. 2000)
- Children: 5, including Joaquin
- Education: Philippine Maritime Institute (dropped out); International Academy of Management and Economics (BS); Pamantasan ng Lungsod ng Maynila (BPA); Arellano University (LLB; did not complete)
- Occupation: Actor; television personality; politician; producer; entrepreneur
- Website: Official campaign website
- Nickname: "Yorme"
- Agent: Sparkle GMA Artist Center (2023–present)

YouTube information
- Channel: Isko Moreno Domagoso
- Years active: 2020–present
- Genres: News; vlogs; celebrity interviews; comedy
- Subscribers: 554k
- Views: 91.4 million
- Last updated: July 15, 2026

Francisco "Isko" Moreno Domagoso (Tagalog: [isˈkɔʔ mɔˈɾɛ.nɔ dɔ.maˈɡɔ.sɔ]; born October 24, 1974) is a Filipino politician, actor, host and entrepreneur who has served as the 29th mayor of Manila, the capital city of the Philippines, since 2025. The president of Aksyon Demokratiko, he previously served as the 27th mayor from 2019 to 2022 and was the party's candidate for president in the 2022 election.

Born and raised in the slums of Tondo, Manila, Moreno spent his childhood in poverty. He rose to fame as a matinee idol in a minor role in May Minamahal (1993), before transitioning to mature roles. He entered politics in 1998 after being elected to the Manila City Council where he served until 2007. At the same time, he pursued non-degree postgraduate education at Harvard Kennedy School and Oxford Saïd Business School on the advice of his mentor Danny Lacuna.

Moreno was elected vice mayor in 2007 and served three full terms under the mayoralties of Alfredo Lim and Joseph Estrada. Upon being term-limited, unsuccessfully ran for senator in the 2016 senatorial elections under Grace Poe's Senate slate, placing 16th out of 50 candidates. Following his loss, President Rodrigo Duterte appointed him as an undersecretary of social welfare. He would hold the position May to October 2018 before successfully running for mayor of Manila in the 2019 election, where he defeated his predecessors in a landslide victory, becoming the youngest mayor of Manila since the People Power Revolution.

During his first term, Moreno was regarded as one of the top-performing local chief executives in the Philippines; he has described his leadership style as akin to that of his predecessor Alfredo Lim, citing their shared commitment to reducing crime and maintaining the cleanliness of the capital. Moreno is also noted for his streetwise public image due to his use of colorful language coupled with Manila street slang. As a result, he is colloquially referred to as Yorme. (Note: A verlan backslang metathesis of the English word "mayor", which is used in Taglish and reversed phonemically as part of Filipino/Tagalog street slang.) His political career has been met with positive-to-mixed critical reception, gaining praise for his political will, efficiency, hands-on leadership, people skills, non-partisanism on designations, and results-oriented performance, but criticism for his sporadic spontaneous outspoken remarks, over-the-top populist tendencies, and lack of permanence to a national political party, although he remained a constant member since the inception of Asenso Manileño until 2024, a local party he co-founded.

In September 2021, Moreno announced his bid for the Philippine presidency in the 2022 presidential election, in which he finished fourth out of 10 candidates.

Having served in the government for 24 years, Moreno has received numerous recognitions for his public service. He is widely credited for "restoring Manila to its former glory within a short period of time", despite disinformation against him by political rivals. He is generally known for his firm implementation of city services, beautification of derelict historical sites, and leading the establishment of city infrastructure. He announced his first retirement from politics after his mayoral term ended on June 30, 2022, and ventured into business, content creation, and television hosting. In 2024, Moreno announced his return to politics, running once again for Mayor of Manila in the 2025 Philippine general election. He regained the mayoralty through a landslide victory, defeating erstwhile ally and incumbent Mayor Honey Lacuna.

== Early life ==
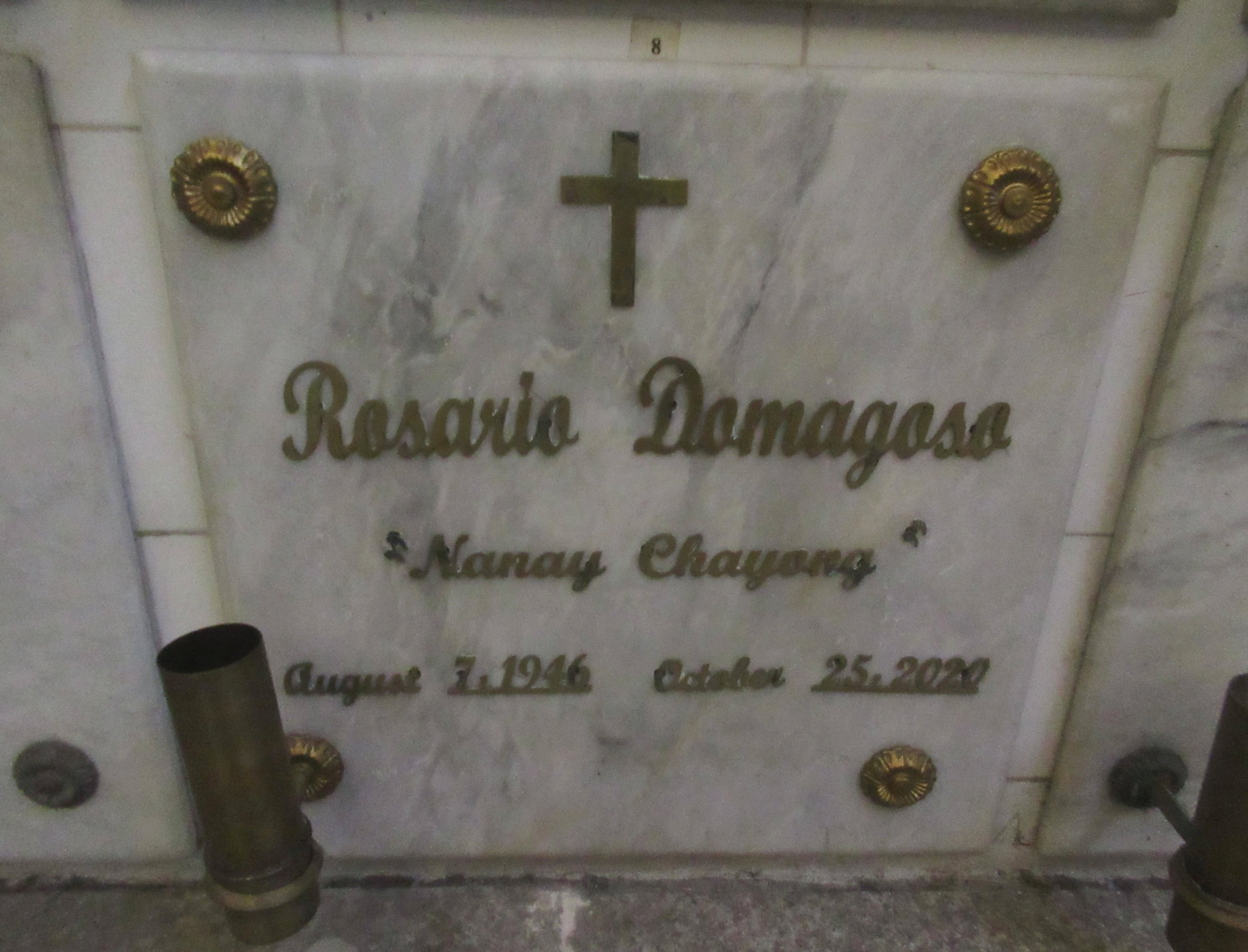
Domagoso's mother Rosario's grave at San Agustin Church (Manila).

Francisco Moreno Domagoso is the only child of Visayan parents Joaquin Copias Domagoso (1930–1995), a stevedore at Manila's North Harbor, from San Jose de Buenavista, Antique, and Rosario Moreno (1946–2020) from Allen, Northern Samar, a housewife, laundrywoman and garlic peeler. Isko's parents were not married when he was born and he has older half-siblings from his father's first family. Born and raised in the slums of Tondo, Manila where he was once nicknamed as "Scott", Moreno spent his childhood in poverty: at age 10, he made a living as a waste picker, drove a passenger pedicab and rummaged through restaurant garbage bins for leftover food that his mother would recook for dinner. Moreno attended Rosauro Almario Elementary School and Tondo High School, both public schools in Tondo, Manila. From his savings, Moreno briefly enrolled in maritime engineering at the Philippine Maritime Institute in 1992, for one semester every year, but dropped out when he entered the entertainment business after he was discovered in 1993 by a talent scout who encouraged him to audition for That's Entertainment, a popular teen-variety show, as a way for him to relieve his family's poverty. Moreno subsequently got the part and adopted the screen name "Isko Moreno" using his mother's surname.

== Acting career ==
In 1993, when an 18-year-old Moreno was attending a wake of a neighbor, he was persuaded by a talent scout to join show business thanks to his matinee idol image and boyish features. His first acting job was an extra in an episode for the RPN teen drama show Young Love, Sweet Love, which was previously hosted by German Moreno. Isko auditioned for the seventh batch and became a part of the Monday group of German Moreno's daily variety show That's Entertainment, under the screen name Isko Moreno. He was once paired up with former child star Bamba during his early days in That's Entertainment. Moreno's big break came in when he was cast in a minor role in the 1993 romantic movie May Minamahal and became a leading man to Claudine Barretto in Muntik na Kitang Minahal a year later. He then starred in a variety of films and television shows in genres including drama, romance, action, and comedy.

Moreno later became known for his "mature" roles and modeling during his short career in the "ST/titillating films" (erotic films) genre that was popular in the country during the 1990s and appeared in movies Siya'y Nagdadalaga, Exploitation, Mga Babae sa Isla Azul and Misteryosa.

In 2004, Moreno made a cameo appearance on his life story featured on Maalaala Mo Kaya, in the episode titled "Aklat", where he was portrayed by Danilo Barrios. In 2005, during his third term as a councilor of Manila, he returned to acting, portraying a kind-hearted priest in the television drama series Mga Anghel na Walang Langit, in a supporting role. He also had a brief appearance in 2007 in the television drama series Bakekang. The following year, during his first term as vice mayor, Moreno had a supporting role in the afternoon soap opera Ligaw na Bulaklak.

In 2014, he appeared in the Japanese lifestyle variety show Homecoming, where it was revealed that he is a godfather of then-AKB48 member, Sayaka Akimoto, according to photo documentations by Akimoto's Filipina mother, as the episode showed Akimoto traveling to the Philippines to explore her Filipino roots. He was visited and interviewed on the show by Akimoto, her mother, Akimoto's fellow AKB48 co-member Mariko Shinoda, and comedian Hiroshi.

In 2019, Moreno appeared in the film 3pol Trobol: Huli Ka Balbon! as Yorme, a former mayor of Balete, Batangas, and leader of a horse ranch as well as an old friend of the Philippine president. He also made a cameo appearance in the 24th anniversary special of Bubble Gang.

A musical biographical film based on Moreno's life, Yorme: The Isko Domagoso Story, was released on January 21, 2022, and was distributed by Viva Films. Raikko Mateo, McCoy de Leon, and Xian Lim portrayed Moreno in different times of his life, with Moreno also appearing as himself.

In November 2022, it was announced that Moreno would play the role of former Senator Ninoy Aquino in the Darryl Yap film Martyr or Murderer, which was released on theaters on March 1, 2023. He returned again to acting in television by joining the Ruru Madrid-led action series Black Rider in 2024.

== Early political career ==
=== Manila City Council (1998–2007) ===
Moreno started his political career in 1998 when he was elected and sworn in as councilor under then-Mayor Lito Atienza for Manila's first legislative district at age 23, the youngest-elected councilor in Manila's history at that time. Initially a decision made on a whim, he was re-elected in 2001 and 2004 in topnotch victories. His programs include the "ISKOlar ng Bayan" college scholarship program, the Isko Moreno Computer Learning Center (ISCOM), the "Botika ni Isko" which was the only pharmacy in the country installed within a public office, and the establishment of daycare centers in the first district. After receiving criticism from other members of the city council especially for being a high school graduate, his mentor, then-vice mayor Danny Lacuna, encouraged him to study while fulfilling his duties. In 2003, Moreno obtained a business administration degree from the International Academy of Management and Economics in Makati. He also took a crash course in local legislation and local finance at the National College of Public Administration and Governance, University of the Philippines Diliman. He then completed bachelor in public administration at Pamantasan ng Lungsod ng Maynila (University of the City of Manila). He also attended non-degree programs, fellowships, and short courses in leadership and governance at John F. Kennedy School of Government, Harvard University (Executive Education Program), and at Saïd Business School, University of Oxford (Strategic Leadership Programme). It was also Lacuna who financed Moreno's studies.

=== Vice mayor of Manila (2007–2016) ===
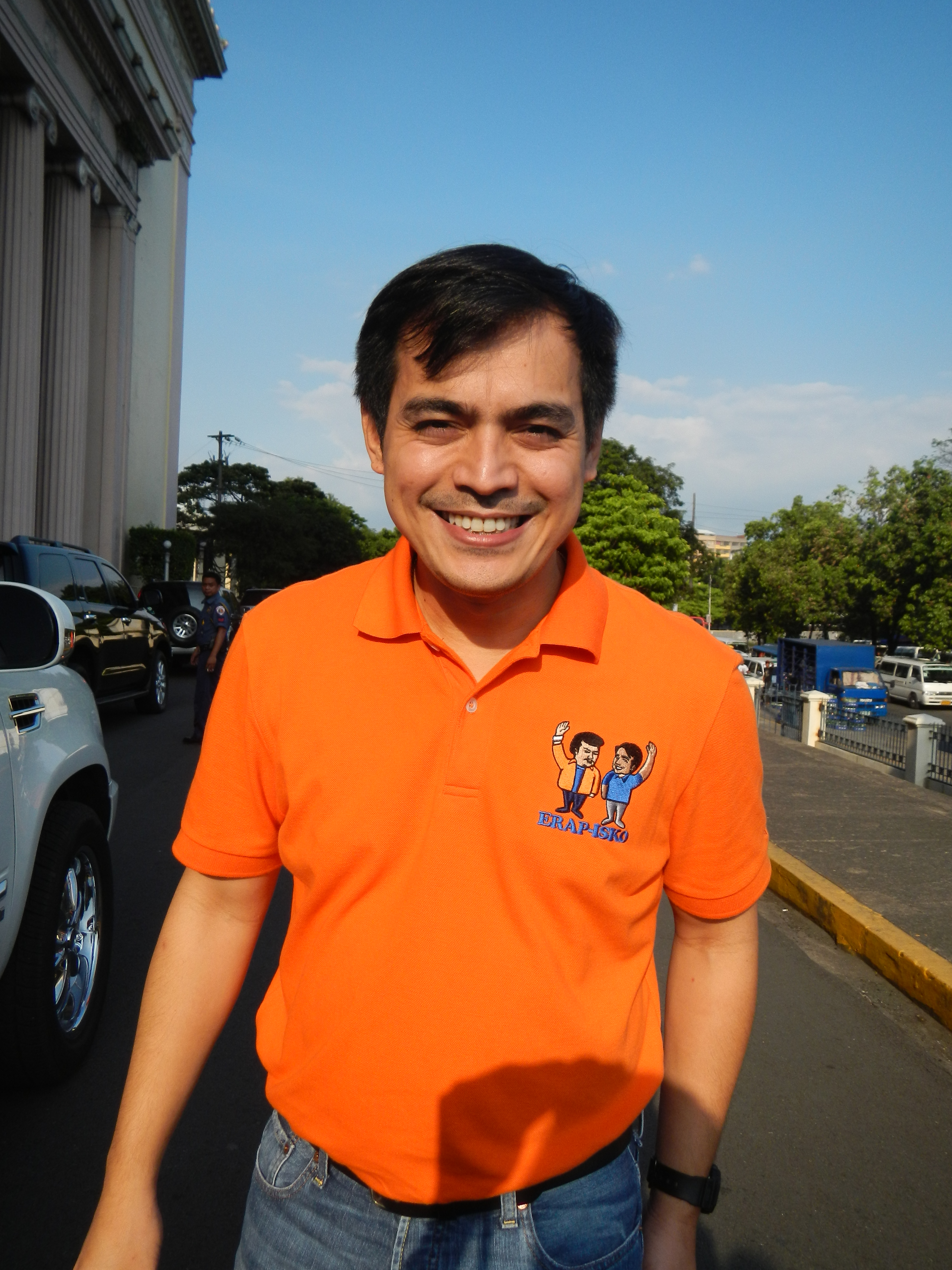
Vice Mayor Moreno in 2012

After his third and final term as city councilor, Moreno ran for vice mayor in 2007 under Asenso Manileño, a local party he co-founded with Danilo Lacuna in 2005, as the running mate of then outgoing vice mayor Lacuna. During his election campaign, he criticised what he called "black propaganda" by opponents who used photographs from his past "sexy" acting career but did not pursue any charges. Moreno eventually won the elections, beating his closest rival by about 80,000 votes; however, Lacuna lost to Senator and former Manila Mayor Alfredo Lim of the Liberal Party. At 32, Moreno became one of the youngest-elected vice mayors in Manila's history. Moreno studied law at Arellano University School of Law but dropped in his second year when he was elected as vice mayor of Manila for the first time. He was re-elected in 2010, this time under Nacionalista Party and as the running mate of then-incumbent Mayor Lim. Both Lim and Moreno took part in the negotiation of the Manila hostage crisis until it was taken over by the police. Moreno had criticised the national government's urgency on the matter, saying the national government should have intervened early because foreign nationals were involved.

Moreno also served as vice chairman of the Manila Historical and Heritage Commission. In 2011, Moreno was chosen to visit Washington, D.C., under the International Visitor Leadership Program (IVLP) sponsored by the US State Department, the only Filipino participant of their group.

Between 2012 and 2013, the Commission on Audit (COA) found Moreno's office had 623 ghost employees. Cases were filed against him but were dismissed by the Office of the Ombudsman. Moreno said he believed the allegations were politically motivated and headed by Mayor Lim, which resulted in them falling out. Moreno said he was only the signatory of the disbursement of the city council's employees and that the Office of the City Treasurer disburses employee salaries. The Manila Regional Trial Court ordered the reinstatement of Moreno's employees, whom the court declared as unlawfully terminated by Lim. Judge Daniel Villanueva dismissed Lim's allegations that some of the terminated workers could be ghost employees.

In May 2012, Joseph Estrada, the 13th president of the Philippines, announced his intention to run for mayor of Manila in the 2013 local election against the incumbent mayor Lim, but only for one term to make way for Moreno afterwards. Moreno, who was running for re-election as vice mayor in his third-and-last consecutive term, was chosen as Estrada's running mate. Estrada drove his "Jeep ni Erap" from San Juan to his new house at Altura Street, Sampaloc, Manila (near Santa Mesa), to ceremonially launch his candidacy. He was joined by his wife, former senator Loi Ejercito, and Moreno. Moreno then joined Estrada's party Pwersa ng Masang Pilipino (PMP) and United Nationalist Alliance (UNA), which was then in coalition with PDP-Laban.

On February 16, 2013, months before the election, police arrested and detained Moreno and five other councilors due to alleged bingo operations held in a public place and a lack of permit. Moreno denied the bingo game was in a public place in Santa Cruz, Manila, because they were in a private property and did not cause obstruction. Moreno said he believed Mayor Lim was involved in his arrest but Lim refuted this. Moreno said the bingo game was not illegal because there was no wager involved and the cards were given for free. Moreno also said the bingo session was initiated for entertainment purposes to attract people to attend their consultation program. In his defense, Moreno said there is no law that requires anyone to obtain a permit from the local government unit if the bingo games were intended purely for entertainment purposes, especially when being done in a private, gated compound. The day before, Lim and Estrada signed a "peace covenant" to prevent election-related violence in Manila. Moreno and the other councilors were released a day later, and the gambling charges were eventually dismissed by the Department of Justice due to lack of evidence and vague allegations. The police complainants also failed to cite a particular provision of the law that was violated. Moreno was re-elected in May 2013, and Estrada defeated Lim to become the new mayor of Manila.

The Campaign Finance Office of the Commission on Elections (COMELEC) filed a complaint against Moreno in May 2017 for overspending in the 2013 elections, saying Moreno exceeded expenditure limits by over ₱100,000 in his final vice-mayoral bid. In his counter-affidavit that was received by COMELEC in October 2020, Moreno said his declared spending was a "simple and honest oversight" due to variances and un-reconciled accounts, and the mistake was in good faith. He later adjusted his expense report where the amended sum fell within campaign spending limits. Under Republic Act No. 7166, a candidate with political-party support who is standing for neither the positions of president or vice president may spend only up to ₱3.00 per registered voter in his or her constituency. Several poll watchdogs have echoed support for Moreno and have campaigned for the revision of an outdated spending cap because they said such law, which was enacted in 1991, no longer reflected actual spending, and that such action would make the disclosure of candidates and political parties more truthful. Under the poll body's Rules of Procedure, preliminary investigations on election offenses must be terminated within 20 days after the receipt of counter-affidavits, after which a resolution should be made within five days. However, there has been no resolution on the case since then and it is unlikely to bring the case to court because COMELEC may be found guilty of "inordinate and oppressive delay". In its defense, COMELEC said the slow pace of the procedures is "usual" due to unclear delegation and delineation of functions.

In September 2014, five barangay chairpersons from Tondo filed a plunder complaint against Moreno and several other city officials in Manila with the Office of the Ombudsman for allegedly diverting real property tax shares amounting to ₱77 million to a "dummy" barangay in late 2013. Moreno said the accusations were politically motivated. According to him, the dummy barangay the complainants were referring to was Barangay 128 in Smokey Mountain. Moreno also said the funds they gave to Smokey Mountain, as well as the poor barangays in Parola and Baseco, were "floating funds" from uninhabited barangays in the city's piers, and that such action was a "normal proceeding" since the time of former mayors Lito Atienza and Alfredo Lim. Moreno alleged the complainants wanted to take a share of the funds but failed to properly request them. Moreno said he and his co-defendants were willing to face the allegations but there had been no official report or publicly available update from the Office of the Ombudsman regarding the complaint.

Also during his tenure as vice mayor, Moreno was elected the National President of the Vice Mayors' League of the Philippines (VMLP) from 2008 to 2016, and the first Vice President of the Union of Local Authorities of the Philippines (ULAP) from 2014 to 2016. He was also the Chairman Emeritus of the Kaagapay ng Manileño Foundation from 2007 to 2010.

=== 2016 Philippine Senate campaign ===
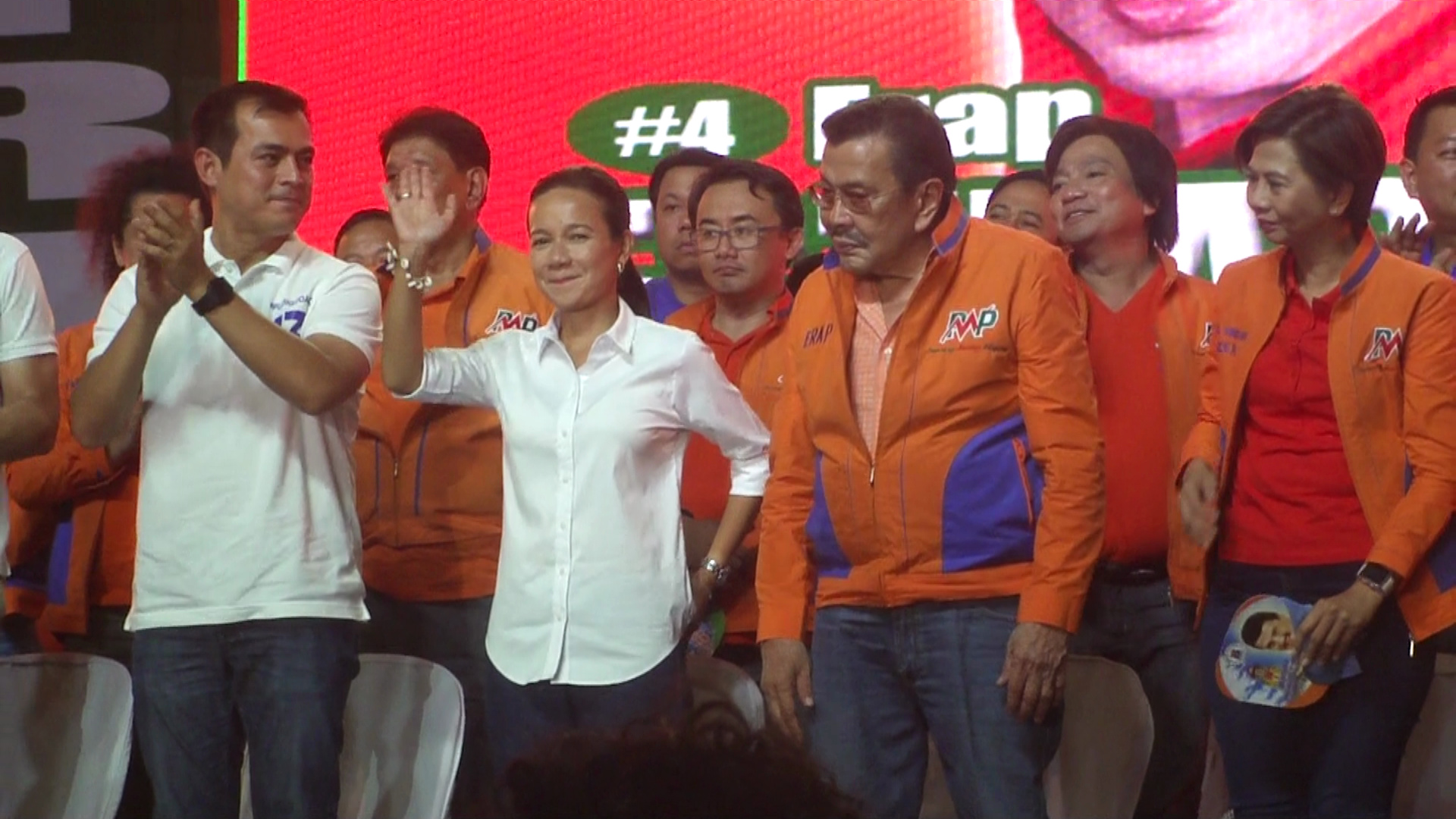
Joseph Estrada's (second from right) election campaign rally in Tondo, Manila in 2016 along with Isko Moreno (left), Grace Poe (second from left), and Honey Lacuna (right)

In 2015, Moreno announced he would run for senator of the Philippines in 2016 after incumbent Mayor Joseph Estrada decided to run for another term. He was named as part of the senatorial slate of presidential candidate and Senator Grace Poe's Partido Galing at Puso coalition and as an adopted senatorial candidate of Senator Bongbong Marcos, who was then running for vice president. He lost in his bid, placing 16th overall. He received the biggest campaign contributions and donations by any senatorial candidate that year through pooled funds from donors. Moreno declared and paid the obligated taxes from his ₱50 million unused campaign donations as stated in his mandatory income tax return, in compliance with the law. Other candidates who also declared excess campaign donations during that year were Grace Poe, Jejomar Binay, Rodrigo Duterte, Leni Robredo and Francis Escudero. Moreno is among the first few candidates who settled their obligations on excess campaign donations early. Moreno's declaration was sensationalized six years later in 2022 by political rivals even though the Commission on Elections affirmed Moreno's response, stating "there are no rules requiring its disposition in any specific way", confirming Moreno did not violate any law. Moreno later stated he believed the legislature should pass a corresponding law or new set of rules to govern excess campaign donations. His term as vice mayor of Manila ended on June 30, 2016, and he was succeeded by Honey Lacuna, daughter of his mentor Danny Lacuna.

=== Duterte administration (2016–2019) ===
Moreno was appointed by President Rodrigo Duterte and served as an external peace consultant for the urban poor of the National Democratic Front of the Philippines (NDFP), the Communist Party of the Philippines' (CPP) popular front, in its peace negotiations with the Duterte administration in 2016 and 2017. He attended peace talks with the CPP-NPA-NDFP held in the Netherlands, Oslo, and Rome as an independent observer, along with members of the Government of the Philippines (GRP) before Duterte formally terminated the talks in late 2017. Aside from his role in the peace talks, Moreno refuted having communist ties.

In July 2017, Duterte appointed Moreno as chairman of the board and chief executive officer of the government-owned-and-controlled North Luzon Railways Corporation (NorthRail). Moreno resigned from the post in October 2017, citing personal reasons.

In May 2018, Moreno was appointed by Duterte as undersecretary for Luzon affairs and special concerns at the Department of Social Welfare and Development. On October 11, 2018, he resigned from this post to run for mayor of Manila in the 2019 election and challenge his former ally, incumbent Mayor Joseph Estrada, with incumbent Vice Mayor Honey Lacuna as Moreno's running mate. Moreno and Estrada had not been on speaking terms following Moreno's failed senatorial bid in 2016.

=== Mayor of Manila (2019–2022) ===
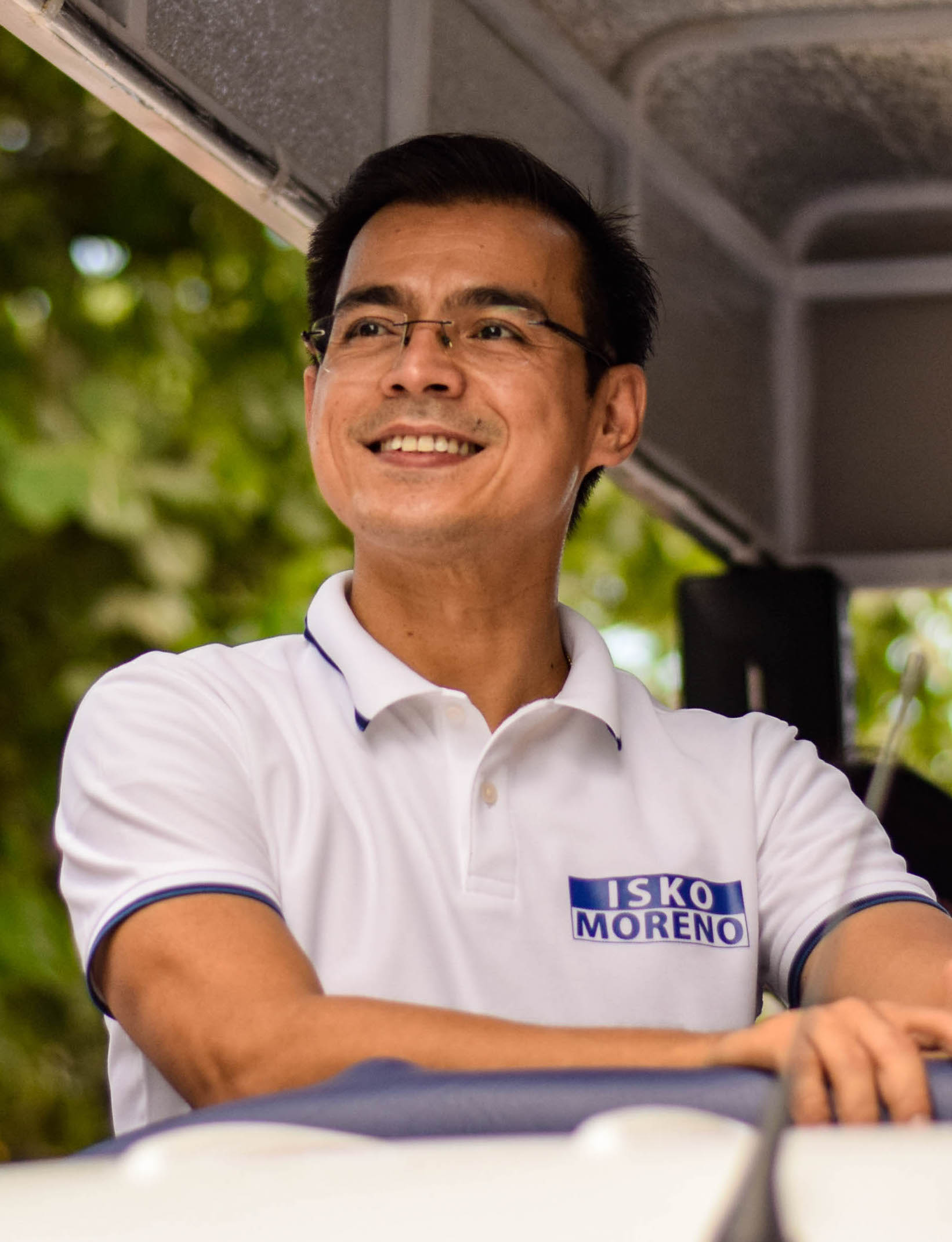
Moreno campaigning for mayor in 2019

Moreno served as the 27th Mayor of Manila—the 23rd person to hold the position—following his win in the 2019 Manila local elections, in which he defeated both of his predecessors Alfredo Lim and the incumbent mayor Joseph Estrada. At 44, Moreno became the youngest person to become mayor of Manila since Antonio Villegas, who became mayor at age 34 upon the death of Arsenio Lacson in 1962. Moreno and Lim reconciled after the elections and remained on good terms until Lim's death in 2020. Moreno's first 100 days in office were met with positive response. President Duterte praised Moreno, saying: "He is better than me to be honest. I see that his resolve is stronger than mine." (Note: transl. "Mas mahusay siya kaysa sa akin sa totoo lang. May nakita ako na mas mahusay ang resolve niya kaysa sa akin")

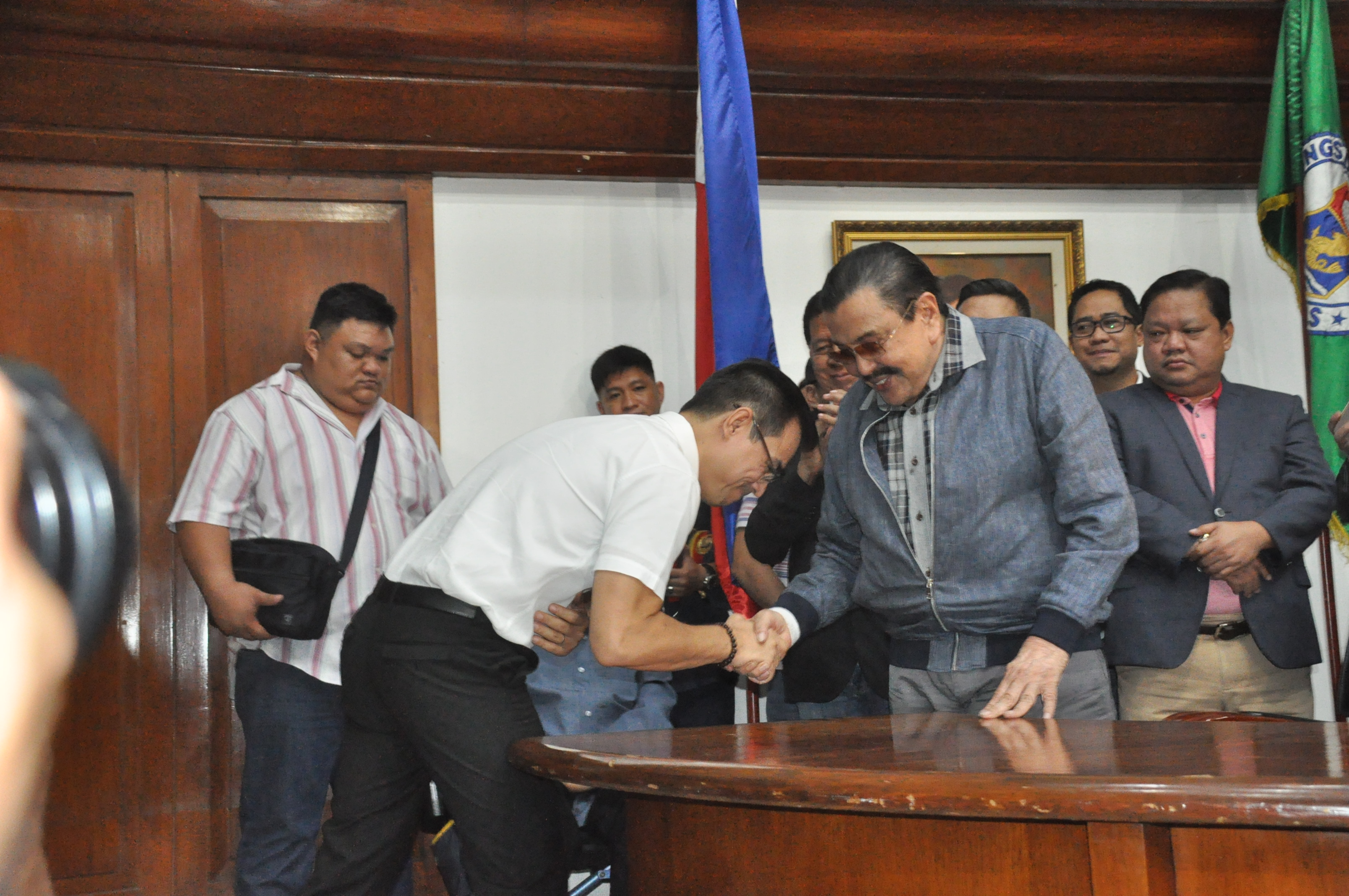
Moreno paying a courtesy visit to then outgoing mayor Joseph Estrada (second from right) weeks after defeating the latter in the 2019 local elections

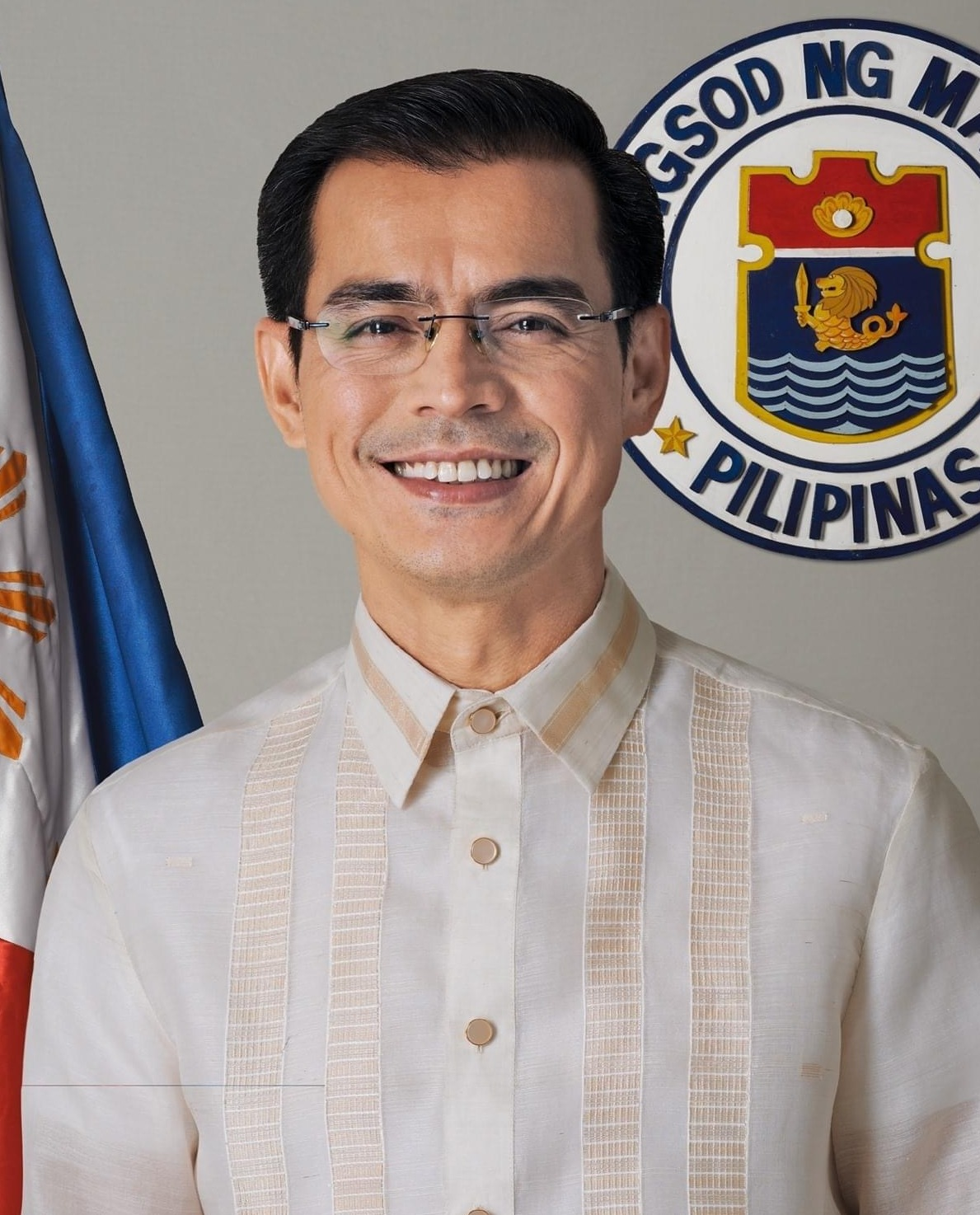
Moreno's official portrait, 2019

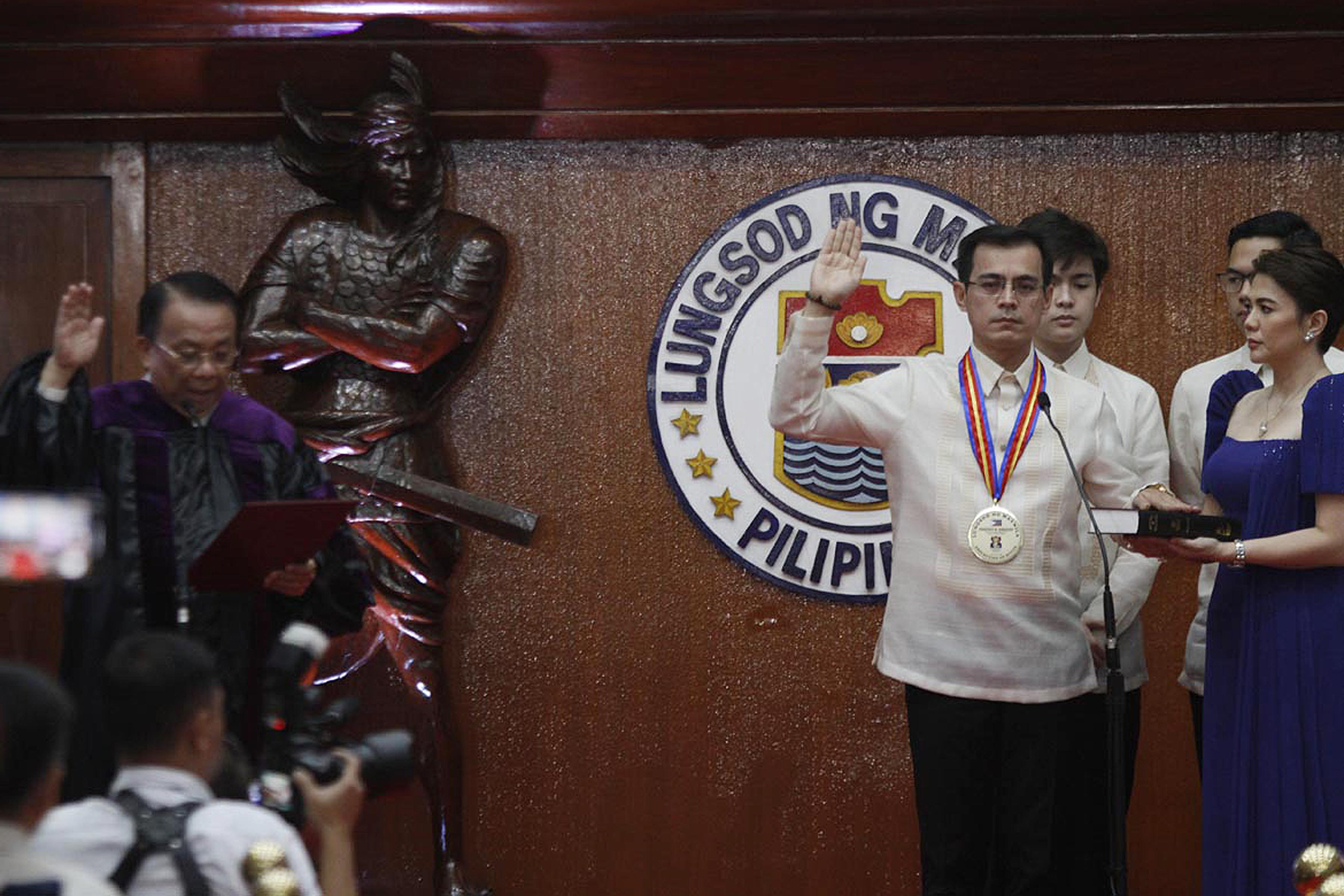
Moreno taking his oath as mayor before then-Chief Justice Lucas Bersamin (far left), with his wife Dynee Ditan Domagoso (far right) as his Bible bearer

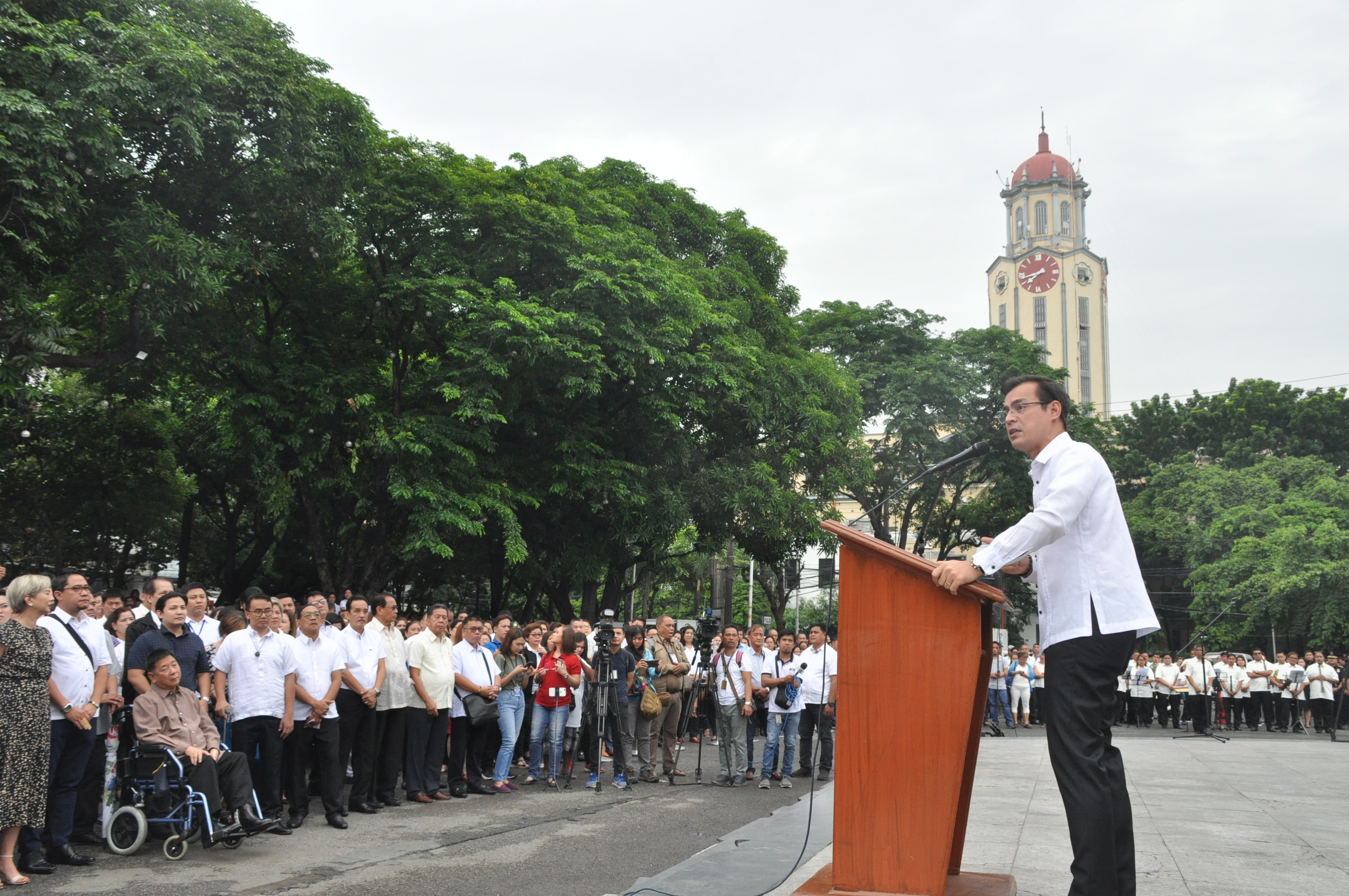
Moreno addressing his constituents at the Bonifacio Shrine beside the Manila City Hall in July 2019

As part of his advocacy for meritocracy, Moreno promoted several long-time, well-performing employees of Manila City Hall and claimed he would hire new employees based on qualifications regardless of political affiliation.

Moreno's term as mayor of Manila ended on June 30, 2022, and he was succeeded by his vice mayor and party-mate Honey Lacuna.

==== City services and infrastructure ====
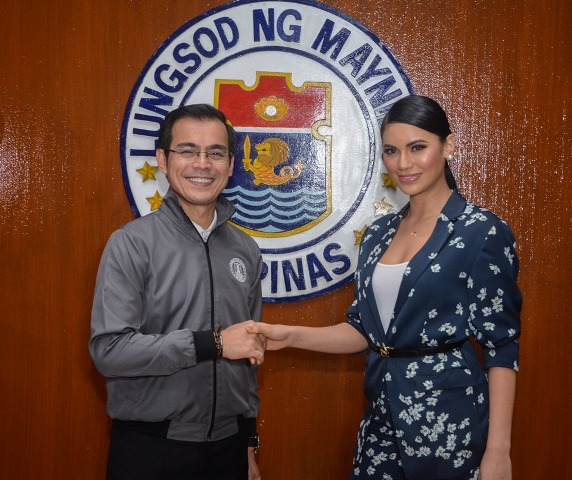
Moreno with Miss Universe Philippines 2019 Gazini Ganados at Manila City Hall in 2019

Moreno signed an ordinance that gives a monthly allowance of ₱1,000 to each student of the University of the City of Manila and Universidad de Manila, the first in the country. The ordinance also gives Grade 12 students in Manila's public schools a ₱500 monthly allowance to be received via "cash cards".

Moreno also signed an ordinance that granted a ₱500 monthly allowance to senior citizens, persons with disabilities (PWDs), and solo parents who reside in the capital. The elderly were also to receive ₱800 and a cake as a birthday gift from the city government, on top of their ₱500 monthly allowance.

Moreno's infrastructure projects and beautification programs included the redevelopment of the historic Jones Bridge, the construction of a 10-story, 384-bed building for the Bagong Ospital ng Maynila to replace the Ospital ng Maynila Medical Center, which will be converted into the College of Medicine and Allied Health Sciences Campus of the Pamantasan ng Lungsod ng Maynila. Moreno's projects also include the redevelopment of Manila Zoo, which reopened on December 30, 2021. Also one of Moreno's projects is the Flora V. Valisno de Siojo Dialysis Center at the Gat Andres Bonifacio Memorial Medical Center, then the country's largest free dialysis facility named after former mayor Alfredo Lim's grandmother.

Moreno also began the construction and inauguration of Manila Islamic Cemetery and Cultural Hall within Manila South Cemetery, the city's first cemetery exclusive for Muslims.

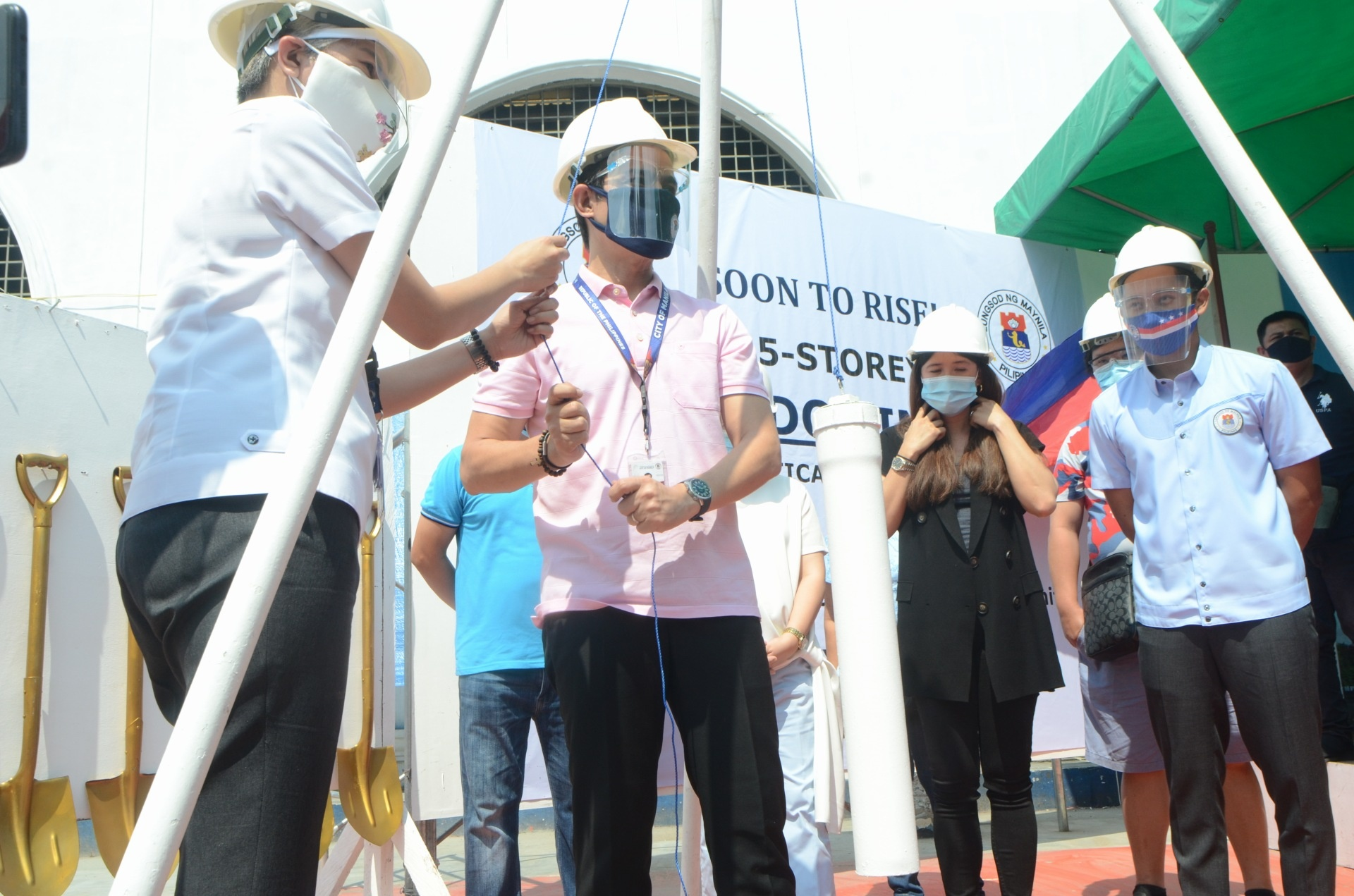
Moreno (second from left) and then-Vice Mayor Honey Lacuna (left) during the groundbreaking ceremony of the 15-story Binondominium

Public housing for the homeless and city employees was one of Moreno's campaign promises, and his administration oversaw the construction of high-rise, in-city, vertical housing projects such as Tondominium 1 and 2, and Binondominium. In July 2021, illegal settlers and tenants from Baseco Compound were awarded with horizontal townhouses in Manila's community housing project BaseCommunity. A second phase of BaseCommunity is planned.

In 2020, as an initiative to ease the economic effects of the COVID-19 pandemic after President Duterte declared the national government was running out of funds to provide aid, the city government of Manila headed by Moreno, sold a 3,701 m^{2} (39,840 sq ft) land where Divisoria Public Market is situated, a patrimonial property (Note: Article 422 of the Civil Code of the Philippines states "property of public dominion, when no longer intended for public use or for public service, shall form part of the patrimonial property of the State". Therefore, patrimonial assets refers to those that are not of public use, serve no public purpose, do not increase national wealth, or are declared by government to have no public value.) which is a part of the old Divisoria Mall, to private company Festina Holdings Inc. The decision was made after the recommendation of the city's Assets Management Committee, which was tasked with finding city assets that were "white elephants"—unused, underused or no-longer beneficial. Divisoria Public Market has not been managed by the city government since 1992 after former mayors handed over management of the land and the market to private company Linkworld Corporation. Aside from the low monthly earnings from the lease, the city government's income from the site had been declining because of non-paying stallholders. The city government said the decision was advantageous for the city since it earned more from the sale of the Divisoria market than the rent it has earned for more than 25 years, and that the sale price of ₱1.45 billion was higher than the Commission on Audit's valuation of the property at ₱173.136 per square meter. Further, the office of the city administrator said the city government would earn more funds from the real estate taxes that will be generated from land developers than the tenant fees collected by the vendors.

It was also agreed Festina Holdings will pay all required taxes after sales, including capital gains tax. Consultation and notices were given to stallholders, public documentation was widely circulated, and city council resolutions and public-bidding conferences were held; of three bidders, Festina won. Vendors would be temporarily transferred to Pritil Market. The city government assured to the vendors that they would not be removed and that rent should not increase as stated in the agreement made by the company and the city government. As of the 2022 elections, no vendors had been moved from their stalls. Payment obtained from the sale of Divisoria market was used for erecting Manila COVID-19 Field Hospital and 12 quarantine facilities, housing projects, procurement of antiviral medicines, and food packs for the city's 700,000 households. During the 2022 general election, almost two years after the sale was settled, the subject matter resurfaced after Manila mayoral candidate Alex Lopez, son of former mayor Mel Lopez, said its sale lacked transparency and threatened to press charges against Moreno and the city council. Moreno refuted Lopez's allegations as misleading and politically motivated, and said no violations were made as everything was done with due process and was well-documented. Moreno also said some of the vendors and representatives of Divisoria Public Market Credit Cooperative may have been manipulated by Lopez to spread black propaganda and sensationalize the issue for personal interests. Lopez lost in his mayoral bid to Moreno's ally Honey Lacuna in the 2022 Manila local elections.

On February 3, 2021, the city government of Manila, headed by Moreno, acquired a 6,003-square-meter (64,620 sq ft) private lot worth ₱111 million located at Pasig Line in San Andres through Ordinance No. 8115 (2006). The purchased land will be used for the "Land for the Landless" program of Manila Urban Settlements Office. The land acquisition is perceived to provide housing to more than 600 low-income informal settlers and homeless families.

From 2019 to 2020, government-owned banks Development Bank of the Philippines and Land Bank of the Philippines granted Moreno's request for financial loans for infrastructure projects after the assessment and approval of the Department of Budget and Management (DBM). The City of Manila had been denied loans by government-owned banks in the previous city administrations due to a reputation of being "not bankable". In 2019, Moreno reportedly inherited a zero budget from the previous administration. After presenting his infrastructure plans, the DBM's certification to prove the city's capability to pay, and the Supreme Court's Mandanas–Garcia ruling that entitles local government units to receive an additional budget allocation from both internal revenue taxes and national taxes starting in 2022, the government-owned banks became interested in the potential revenue of Moreno's infrastructures and the city once again became "bankable". The loans granted to Manila serve as an advance receipt of Manila's guaranteed Mandanas budget allotment, ensuring future full payment to the banks as well as the revenue that will be generated by the infrastructure assets. Moreno's 10-year infrastructure plan was apparently achieved in three years with the completion of his housing projects, new school buildings, new hospitals, and Manila's renovation and beautification programs. The city government was able to increase tax revenue collection each year from its infrastructure assets in 2019 to 2022 compared to the previous administrations, despite the pandemic, based on the Commission on Audit's annual reports prompting the city government not to impose additional taxes on Manila residents.

In March 2022, Moreno met with representatives of Elon Musk's SpaceX to negotiate a contract for the acquisition of Starlink's low Earth orbit satellite broadband internet system for the City of Manila. In May 2022, the National Telecommunications Commission approved Starlink Internet Services Philippines' registration as a value-added service provider, making the Philippines the first country in the ASEAN region to use Starlink's satellite and Manila the first city in Southeast Asia to acquire the service. The system is designed to provide broadband services to remote areas which will offer low latency internet services and when communications are disrupted during natural disasters. The city government of Manila plans to deploy the satellites to 896 barangays, several public schools, police stations, and hospitals.

==== COVID-19 pandemic response ====
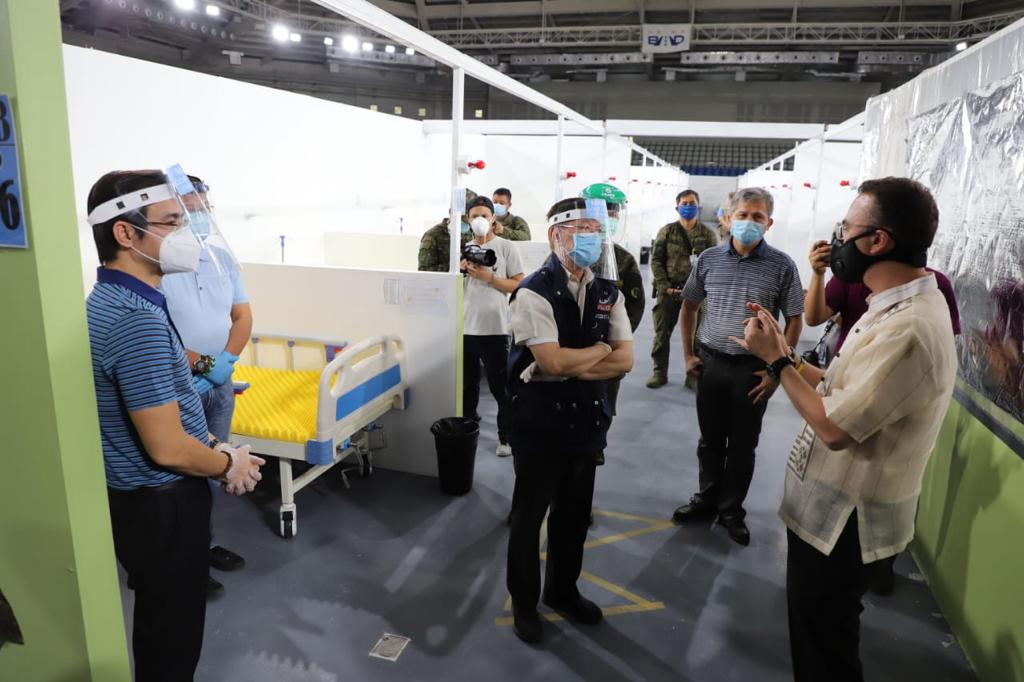
Moreno (far left), with then-Health Secretary Francisco Duque III (center) and then-House Speaker Alan Peter Cayetano (far right) during the Ninoy Aquino Stadium COVID-19 quarantine inspection

On March 10, 2020, the Government of the United Kingdom invited Moreno to attend sessions on proper COVID-19 response; he met with the UK's coronavirus task force officials in London. Upon returning to the Philippines, Moreno declared a state of calamity in the city on March 15, 2020, following a directive from Metro Manila Council, after the second and third COVID-19 cases were confirmed. From the same date, Moreno slept in his office for three months to oversee the city government's response to the COVID-19 pandemic.

On March 16, Manila Department of Social Welfare (MDSW) began rescuing homeless people, as well as people living outside the city who were unable to return home following the imposition of the Luzon-wide enhanced community quarantine. They took refuge at Delpan Sports Complex in San Nicolas (near Tondo). The city allocated ₱227.5 million (US$4.45 million) from its budget to assist families affected by the quarantine. On March 18, Moreno ordered all lodging facilities in Manila to provide free accommodations for front-line health workers such as doctors and nurses throughout the period of enhanced community quarantine. To financially help the city government employees, Moreno drafted a resolution ordering the release of their mid-year bonuses. Another resolution appropriating funds and giving cash assistance for the city's job order and contractualized workers was also enacted.

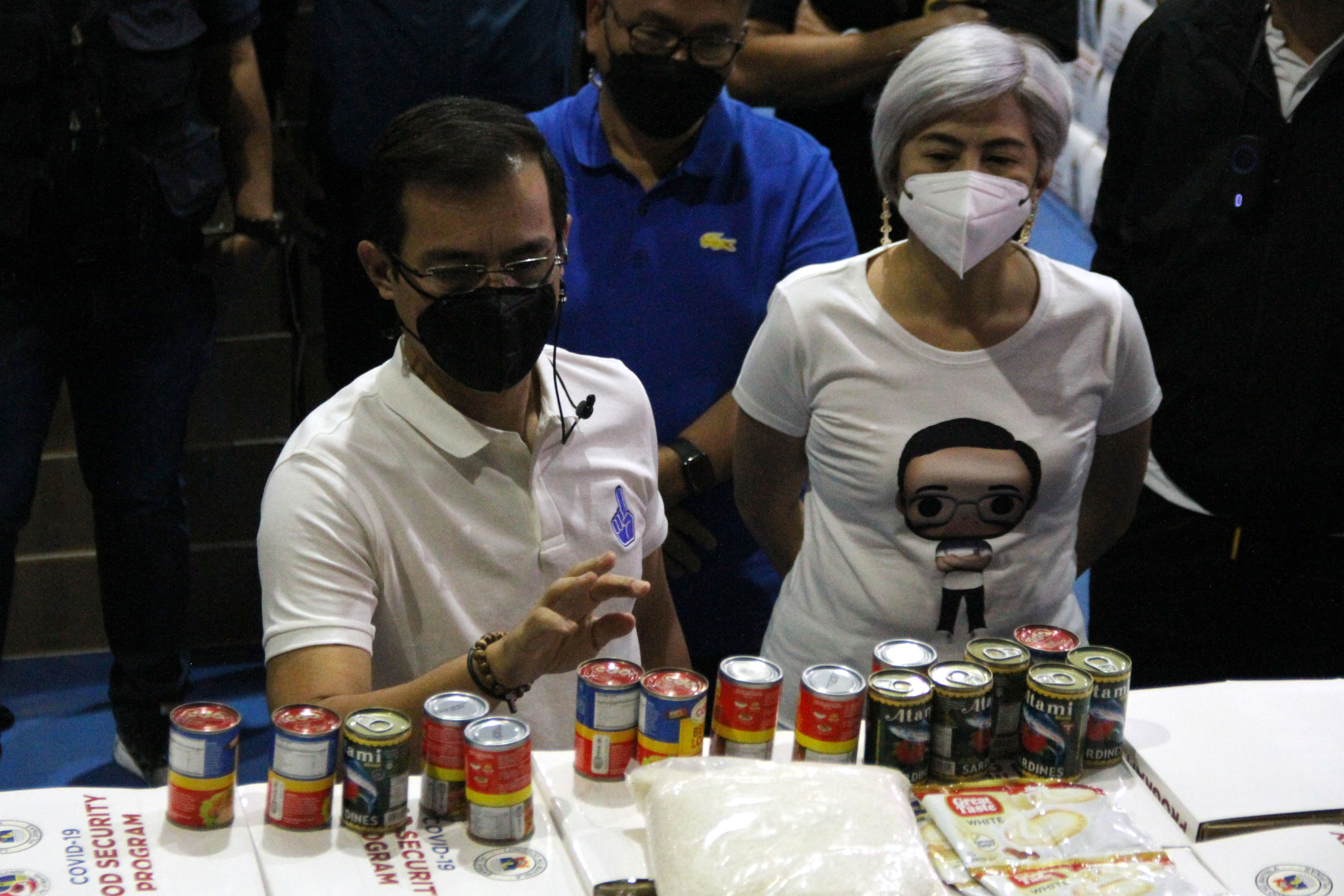
Moreno and then-Vice Mayor Honey Lacuna (right) inspecting the food packs to be distributed to over 700,000 families in Manila

On March 19, the city deployed 189 electric tricycles to exclusively transport front-line health workers to the city's public hospitals. Drivers of electric tricycles received salaries from the city government. The city also coordinated with the Department of Social Welfare and Development of the national government to source food supplies for the city's families. On April 5, Moreno signed an ordinance enacting the City Amelioration Crisis Assistance Fund (CACAF), allocating ₱591 million (US$12 million) for around 568,000 families and distributing ₱1,000 (US$19.73) to each household. A second tranche of money was given from May 20 to 21 for more than 680,000 families, some of whom did do not receive a payout from the first CACAF distribution.

On March 23, 2020, Moreno launched an online survey via his Facebook page asking Manila residents about their health status in relation to COVID-19 and their recent travel history.

On April 3, 2020, Manila City Council approved an ordinance penalizing discriminatory acts directed against coronavirus patients and other patients under evaluation, including discrimination by health workers on the basis of patients' medical conditions. The following day, Moreno ordered the temporary closure of Ospital ng Sampaloc after five hospital staff contracted the virus. On April 6, 2020, Moreno announced he and several other government officials in the city would donate their salaries to Philippine General Hospital to increase its financial capability amid the pandemic. The Manila city government partnered with the Department of Agriculture to launch the Kadiwa Rolling Store project, a mobile farmers' market that sold fresh products to residents during the closure of retail establishments due to the enhanced community quarantine. The first unit was deployed to Santa Ana on April 6, 2020.

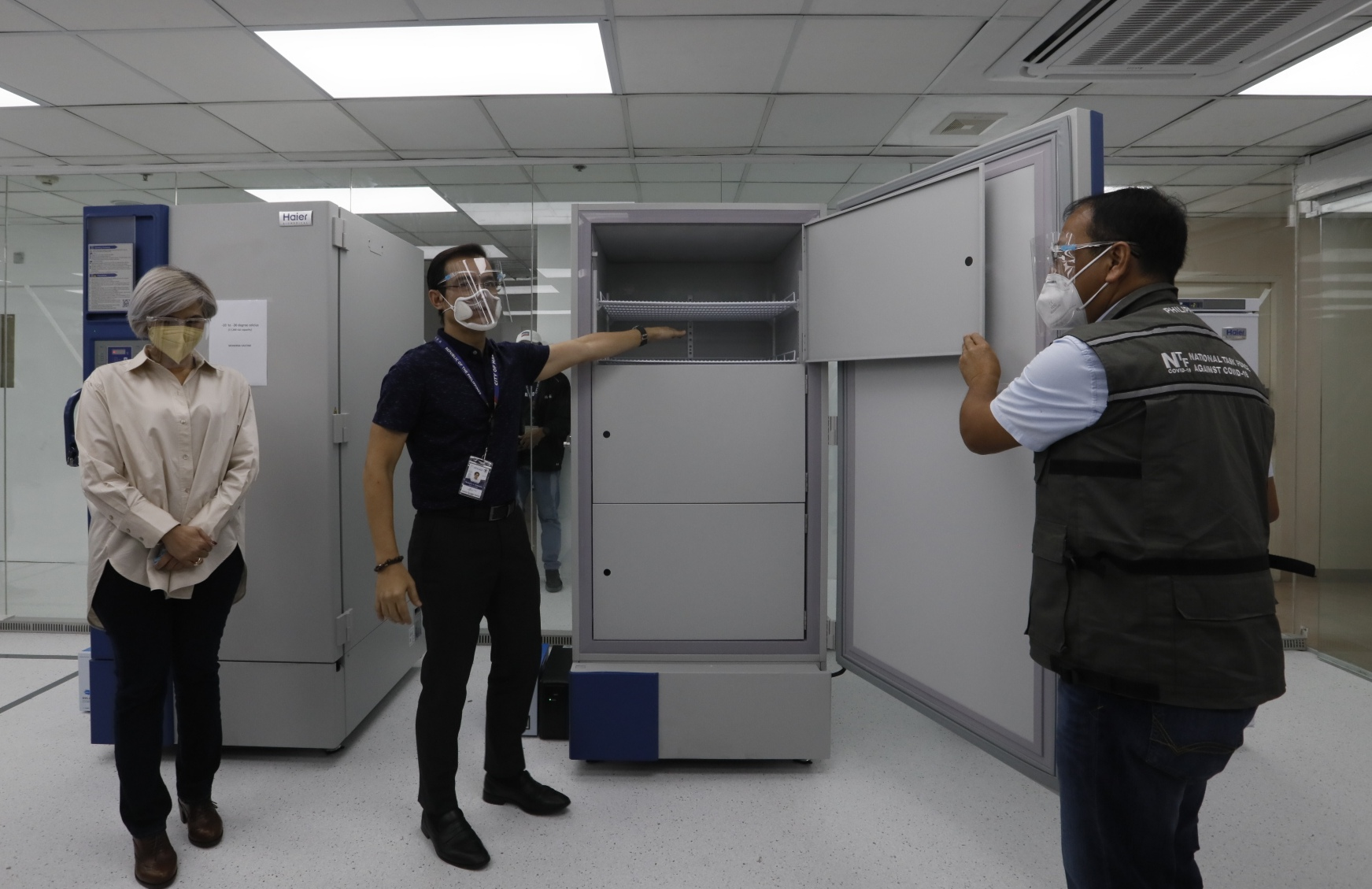
Moreno (center), together with then-National Task Force Against COVID-19 (NTF) chief implementer and vaccine czar Carlito Galvez Jr. (right), and then-Vice Mayor Honey Lacuna (left), during the visit of the officials of the Inter-Agency Task Force (IATF) and the NTF at the Santa Ana Hospital, Manila, inspecting its cold storage facility that can store up to 900,000 COVID-19 vaccines at a time

On July 15, 2020, Moreno launched the city's drive-through testing facility, where passengers in vehicles could undergo free COVID-19 testing near Bonifacio Shrine in Ermita. The facility was open to both residents and non-residents of the city, and was the first testing facility of its kind in the country. Three days later, the city government opened a second drive-through testing facility at the Quirino Grandstand.

The city government also built Manila COVID-19 Field Hospital in Rizal Park in 52 days, which began admitting patients on June 25, 2021. Moreno thanked the 362 construction workers who built the facility. Manila residents were given cash aid from the national government despite a brief dispute between Moreno and President Duterte; Moreno thanked Duterte for pushing through the aid.

Manila became the first local government unit in the country to procure anti-COVID-19 medicines such as Molnupiravir, Remdesivir, Tocilizumab, Baricitinib, and Bexovid for aged 12 and above, all of which prevents mild to moderate cases from progressing into severe diseases. Moreno said the drugs were also available to non-city residents. In October 2020, the city government of Manila was cited for and received an award from the Department of Health (DOH) for its COVID-19 response. Moreno thanked the city's six district hospitals and Manila Health Department for their service during the pandemic. The DOH also recognized Moreno for the city achieving a 143% accomplishment rate of its child-vaccination program.

Manila was the only city in the National Capital Region that was not placed under COVID-19 Alert Level 4. Manila was later included in 34th place in Time Out's list of 53 world's best cities, praising its "aggressive COVID-19 response which helped the city stay afloat". Manila was also voted the third-most-resilient city in the same survey. On July 14, 2022, the 12th City Council of Manila honored former Mayor Moreno "for his vibrant leadership that resulted to the City of Manila placing 34th in the Time Out's list of best cities in the world".

==== Cleanup drive ====
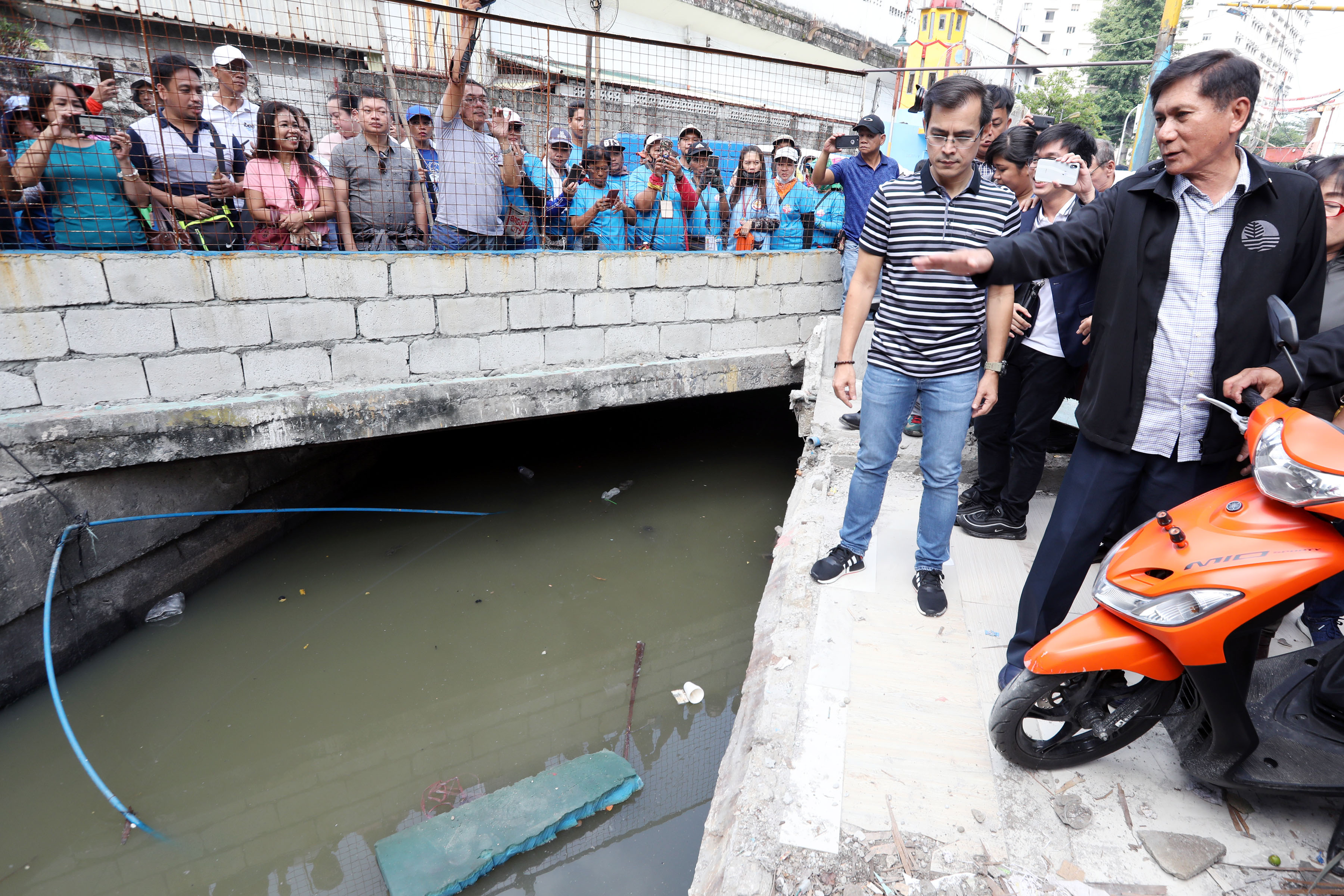
Moreno with then-Department of Environment and Natural Resources (DENR) Secretary Roy Cimatu (far right) inspecting the different waterways in Estero de San Antonio Abad of Barangay 718, Malate, Manila that lead to the Manila Bay

Moreno oversaw the cleaning of congested streets of Manila. He ordered the clearing of informal vendors to address the city's congestion problem and waste management, leading to the stopping of extortion of vendors and the exposure of derelict heritage sites within the city.

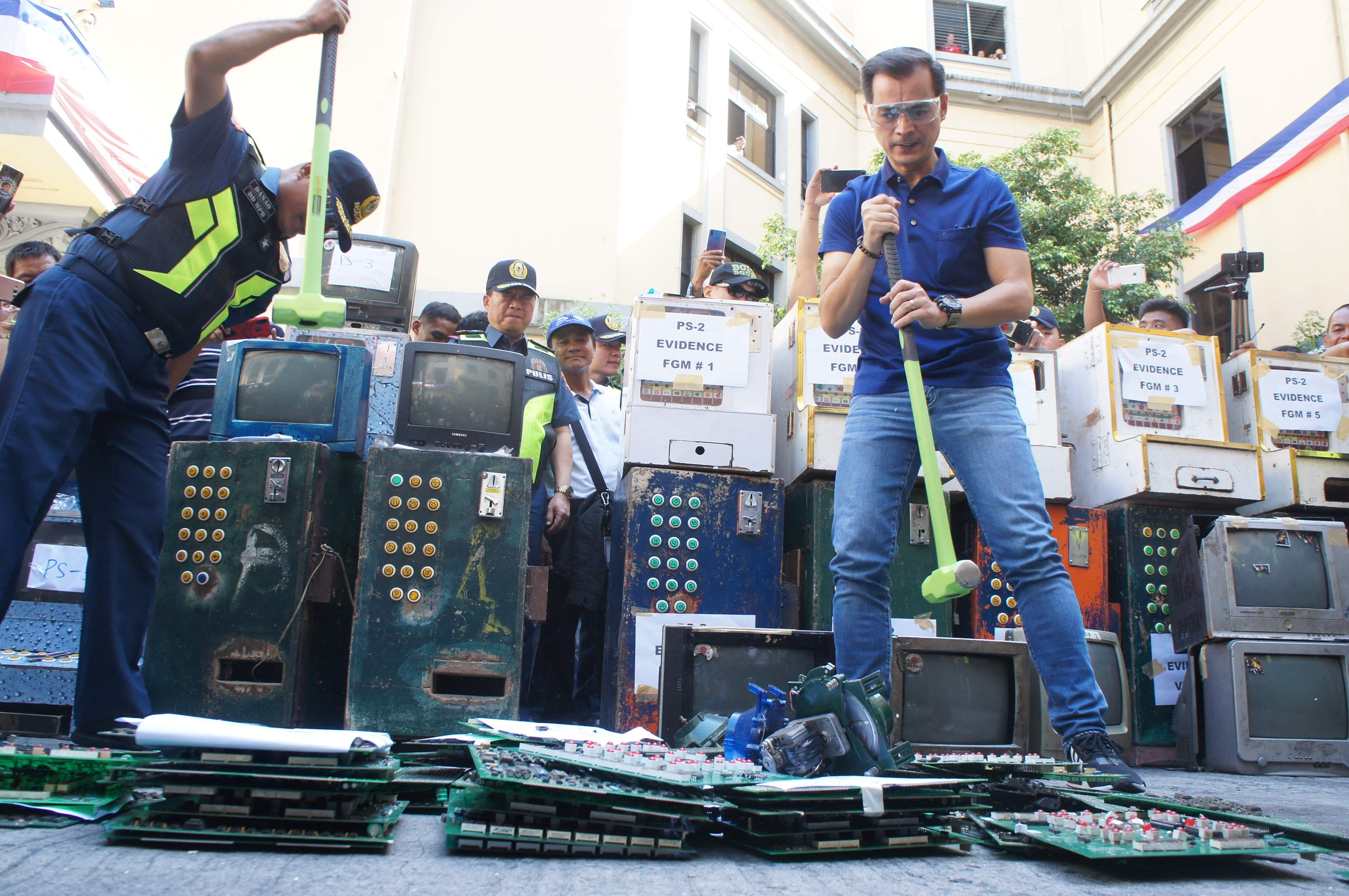
Moreno (right) and then-Manila Police District director, Vicente Danao (left) leading the destruction of confiscated illegal video karera (online gambling game) machines

Moreno ordered the demolition of illegally built structures, including government edifices, that impeded the movement of motorists and pedestrians. His cleanup drive of Manila North Cemetery after All Souls' Day garnered attention online and spurred a nationwide implementation of the same approach to city decongestion.

President Rodrigo Duterte echoed Moreno's initiative, ordering the Department of the Interior and Local Government (DILG) to "reclaim all public roads that are being used for private ends". On October 8, 2019, Moreno signed Executive Order No. 43 mandating all 896 barangays and frontline City Hall offices to conduct a weekly clean-up drive in support of Duterte's directive to clear all public roads and sidewalks of obstructions.

Moreno also ordered the cleaning of Manila's sewers and the removal of dilapidated barges from the Pasig River. He also ordered the cleanup of waters around Baseco Compound, which took 10 days, including weekends, during which more than 30,000 kilograms (66,000 lb) of garbage was collected. Under Moreno's "May Pera Sa Basura" program, the city government launched the community-based "Kolek, Kilo, Kita para Walastik na Maynila" waste-collection program in partnership with private firms and the Pasig River Rehabilitation Commission (PRRC). The program was incentivized, aiming to encourage residents to cooperate with the government to reduce the pollution of the Pasig River. For every 1 kilogram (2.2 lb) of plastic wastes collected, Unilever Philippines would exchange ₱10 worth of homecare products.

==== 2022 presidential campaign ====
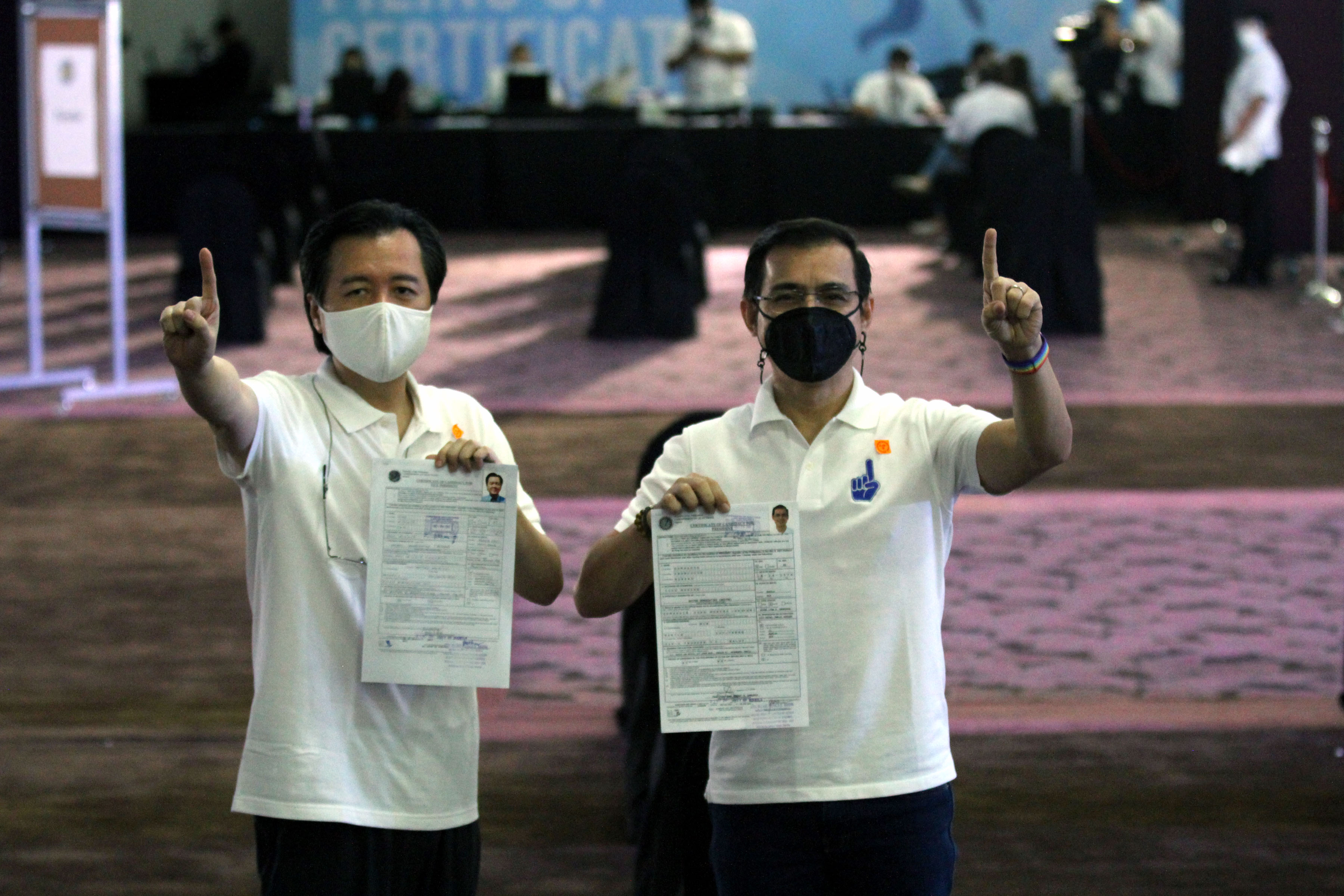
Moreno (right) and Dr. Willie Ong filing their Certificates of Candidacy for president and vice president respectively

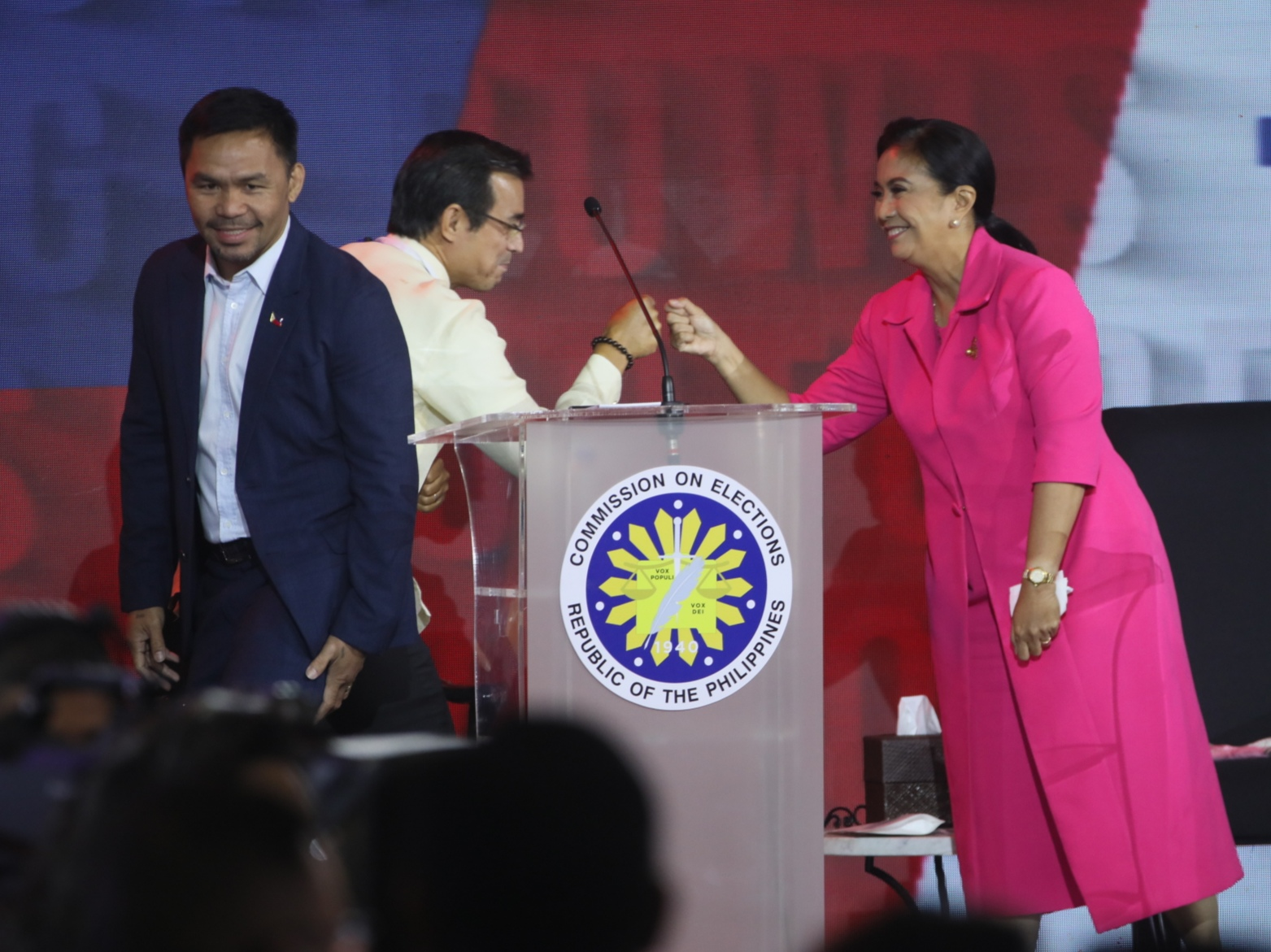
Moreno (center) with fellow presidential aspirants Leni Robredo (right) and Manny Pacquiao (left) during the closing moments of the 2nd PiliPinas Debates 2022

On August 4, 2021, Moreno resigned his membership of the National Unity Party and from his post as the party's Vice Chairman for Political Affairs to join Aksyon Demokratiko, and on August 12, he was elected as the party's president. On September 22, 2021, Moreno declared himself a candidate for President of the Philippines in the 2022 election, with physician and social-media personality Willie Ong serving as his vice presidential running mate. Following the announcement, Ong left the Lakas-CMD party to join Moreno's Aksyon Demokratiko.

In December 2021, Moreno said he intended to retire in politics if he was not elected as president, and that he would rather spend quality time with his family. During Moreno's presidential campaign, he attacked mostly Vice President Leni Robredo and her camp, beginning in October 2021 and intensifying a week before the 2022 elections. When polls showed that Moreno was trailing behind Robredo, Moreno held a press conference attacking not the frontrunner Marcos, but Robredo again. Moreno called for Robredo to drop from the race in favor of his presidential ambitions.

Moreno was not elected president; he finished fourth out of ten candidates, and former senator Bongbong Marcos was elected to the post. Moreno garnered 1,933,909 votes and conceded the election. External observers attribute the failure of his campaign to his lack of political machinery, alleged infighting within his campaign team, disinformation against him, and minimal media coverage. An April 17 joint press conference, at which Moreno criticised presidential candidate Leni Robredo, was also said to work against his campaign. According to his Statement of Contributions and Expenses (SOCE), Moreno had no excess campaign contributions and donations, and spent an extra ₱1.1 million from his personal funds for the campaign.

== Political hiatus (2022–2024) ==
During his first retirement from politics, Moreno debuted his new weekly web talk show, Iskovery Night, in January 2023 under his new venture, Scott Media Productions, based in the Bonifacio Global City in Taguig. His first guest was actor Coco Martin. Some of Moreno's staff were former employees of ABS-CBN who were retrenched due to the non-renewal of its franchise.

In June 2023, Moreno joined the noontime variety show Eat Bulaga! (later Tahanang Pinakamasaya) on GMA Network as one of its new hosts, following the departure of the original cast. On July 8, he signed a long-term contract with TAPE Inc., as the rumors about the show's cancellation were debunked. On July 20, Moreno returned to his home station, GMA Network, by signing an exclusive contract with its talent agency, Sparkle. Tahanang Pinakamasaya was later cancelled in March 2024.

In February 2024, Moreno opened his restaurant, Ugbo, located in McKinley Hill, Taguig.

Moreno served as a guest host in the pre-noontime show TiktoClock in May 2024, also broadcast by GMA Network.

== Return to politics ==
=== Second term as Mayor of Manila (2025–present) ===
Yorme's Choice logo

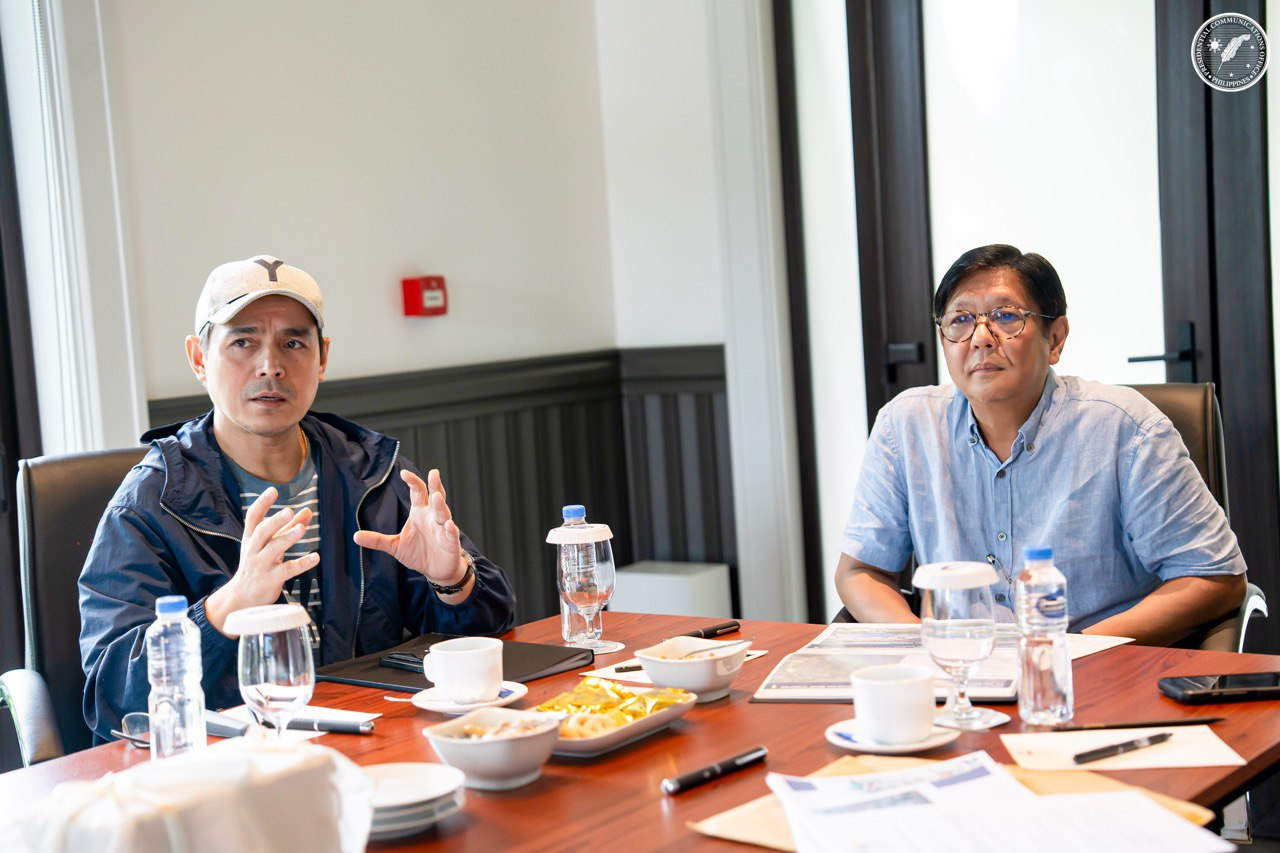
Moreno with President Bongbong Marcos in 2025

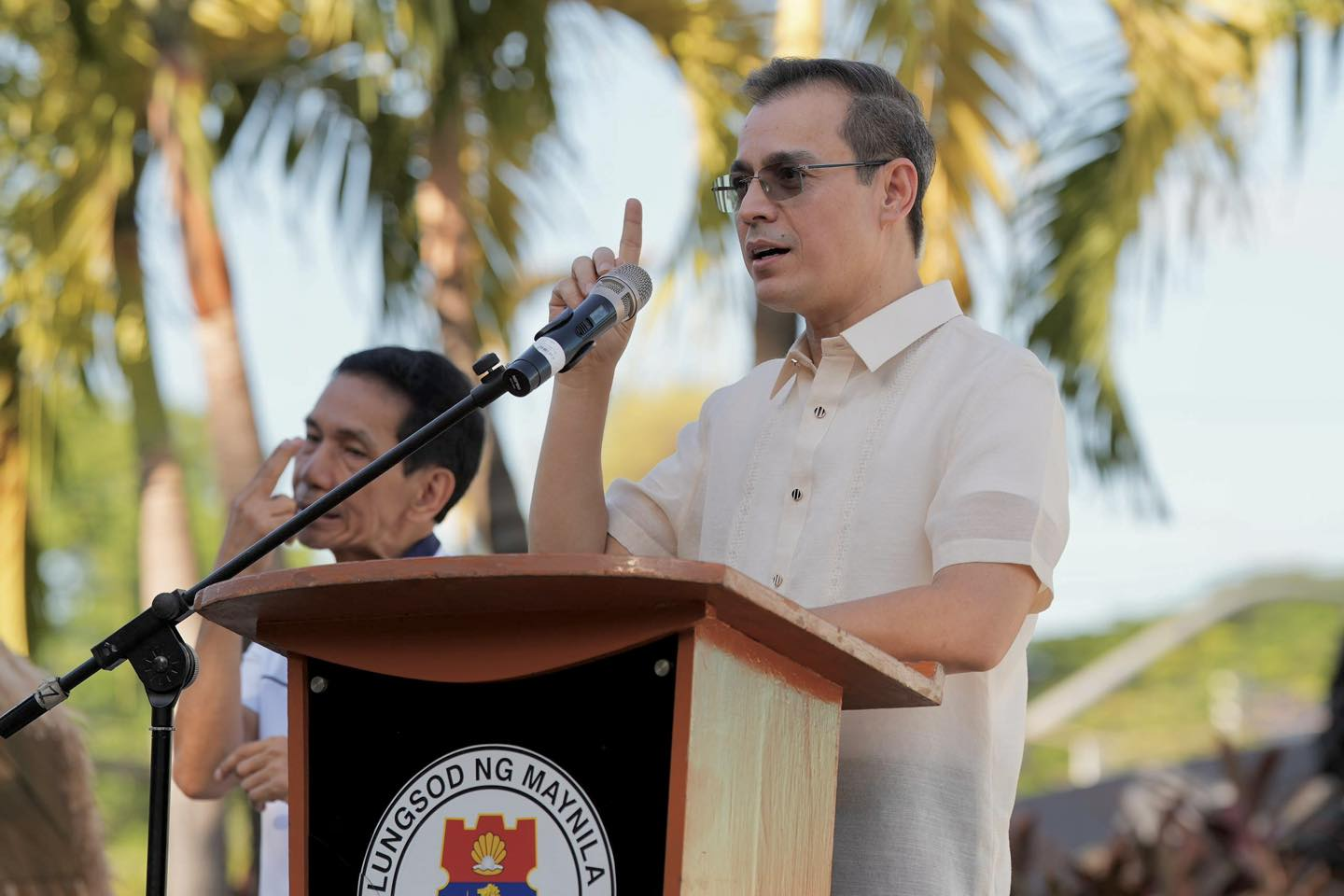
Moreno during a flag-raising ceremony at the Bonifacio Shrine in May 2026

Despite the absence of official announcements about his political plans, Moreno had a high probability of winning a Senate seat in the 2025 midterm polls, according to a commissioned survey conducted by Pulse Asia from March 6 to 10, 2024. Moreno, who unsuccessfully ran for president in 2022, tied with incumbent senators Ronald dela Rosa and Imee Marcos with a rank of 6–13.

Moreno, who initially denied plans to run for any position, would come out of political retirement and announced another run for mayor of Manila. He formed a ticket under Aksyon, named "Yorme's Choice," with him as the standard bearer for the 2025 elections, and with Chi Atienza as his vice mayoralty running mate. He effectively left Asenso Manileño and challenged Lacuna, Tutok To Win Party-List Representative Sam Verzosa, and fellow actor Raymond Bagatsing, among others. Moreno officially filed his certificate of candidacy on October 8, 2024 which was the last day of filing for the 2025 elections as stipulated by the Commission on Elections (COMELEC). His campaign slogans of "Make Manila Great Again" and "Let's Make Manila Great Again" were inspired by the campaign slogans of U.S. Presidents Ronald Reagan and Donald Trump.

On April 22 and 24, 2025, the COMELEC anti-vote buying committee issued show cause orders against Moreno, fellow mayoral candidate Sam Verzosa, and other local candidates over alleged vote-buying activities surrounding their campaign.

Moreno later regained the mayoralty through a landslide victory following the May 12, 2025 elections, garnering 59.02% of the votes. On May 19, 2025, he took his oath of office before Associate Justice Antonio Kho Jr., ahead of the start of his term on June 30, 2025. He became the first mayor to serve nonconsecutive terms since Alfredo Lim.

On his first day back as mayor, Moreno announced his intention to declare a state of health emergency amidst the ongoing garbage crisis in the city. To stabilize the situation, Moreno reinstated long-time contractor Leonel Waste Management, but the move sparked controversy in early 2026. Public outcry intensified following a 1,200% hike in garbage collection fees for businesses in Manila by virtue of Ordinance No. 9151 and the circulation of photos showing Moreno on leisure trips with Leonel's owner, leading to allegations of cronyism, mismanagement, and conflict of interest. Beyond waste management, Moreno's second term focused on rapid-response infrastructure, weekly barangay clean-up, and fiscal recovery. His administration also reported settling ₱4.8 billion in prior-year city debts by 2026, funded in part by a general tax amnesty program.

On December 1, 2025, Leilani Lacuna, barangay chairwoman of Barangay 609 in Santa Mesa and sister of former mayor Honey Lacuna, filed graft and usurpation of authority complaints with the Ombudsman against Moreno, Vice Mayor Chi Atienza and 13 other officials, alleging her illegal ouster as Liga ng mga Barangay President via an "intimidatory" snap election on November 10. Lacuna termed the move a "political vendetta" to control barangay budgets, while the city government defended the transition as a democratic mandate supported by 844 out of 896 barangay chairpersons in Manila.

== Political positions ==
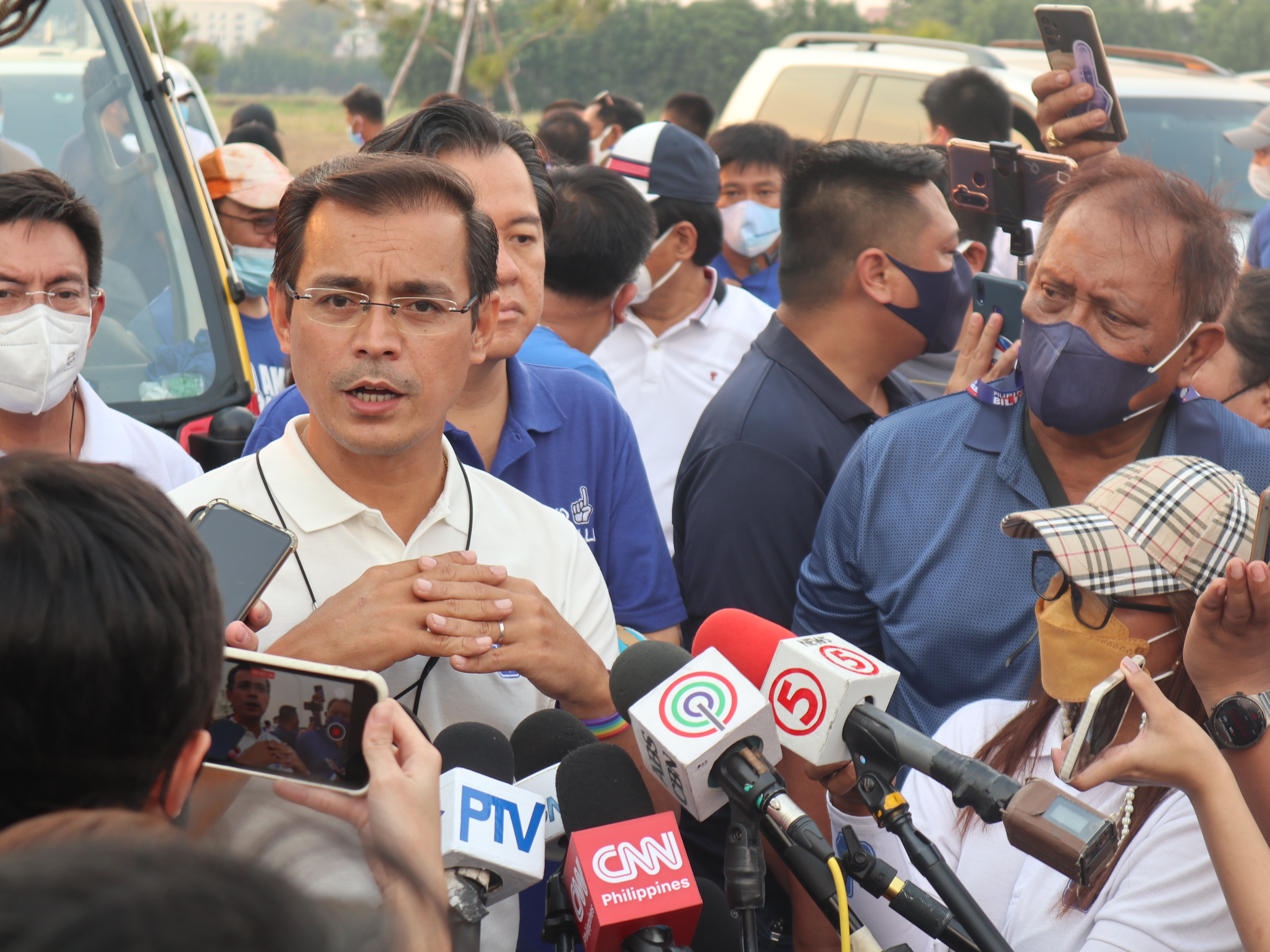
Moreno during a media interview in 2022

During his 2022 presidential campaign, Moreno was identified as a populist; some of his views on issues include speeding the nationwide distribution of COVID-19 vaccines; maintaining the Duterte administration's "Build! Build! Build!" program"; allowing the franchise renewal of ABS-CBN; lowering excise tax on fuel and utility costs, reviving micro, small, and medium-sized enterprises (MSME), which were severely affected by COVID-19 lockdowns; increasing labor and employment; additional public housing; boosting development of agriculture, tourism, and creative industries; strengthening of policies in healthcare and education; infrastructure development in rural areas; developing of economic hubs outside Metro Manila; digital transformation and industry 4.0; strengthening of law and order; continuing the Duterte administration's anti-drug policy in a "more humane approach"; good and smart electronic governance; maintaining peaceful relations with other countries and international organisations; and ending divisive politics in favor of an "open governance" rooted in "competence" over "connections".

=== Domestic and social policies ===
==== Vandalism and unauthorised tarpaulins ====
Moreno is also known for his consistent and controversial stand against vandalism and unauthorised tarpaulins.

On November 12, 2019, the left-leaning group Panday Sining, the cultural arm of Anakbayan, defaced the newly painted and cleaned Lagusnilad Underpass near the Manila City Hall. Moreno publicly criticised the group and rejected their apology. Moreno proceeded with the group's arrest after another act of vandalism in Recto LRT Station was attributed to them. Panday Sining was officially declared persona non grata in the city of Manila on December 6, 2019. Many left-leaning groups condemned the mayor's actions against them.

In October 2020, Moreno ordered the removal of tarpaulins declaring the Communist Party of the Philippines, the New People's Army, and the National Democratic Front persona non grata in the National Capital Region. This event prompted Lt. Gen. Antonio Parlade Jr., spokesperson of the National Task Force to End Local Communist Armed Conflict, to ask whether Moreno was welcoming terrorists into Manila. Moreno responded the city government has an ordinance against all forms of vandalism. A few days after, Moreno publicly condemned and ordered the removal of graffiti painted by leftist advocates around Welcome Rotonda. On December 7, 2020, in an interview posted on YouTube, Moreno vehemently denied he had any support for or affiliation with the terrorist groups. Moreno also opposed tarpaulins depicting faces of politicians, even if they are his partymates, and had ordered the removal of political tarpaulins since he assumed office.

==== LGBT+ rights ====
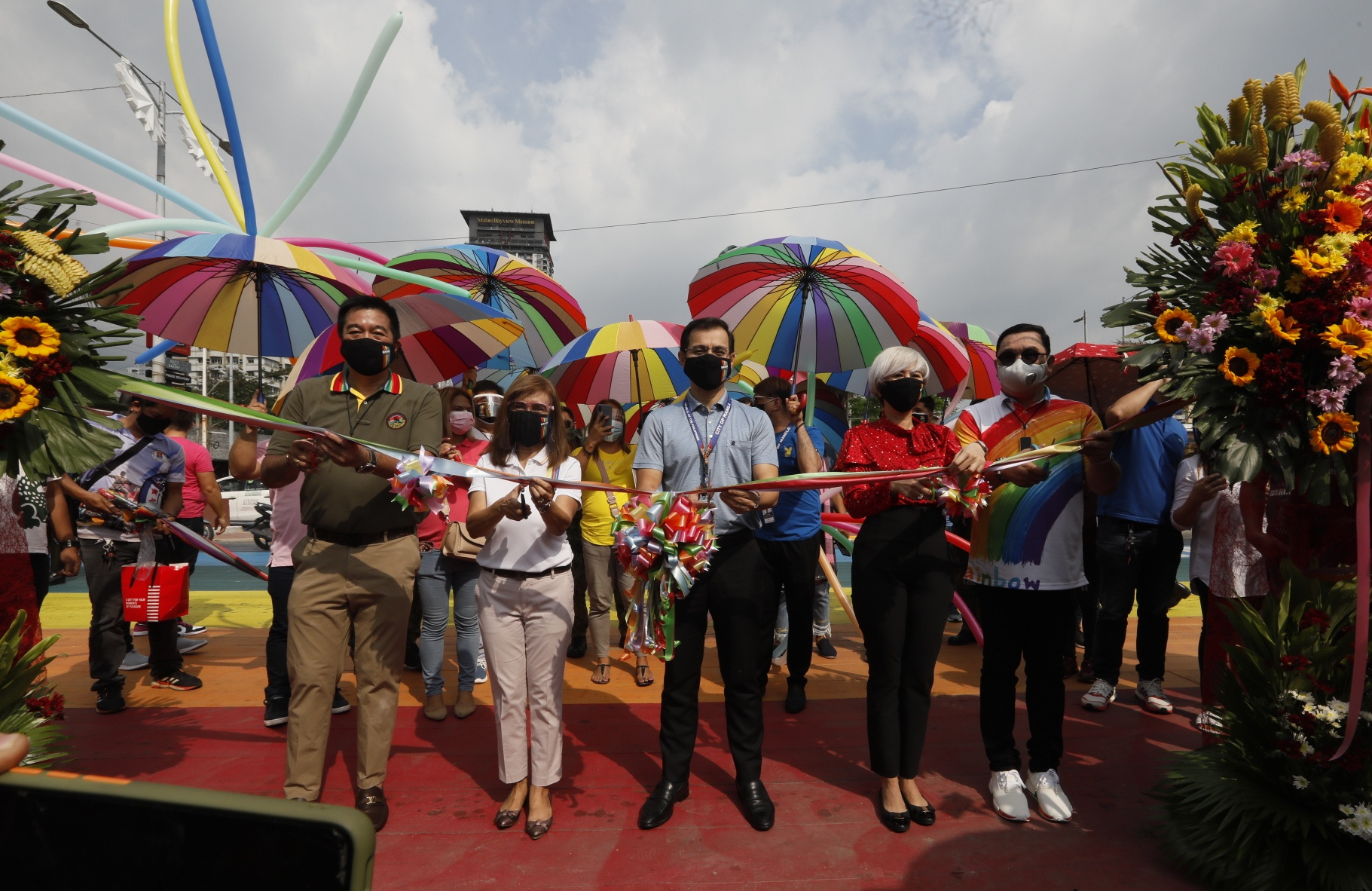
Moreno (third from right) and then-Vice Mayor Honey Lacuna (second from right) during the inauguration of the rainbow crossing in front of the Plaza Rajah Sulayman along Roxas Boulevard

In October 2020, Moreno signed Ordinance No. 8695 protecting members of the LGBT community from all forms of discrimination and abuse, including the denial of employment and other opportunities on the basis of the person's sexual orientation, gender identity, and expression. As part of its campaign against discrimination, the Manila city government mandated all establishments to have gender-neutral toilets by 2023, and they would be a requirement for the approval and renewal of business permits.

In an interview, Moreno said he is not in favor of same-sex marriage, adding: "it is our law and in a civilized world, we are guided by the law". However, Moreno supports same-sex civil unions.

==== Women's rights ====
In November 2020, Moreno signed into law Ordinance No. 8681 known as the "Gender and Development Code of the City of Manila" or the "GAD Code" which increases maternity leave for breastfeeding women working in the private sector, increased paternity leave for new fathers, and increased women's reproductive health benefits. The ordinance also protects women and those of other genders against sexual abuse, violence, trafficking, gender discrimination, pedophilia, commercial exploitation, and sexual harassment. The policy also provides support for victims of violence such as immediate investigations, free medical services and counseling, and the creation of support groups and community-based psychological programs. The ordinance also said one third of jobs in the city development council for gender and development, and in the barangay, should be reserved for women "in recognition of their considerable leadership and involvement".

Moreno has praised the country's female medical and health workers, as well as women front-line workers in other fields, acknowledging their roles as "critical and crucial as much as their male counterparts" in the country's response against COVID-19. He also lauded the mothers who leave their families to fulfill their duties as front-line staff. Moreno also recognized the efforts of his vice mayor Honey Lacuna, Manila's first-ever elected female vice mayor, calling her an "effective leader who has taken solid steps in gender equality and women empowerment", and described her as like an older sister to him. He gave Lacuna executive functions on a par with his mayoral duties. During Moreno's term as mayor, women comprised almost half of City Hall's employees.

=== Foreign policy ===
Moreno expressed strong opinions on a foreign policy aligned with what he called a "Filipino-first" policy, under which the Philippines would form contracts, organisations, and trade agreements, only if they are beneficial to Filipinos.

According to Moreno, the Philippines is not "militarily prepared" for an encounter with China, and that laws such as the Law of the Sea must be upheld. He said he believes the country's defense secretary should come from the navy because the Philippines is an archipelagic country. He said the Philippines' should be "fearless" in asserting the country's claims to South China Sea islands, and should be responsive to the plight of Filipino fishermen, while it should be "fair" and "sensible" in dealing with other countries also occupying some maritime features in the sea, especially in trade. Moreno criticised the United Nations (UN), questioning what they are doing in light of China's disregard of the Permanent Court of Arbitration (PCA). According to Moreno, China needs to accept a 2016 arbitration award of the Hague ruling that made clear the Philippines' entitlements, including where it can fish and exploit offshore oil and gas, also citing the Velarde map as reference. He also expressed a wish to form partnerships with other countries and to prepare the Philippines for joint trade with China.

Moreno expressed support for the Philippines returning to the International Criminal Court (ICC) if the move would "give a good impression to the world".

== Public image ==
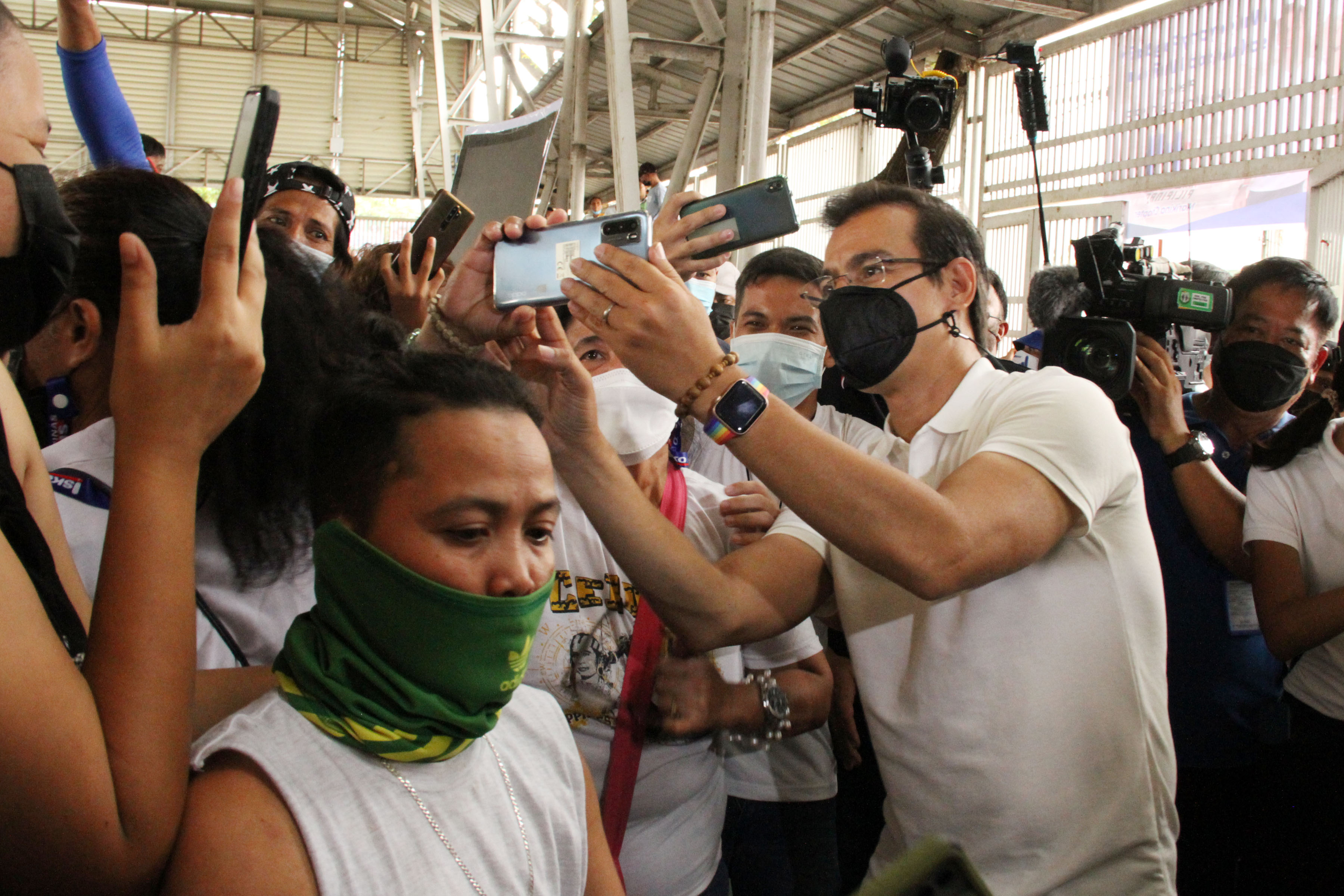
Moreno taking a selfie with his supporters

Isko Moreno has been described as a populist who has a "rags-to-riches" story, rising from his childhood as a slum-dwelling scavenger to become a celebrity and later entering politics. Moreno is also known for his streetwise image and his frequent use of Manila street slang, even in media interviews, to engage the masses—especially young adults—earning him the alias "Yorme" when he assumed office as city mayor in 2019. His supporters call Moreno's use of colorful language "ISKOnaryo", portmanteau of Isko and Diksiyonaryo (dictionary). He is also known for his signature dance steps to the song (Dying Inside) To Hold You by Timmy Thomas, a dance he frequently performed during his early show-business career. Moreno's popularity on social media has been attributed to his celebrity status, charisma, and commoner humor. Although his social media presence is well-received, as shown by its massive statistical growth in interactions, a number of critics describe such endeavor as pa-epal (attention-seeker) and "too showbiz". Moreno defended his constant social media updates as part of his "engagement" as mayor, and said "taking selfies" with supporters and granting photo-opportunities are also part of public service. Moreno was voted as one of the top-performing mayors in the National Capital Region in opinion polls during his tenure as Manila city mayor.

Moreno's remarks against the country's elite positioned him as a "man of the people". Moreno developed a reputation as an "underdog" politician who does not retreat from political giants, elitists, and moralists. Moreno has often been criticised for his "brash" style of talking but he dismisses this as his "real talk style" of addressing his constituents to which the elite could not relate. Moreno also positioned himself as a "politician of the ordinary people", though he was criticised for overusing his rags-to-riches narrative to the point it became clichéd. He has been widely compared to 16th president Rodrigo Duterte; critics labeled him "Duterte Lite" or "Duterte 2.0", and accused him of fence-sitting on some issues pertaining to Duterte.

Members of Moreno's inner circle have described his work ethic as "proactive" and "workaholic", and his leadership style as "obsessive". His colleagues, supporters, and external observers describe him as a "visionary", "transformative", and "brilliant".

=== Philanthropy ===
Since 2019, Moreno has donated about ₱100 million of his personal fees from product endorsements to charities; these include Philippine General Hospital, cancer-stricken children, and child liver-transplant patients, and to provinces including Batangas, Cotabato, and Cebu City, which have been hit by natural disasters.

== Personal life ==
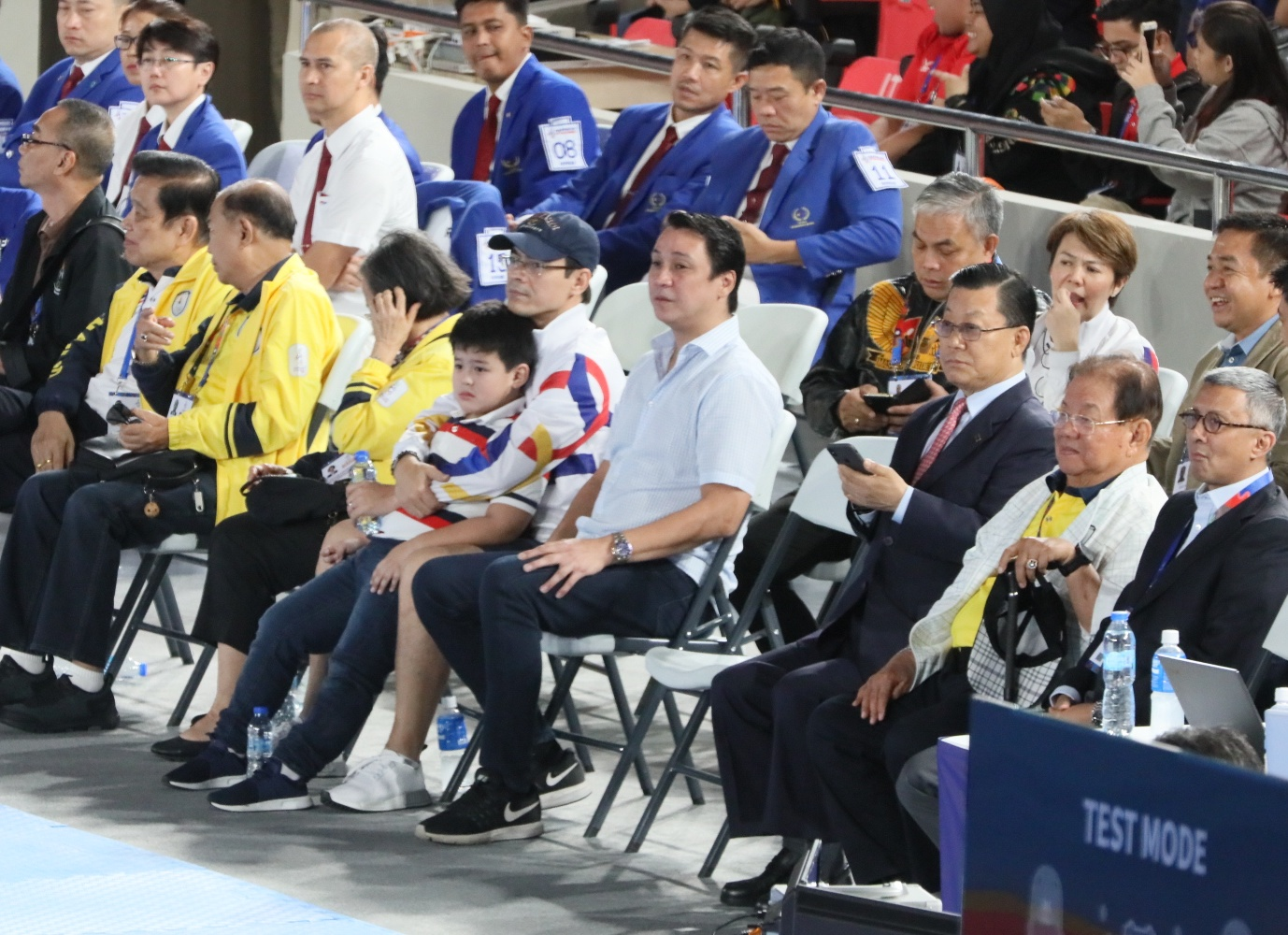
Moreno watching a taekwondo match in the 30th Southeast Asian Games with his youngest son Drake

Since 2000, Moreno has been married to Diana Lynn "Dynee" Ditan (born 1976), a businesswoman and a former taekwondo athlete with the Philippine national team. They have five children, including actor and councilor Joaquin Andre ("JD") (born 2001). Other children are Vincent Patrick (born 1997)—Ditan's son from a previous relationship who Moreno adopted, Frances Diane (born 1999), Franco Dylan (born 2009), and Drake Marcus (born 2011). In 2022, Moreno became a grandfather at age 47 with his son Joaquin.

During his early days as councilor of Manila, Moreno said he was once a chaperone to Japanese VIPs in casinos for public-relations purposes. He said although he used to play in casinos whenever he accompanied the Japanese, he denied he gambled whenever he was there, and that he had a gambling addiction. When Memorandum Circular No. 6, series of 2016 of the Presidential Decree No. 1869—which prohibits government officials and employees from gambling in casinos—Moreno said he no longer attends casinos, especially when he started serving as mayor.

On August 15, 2021, Moreno tested positive for COVID-19, from which he had recovered by August 25 the same year. Consequently, he has since used Iqos as an alternative to cigarette smoking. Moreno drinks occasionally.

Moreno is an honorary member of Alpha Kappa Rho and a member of the Davao Durian Eagles Club of the Fraternal Order of Eagles – Philippine Eagles. Moreno supports legitimate multi-level network marketing. Aside from his native Tagalog, Moreno can speak English in a professional working proficiency level. Moreno is a practicing Catholic.

Moreno cites Lee Kuan Yew, Abraham Lincoln, Martin Luther King Jr., and Ferdinand Marcos's approach to infrastructure projects as his inspirations in the field of governance.

Moreno's life and works have been featured in books; 'God First' Why Isko Moreno: I'M Doing It (Isko Moreno), which was written by Rick A. Conchada and published in November 2019, discusses Moreno's work as Manila's mayor. A children's book entitled Yorme! The Life Story of Isko Moreno (2021) was written by Yvette Fernandez and illustrated by Ray Sunga; it became one of the best-selling books at National Book Store.

== Awards, honors, and recognition ==
=== During mayoral term ===
Under Moreno's administration, the local government of the City of Manila won its first-ever Good Financial Housekeeping recognition from the Department of the Interior and Local Government (DILG) for 2019.

In a December-2020 year-end survey conducted by research group RP-Mission and Development (RPMD) Foundation Inc., Moreno had a 77% approval rating from the city's residents, becoming the third top-performing mayor in the National Capital Region after Joy Belmonte of Quezon City with 85% and Vico Sotto of Pasig with 82%. In another survey conducted by RPMD in September 2021, Moreno was ranked the top-performing mayor in the National Capital Region with an 88% approval rating. He was followed by Belmonte with 82% and Sotto with 81%.

The City of Manila was included in the top 50 finalists of the Bloomberg Philanthropies 2021 Global Mayors Challenge, a competition that aims to identify and implement the most-innovative ideas developed by cities to address the COVID-19 pandemic. Manila and the city of Butuan in Mindanao were the only Southeast Asian cities to appear on the list, which was selected from a pool of 631 cities that applied that year.

On October 29, 2021, the local government unit (LGU) of Manila, under Moreno's administration, won three awards during the Digital Governance Awards 2021 (LGUs Best Practices in Information and Communication Technology) by the Department of Information and Communications Technology (DICT). The awards include the COVID-19 Testing Center "Web-Lab-IS" – Best in LGU Empowerment Award (city level) at 1st Place, the City of Manila "Connection for Inclusion" Award – Best in Customer Empowerment Award (city level) at 1st Place, and the Business Permit Licensing Service (BPLS) – Best in Business Empowerment Award for its GO Manila App end-to-end solution (city level) at 2nd Place. The GO Manila App, which was launched in 2014, was improved to provide residents access to an online one-stop-shop giving LGU system automation and e-Services. Moreno planned the app to "help make transactions more convenient, transparent, and limit human discretion".

In June 2022, the City of Manila was awarded the Gawad Edukampyon for Learning Continuity Innovation Award in the highly urbanized city category by the Department of Education (DepEd), Department of the Interior and Local Government (DILG), the Center for Local Governance and Professional Development Inc., the Early Childhood Care and Development (ECCD) Council, and REX Publication during the first Gawad Edukampyon for Local Governance Awarding Ceremony in recognition of Manila's educational programs amid the COVID-19 pandemic under Moreno's administration. The award highlighted Manila's Continuity Education Plan called Connection for Inclusion 2.0, which focused on integrating information and communications technology (ICT) in schools.

=== Public service ===
Moreno was listed in a list of "Top 10 Men Who Matter in 2011" by PeopleAsia Magazine. He also received the "2012 Most Outstanding Filipino in the Field of Public Service Award" by Gawad Amerika Foundation.

The Asia Leaders Awards of 2019 and 2020 chose Moreno as "Man of the Year in Public Service". In November 2019, Moreno won the 2019 Gusi Peace Prize in recognition for his work in "consistently creating positive changes" during his time as vice mayor and councilor. The same month, Esquire Philippines gave Moreno the "Breakthrough Award" for his "distinguished track records in public service, leadership, and governance" during their Man At His Best 2019 Honors night given to outstanding men and women in the fields of art, film, fashion, sports, business, and public service. Moreno was also chosen as "The Management Man of the Year" awardee for 2019–2020 by the Philippine Council of Management (Philcoman).

In November 2019, the Harvard Business School Owner/President Management (HBS OPM) Club of the Philippines, a club composed of Harvard graduates in the Philippines, honored Moreno as its first-ever awardee for being a "Gamechanger in Politics" and recognized his "outstanding leadership" and "dedicated public service". He was also conferred with honorary membership in the club.

Moreno was listed as one of the "Men Who Matter" in 2019 by PeopleAsia Magazine. and was listed as one of the magazine's "People of the Year" in 2020 and 2022.

In March 2021, Moreno was adopted as a member of Sanlingan Class 2005 of the Philippine Military Academy. Also in 2021, he received a "Hero of the Year" recognition from Gawad Filipino Heroes Award for his efforts during the peak of the COVID-19 pandemic. The Philippine Movie Press Club (PMPC) awarded Moreno the "Inspirational and Outstanding Leader Award" in recognition of his "exceptional city governance and excellent response to the ongoing COVID-19 pandemic" in the same year.

Moreno received the "Golden Peacock Award of Excellence" in 2021 from the Federation of Indian Chambers of Commerce Inc. (FICCI) Philippines in recognition of the city government's service to the city's residents and businesspersons.

In April 2022, the Mrs. Universe Philippines Foundation awarded Moreno as one of the "Philippines' Most Exceptional Men of 2022".

In October 2022, he received a "Gawad Sulo for Public Service Award" from the Philippine Normal University at their 2022 Gawad Sulo for Public Service and Salute to Excellence event.

In April 2014, Moreno was conferred with an honorary degree of Doctor of Humanities in Community Development (Honoris Causa) by the Pamantasan ng Lungsod ng Maynila. On December 12, 2020, he received an honorary degree of Doctor of Laws (Honoris Causa) from San Beda University.

=== Acting ===
- 2013 – Darling of the Press (Special Award) Winner at the PMPC Star Awards for Movies
- 1998 – Male Star of the Night (Special Award) Winner at the PMPC Star Awards for Movies

== Electoral history ==
Electoral history of Isko Moreno
Election Year	Position	Party		Votes for Moreno				Result
Election Year	Position	National	Local	Total	%	Plc.	Swing	Result
1998	Councilor (Manila–1st)	Liberal	—N/a	40,695	36.29%	5th	—N/a	Won
2001	Councilor (Manila–1st)	Liberal	—N/a	74,643	73.26%	1st	+36.97%	Won
2004	Councilor (Manila–1st)	PDP–Laban	—N/a	79,881	64.97%	2nd	–8.29%	Won
2007	Vice Mayor of Manila	PDP–Laban	Asenso	176,215	32.71%	1st	—N/a	Won
2010	Vice Mayor of Manila	Nacionalista	Asenso	498,609	79.86%	1st	+47.15%	Won
2013	Vice Mayor of Manila	UNA	Asenso	395,156	62.78%	1st	–17.08%	Won
2016	Senator of the Philippines	PMP	—N/a	11,126,944	24.74%	16th	—N/a	Lost
2019	Mayor of Manila	NUP	Asenso	357,925	50.15%	1st	—N/a	Won
2025	Mayor of Manila	Aksyon	—N/a	530,825	59.02%	1st	—N/a	Won
2022	President of the Philippines	Aksyon	—N/a	1,933,113	3.59%	4th	—N/a	Lost

== Filmography ==
=== Film ===
Year	Title	Role	Director	Note(s)	Ref(s).
1993	Dalawang Larawan ng Pag-ibig			Cameo	
1993	May Minamahal	Carlitos Tagle (15 years old)	Jose Javier Reyes	Introducing (as Kiko Moreno)	
1994	Muntik Na Kitang Minahal	Toby	Mel Chionglo	First lead role	
1994	Eat All You Can	Jomar	Mike Relon Makiling		
1994	Brat Pack	Student	Deo Fajardo Jr.		
1995	Bocaue Pagoda Tragedy	Jun Jun	Maria Saret		
1995	Dodong Scarface	Eddie	Pepe Marcos		
1995	Pulis Patola 2	Robert	Felix E. Dalay		
1995	Pamilya Valderama	Elmer	Augusto Salvador		
1996	Tukso Layuan Mo Ako 2		Abbo Dela Cruz		
1997	Exploitation	Edward Santillan	Mauro Gia Samonte		
1997	Siya'y Nagdadalaga	Luis	Neal "Buboy" Tan		
1997	Frats	Kaloy	Armando Reyes		
1998	Mga Babae sa Isla Azul				
1999	Misteryosa		Neal "Buboy" Tan		
2014	Bonifacio: Ang Unang Pangulo	Padre José Burgos	Enzo Williams	Supporting Cast	
2019	3pol Trobol: Huli Ka Balbon!	Yorme	Rodel Nacianceno	Cameo	
2022	Yorme: The Isko Domagoso Story	Himself	Joven Tan	Narrator	
2023	Martyr or Murderer	Ninoy Aquino	Darryl Yap		
TBA	Malvar: Tuloy ang Laban	Andrés Bonifacio	Jose "Kaka" Balagtas		

=== Television ===
Year	Title	Network	Role	Note(s)	Ref(s).
1993	Young Love, Sweet Love	RPN	Doorbell Guy	1 episode – Extra/Uncredited	
1993–1996	That's Entertainment	GMA Network	Himself / Host / Performer	Monday group	
1994–1998	GMA Telesine Specials	GMA Network	Various roles	Various episodes (drama anthology series)	
1994	Maalaala Mo Kaya	ABS-CBN		Episode: "Manok"	
1995	Maalaala Mo Kaya	ABS-CBN		Episode: "Keychain"	
1995	Maalaala Mo Kaya	ABS-CBN		Episode: "Simbahan"	
1996	Kampus 101	IBC			
1996	Maalaala Mo Kaya	ABS-CBN		Episode: "Sagwan"	
1997	Maalaala Mo Kaya	ABS-CBN		Episode: "Puting Panyo"	
2000	Wansapanataym	ABS-CBN	Teban	Episode: "Wonder Jeepney"	
2002	Sana ay Ikaw na Nga	GMA Network		Guest	
2004	Maalaala Mo Kaya	ABS-CBN	Himself (cameo)	Episode: "Aklat"	
2005–2006	Mga Anghel na Walang Langit	ABS-CBN	Father Vincent		
2007	Bakekang	GMA Network	Victor	Guest star	
2008	Ligaw na Bulaklak	ABS-CBN	Mon D. Rodriguez		
2008	That's My Job	ABC (That is now on TV5)	Himself	Host	
2012	Gandang Gabi, Vice!	ABS-CBN	Himself	Guest	
2012	Wasak	AksyonTV	Himself	Guest	
2013	Dokumentado	TV5	Himself	Guest	
2014	The Ryzza Mae Show	GMA Network	Himself	Guest	
2019	Eat Bulaga!	GMA Network	Himself	Judge – Miss Millennial Philippines 2019 Grand Coronation Day	
2019	Kapuso Mo, Jessica Soho	GMA Network	Himself	Guest	
2019	Bubble Gang	GMA Network	Yorme	Cameo appearance (2 episodes)	
2019	Gandang Gabi, Vice!	ABS-CBN	Himself	Guest	
2020	Eat Bulaga!	GMA Network	Himself	Contestant – Bawal Judgmental Segment	
2020	Kapuso Mo, Jessica Soho	GMA Network	Himself		
2020	Magandang Buhay	ABS-CBN	Himself	Guest	
2021	7 Last Words	Kapamilya Channel	Himself	Testimony Sharer – First Word	
2022	Family Feud	GMA Network	Himself	Contestant – Domagoso Family	
2023–present	Iskovery Night	Scott Media Production Corp.	Himself / Host	Web series	
2023–2024	Eat Bulaga!	GMA Network	Himself / Host		
2024	Tahanang Pinakamasaya	GMA Network	Himself / Host		
2024	Black Rider	GMA Network	Santiago "Tiagong Dulas"		
2024	TiktoClock	GMA Network	Himself / Guest host		

NOTE: List includes short television guestings.

== Notes ==
Political offices
Preceded by Danilo Lacuna	Vice Mayor of Manila; 2007–2016	Succeeded by Honey Lacuna
Preceded by Joseph Estrada	Mayor of Manila; 2019–2022	Succeeded by Honey Lacuna
Preceded by Honey Lacuna	Mayor of Manila; 2025–present	Incumbent
Party political offices
New political party	Deputy Leader of Asenso Manileño; 2005	Succeeded by Honey Lacuna
Preceded by Danilo Lacuna	Leader of Asenso Manileño; 2005–2024	Succeeded by Honey Lacuna
First	Asenso Manileño nominee for Vice Mayor of Manila; 2007, 2010, 2013	Succeeded by Honey Lacuna
Vacant Title last held by Danilo Lacuna	Asenso Manileño nominee for Mayor of Manila; 2019	Succeeded by Honey Lacuna
Preceded by Robbie Pierre Roco	President of Aksyon Demokratiko; 2021–present	Incumbent
Vacant Title last held by Raul Roco	Aksyon Demokratiko nominee for President of the Philippines; 2022	Most recent
Vacant Title last held by Maria Teresita Alsua	Aksyon Demokratiko nominee for Mayor of Manila; 2025	Most recent
Preceded by Honey Lacuna as Asenso Manileño nominee	Aksyon Demokratiko nominee for Mayor of Manila; 2025	Most recent
Order of precedence
Preceded by Foreign Charges d’Affaires de missi, Foreign Chargé d'Affaires ad interim	Order of Precedence of the Philippines as Mayor of Manila	Succeeded by Fernanda Lampas-Peralta as Presiding Justice of the Court of Appeals
