= Manila COVID-19 Field Hospital =

Field hospital in Manila, Philippines

- Manila Health Department
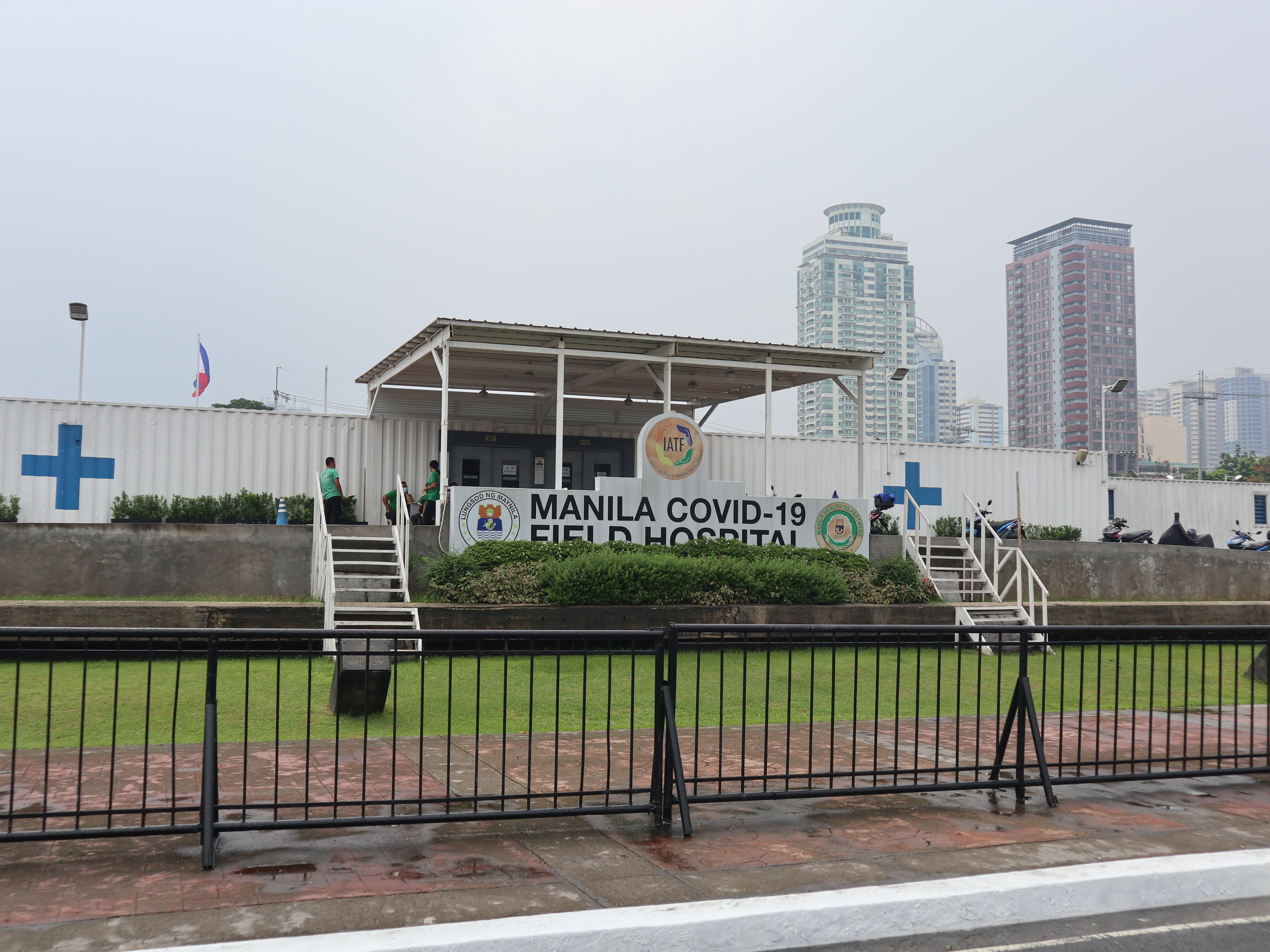

Geography
- Location: Rizal Park, Manila, Philippines
- Coordinates: 14°34′50.8″N 120°58′29.9″E

Organization
- Type: Field

Services
- Beds: 344

History
- Constructed: April 20, 2021
- Opened: June 25, 2021
- Closed: December 2022
- Demolished: January 2023

Links
- Lists: Hospitals in the Philippines

The Manila COVID-19 Field Hospital was a field hospital in Rizal Park in Manila, Philippines set up as a response against the COVID-19 pandemic, the first of its kind in the country.

== History ==
The Manila COVID-19 Field Hospital was built in Rizal Park by the Manila city government led by Mayor Isko Moreno as a response against the COVID-19 pandemic in the city. It is meant to quarantine mild to moderate COVID-19 cases. Moreno asked for permission from the Department of Tourism to build a temporary hospital in Rizal Park on August 12, which was approved two days later by the tourism department.

Groundbreaking for the temporary health facility began on April 20, 2021. The field hospital was built in 52 days by 362 construction workers. The facility was finished on June 11, 2021. ₱154 million was allotted for the hospital's construction. The hospital was inaugurated on June 24, 2021, and began operations the following day, also accepting non-residents of Manila.

The field hospital had an occupancy rate which rose as high as 92 percent; with 317 beds occupied out of its 344 beds on August 10, 2021.

In June 2022, the hospital was reported to operate up until only of December of the same year. In early January 2023, the hospital was dismantled ahead of the Feast of the Black Nazarene to be held on that site on January 9.

== Facilities ==
The Manila COVID-19 Field Hospital, built at the Burnham Green in Rizal Park, had a planned capacity of 336 beds–which could be expanded by 100 beds owing to its "scalable" design. The hospital at its opening had 344 beds. The hospital is a prefabricated building made from modular containers and had an air-conditioning system. It covers an area of 4,402 square meters (47,380 sq ft) It also had admitted non-Manila residents. A 12.2-meter (40 ft) container van was installed near the facility for temporary storage of bodies of COVID-19 casualties.
