= Early Childhood Care and Development Council =

Agency overview
- Formed: 13 January 2009
- Jurisdiction: Philippines
- Agency executive: Teresita Inciong, Executive Director
- Website: eccdcouncil.gov.ph

The Early Childhood Care and Development (ECCD) Council is a national government agency in the Philippines mandated to implement the National ECCD System which refers to the full range of health, nutrition, early education and social services development programs that provide for the basic holistic needs of young children from age zero (0) to four (4) years; and to promote their optimum growth and development. Stated in Section 5 (System Framework and Components) of Republic Act 10410 (Early Years Act of 2013), "The ECCD System shall ensure that the National ECCD Program is implemented in accordance with quality standards for accreditation and for this purpose there shall be established a National ECCD Monitoring and Evaluation Framework." RA 10410 is “An Act Recognizing The Age From Zero (0) To Eight (8) Years As The First Crucial Stage Of Educational Development And Strengthening The Early Childhood Care And Development System (ECCD System) Appropriating Funds Therefor and For Other Purposes.”

Guided by the responsibilities specified in the EYA Law, the Council focuses on the establishment of the national ECCD system that shall ensure the implementation of quality ECCD programs. The ECCD system has four major components, namely: ECCD curriculum; parent education and involvement, advocacy and mobilization of communities; human resource development, and ECCD management. The Council is tasked to: establish national ECCD standards, develop policies and programs, ensure compliance thereof, and provide technical assistance as well as program support to ECCD service providers.

Of paramount importance is the partnership that the Council has developed since 2014 with local government units, especially in the establishment of National Child Development Centers (NCDCs). The Council provides funds for the construction of the NCDC and teaching-learning resources. For its part, the local government provides the required land area and its development, the perimeter fence and playground structures. PAGCOR funds the establishment of NCDCs nationwide.

The Council consists of a Governing Board and a Council Secretariat. The member agencies of the Council are also its core partners, namely: the Department of Education (DepED), Department of Social Welfare and Development (DSWD), ECCD Council Secretariat, Department of Health (DOH), National Nutrition Council (NNC), the Union of Local Authorities of the Philippines (ULAP) and a private ECCD practitioner.

== History ==
On December 5, 2000, President Joseph Estrada into the law under Republic Act No. 8980 known as ECCD Act or Early Childhood Care and Development Act.

On January 13, 2009, President Gloria Macapagal-Arroyo signed Executive Order No. 778, also known as Transforming the Council for the Welfare of Children into the Early Childhood Care and Development Council.

On March 26, 2013, President Benigno Aquino III signs into the law under Republic Act No. 10410 or Early Years Act (EYA) of 2013.

On May 8, 2025, President Bongbong Marcos signs into the law under Republic Act No. 12199 known as Early Childhood Care and Development (ECCD) System Act. On August 5, 2026, the Implementing Rules and Regulations (IRR) of Republic Act No. 12199 was signed.

== Composition ==
The ECCD Council, which is an attached agency of the DILG, in accordance with Republic Act No. 12199, is composed of the following:

| Member | Position |
|---|---|
| Secretary of the Department of Interior and Local Government (DILG) | ex officio Co-Chairperson for Local Government Mobilization and Overall Implementation |
| Secretary of the Department of Education (DepEd) | ex officio Co-Chairperson for ECCD Curriculum and all matters related to early childhood education |
| Executive Director of the ECCD Council Secretariat | ex officio Vice Chairperson |
| Secretary of the Department of Agriculture (DA) | ex officio member |
| Secretary of the Department of Health (DOH) | ex officio member |
| Secretary of the Department of Social Welfare and Development (DSWD) | ex officio member |
| Chairperson of the Commission on Higher Education (CHED) | ex officio member |
| Director General of Technical Education and Skills Development Authority (TESDA) | ex officio member |
| Executive Director of the National Nutrition Council (NNC) | ex officio member |
| Early childhood education expert or practitioner | member |
| Representatives from the academe specializing in early childhood education | member |
