= Benny Abante =

Filipino politician and pastor (born 1951)

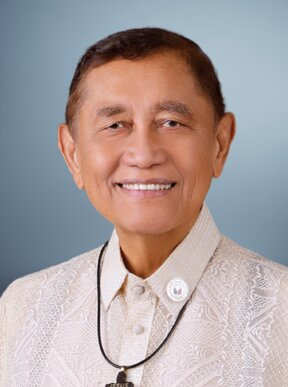
- Official portrait, 2026

Member of the Philippine House of Representatives from Manila's 6th congressional district
- Incumbent
- Assumed office July 8, 2025
- Preceded by: Himself (Note: Previous term expired; Abante was seated late as the ruling on the disqualification case of Joey Uy, who defeated him in the 2025 election, remained contested.)
- In office June 30, 2019 – June 30, 2025
- Preceded by: Sandy Ocampo
- Succeeded by: Himself
- In office June 30, 2004 – June 30, 2010
- Preceded by: Mark Jimenez
- Succeeded by: Sandy Ocampo

Deputy Speaker of the House of Representatives of the Philippines
- In office December 7, 2020 – June 1, 2022
- House Speaker: Lord Allan Velasco

House Minority Leader
- In office July 22, 2019 – October 16, 2020
- Preceded by: Danilo Suarez
- Succeeded by: Stephen Paduano

Commissioner of the Presidential Commission for the Urban Poor
- In office 1996–1998
- President: Fidel V. Ramos

Member of the Manila City Council from the 6th district
- In office June 30, 1992 – June 30, 1995

Personal details
- Born: Bienvenido Mirando Abante Jr. July 15, 1951 (age 75) Santa Mesa, Manila, Philippines
- Party: NUP (2011–2012, 2018–present); Asenso Manileño (local party; 2015–present)
- Other political affiliations: LDP (1992–1994); Lakas (1994–2011); UNA (2012–2018)
- Spouse: Marie Paz Toledo (m. 1977)
- Education: Far Eastern University; Citadel Baptist College (BA); Baptist Bible College (MA); Pamantasan ng Lungsod ng Maynila (MPA)
- Occupation: Politician; pastor

Bienvenido Mirando Abante Jr. (born July 15, 1951) is a Filipino politician and Bible-Baptist pastor currently serving as the representative of Manila's sixth district since 2019, a position he previously held from 2004 to 2010. He also served as a Deputy Speaker of the House from 2020 to 2022, Minority Leader of the House from 2019 to 2020, and as a member of the Manila City Council from 1992 to 1995. He is also the senior pastor of the Metropolitan Bible Baptist Ekklesia (formerly Metropolitan Bible Baptist Church and Ministries) in Santa Ana, Manila.

== Early life and education ==
Abante was born in Santa Mesa, Manila on July 15, 1951, as the eldest of four sons of Bienvenido "Ben" Oliver Abante Sr. and Priscilla de Leon Mirando both from Camarines Sur. He has three younger brothers, both of whom grew up to be political ministers.

While growing up, Abante took odd jobs such as shining shoes, selling newspapers and corsages, and working on a construction site. He also worked as an auditor. Abante earned his bachelor's degree from Far Eastern University in 1971. Later, he graduated with bachelor's and graduate degrees in theology at Baptist Bible College in Springfield, Missouri, and Baptist Bible College in Makati, respectively. He also holds a master's degree in Government Management from Pamantasan ng Lungsod ng Maynila.

== Theological career ==
In 1975, he founded the Metropolitan Bible Baptist Church and Ministries in Santa Ana, Manila. He also worked in academic institutions, serving as president of Metropolitan Lighthouse Theological School and Institute in Quezon City and administrator of the Metropolitan International Christian Academy in Manila in 1985. He was conferred an honorary degree in theology by The Citadel Baptist College in 1985 and an honorary doctor of theology degree at Indianapolis Baptist College in 1987.

In 1986, he founded the Bible Believers League for Morality and Democracy (BIBLEMODE), and also heads the Abante International Ministries (AIM), the Grace and Truth Community International Foundation, Inc., and the Ben O. Abante Baptist Bible College.

== Early political career ==
Abante served as a Councilor of Manila from the 6th district from 1992 to 1995. In August 1993, he sponsored a proposed ordinance prohibiting the exhibition of films in Manila that either glorify criminals or feature excessive sex scenes, arguing that these types of films "destroy the moral integrity and character of a person." He received recognition from the Manila City Hall Press Club in 1994. After his term as councilor, he ran for vice mayor in 1995, with former Mayor Mel Lopez as his running mate, but both lost.

He served as commissioner of the Presidential Commission for the Urban Poor from 1996 to 1998. He was also named special assistant to the national chairman of Lakas–NUCD in 2000.

== House of Representatives ==
=== Elections ===
Abante ran for a seat in the House of Representatives for Manila's 6th district in 2001, but lost to Mark Jimenez. Following the election, he and former 6th district representative Sandy Ocampo filed a petition for quo warranto before the House of Representatives Electoral Tribunal (HRET), challenging Jimenez's eligibility based on his failure to meet the constitutional one-year residency requirement. The HRET ultimately upheld the petition and unseated Jimenez on March 6, 2003.

Abante once again ran for and, this time, won a seat in the House of Representatives in 2004. Abante was reelected in 2007, but was defeated in 2010, by former representative Sandy Ocampo. He attempted a comeback to Congress in 2013 and 2016 but was unsuccessful, losing both to Ocampo. Abante was elected as Representative of Manila's 6th district in 2019, with the previous incumbent, Ocampo, ineligible for re-election. He ran against councilor Cassy Sison and newcomer Yvette Ocampo, Sandy's sister. He ran under the banner of Asenso Manileño with Isko Moreno running for mayor. He was re-elected in 2022.

Abante ran again for congressman in 2025, but narrowly lost to councilor Joey Uy. However, the COMELEC Second Division proclaimed him as the duly re-elected representative after Uy's candidacy was declared void due to his citizenship. On June 30, 2025, COMELEC en banc ruled with finality declaring Uy's candidacy null and void and affirmed Abante's reelection. Abante was formally proclaimed congressman on July 8.

=== Tenure ===
He was subsequently named chairman of the Committee on Public Information. His legislative work in his district addressed health, education, social services, and infrastructure development and/or improvement. Abante's committee also scrutinized the Right of Reply Bill that was criticized by the media organizations as a curtailment of the freedom of the press. He also proposed an Anti-Sex Video Bill that imposes stiffer penalties on the people involved in the manufacture of sex videos. He was one of the principal authors of the Freedom of Information (FOI) Bill during the 14th Congress. The FOI bill was defeated in Congress after its opponents questioned whether there was a quorum on the final session day.

On July 10, 2020, he was one of the 11 representatives who voted to grant the franchise renewal of ABS-CBN. He was one of the two Manila lawmakers to grant the franchise, along with Edward Maceda.

In late 2024, Abante headed the Quad Committee, which launched inquiries on alleged extrajudicial killings and other irregularities during the war on drugs campaign under former president Rodrigo Duterte. Alongside Santa Rosa Representative Danilo "Dan" Fernandez, he stepped down as the co-chairman of the committee in November 2024 after former Mandaluyong City Police Chief Hector Grijaldo accused them of pressuring him to admit the existence of the drug war reward system.

But in February 2025 QuadCom hearings, he cursed "ah---namo" which means "your mother". His reason for this was due to his anger at a content creator who accused him of being a protector of illegal drugs. His actions caught his committee co-members off-guard and Fernandez reminded him of his decorum.

== Political positions ==
=== LGBT issues ===
In 2010, Abante filed a bill proposing the criminalization of same sex unions, which he views as "highly immoral, scandalous, and detestable." The bill sought to penalize couples and the solemnizing officer by fines and imprisonment.

He has also filed a bill to institutionalize the rights of heterosexual people, including the guarantee of their right to express opinions about LGBT issues according to their religious beliefs, practices, and biblical principles and standards. Since there were efforts to introduce bills protecting the rights of LGBT people, Abante argued that in the spirit of "justice, equity, and fair play", a bill on heterosexuals, whom he described as "actual and direct creations of God" is appropriate. he further asserted that LGBT people who face discrimination must "be what God created us to be".

Abante has opposed the passage of legislation guaranteeing rights of members of the LGBT community, believing that such measures would eventually lead to the legalisation of same sex unions. He views LGBT rights as more of a "moral issue" than a "rights issue". He opposed the SOGIE Equality Bill, saying the constitution already grants sufficient rights.

Despite his stances, Abante says he does not discriminate against the LGBT community, noting that he has supporters who are LGBT.

=== Pornography ===
Abante has aimed to legislate a measure banning pornography. His House Bill No. 3305 was passed by the House of Representatives in 2008, which would prohibit the production of pornographic videos regardless of whether the subjects are adults or children; consensual or non-consensual.

=== Capital punishment ===
Abante supports capital punishment for crimes consisting of the following offenses: drug trafficking, massacre, child rape, and rape-slay. He had supported president Rodrigo Duterte's proposal to restore the death penalty for drug-related and heinous crimes.

== Personal life ==
Abante married Marie Paz Toledo in 1977 and has three children. His daughter Priscilla Marie is a lawyer and served as a councilor of Manila from the 6th district from 2013 to 2022 and spokesperson of the House of Representatives of the Philippines since 2025. His son, Benny Fog III is an incumbent councilor from the same district since 2022.

== Electoral history ==
Electoral history of Benny Abante
| Year | Office | Party | | Votes received | | | | Result |
| Year | Office | Local | National | Total | % | P. | Swing | Result |
|---|---|---|---|---|---|---|---|---|
| 1992 | Councilor (Manila–6th) | —N/a | LDP | 35,633 | —N/a | 3rd | —N/a | Won |
| 1995 | Vice Mayor of Manila | —N/a | Lakas | 86,386 | 14.78% | 3rd | —N/a | Lost |
| 2001 | Representative (Manila–6th) | —N/a | Lakas | 21,967 | —N/a | 3rd | —N/a | Lost |
| 2004 | Representative (Manila–6th) | —N/a | Lakas | 41,241 | 55.44% | 1st | —N/a | Won |
| 2007 | Representative (Manila–6th) | —N/a | Lakas | 40,371 | —N/a | 1st | —N/a | Won |
| 2010 | Representative (Manila–6th) | —N/a | Lakas | 38,113 | 36.82% | 2nd | —N/a | Lost |
| 2013 | Representative (Manila–6th) | —N/a | UNA | 40,571 | 47.80% | 2nd | —N/a | Lost |
| 2016 | Representative (Manila–6th) | Asenso | UNA | 48,260 | 45.35% | 2nd | —N/a | Lost |
| 2019 | Representative (Manila–6th) | Asenso | NUP | 49,795 | 46.21% | 1st | —N/a | Won |
| 2022 | Representative (Manila–6th) | Asenso | NUP | 95,431 | 79.37% | 1st | —N/a | Won |
| 2025 | Representative (Manila–6th) | Asenso | NUP | 63,358 | 49.46% | 2nd | —N/a | Won (Note: The Commission on Elections ruled that Uy's certificate of candidacy is void ab initio; declared Benny Abante as the duly elected representative of the district.) |

== Notes ==
Political offices
| Preceded by Danilo Suarez | House Minority Floor Leader; 2019–2020 | Succeeded by Joseph Stephen Paduano |
House of Representatives of the Philippines
| Preceded by Mark Jimenez | Member of the House of Representatives from Manila's 6th district 2004–2010 | Succeeded by Sandy Ocampo |
| Preceded by Sandy Ocampo | Member of the House of Representatives from Manila's 6th district 2019–present | Incumbent |
