= 2004 Manila local elections =

13th Mayoral election in the City of Manila

2004 Manila mayoral election
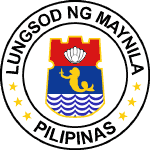
- May 10, 2004
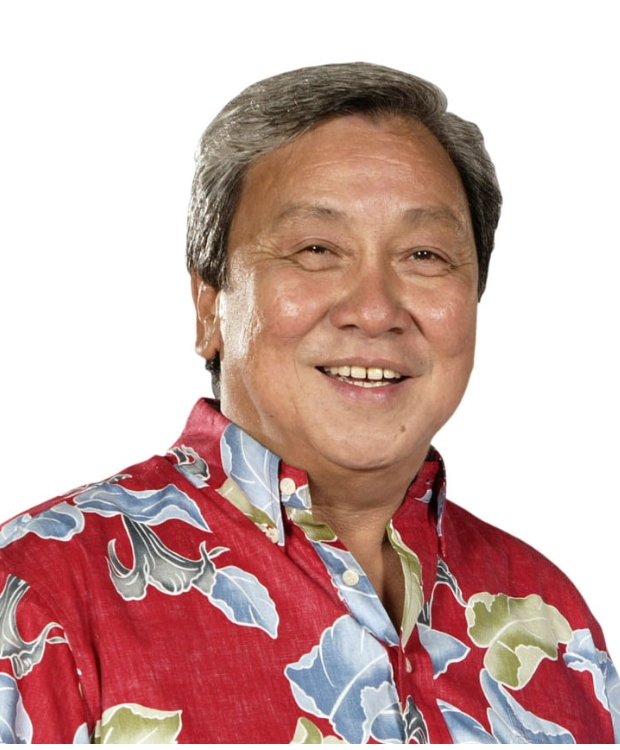

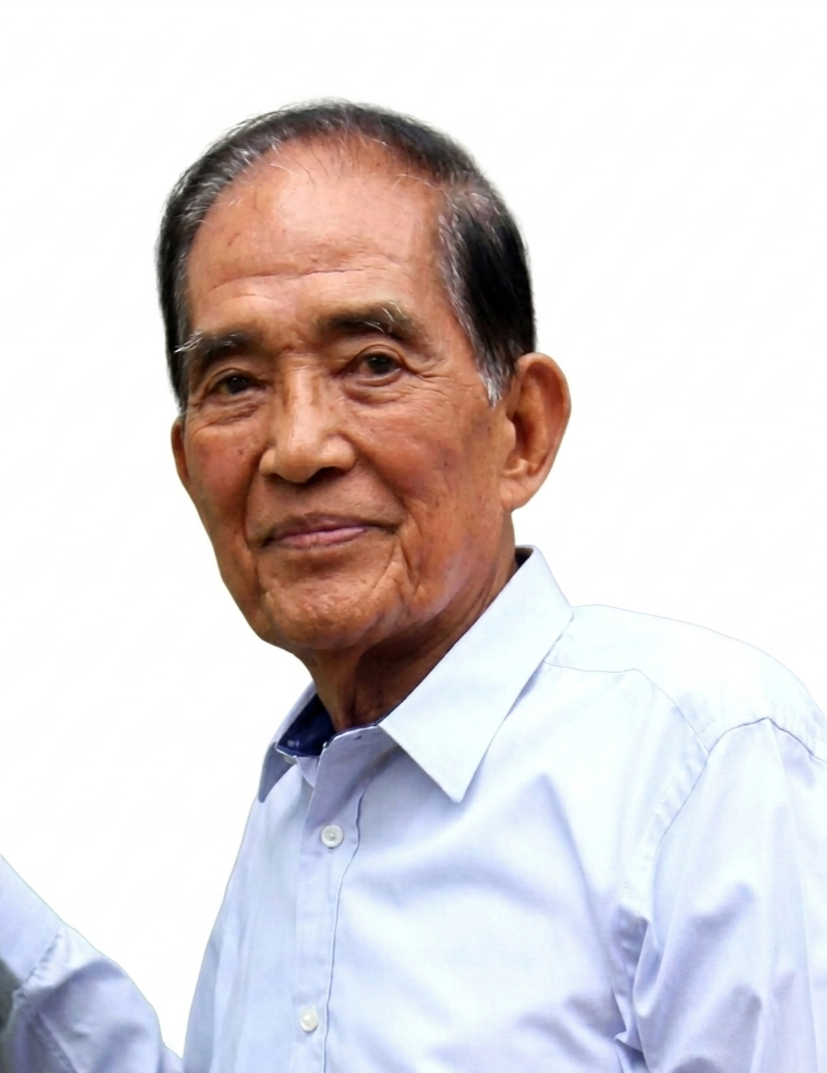
| Nominee | Lito Atienza | Mel Lopez |
| Party | Liberal | KNP |
| Running mate | Don Ramon Bagatsing | Danny Lacuna (PDP–Laban) |
| Popular vote | 455,302 | 219,580 |
| Percentage | 67.46 | 32.54 |
Mayor before election
Lito Atienza
Liberal
Elected mayor
Lito Atienza
Liberal
- Vice mayoral election
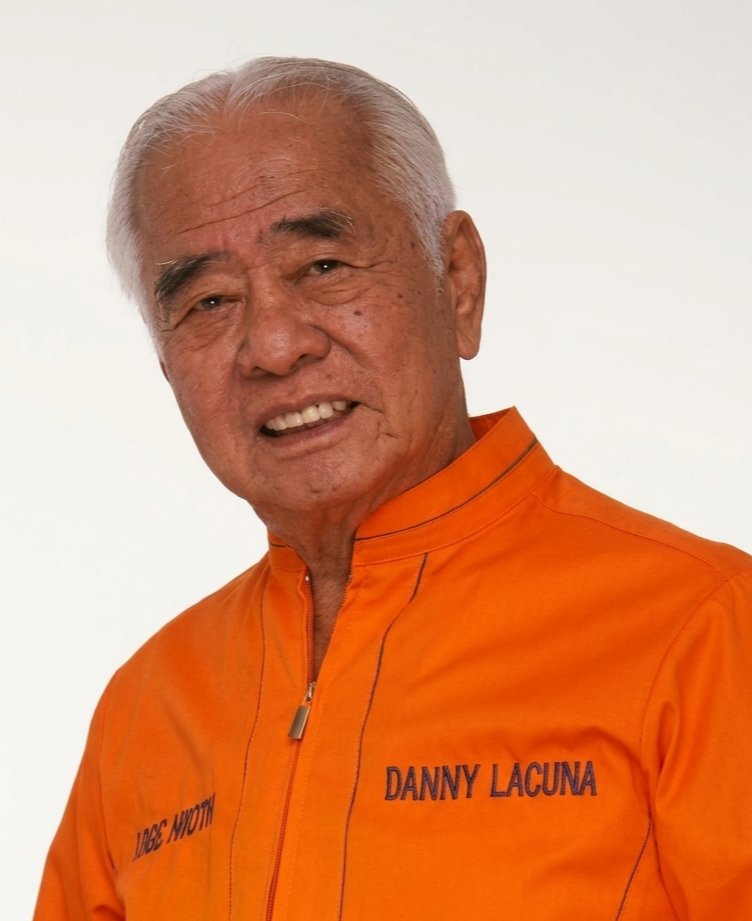
| Candidate | Danny Lacuna | Don Ramon Bagatsing |
| Party | PDP–Laban | Liberal |
| Popular vote | 380,758 | 271,668 |
| Percentage | 57.90 | 41.31 |
Vice Mayor before election
Danny Lacuna
PDP–Laban
Elected Vice Mayor
Danny Lacuna
PDP–Laban

Local elections were held in Manila on May 10, 2004, within the Philippine general election. The voters elected the elective local posts in the city: the mayor, vice mayor, the six Congressmen, and the councilors, six in each of the city's six legislative districts.

Incumbent Mayor Lito Atienza of Liberal forged an alliance with Don Ramon Bagatsing, who is the leader of Laban ng Demokratikong Pilipino (LDP) Manila chapter. The tandem faced former 1988 opponent Mel Lopez and incumbent Vice Mayor Danny Lacuna.

== Results ==
=== For Mayor ===
Incumbent Mayor Lito Atienza won his third consecutive term against former Mayor Mel Lopez.

Manila Mayoral election
| Party | Candidate | Votes | % |
|---|---|---|---|
| Liberal | Lito Atienza | 455,302 | 67.46 |
| KNP | Mel Lopez | 219,580 | 32.54 |
| Independent | Felix Cantal | 2,671 | 0.39 |
| Independent | Onofre Abad | 803 | 0.12 |
| Independent | Eduardo Fernandez | 535 | 0.08 |
| Independent | Antonio Gamo | 367 | 0.05 |
| Total votes | | 679,258 | 100.00 |
| Liberal hold | | | |

=== For Vice Mayor ===
Incumbent Vice Mayor Danny Lacuna defeated his opponent, Councilor Don Ramon Bagatsing.

Manila vice mayoral election
| Party | Candidate | Votes | % |
|---|---|---|---|
| PDP–Laban | Danny Lacuna | 380,758 | 57.90 |
| Liberal | Don Ramon Bagatsing | 271,668 | 41.31 |
| Independent | Manuel Andrada | 3,180 | 0.48 |
| Independent | Jamboy Odiamar | 1,456 | 0.22 |
| PIBID | Major Buleg | 512 | 0.08 |
| Total votes | | 657,574 | 100.00 |
| PDP–Laban hold | | | |

=== For Representatives ===
==== First District ====
2004 Philippine House of Representatives election at Manila's 1st district
| Party | Candidate | Votes | % |
|---|---|---|---|
| Liberal | Ernesto Nieva | 120,570 | 92.70 |
| NPC | Rodolfo Quirante | 8,856 | 6.81 |
| KBL | Abraham Liguidliguid | 635 | 0.49 |
| Total votes | | 130,061 | 100.00 |
| Liberal hold | | | |

==== Second District ====
2004 Philippine House of Representatives election at Manila's 2nd district
| Party | Candidate | Votes | % |
|---|---|---|---|
| Lakas | Jaime Lopez | 46,495 | 51.20 |
| Liberal | Marlon Lacson | 43,980 | 48.43 |
| Independent | Robert Brent Mendoza | 336 | 0.37 |
| Total votes | | 90,811 | 100.00 |
| Lakas hold | | | |

==== Third District ====
Incumbent Harry Angping (NPC) initially sought re-election but later withdrew from the race on May 4, 2004. He was substituted by his wife Zenaida Angping, but was disallowed by virtue of a ruling dated April 30, 2004, due to his disqualification on citizenship issues. This left incumbent Councilor Miles Roces running unopposed.

2004 Philippine House of Representatives election at Manila's 3rd district
| Party | Candidate | Votes | % |
|---|---|---|---|
| Liberal | Miles Roces | 6,347 | 100.00 |
| Total votes | | 6,347 | 100.00 |
| Liberal gain from NPC | | | |

==== Fourth District ====
2004 Philippine House of Representatives election at Manila's 4th district
| Party | Candidate | Votes | % |
|---|---|---|---|
| Liberal | Rodolfo Bacani | 56,713 | 54.23 |
| NPC | Manuel Bagatsing | 42,659 | 40.79 |
| Independent | Jose Icaonapo Jr. | 5,042 | 4.82 |
| Independent | Joel Sarza | 165 | 0.16 |
| Total votes | | 104,579 | 100.00 |
| Liberal hold | | | |

==== Fifth District ====
2004 Philippine House of Representatives election at Manila's 5th district
| Party | Candidate | Votes | % |
|---|---|---|---|
| LDP | Joey Hizon | 65,524 | 53.35 |
| Liberal | Kim Atienza | 56,592 | 46.07 |
| Independent | Gloria Wilma Encarnacion | 505 | 0.41 |
| Independent | Junel Alvarado | 207 | 0.17 |
| Total votes | | 122,828 | 100.00 |
| LDP hold | | | |

==== Sixth District ====
2004 Philippine House of Representatives election at Manila's 6th district
| Party | Candidate | Votes | % |
|---|---|---|---|
| Lakas | Benny Abante | 41,241 | 39.49 |
| NPC | Rosenda Ann Ocampo | 33,146 | 31.74 |
| PDP–Laban | Lou Veloso | 19,461 | 18.64 |
| Aksyon | Julio Logarta Jr. | 10,261 | 9.83 |
| LDP | Caridad Lao | 155 | 0.15 |
| Independent | Romeo Nuñez | 80 | 0.08 |
| Independent | Emmanuel Sunga | 59 | 0.06 |
| DGIPP | Oswaldo Galla | 20 | 0.02 |
| Total votes | | 104,423 | 100.00 |
| Lakas hold | | | |
