= 2010 Manila local elections =

15th Mayoral election in the City of Manila

2010 Manila mayoral election
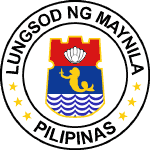
- May 10, 2010
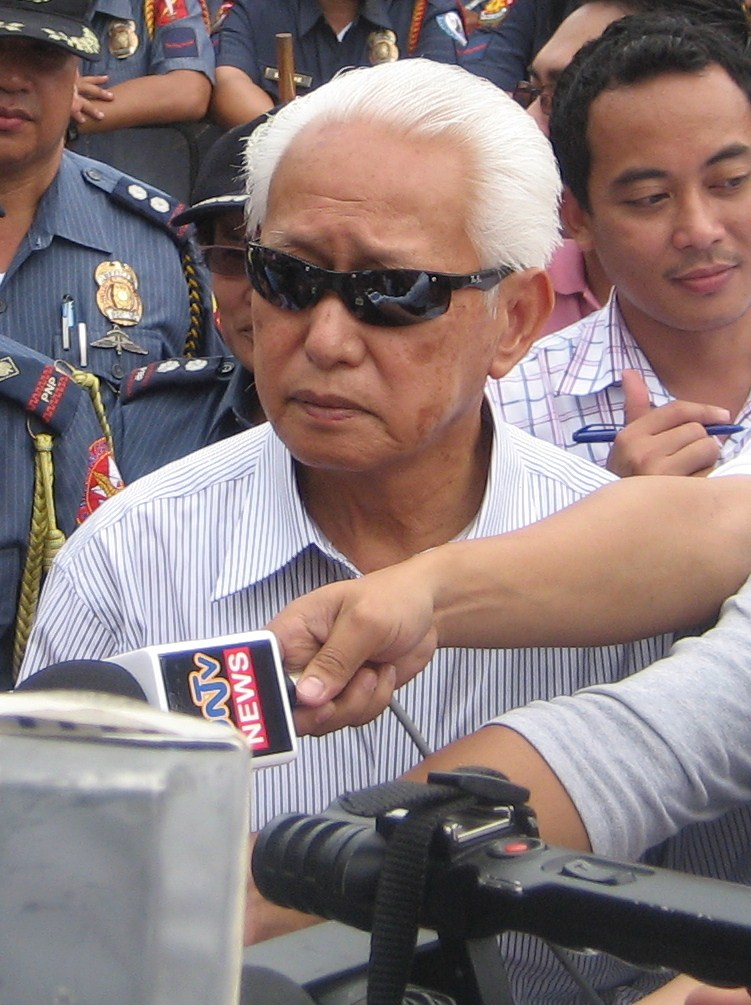

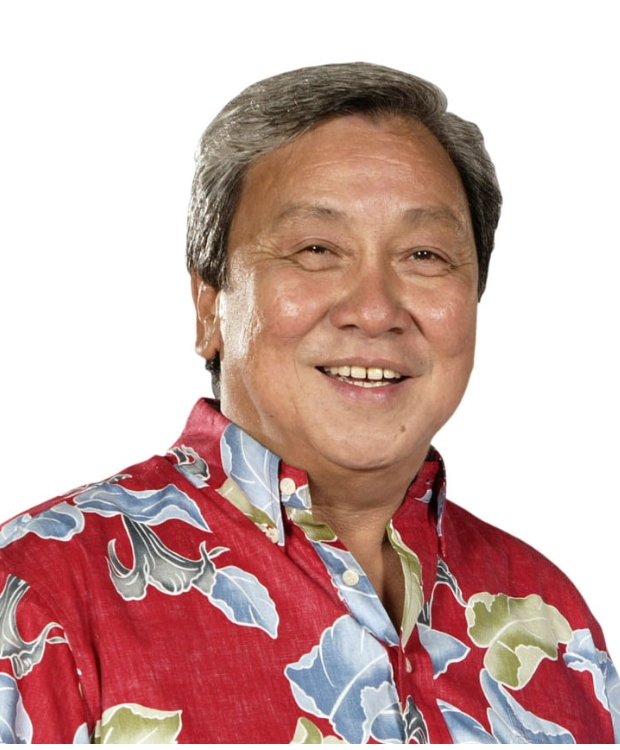
Nominee	Alfredo Lim	Lito Atienza
Party	Liberal	PMP
Alliance	KKK	Buhayin ang MayniLA
Running mate	Isko Moreno (Note: Moreno was registered on the ballot as a Nacionalista)	Maria Lourdes "Bonjay" Isip-Garcia
Popular vote	395,910	181,094
Percentage	59.52	27.22
Mayor before election
Alfredo Lim
Liberal
Elected mayor
Alfredo Lim
Liberal
- Vice mayoral election
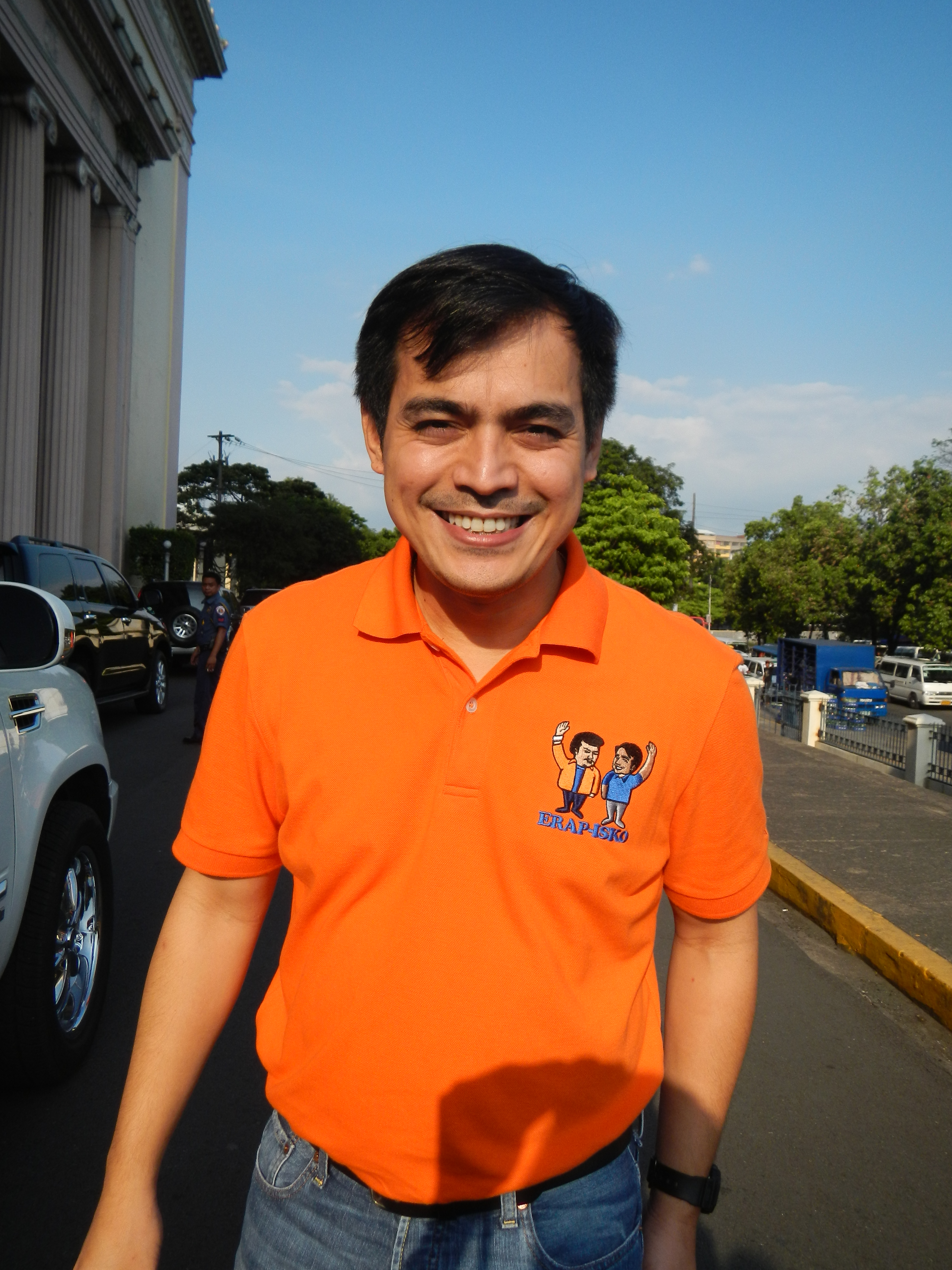
Candidate	Isko Moreno	Bonjay Isip-Garcia
Party	Nacionalista	PMP
Alliance	Asenso	Buhayin ang MayniLA
Popular vote	498,609	119,380
Percentage	79.86	19.12
Vice Mayor before election
Isko Moreno
Nacionalista/Asenso
Elected Vice Mayor
Isko Moreno
Nacionalista/Asenso
- City Council election

36 of 38 seats in the Manila City Council 20 seats needed for a majority
	First party	Second party	Third party
Party	PMP	Nacionalista	Liberal
Alliance	Buhayin ang MayniLA	Asenso	KKK
Seats won	14	12	9
Popular vote	1,225,039	977,597	781,092
Percentage	35.56	28.38	22.67

Local elections were held in the Manila on May 10, 2010, within the Philippine general election. The voters will elect for the elective local posts in the city: the mayor, vice mayor, the six Congressmen, and the councilors, six in each of the city's six legislative districts.

== Background ==
Presidential Adviser to the Peace Process Avelino Razon announced his candidacy on August 9, 2009 at the Ninoy Aquino Stadium running for the We Are the Reason Movement, under the Nationalist People's Coalition.

Mayor Alfredo "Fred" Lim and Vice Mayor Francisco "Isko Moreno" Domagoso announced their candidacies on Moreno's birthday party at the Rizal Memorial Coliseum on October 25, 2009, hosted by German Moreno (no relation to Isko), a known Lim ally and Isko's mentor. Moreno, despite being backed by the Asenso Manileño, will be Lim's running mate.

Former Mayor and Department of Environment and Natural Resources Secretary Lito Atienza ran to reclaim his seat. Atienza has Sixth District Councilor Ma. Lourdes "Bonjay" Isip-Garcia as his vice mayoral running mate. Isip-Garcia first won as Councilor in 1992 and later became both Deputy City Administrator and City Administrator. In 1992, she was the youngest elected councilor in Manila's history.

Atienza served as mayor from 1998 to 2007, and also served as Lim's running mate when Lim served as mayor from 1992 to 1998. Rep. Amado Bagatsing, a notable ally of Asenso founder Danny Lacuna, left the latter's party and joined Atienza's ship. Meanwhile, Lim supported the Liberal national ticket of Benigno "Noynoy" Aquino III and Mar Roxas, while holding his own Kapayapaan, Kaunlaran at Katarungan (Peace, Prosperity and Justice) standard; Moreno supported the Nacionalista ticket headed by Manuel Villar.

After announcement of the Lim-Moreno ticket, former Philippine National Police chief Avelino Razon announced that he had chosen Moreno as his running mate. After Moreno's announcement that he will run under Lim's banner, at least six councilors bolted from Asenso and went to Razon's side. Moreno eventually became a guest candidate in Razon's ticket, as his vice mayoral candidate.

The primary issue for the upcoming campaign is the retention of the oil depots at Pandacan. Lim and Moreno supported its retention while Atienza and Bagatsing supported its removal.

Atienza, leader of the Liberal's Atienza wing, which was not recognized by both the Commission on Elections and the Supreme Court, will be the "guest candidate" of the Joseph Estrada-led Pwersa ng Masang Pilipino (PMP). Atienza, a Gloria Macapagal Arroyo supporter, has maintained cordial relations with Estrada. In the end, Atienza's certificate of candidacy stated that he was nominated by Liberal, but under the "Buhayin ang MayniLA" (Revive Manila) ticket, and as a guest candidate of the PMP. His guest candidacy was later upgraded to a full-fledged nomination by the PMP as announced by the party's director for political affairs.

== Results ==
=== For Mayor ===
Mayor Alfredo "Fred" Lim defeated former Mayor and Department of Environment and Natural Resources Secretary Jose "Lito" Atienza Jr., and Presidential Adviser to the Peace Process Avelino Razon.

Manila Mayoral election
Party	Candidate	Votes	%
Liberal	Alfredo "Fred" Lim	395,910	59.52
PMP	Jose "Lito" Atienza Jr.	181,094	27.22
NPC	Avelino Razon (Note: Isko Moreno of Asenso Manileño–Nacionalista serves as his running-mate (guest candidate))	84,605	12.72
Independent	Ma. Teresita Hizon	1,900	0.29
Independent	Onofre Abad	662	0.10
Independent	Benjamin Rivera	558	0.08
Independent	Matilde Limbre	477	0.07
Majority		214,816	31.03%
Valid ballots		665,206	96.10
Invalid or blank votes		26,977	3.90
Total votes		692,183	100.00
Liberal hold			

- Lim's KKK party was in coalition with the Liberal Party.
- Atienza is belatedly nominated by Pwersa ng Masang Pilipino; he is indicated as an independent on the ballot.
- Razon's We Are the Reason Movement slate are guest candidates of the Nationalist People's Coalition and Lakas Kampi CMD.

=== For Vice Mayor ===
Vice Mayor Francisco "Isko" Moreno Domagoso narrowly defeated Sixth District Councilor Maria Lourdes "Bonjay" Isip-Garcia in vice mayoral race.

Manila vice mayoral election
Party	Candidate	Votes	%
Nacionalista	Francisco "Isko" Moreno Domagoso	498,609	79.86
PMP	Maria Lourdes "Bonjay" Isip-Garcia	119,380	19.12
LM	Francisco Pizarra	3,614	0.58
Independent	Benjamin Riano	2,765	0.44
Majority		379,229	60.74%
Valid ballots		624,368	90.20
Invalid or blank votes		67,815	9.80
Total votes		692,183	100.00
Nacionalista hold			

- Moreno's Asenso Manileño party is in coalition with the Nacionalista Party, and is a candidate of Lim's KKK and a "guest candidate" of Razon's We Are the Reason Movement.

=== For Representatives ===
==== First District ====
Rep. Benjamin "Atong" Asilo was also co-nominated by the KKK. Councilor Arlene Koa was co-nominated by Asenso Manileño. Former Rep. Ernesto Nieva, who was supposed to run again under Lakas-Kampi-CMD, died on February 16, 2010, due to cardiac arrest. His daughter Mina was designated as a candidate by substitution.

Philippine House of Representatives election at Manila's 1st district
Party	Candidate	Votes	%
KKK	Benjamin "Atong" Asilo	82,249	58.27
Lakas–Kampi	Mina Nieva	40,880	28.96
Nacionalista	Arlene Koa	14,090	9.98
KBL	Fernando Diaz	3,500	2.48
Independent	Ranilo Dacay	441	0.31
Valid ballots		141,160	93.92
Invalid or blank votes		9,135	6.08
Total votes		150,295	100.00
KKK hold			

==== Second District ====
Rep. Jaime Lopez of Lakas Kampi CMD was term limited. His son Councilor Carlo Lopez, ran for his place.

Philippine House of Representatives election at Manila's 2nd district
Party	Candidate	Votes	%
Liberal	Carlo Lopez	47,710	55.51
Nacionalista	Rolan Valeriano	37,141	43.21
Independent	Jaime Balmas	902	1.05
Independent	Jeffry Alacre	203	0.24
Valid ballots		85,956	92.37
Invalid or blank votes		7,097	7.63
Total votes		93,053	100.00
Liberal gain from Lakas–Kampi			

==== Third District ====
Rep. Zenaida "Naida" Angping won over Councilor Manuel Zarcal.

Philippine House of Representatives election at Manila's 3rd district
Party	Candidate	Votes	%
NPC	Zenaida Angping	62,085	64.06
PMP	Manuel Zarcal	32,634	33.67
Independent	Erlinda Reyes	912	0.94
Independent	Cristina Zamora	512	0.53
Independent	Wally Dizon	389	0.40
Independent	Rodolfo Flores	381	0.40
Valid ballots		96,913	94.00
Invalid or blank votes		6,182	6.00
Total votes		103,095	100.00
NPC hold			

==== Fourth District ====
Rep. Trisha Bonoan-David defeated her predecessor, former Rep. Rodolfo "Rudy" Bacani.

Philippine House of Representatives election at Manila's 4th district
Party	Candidate	Votes	%
Lakas–Kampi	Trisha Bonoan-David	56,769	55.13
Liberal	Rodolfo "Rudy" Bacani	46,206	44.87
Valid ballots		102,975	94.96
Invalid or blank votes		5,464	5.04
Total votes		108,439	100.00
Lakas–Kampi hold			

==== Fifth District ====
Rep. Amado Bagatsing defeated his predecessor former Rep. Joey Hizon.

Philippine House of Representatives election at Manila's 5th district
Party	Candidate	Votes	%
KABAKA	Amado Bagatsing	70,852	59.04
Nacionalista	Joey Hizon	47,902	39.92
Independent	Rodicindo Yee Rodriguez II	626	0.52
Independent	Jayson Española	618	0.52
Valid ballots		119,998	92.92
Invalid or blank votes		9,148	7.08
Total votes		129,147	100.00
Lakas–Kampi hold			

==== Sixth District ====
Former Rep. Rosenda Ann "Sandy" Ocampo defeated her closest rivals, incumbent Rep. Bienvenido "Benny" Abante Jr. and former Vice Mayor Danny Lacuna.

Philippine House of Representatives election at Manila's 6th district
Party	Candidate	Votes	%
KKK	Rosenda Ann "Sandy" Ocampo	39,985	38.63
Lakas–Kampi	Bienvenido "Benny" Abante Jr.	38,113	36.82
Nacionalista	Danny Lacuna	24,866	24.03
Independent	Ramon Villanueva	204	0.20
Independent	Joven Yuson	160	0.16
PGRP	Marlo Gerardo Artacho	96	0.09
Bigkis	Ronaldo Tibig	76	0.07
Valid ballots		103,500	95.70
Invalid or blank votes		4,654	4.30
Total votes		108,154	100.00
KKK gain from Lakas–Kampi			

=== City Council elections ===
Each of Manila's six legislative districts sends six councilors to the City Council. The election is via plurality-at-large voting: A voter can vote up to six candidates; the six candidates with the highest number of votes in a particular district are elected.

==== Summary ====
Party	Votes	%	Seats
Pwersa ng Masang Pilipino	1,225,039	35.56	14
Nacionalista Party	977,597	28.38	12
Liberal Party	781,092	22.67	9
Nationalist People's Coalition	317,923	9.23	1
Kapayapaan, Kaunlaran at Katarungan	34,999	1.02	0
Kilusang Bagong Lipunan	4,882	0.14	0
Lapiang Manggagawa	983	0.03	0
Philippine Green Republican Party	518	0.02	0
Independent	102,134	2.96	0
Ex officio seats			2
Total	3,445,167	100.00	38
Total votes	689,186	–	

==== First District ====
Manila 1st District Sangguniang Panlungsod election
Party	Candidate	Votes	%
Liberal	Ernesto "Ernix" Dionisio, Jr.	88,334	11.39
NPC	Erick Ian Nieva	62,089	8.01
Liberal	Moises Lim	56,020	7.23
PMP	Dennis Alcoreza	54,776	7.07
Liberal	Niño dela Cruz	54,510	7.03
Nacionalista	Irma Alfonso	51,959	6.70
Nacionalista	Jesus Fajardo Sr.	51,218	6.51
PMP	Rolando Sy	45,683	5.89
Liberal	Ernesto Lim	41,329	5.33
PMP	Edwin Simbulan	33,151	4.28
Nacionalista	Arnel Angeles	32,771	4.23
PMP	Eduardo Solis	32,069	4.14
Liberal	Peter Ong	29,822	3.85
Liberal	Romeo Venturina	29,539	3.81
NPC	Dale Evangelista	14,348	1.85
Liberal	Silvestre Dumagat	13,243	1.71
Independent	Let Miclat	12,733	1.64
NPC	Rogelio Mangila	8,331	1.07
Independent	German Nuñez	7,289	0.94
PMP	Danilo Isiderio	6,180	0.80
KKK	Vicente Ocampo Jr.	6,111	0.79
PMP	Irineo Duran	5,604	0.72
NPC	Fermin de Jesus	5,277	0.68
KKK	Rogelio Bergado	5,144	0.66
Nacionalista	Ferdinand Sandoval	3,724	0.48
KBL	Almario Jacinto Jr.	2,906	0.37
Independent	Maria Ocampo	2,829	0.36
NPC	Exmila Rabano	2,161	0.28
KBL	Benedicto Rodriguez	1,976	0.25
Independent	Rejercito Aranas	1,943	0.25
Independent	Bernabe Binuya	1.844	0.24
Independent	Efren Natividad	1,643	0.21
Independent	Dennis Riano	1,454	0.19
Independent	Romano Sacramento	1,316	0.17
Independent	Jaime Pepino	1,265	0.16
Independent	Virginia Quintero	1,122	0.14
LM	Eduardo Lanuza	983	0.13
Independent	Vevincio Cinco	903	0.12
Independent	Luis Cabuang	651	0.08
Independent	Fortunata Gravina	592	0.08
Independent	Josue Longanilla	436	0.06
Total votes		156,160	100.00

==== 2nd District ====
Manila 2nd District Sangguniang Panlungsod election
Party	Candidate	Votes	%
PMP	Marlon Lacson	46,305	9.95
Nacionalista	Edward Tan	44,421	9.54
Nacionalista	Ruben Buenaventura	38,640	8.30
PMP	Numero "Uno" Lim	36,618	7.87
Liberal	Ramon Robles	36,194	7.78
Liberal	Rodolfo Lacsamana	34,333	7.38
Nacionalista	Nelissa Beltran	34,194	7.34
PMP	Pacifico Laxa	28,741	6.17
PMP	Ivy Varona	24,759	5.32
Nacionalista	Filomena Aligayo	22,247	4.78
PMP	John Mark Viceo	20,821	4.47
Liberal	Renato Torno Jr.	19,193	4.12
Liberal	Lourdes Gutierrez	18,912	4.06
Liberal	Ruben Bunag	17,398	3.74
PMP	Nida Buenaventura-Panti	13,196	2.83
NPC	Fernando Lopez	10,169	2.18
Independent	Cherry Doromal	5,659	1.22
Independent	Enrique Villegas	4,737	1.02
KKK	Liza Go	4,500	0.97
NPC	Jesus Peñoso	1,586	0.34
Independent	Joana Singson	1,394	0.30
Independent	Estrellita Geronimo	902	0.19
Independent	Herminio Manikad Jr.	630	0.14
Total votes		94,775	100.00

==== 3rd District ====
Manila 3rd District Sangguniang Panlungsod election
Party	Candidate	Votes	%
Liberal	Maria Asuncion Fugoso	60,510	12.14
Nacionalista	John Marvin "Yul Servo" Nieto	60,301	12.10
Nacionalista	Ernesto "Jong" Isip Jr.	51,238	10.28
Nacionalista	Bernardito Ang	49,414	9.92
PMP	Joel Chua	46,561	9.34
PMP	Ramon "Mon" Morales	40,351	8.10
Liberal	Thelma Lim	32,824	6.59
PMP	Roberto Ramon Oca	32,283	6.48
PMP	Larsil Silva	28,088	5.64
NPC	Alex Co	23,991	4.81
Nacionalista	Alberto Alonzo	19,721	3.96
PMP	Alejandro Gomez	10,573	2.12
NPC	Paul Alvarez	6,342	1.27
Liberal	Henryson Melon	5,802	1.16
Liberal	Michael James Gonzalez	5,091	1.02
NPC	Angelito Lopez	4,837	0.97
Independent	Gilbert Estrada	4,209	0.84
PMP	Don Neil dela Peña	3,490	0.70
NPC	Alfredo Isla Jr.	2,734	0.55
Independent	Rodrigo Abante	2,688	0.54
NPC	Elpidio de Sagun	2,326	0.47
Independent	Benito Aragon	1,114	0.22
Independent	Corazon Aringino	1,083	0.22
Independent	Ronaldo Santos	1,042	0.21
Independent	Merlie Gonio	584	0.12
Independent	Rolly Malayon	556	0.11
Independent	Pablo Carisosa	539	0.11
Total votes		103,095	100.00

==== 4th District ====
Manila 4th District Sangguniang Panlungsod election
Party	Candidate	Votes	%
PMP	Don Juan "DJ" Bagatsing	60,105	11.21
Nacionalista	Maria Sheilah "Honey" Lacuna-Pangan	57,859	10.83
PMP	Edward Maceda	57,720	10.81
PMP	Jocelyn "Jo" Quintos	56,156	10.63
Nacionalista	Louisito "Louie" Chua	51,778	9.80
Liberal	Eduardo Quintos XVI	41,353	7.83
Nacionalista	Arlan Vic Melendez	40,247	7.62
PMP	Susan Beltran	30,573	5.79
PMP	Gerino Tolentino	26,721	5.06
KKK	El Dorado Lim	19,244	3.64
NPC	Wilson Ramil	16,362	3.10
Nacionalista	Christopher Ortiz	12,598	2.39
Liberal	Magno Gaza	9,480	1.80
PMP	Ramon Padilla	8,858	1.68
Liberal	Richard Laurel	8,586	1.63
NPC	Ernesto Cayetano	7,694	1.46
PMP	Melchor Trinidad	6,527	1.24
Independent	Alexander Lim	4,599	0.87
Nacionalista	Pepito Suñiga	2,984	0.57
NPC	Milagros Coronel	2,788	0.53
NPC	Michael Gamaliel Plata	2,496	0.47
NPC	Frederick Constantino	2,394	0.45
PMP	Vicente Salgado	1,754	0.33
Independent	Norma Magat	1,712	0.32
Total votes		108,439	100.00

==== 5th District ====
Manila 5th District Sangguniang Panlungsod election
Party	Candidate	Votes	%
Liberal	Josefina "Josie" Siscar	68,409	10.62
Nacionalista	Raymundo "Mon" Yupangco	59,581	9.25
PMP	Cristina "Cristy" Isip	57,745	8.96
Nacionalista	Richard Ibay	54,170	8.41
PMP	Roberto Ortega Jr.	54,128	8.40
PMP	Rafael Borromeo	51,252	7.95
PMP	Corazon "Cora" Gernale	49,852	7.74
NPC	Roderick "Erick" Valbuena	42,957	6.67
Nacionalista	Bartolome Atienza	38,908	6.04
Liberal	Pablo Dario Ocampo IV	34,643	5.38
PMP	Jose Maria Cabreza	26,193	4.03
PMP	Harry Huecas	21,013	3.26
NPC	Miguel Badando	17,814	2.76
Nacionalista	Corina Cruz	14,187	2.20
NPC	Francis Villegas	11,597	1.80
NPC	Arturo "Turo" Valenzona	8,570	1.33
NPC	Susan Cabigao	8,318	1.29
Independent	Christopher Lim	8,243	1.28
NPC	Marlon Lopera	6,115	0.95
Independent	Raymundo Corpin	2,107	0.33
Independent	Marlon Villarojas	1,998	0.31
Independent	Eduardo Dado	1,374	0.21
Independent	Gina Gentio	1,247	0.19
Independent	Lailanie Lerit	1,228	0.19
Independent	Maria Ginny Clidoro	1,037	0.16
Independent	Reynaldo Madelo	911	0.14
Independent	Danny Boy Pacanut	798	0.12
Total votes		131,942	100.00

==== 6th District ====
Manila 6th District Sangguniang Panlungsod election
Party	Candidate	Votes	%
Liberal	Luciano "Lou" Veloso	66,126	12.33
Nacionalista	Danilo Victor "Dennis" Lacuna Jr.	58,590	10.94
Nacionalista	Elizabeth Rivera	56,168	10.49
PMP	Casimiro Sison	51,215	9.57
PMP	Luis "Joey" Uy	46,274	8.64
PMP	Jocelyn Dawis-Asuncion	43,854	8.19
PMP	Carlos Castañeda	40,645	7.59
Nacionalista	Richard Lontoc	32,398	6.05
Nacionalista	Joel Par	32,139	6.00
NPC	Julio Logarta Jr.	22,790	4.26
PMP	Vladimir Cabigao	16,838	3.15
PMP	Edward Quintos	10,147	1.90
Liberal	Felix Majabague	9,547	1.78
NPC	Vicente Quillope	9,194	1.72
NPC	Jose Antonio Ibay	8,193	1.53
Nacionalista	George Planas	6,842	1.28
NPC	Regina Aspiras	6,450	1.20
Independent	Urbano Castillo	4,341	0.81
Independent	Rosalina Alvarez	2,813	0.53
Independent	Segundina Jamias	2,717	0.51
Independent	Romeo Concepcion	1,765	0.33
Independent	Eduardo Tan	1,528	0.29
Independent	Imelda Roca	1,455	0.27
Independent	Michael Anglo	1,073	0.20
Independent	Rafael Avecilla	965	0.18
Independent	Wilfredo Meniano	908	0.17
PGRP	Mario Nicosia	518	0.10
Total votes		94,775	100.00

== Reaction ==
Lim won the election with more than 250,000 votes clear of Atienza, his nearest rival. After his proclamation on the afternoon of May 12, Lim thanked the Manileños for their support, as Razon conceded to Lim as early as before midnight of May 10. Atienza said that he will contest the result of election as the results did not match the random manual audit of the ballots. Moreno had an even easier time against his nearest rival, Bonjay Isip-Garcia as he won with a margin of almost 380,000 votes.

Atienza put the result under protest. The Commission on Elections' First Division dismissed Atienza's protest on September 13, 2011, confirmed later by the commission en banc, saying that votes included within Atienza's protest would not be enough to overtake Lim's lead. Atienza subsequently withdrew his protest on January 11, 2013.
