= Gonzalo Puyat II =

Filipino politician

Gonzalo G. Puyat, II

President of Basketball Association of the Philippines
- In office 1968–1995
- Preceded by: Ambrosio Padilla
- Succeeded by: Freddie Jalasco

President of FIBA
- In office 1976–1984
- Preceded by: Abdel Moneim Wahby
- Succeeded by: Robert Busnel

Mambabatas Pambansa (Assemblyman) from Manila
- In office June 30, 1984 – March 25, 1986 Serving with Eva Estrada-Kalaw, Carlos Fernando, Mel Lopez, Lito Atienza, and Arturo Tolentino

Member of the Manila City Council from the 4th District
- In office December 30, 1967 – December 30, 1975

Personal details
- Born: Gonzalo Gil Puyat II; May 21, 1933 Dipolog, Zamboanga, Philippine Islands
- Died: January 7, 2013 (aged 79) Makati, Metro Manila, Philippines
- Party: Lakas (1998)
- Other political affiliations: Nacionalista (1967–1975, 1987–1988); UNIDO (1984–1987)
- Known for: FIBA president

Gonzalo "Lito" Gil Puyat II (May 21, 1933 – January 7, 2013) was a Filipino sport administrator and politician. Puyat was the longest-serving president of the Basketball Association of the Philippines from 1968 to 1995 and was the president of FIBA for two terms from 1976 to 1984. Puyat later became an honorary president after his tenure as president of FIBA.

Puyat was elected as the city councilor of the 4th district of Manila in 1967. He became the minority floor leader in 1969 and was reelected as city councilor in 1971. Puyat was also elected as Manila's opposition assemblyman in 1984. After his term as assemblyman, he ran for Mayor of Manila in 1988, but later withdrew his candidacy.

Puyat died on January 7, 2013, due to cardiac arrest. He was reportedly rushed to the Makati Medical Center due to an asthma attack.
