= 1995 Manila local elections =

10th Mayoral election in the City of Manila

1995 Manila mayoral election
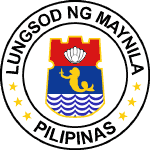
- May 8, 1995
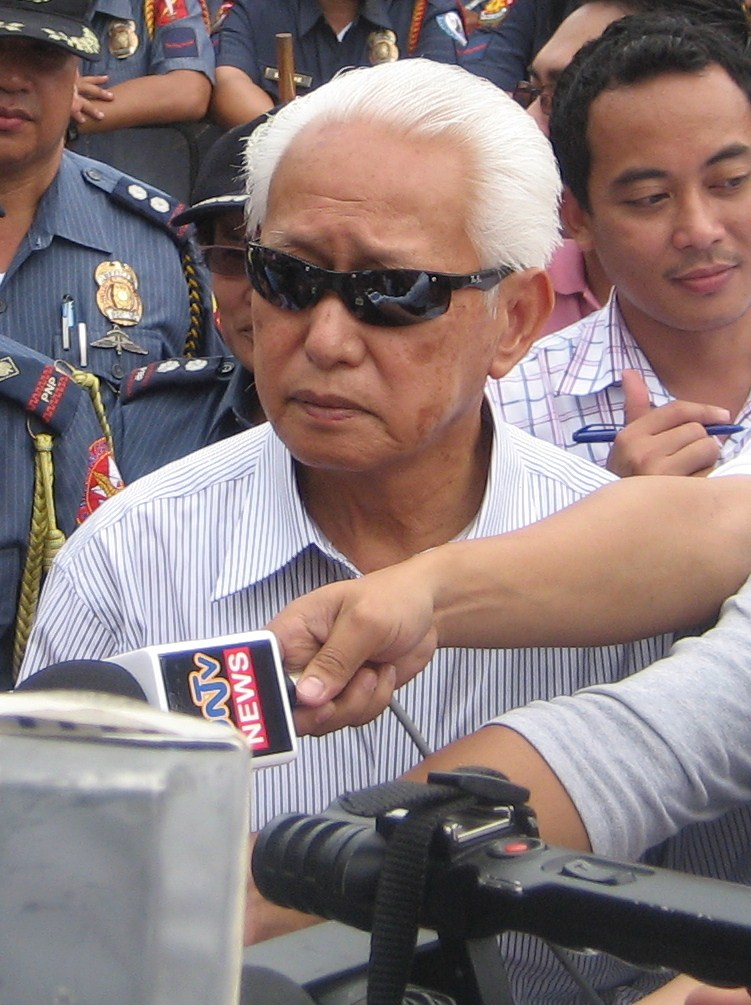

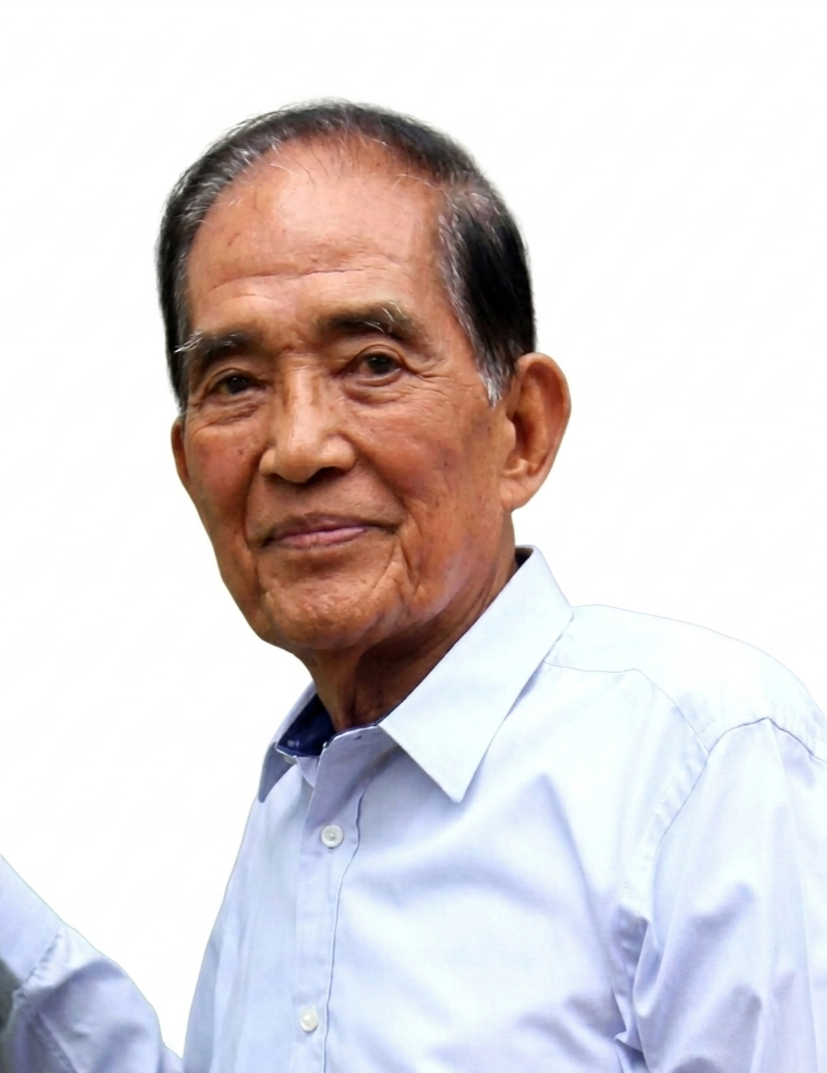
Candidate	Alfredo Lim	Mel Lopez
Party	PRP	Lakas
Running mate	Lito Atienza	Benny Abante
Popular vote	426,806	177,979
Percentage	69.37	28.93
Mayor before election
Alfredo Lim
PRP
Elected mayor
Alfredo Lim
PRP
- Vice mayoral election
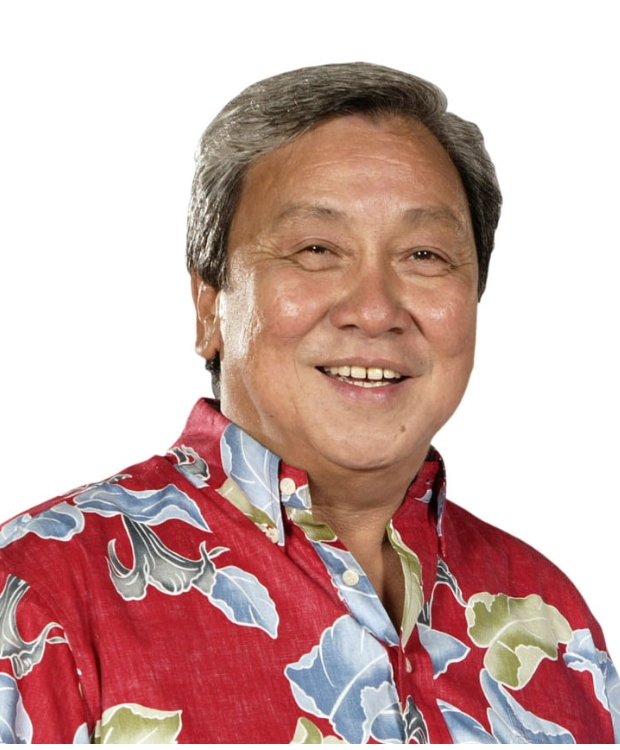

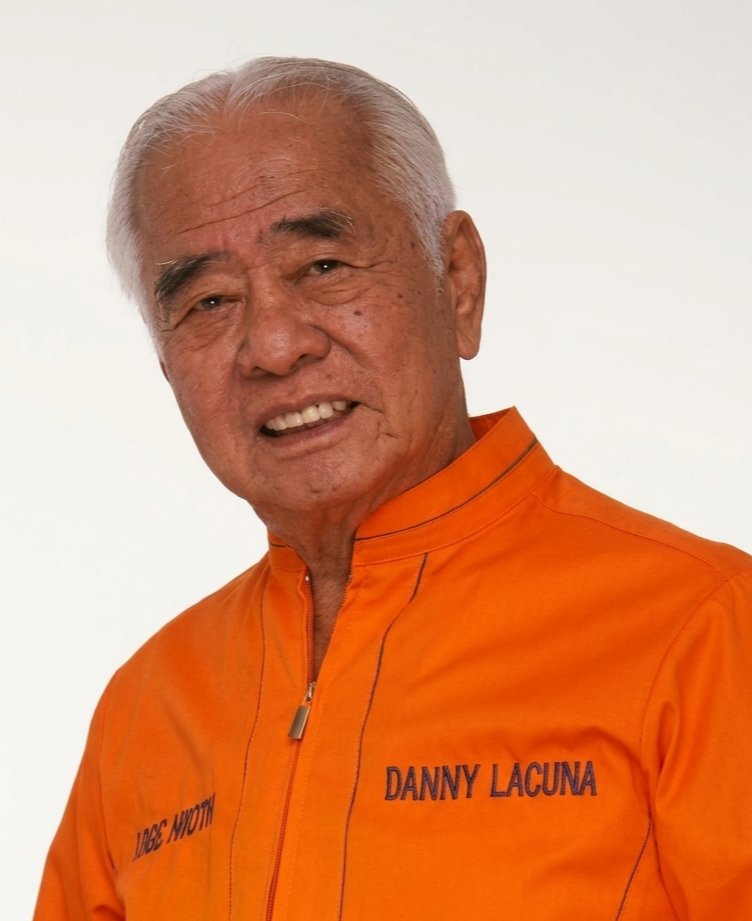

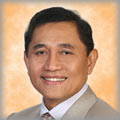
Candidate	Lito Atienza	Danny Lacuna	Benny Abante
Party	PRP	PDP–Laban	Lakas
Popular vote	285,984	203,325	68,359
Percentage	49.96	35.52	11.94
Vice Mayor before election
Lito Atienza
PRP
Elected Vice Mayor
Lito Atienza
PRP

Local elections was held in the City of Manila on May 8, 1995, within the Philippine general elections. The voters elected for the elective local posts in the city: the mayor, vice mayor, the six congressmen, and the councilors, six in each of the city's six legislative districts.

Incumbent Mayor Alfredo Lim faced again his 1992 opponent Mel Lopez, with Lim, and incumbent Vice Mayor Lito Atienza won re-election. Lim defeated Lopez and ex-councilor Chito Lucero, while Atienza defeated Danny Lacuna and councilor Benny Abante.

== Results ==
=== For Mayor ===
Incumbent mayor Alfredo Lim won the elections against former mayor Mel Lopez and former councilor Chito Lucero.

1995 Manila mayoral election
Candidate	Party	Votes	%
Alfredo Lim (incumbent)	People's Reform Party	426,806	69.37
Mel Lopez	Lakas–NUCD–UMDP	177,979	28.93
Chito Lucero	Kilusang Bagong Lipunan	9,736	1.58
Antonio Gamo	Independent	722	0.12
Total		615,243	100.00
People's Reform Party hold			
Source: Commission on Elections

=== For Vice Mayor ===
Incumbent vice mayor Lito Atienza won the elections against former vice mayor Danny Lacuna and 6th district councilor Benny Abante.

1995 Manila vice mayoral election
Candidate	Party	Votes	%
Lito Atienza (incumbent)	People's Reform Party	285,984	49.96
Danny Lacuna	PDP–Laban	203,325	35.52
Benny Abante	Lakas–NUCD–UMDP	68,359	11.94
Conrado Francisco	Independent	14,747	2.58
Total		572,415	100.00
People's Reform Party hold			
Source: Commission on Elections

=== Manila's 1st district ===
Incumbent Martin Isidro Sr. of Laban ng Demokratikong Pilipino was re-elected to a third term.

Candidate	Party	Votes	%
Martin Isidro Sr. (incumbent)	Laban ng Demokratikong Pilipino	79,202	75.18
Honorio Lopez II	Lakas–NUCD–UMDP	24,885	23.62
Johnny Regalado	Kilusang Bagong Lipunan	1,256	1.19
Total		105,343	100.00
Source: Commission on Elections

=== Manila's 2nd district ===
Incumbent Jaime Lopez of Lakas–NUCD–UMDP was re-elected to a third term.

Candidate	Party	Votes	%
Jaime Lopez (incumbent)	Lakas–NUCD–UMDP	39,818	48.11
Natalio Beltran Jr.	Nationalist People's Coalition	26,501	32.02
Reynaldo Jaylo	People's Reform Party	15,776	19.06
Antonio Martelino	Independent	666	0.80
Total		82,761	100.00
Source: Commission on Elections

=== Manila's 3rd district ===
Incumbent Leonardo Fugoso of the Liberal Party was re-elected to a third term.

Candidate	Party	Votes	%
Leonardo Fugoso (incumbent)	Liberal Party	36,297	49.54
Harry Angping	Lakas–NUCD–UMDP	25,029	34.16
Meliza Galang	Nationalist People's Coalition	9,561	13.05
Henry Palao	Lakas–NUCD–UMDP	1,235	1.69
Rosalinda Sia	Independent	943	1.29
Brigido Mesina Jr.	Independent	209	0.29
Total		73,274	100.00
Source: Commission on Elections

=== Manila's 4th district ===
Incumbent Ramon Bagatsing Jr. of Laban ng Demokratikong Pilipino was re-elected to a third term.

Candidate	Party	Votes	%
Ramon Bagatsing Jr. (incumbent)	Laban ng Demokratikong Pilipino	52,439	58.13
Ernesto Diokno	Lakas–NUCD–UMDP	24,888	27.59
Emilio Bonoan	Lapiang Manggagawa	12,889	14.29
Total		90,216	100.00
Source: Commission on Elections

=== Manila's 5th district ===
Incumbent Amado Bagatsing of Laban ng Demokratikong Pilipino was re-elected to a third term.

Candidate	Party	Votes	%
Amado Bagatsing (incumbent)	Laban ng Demokratikong Pilipino	80,653	84.37
Robert Evangelista	Lakas–NUCD–UMDP	14,937	15.63
Total		95,590	100.00
Source: Commission on Elections

=== Manila's 6th district ===
Incumbent Rosenda Ann Ocampo of the Nationalist People's Coalition was re-elected to a second term.

Candidate	Party	Votes	%
Rosenda Ann Ocampo (incumbent)	Nationalist People's Coalition	47,490	49.85
Casimiro Sison	Lakas–NUCD–UMDP	22,089	23.19
Maria Corazon Caballes	Laban ng Demokratikong Pilipino	13,957	14.65
Benedicto Dorado	Nacionalista Party	11,505	12.08
Castor Macariola	Independent	223	0.23
Total		95,264	100.00
Source: Commission on Elections

=== For Councilors ===
In the councilors, the following are elected:

- 1st district:
1. Ernesto "Banzai" Nieva (PRP)
2. Avelino "Toting" Cailian (PRP)
3. Gonzalo Gonzales (Lakas)
4. Abraham Cabochan
5. Alladin Dimagmaliw (Lakas)
6. Ernesto "Dionix" Dionisio Sr. (PRP)
- 2nd district:
1. Humberto "Bert" Basco (PRP)
2. Flaviano Concepcion Jr. (Lakas)
3. Nestor Ponce (PRP)
4. Francisco Varona (Lakas)
5. Marlon Lacson (PRP)
6. Abel Viceo (Lakas)
- 3rd district:
1. Jhosep Lopez
2. Manuel Zarcal (Lakas)
3. Pedro "Pete" de Jesus (PRP)
4. Larry Silva (Lakas)
5. Miles Roces
6. Alex Co (Lakas)
- 4th district:
1. Gerino "Rino" Tolentino (PRP)
2. Victoriano "Vic" Melendez (PRP)
3. Paz Herrera (PRP)
4. Eduardo Quintos Sr. (Lakas)
5. Edward Maceda (PRP)
6. Rodolfo "Rudy" Bacani (PRP)
- 5th district:
1. Joey Hizon (PRP)
2. Felix Espiritu (PRP)
3. Rogie dela Paz (PRP)
4. Kim Atienza (PRP)
5. Roger Gernale (PRP)
6. Pablo "Chikee" Ocampo I
- 6th district:
1. Ma. Lourdes Isip (Lakas)
2. Ernesto Rivera (Lakas)
3. Julio "Ging" Logarta Jr. (PRP)
4. Berting Ocampo (PRP)
5. Lou Veloso (PRP)
6. Butch Belgica (PRP)
