= Manila Jai Alai Building =

Building in Ermita, Manila, the Philippines

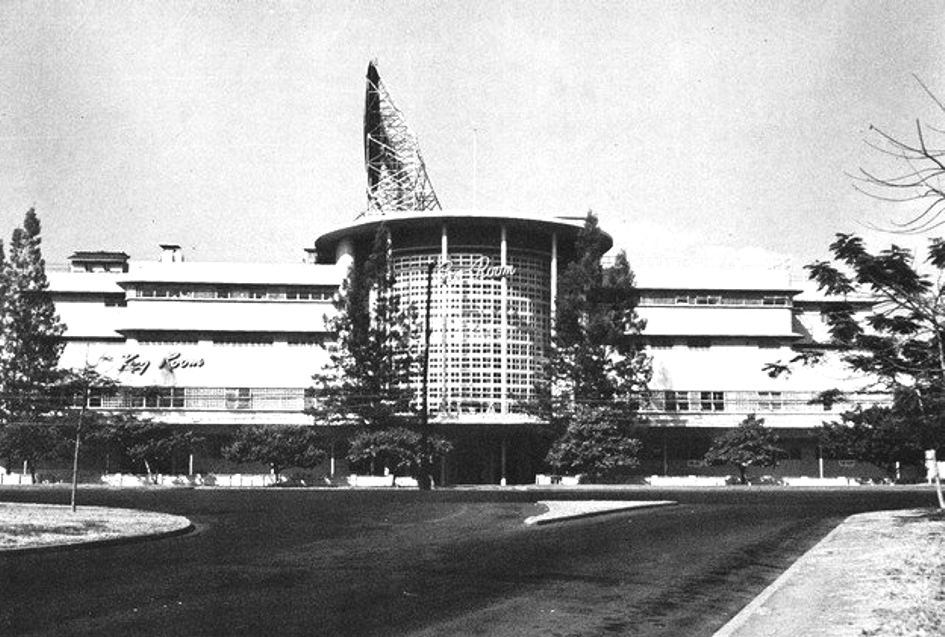
- Interactive map of the Manila Jai Alai Building area

General information
- Architectural style: Streamline Moderne
- Location: Taft Avenue, Ermita, Manila
- Coordinates: 14°35′5″N 120°59′3″E
- Construction started: 1939
- Completed: 1940
- Demolished: July 15, 2000

Technical details
- Floor count: four

Design and construction
- Architect: Welton Becket

The Manila Jai Alai Building was a building designed by American architects Welton Becket and Walter Wurdeman that functioned as a building for which jai alai games were held. It was built in the Streamline Moderne style in 1940 and survived the Battle of Manila. It was considered as the finest Art Deco building in Asia, until its demolition. It was demolished in 2000 upon the orders of the Mayor of Manila Lito Atienza amidst protests, to make way for the Manila Hall of Justice, which was never built.

== Design ==
The building was located adjacent to the old Legislative Building now the National Museum of Fine Arts. Composed of four storeys, the building's Sky Room was "the place to be seen" in its day. The building's cylindrical glass facade was meant to evoke the velocity of the game, which was then a craze in the city. The building was damaged during the Battle of Manila during World War II but was repaired.

== Decline ==
While the Sky Room became a venue of meetings and receptions during the Commonwealth and early years after Independence, the building had degenerated into a place of game-rigging, syndication and other forms of cheating. Several murders have been said to have occurred there, as disputes on gambling on the results of jai alai games were prevalent. In 1986, the game per se was banned in the country due to allegations of game fixing.

== Demolition ==
When Lito Atienza was elected Mayor of Manila in 1998, he immediately undertook several urban renewal projects in the city. One of the targets was the demolition of the now decrepit Jai-Alai Building. The vicinity had been taken over by vagrants, and the games transferred to Harrison Plaza in Malate, Manila. An effort by the National Commission for Culture and the Arts (NCCA), the National Historical Institute (NHI), the Heritage Conservation Society and other heritage conservationists opposed the demolition. Atienza, a frequent bettor on jai alai in his youth, would replace the building with a new building for the city's courts. The conservationists attempted to at least save the building's facade, but were rejected since aside from being inconsistent with the intended function as a court and the building's association with gambling, the facade would be incompatible with the new building's neoclassical style.

== Post-demolition ==
The Government Service Insurance System (GSIS) was given the lot where the building once stood in 2005. The new building for city's courts, on the other hand, will be built on the site of the old GSIS building near Manila City Hall along Arroceros street, beside SM City Manila. On August 22, 2012, there was a ground-breaking ceremony for a new House of Justice hall on the lot with the GSIS old building, the eighth such ceremony. Actual construction has not begun as bidding for the engineering, design and construction had not taken place yet.

The demolition led to the passage of the National Cultural Heritage Act of 2009 and other efforts to preserve historic buildings, which has had mixed results.

The vacant lot behind the building became the site of the Torre de Manila, which was completed in 2019. It became controversial in itself because of the building being in the sightline of the Rizal Monument.
