= James Barbers =

Filipino retired policeman and politician (1924–2019)

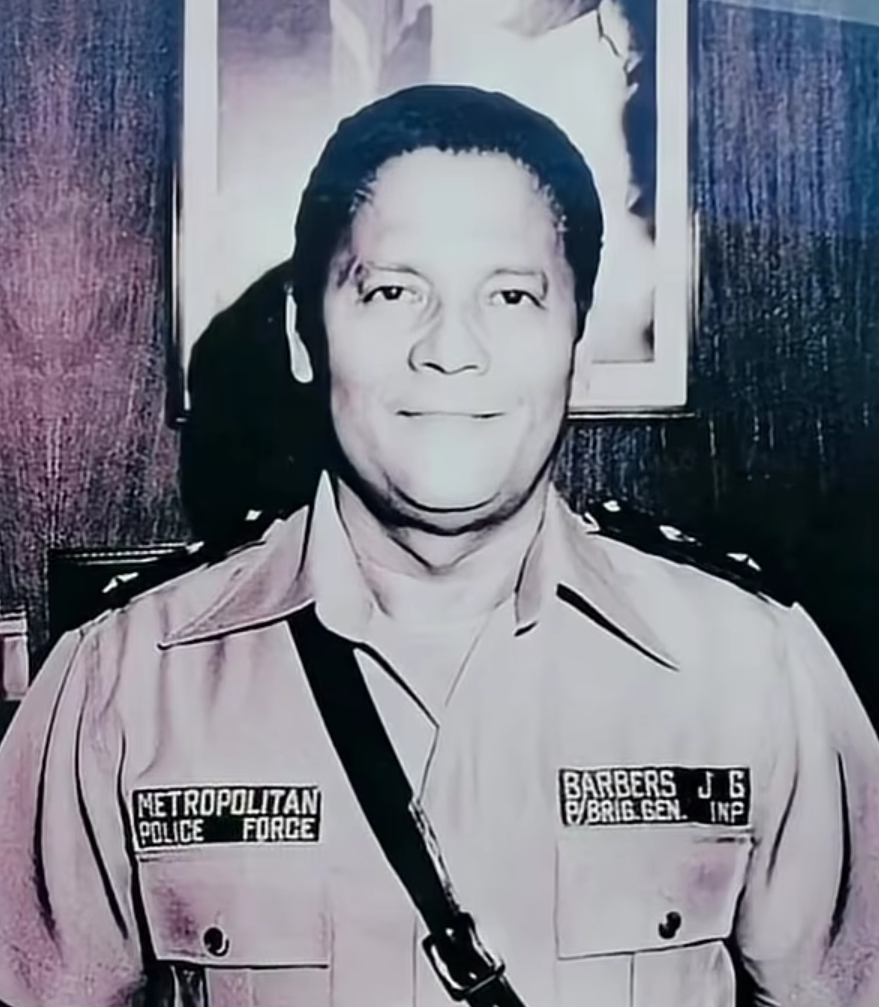
- Barbers in 1974

24th Vice Mayor of Manila
- In office January 1, 1978 – March 26, 1986
- Mayor: Ramon Bagatsing
- Preceded by: Atty. Martin B. Isidro, Sr.
- Succeeded by: Bambi M. Ocampo

District Director of Western Police District
- In office December 20, 1974 – 1978; Acting September 17 – December 20, 1974
- Preceded by: Gerardo G. Tamayo
- Succeeded by: PBGen. Pedro F. de la Paz

Personal details
- Born: James Guerrero Barbers; January 19, 1924 Cabugao, Ilocos Sur, Philippines
- Died: July 13, 2019 (aged 95)
- Resting place: Loyola Memorial Park
- Party: KBL (1978–1987, 1991–92)
- Other political affiliations: Liberal (1988–1991); Nacionalista (1987)
- Relatives: Robert Barbers (nephew)
- Occupation: Politician
- Profession: Police officer
- Police career
- Service: Philippine Constabulary; Integrated National Police
- Allegiance: Philippines
- Divisions: Western Police District
- Rank: Police Brigadier General

James Guerrero Barbers (January 19, 1924 – July 13, 2019) was a Filipino police officer and politician who served as the 23rd Vice Mayor of Manila.

== Early life ==
He was born in Cabugao, Ilocos Sur to a Filipina mother and an American father who was a soldier from the Barbieri clan from Sicily, Italy.

== Police career ==
Barbers served in the police force and notably for Western Police District as police chief. He then served as Vice Mayor of Manila from 1978 until 1986. He served as Manila deputy police chief, with the rank of police colonel, by the mid-1960s. During his term as Manila police chief, he was chief of security to then First Lady and Metro Manila governor Imelda Marcos.

== Political career ==
In July 1987, sources, particularly from the National Intelligence Coordinating Agency reported that former Assemblyman Rafael Recto allegedly conspired with Barbers and a group of military officers in a coup plot against the Aquino administration. Both denied involvement.

Barbers ran for senator under Kilusang Bagong Lipunan in 1992. He also joined the said party during the presidency of Ferdinand Marcos.

In 1987, Barbers (a retired police general; former vice mayor, WPD superintendent) ran for representative of the third district of Manila under the united opposition, Nacionalista–Grand Alliance for Democracy; but later lost to Leonardo Fugoso of the Liberal Party (Liberal)–Salonga Wing, prompting an electoral protest wherein he accused the board of canvassers of "hastily" proclaiming the winner.

Later that year, Barbers was among those who later defected to the administration camp, and was later proclaimed by Jovito Salonga, then president of both the Senate and the Liberal as their official candidate for vice mayor of Manila in the 1988 elections.

In late March 1996, Barbers was elected member of the board of directors of BF Homes Inc., and also became the senior vice president.

== Personal life ==
He is married to Blanchie Barbers.

He was the uncle of Robert Barbers who was a police colonel, interior secretary and legislator.

Barbers died on July 13, 2019 at the age of 95.
