= Manila's at-large congressional district =

Legislative district of the Philippines

- Former constituency for the Malolos Congress, National Assembly of the Philippines and Batasang Pambansa
- Administrative entity: Manila Province (1898–1901); City of Greater Manila (1943–1945); City of Manila (1984–1986)
- Region: Metro Manila (1984–1986)

Former constituency
- Created: 1898 (first creation); 1943 (second creation); 1984 (third creation)
- Abolished: 1901 (first abolition); 1945 (second abolition); 1986 (third abolition)

Manila's at-large congressional district may refer to three occasions when a city-wide or provincewide at-large district was used for elections to the various Philippine national legislatures from Manila.

From 1898 to 1901, four representatives from the province of Manila who were elected at-large sat in the Malolos Congress, the National Assembly of the First Philippine Republic. In 1901, the province was abolished and incorporated into the new province of Rizal, while the city remained intact. Both later elected their representatives from two districts each. From 1943 to 1944, the city of greater Manila as a whole sent two representatives to the National Assembly of the Second Philippine Republic. Multiple district representation was restored in the city in 1945. In 1978, regional at-large assembly districts were created for the national parliament with Manila included in the 21-seat Region IV's at-large district. The city returned to its own single multi-member at-large district in 1984 with a six-seat delegation for the Regular Batasang Pambansa of the Fourth Philippine Republic.

After 1986, Manila elected its representatives from its six congressional districts.

== List of members representing the district ==
=== Malolos Congress (1898–1901) ===
Seat A					Seat B					Seat C					Seat D					Legislature	Constituency
Portrait	Member (Lifespan)	Term of office	Party	Electoral history	Portrait	Member (Lifespan)	Term of office	Party	Electoral history	Portrait	Member (Lifespan)	Term of office	Party	Electoral history	Portrait	Member (Lifespan)	Term of office	Party	Electoral history	Legislature	Constituency
District created June 18, 1898.
	Arsenio Cruz Herrera (1863–1917)	September 15, 1898 – March 23, 1901	Nonpartisan	Elected in 1898.		Félix Ferrer Pascual	September 15, 1898 – March 23, 1901	Nonpartisan	Elected in 1898.		Teodoro Gonzales Leaño (1865–1944)	September 15, 1898 – March 23, 1901	Nonpartisan	Elected in 1898.		Mariano Limjap (1856–1926)	September 15, 1898 – March 23, 1901	Nonpartisan	Elected in 1898.	Malolos Congress	1898–1901; Caloocan, Dilao, Ermita, Las Piñas, Malate, Malibay, Manila, Mariquina, Montalban, Muntinlupa, Navotas, Novaliches, Pandacan, Parañaque, Pasig, Pateros, Pineda, San Felipe Neri, San Juan del Monte, San Mateo, San Pedro Macati, Santa Ana, Taguig, Tambobong
District dissolved into Manila's 1st, 2nd, Rizal's 1st, and 2nd districts for the Philippine Assembly.

=== National Assembly (1935–1944) ===
==== Second Republic ====
Seat A					Seat B					Legislature	Constituency
Portrait	Member (Lifespan)	Term of office	Party	Electoral history	Portrait	Member (Lifespan)	Term of office	Party	Electoral history	Legislature	Constituency
District re-created September 7, 1943.
	Alfonso E. Mendoza (1886–1947)	September 25, 1943 – February 2, 1944	KALIBAPI	Elected in 1943.		León Guinto (1886–1962)	September 25, 1943 – February 2, 1944	KALIBAPI	Appointed as an ex officio member. (Note: As Mayor of the City of Greater Manila.)	National Assembly (Second Republic)	1943–1944; City of Greater Manila (Note: Consists of present-day Caloocan, Makati, Mandaluyong, Manila, Parañaque, Pasay, Quezon City, and San Juan)
District dissolved into Manila's 1st, 2nd, Rizal's 1st, and 2nd districts for the House of Representatives.

=== Batasang Pambansa (1978–1986) ===
Seat A					Seat B					Seat C					Seat D					Seat E					Seat F					Legislature	Constituency
Portrait	Member (Lifespan)	Term of office	Party	Electoral history	Portrait	Member (Lifespan)	Term of office	Party	Electoral history	Portrait	Member (Lifespan)	Term of office	Party	Electoral history	Portrait	Member (Lifespan)	Term of office	Party	Electoral history	Portrait	Member (Lifespan)	Term of office	Party	Electoral history	Portrait	Member (Lifespan)	Term of office	Party	Electoral history	Legislature	Constituency
District re-created February 1, 1984.
	Lito Atienza (1941–)	June 30, 1984 – March 25, 1986	UNIDO	Elected in 1984.		Eva Estrada Kalaw (1920–2017)	June 30, 1984 – March 25, 1986	UNIDO	Elected in 1984.		Carlos C. Fernando	June 30, 1984 – March 25, 1986	UNIDO	Elected in 1984.		Mel Lopez (1926–1999)	June 30, 1984 – March 25, 1986	UNIDO	Elected in 1984.		Gonzalo Puyat II (1926–1999)	June 30, 1984 – March 25, 1986	UNIDO	Elected in 1984.		Arturo Tolentino (1926–1999)	June 30, 1984 – March 25, 1986	KBL	Elected in 1984.	Regular Batasang Pambansa	1984–1986; Manila
District dissolved into Manila's 1st, 2nd, 3rd, 4th, 5th, and 6th districts for the House of Representatives.

== See also ==
- Legislative districts of Manila
