= Lito Atienza =

Filipino politician (born 1941)

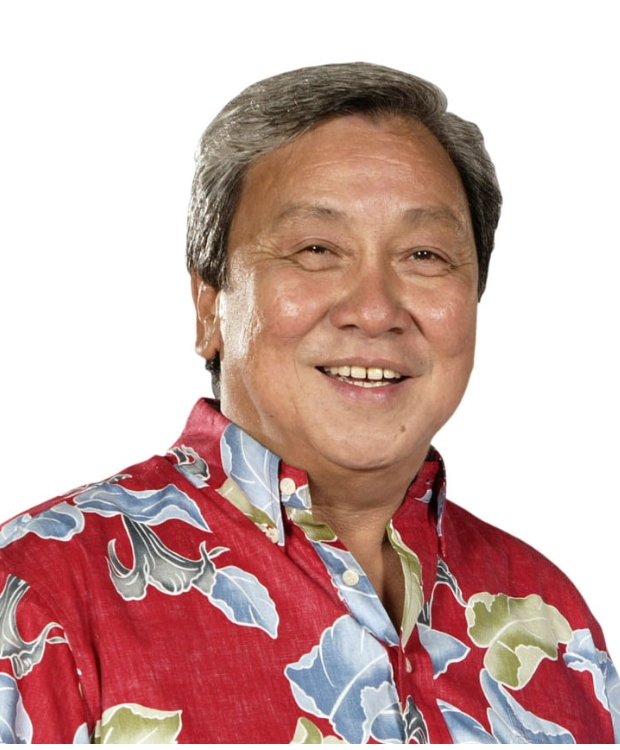
- Atienza in 2004

Deputy Speaker of the House of Representatives
- In office November 18, 2020 – June 30, 2022 Serving with several others
- House Speaker: Lord Allan Jay Velasco

Member of the Philippine House of Representatives for Buhay party-list
- In office June 30, 2013 – June 30, 2022

30th Secretary of Environment and Natural Resources
- In office July 18, 2007 – December 28, 2009
- President: Gloria Macapagal Arroyo
- Preceded by: Angelo Reyes
- Succeeded by: Horacio Ramos

24th Mayor of Manila
- In office March 27, 1998 – June 30, 2007; Officer-In-Charge from March 27 to June 30, 1998
- Vice Mayor: Ernesto Nieva (March 1998); Larry Silva (March – June 1998); Danny Lacuna (June 1998–2007)
- Preceded by: Alfredo Lim
- Succeeded by: Alfredo Lim

29th Vice Mayor of Manila
- In office June 30, 1992 – March 27, 1998
- Mayor: Alfredo Lim
- Preceded by: Ernesto Maceda Jr.
- Succeeded by: Ernesto Nieva

2nd General Manager of the National Housing Authority
- In office 1986–1987
- President: Corazon Aquino
- Preceded by: Gaudencio Tobias
- Succeeded by: Raymundo Dizon Jr.

Mambabatas Pambansa (Assemblyman) from Manila
- In office June 30, 1984 – March 25, 1986 Serving with Eva Estrada-Kalaw, Carlos Fernando, Mel Lopez, Gonzalo Puyat II, and Arturo Tolentino

Personal details
- Born: Jose Livioko Atienza Jr. August 10, 1941 (age 85) San Andres, Manila, Philippine Commonwealth
- Party: Buhay (partylist; 2012–present)
- Other political affiliations: See list: PROMDI (2021–2024); PMP (2009–2012); Lakas (2007–2009); Liberal (1987–1991, 1998–2007); PRP (1991–1998); UNIDO (1984–1988)
- Spouse: Ma. Evelina Ilagan
- Children: 6 (including Kim, Ali, Maile and Chi)
- Education: University of Santo Tomas (BS)
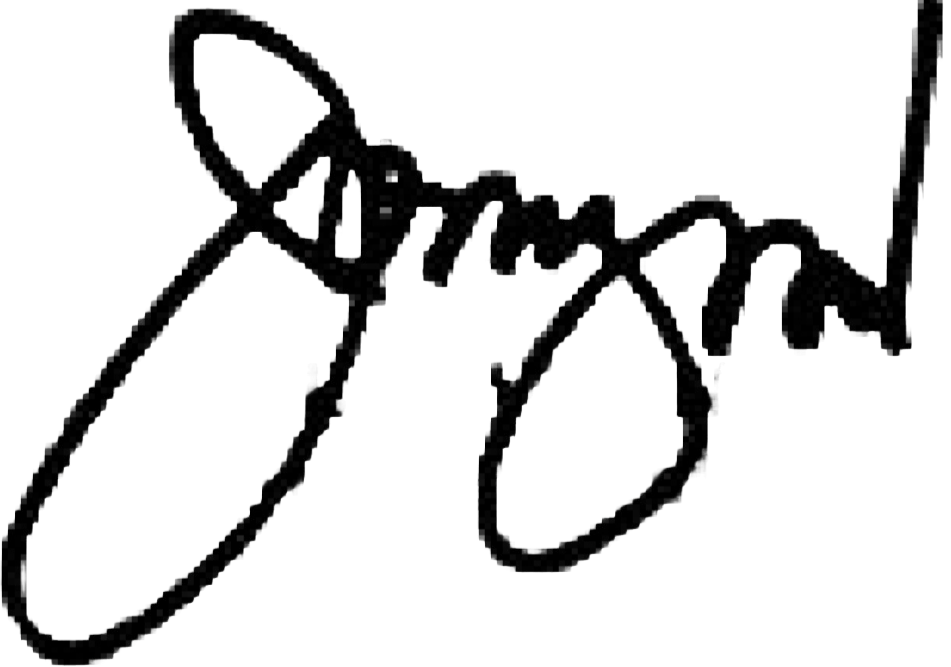
- Signature

Jose "Lito" Livioko Atienza Jr. (Tagalog: [ɐˈtʃɛnsa]; born August 10, 1941) is a Filipino politician who served as a 24th Mayor of Manila for three consecutive terms from 1998 to 2007, He also served as the 30th Secretary of Environment and Natural Resources from 2007 to 2009 in the Administration of President Gloria Macapagal Arroyo, and was Party-list Representative for Buhay from 2013 to 2022, as House Deputy Speaker from 2020 to 2022. He unsuccessfully ran for vice president of the Philippines in the 2022 elections as the running mate of Senator Manny Pacquiao.

Outside of politics, Atienza is known for hosting the drama anthology television series Maynila, which aired on GMA Network from 1999 to 2020.

== Early life and career ==
Atienza was born on August 10, 1941, in the San Andres Bukid district of Manila, four months before the outbreak of World War II. Atienza's father, Jose J. Atienza Sr., was a distinguished public servant to three Philippine presidents. An uncle, Hermenegildo Atienza, was a World War II guerrilla leader and after the war was appointed Military Mayor of Manila by Gen. Douglas MacArthur himself and one of the founders of the Liberal Party in 1946. Another uncle, Rigoberto Atienza, a World War II veteran, a victim of the Bataan Death March and former Philippine Army commanding general, became Chief of Staff of the Philippine Armed Forces in the 1960s during the term of President Diosdado Macapagal. A third uncle, Arturo, became a renowned lawyer. The four brothers were all members of the Hunters resistance against the Japanese occupation during World War II.

He took up his primary and secondary education from Ateneo de Manila University's Basic Education Unit and completed a Bachelor's Degree in Architecture from the University of Santo Tomas. His interest and degree in architecture proved useful in rehabilitating and renewing the City of Manila, which had fallen to decay over years of unmanaged growth in population and the lack of an urban planning & community development.

== Political career ==
Atienza started his political career in 1968 when he organized the Democratic Youth Movement. He was one of those who survived the Plaza Miranda bombing in 1971. After the 1971 elections, Atienza was hired by then Manila Mayor Ramon Bagatsing as chief information officer at the City Hall. He worked under Mayor Bagatsing for almost ten years. He later became a barangay captain in 1972, serving in this capacity for 10 years.

During Martial Law, Atienza was arrested twice for exposing human rights abuses under the dictatorship regime of President Ferdinand Marcos. He remained with the opposition even if he was on constant threat of incarceration for opposing Marcos. Atienza was first elected as Member of Parliament in the then At-large Congressional District of Manila under the Batasang Pambansa in 1984 and served until Marcos was peacefully ousted during the People Power Revolution of 1986.

Under the administration of President Corazon Aquino, Atienza was appointed general manager of the National Housing Authority (Philippines) in 1986 and he promoted low-cost housing for teachers and police officers.

Together with former Manila police general Alfredo Lim running for mayor, Atienza ran for vice mayor of Manila. The two defeated the incumbent slate of then-Mayor Mel Lopez. The tandem won a second term in 1995.

=== Manila mayorship ===
When Lim resigned to run for President of the Philippines in 1998, Atienza was elevated to mayor to finish Lim's second term. He won his first full term in 1998 and took his oath of office on June 24. After former president Joseph Estrada's arrest on April 25, 2001, Atienza claimed during a radio interview to have brought numerous Estrada supporters to the pro-Estrada rally at the EDSA Shrine, which preceded the May 1 riots caused by the rallyists' march to Malacañang Palace. Atienza was again re-elected in 2001 and finally in 2004. During his term as mayor, numerous heritage buildings in Manila were demolished, notably the Jai Alai Building, which used to be the best Art Deco building in all of Asia before its demolition.

The Supreme Court ruled on April 17, 2007, that Franklin Drilon was the real president of the Liberal Party and not Atienza and has approved the Daza-Drilon Amendments to the LP's Charter. It also ruled that all certificates of nomination signed by Atienza are worthless unless they moved to another political party like Batangas Governor Armando Sanchez and Manny Pacquiao, who moved to KAMPI, and Mike Defensor, who moved to Lakas-CMD, in February 2007. Voting 9–5, the court said the amended Salonga Constitution extended Drilon's term to November 2007. On July 16, 2007, the Supreme Court dismissed with finality a motion for consideration filed by Atienza (en banc resolution dated July 5, 2007). COMELEC earlier ruled that Drilon's term as LP president has already expired and called for the holding of elections to end the leadership vacuum in the country's oldest political party. The ruling came after the poll body invalidated the so-called "rump elections" of LP leaders in March 2006. On November 26, 2007, at Club Filipino, Greenhills, San Juan, LP National Executive Council officials resolved to appoint Senator Mar Roxas as president of the Liberal Party (Philippines). Corazon Aquino and Jovito Salonga, inter alia, signed the resolution. Roxas is to unite the two LP factions, and set the stage for his presidential campaign in the 2010 election. Atienza, however, questioned Roxas' appointment, attacking the composition of Liberal Party's National Executive Council (NECO) and alleged that the Supreme Court of the Philippines' June 5 resolution ordered the LP leadership's status quo maintenance.

In February 2007, Atienza formally and officially announced that his son, the Presidential Adviser on Youth Affairs and Manila's Chair of the Inner-City Development Committee, Arnold Atienza, would run for mayor of the city on May 14, 2007. Arnold Atienza lost the mayoralty race to Sen. Alfredo Lim, who was also a former mayor.

=== Environment Secretary ===
Atienza, a staunch supporter of President Gloria Macapagal Arroyo, was named Environment Secretary on July 18, 2007, replacing Angelo Reyes, who was moved to the Department of Energy after incumbent Raphael Lotilla resigned. Atienza's appointment came as a shock to environmental groups, who had dubbed him as the "butcher of Arroceros." As Manila mayor, Atienza in 2003 enraged environmentalists when he ordered the closure of the Arroceros Forest Park to give way to the building of an education office and a teacher's dormitory, sparking a lawsuit. The Kalikasan People's Network said that Atienza had no moral authority to be at the helm of the DENR because he had "neither had sterling qualifications nor a clean track record of protecting the environment as former Manila Mayor."

=== 2010 mayoralty bid ===
In 2010, Atienza ran for a comeback as Mayor of Manila under Pwersa ng Masang Pilipino, with Manila 6th district councilor Bonjay Isip-Garcia as his running mate for vice mayor. However, he lost to incumbent Mayor Alfredo Lim, who received 59.52% of the votes.

=== Representative ===
In 2013, Atienza became the representative of Buhay Partylist in the House of Representatives. He opposed the divorce bill and tried to oppose the anti-discrimination bill as well, but withdrew after seeing a massive backlash against him. He also opposes the department of culture bill and the civil union bill. Atienza supports the Philippine drug war, ironic since it is the complete opposite of his party's advocacies. Other moves he supports are the ₱1,000 budget for the Commission on Human Rights and the re-imposition of the death penalty. He also expressed his intent to campaign for the withdrawal of the reproductive (RH) law that was passed in 2013, or if not possible, he intends to minimize the funding of the law's programs. Atienza also supported the rejection of environment secretary Gina Lopez. Atienza is an investor in the mining industry in the Philippines, and has been blocking the national land use bill since his stint as representative.

=== 2022 vice presidential campaign ===
On October 1, 2021, Atienza filed his certificate of candidacy for Vice President for 2022 Philippine presidential election under PROMDI together with Senator Manny Pacquiao for President. Atienza underwent knee replacement surgery in February 2022 days after spraining his foot, making him unable to join Pacquiao in his campaign sorties, as well as the vice presidential debates. He lost the race with 270,381 votes, placing 5th behind Davao City Mayor Sara Duterte.

=== 2025 Congress comeback attempt ===
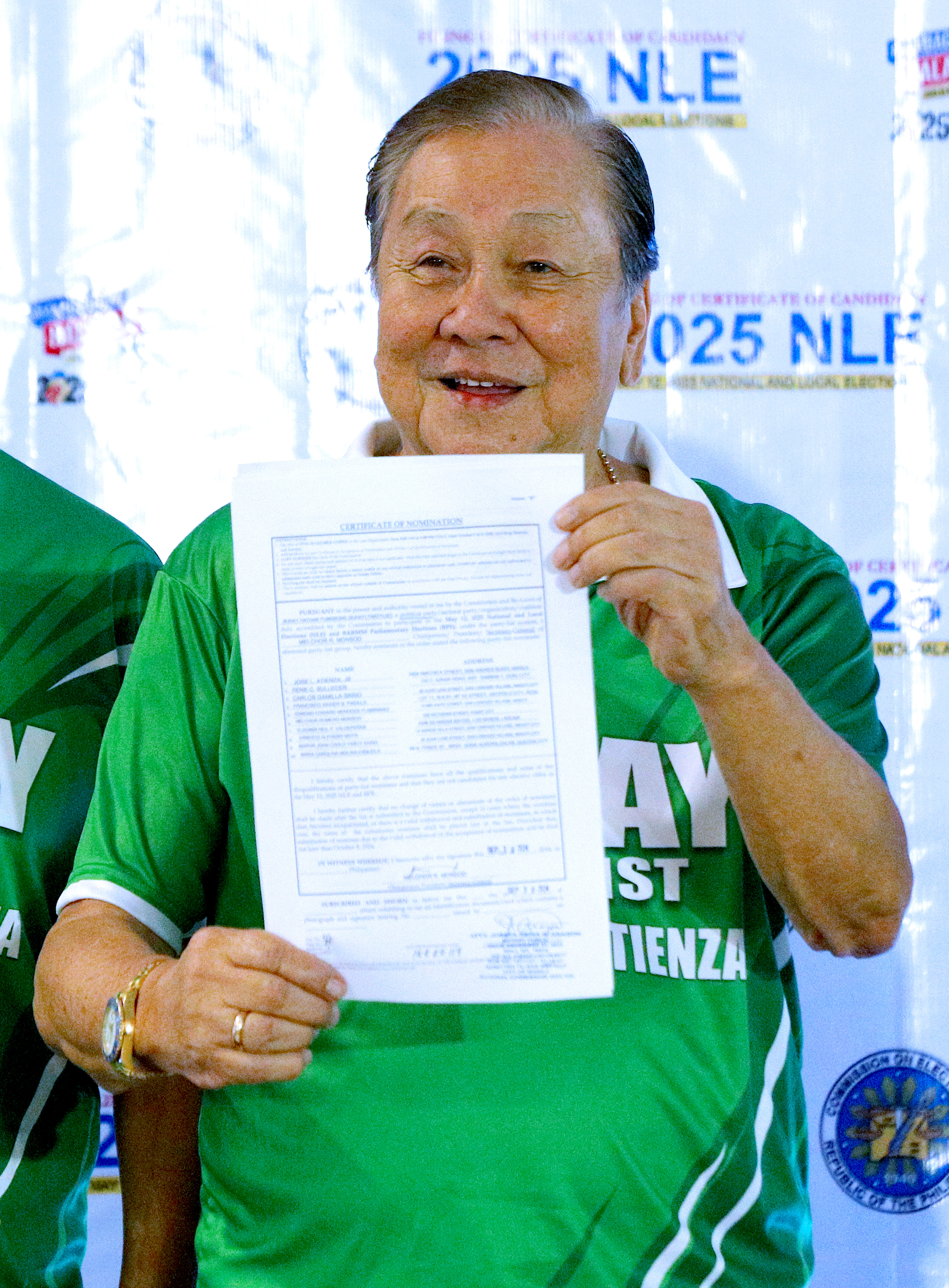
Atienza filing his Certificate of Nomination as a nominee for Buhay Party-List in October 2024

On October 1, 2024, Atienza, as the first nominee, led the Buhay Party-List in filing its certificate of nomination and acceptance for the 2025 Philippine House of Representatives elections. However, the party-list failed to secure a seat in the 20th Congress.

In Manila, Atienza endorsed the mayoral bid of former Mayor Isko Moreno, who is running with his daughter Chi Atienza as the vice mayoralty candidate in 2025.

== Leadership style ==
Atienza's leadership can be described into three aspects; (1) social and community development – where he focused on improving the welfare of senior citizens and of children, especially for abandoned children, (2) improving living conditions by improving government services and facilities, and (3) simplifying the bureaucracy in dealing with the city government of Manila.

=== Social development ===
In almost forty years of Atienza's political career, he has established social development projects such as the "Mahal Ko si Lolo, Mahal Ko si Lola" (transl. I Love My Grandfather, I Love My Grandmother) foundation in 1976, a model for today's Office of Senior Citizens Affairs (OSCA). In 1984, he also founded the "Kababaihan ng Maynila," (transl. The Women of Manila) a women's livelihood organization. In 1992 while serving as Vice-Mayor, he established the "Home for the Angels," a child care center for abandoned and abused infants.

=== Community development ===
In the areas of urban renewal for the City of Manila, Atienza implemented the "Buhayin ang Maynila" (transl. Revive Manila) program, renovating most of Manila's decaying public facilities such as lighting and improving the sidewalk by the Manila Bay along Roxas Boulevard and the area is now filled with al fresco restaurants and coffee shops. Public places such as the Plaza Miranda, the Andres Bonifacio monument, Rajah Sulayman, the Binondo areas, the creation of a Linear-Park in Pandacan, renovating Carriedo and the R. Hidalgo streets in Santa Cruz, upgrading services of the city's public libraries, schools and hospitals including the Ospital ng Maynila and the building a permanent campus for the Universidad de Manila are among the achievements under Atienza's administration.

== Advocacies and issues ==
Atienza is a devout Roman Catholic and under his administration, he pursued programs that were "Pro-Life" and opposed any forms of campaign or programs that promoted contraception or abortion, or sex education programs. All of the city's health centers do not promote "family planning" programs involving contraception. He and his wife founded the Home for the Angels.

Atienza's urban renewal programs also faced certain controversies when he decided to build a new campus for the Universidad de Manila, (formerly called City College of Manila) on the historical Mehan Gardens. Environmentalists and historians were opposed to the project stating that Mehan Gardens should remain as an open space, one of the few remaining open spaces in the City of Manila and for historical reasons, with the gardens an untapped archaeological resource that dates back to the time of the Spanish colonial era.

Historians also questioned Atienza's respect for historical architecture when the mayor ordered the demolition of the Manila Jai Alai Building along Taft Avenue to give way to the envisioned Hall of Justice to house the city's regional trial courts. The building, built during the American colonial period was one of the last remaining art-deco style buildings that survived World War II.

The mayor battled the country's three major oil companies, the partly state-owned and Saudi Aramco managed Petron, Dutch-owned Pilipinas Shell and Caltex-Chevron. Atienza and the Manila City Council decreed that the presence of oil distribution depots in the heavily populated district of Pandacan poised as a security and safety danger and issued an eviction notice to the oil companies. The concern was raised after the terror attacks that started on September 11, 2001, that destroyed the World Trade Center in New York. Atienza and the council decreed that the Pandacan district was to be converted from an industrial zone to a residential-commercial zone. A moratorium was set and the oil companies have agreed to gradually scale down their operations.

During the second week of December 2006, Atienza, in his show of commitment to "Pro-Life," terminated the Commander of the Manila Police District (MPD) detachment in Quiapo district for failing to rid the area of herbalists who are supposedly selling concoctions that induce abortion.

Atienza had been severely criticized by cultural activists for his heavy-handed decision to demolish the famed Jai-Alai Building along Taft Avenue, designed by Hollywood architect Welton Beckett. One of the finest edifices of art deco "streamline-moderne" in the world was destroyed unheeded by the mayor.

Barely days after Atienza stepped down from office, his successor, Mayor Alfredo Lim reversed several of the former's civil works projects such as the removal of the promenade along Rizal Avenue and the closure of the cafe and bars along the Roxas Boulevard Baywalk. In a separate development, the former Vice-Mayor Danny Lacuna accused Atienza of selling out the property allocated for the Jose Abad Santos High School in the district of Binondo.

== Other ventures ==
Atienza hosted the Philippine television drama romance anthology, Maynila, broadcast by GMA Network from December 13, 1999 (a year after he became Mayor of Manila) until its hiatus on August 1, 2020, due to the implementation of the modified enhanced community quarantine (MECQ) in Metro Manila amid the surge of COVID-19 cases in the region, where sometimes he acted for some cameo role, who gives advice to the characters.

In 2002, Atienza, through the Metro Manila Mayors League, collaborated with children's cable channel Cartoon Network in a civic project entitled "Cartoon Network Mayors' Awards of Excellence" where youths aged 10 to 16 were nominated and awarded for their exemplary contributions to the community. Atienza appeared in a series of advertisements alongside the Mayor of Townsville from The Powerpuff Girls to promote the campaign.

== Personal life ==
Atienza is married to Ma. Evelina Ilagan with six children, including TV host and former councilor Kim Atienza athlete-turned-newscaster Ali Atienza, Manila 3rd district councilor Maile Atienza and Manila vice mayor Chi Atienza-Valdepeñas. The couple's sons Kim and Ali are also former councilors from the 5th district.

== Electoral history ==
Electoral history of Lito Atienza
Year	Office	Party	Votes received				Result
Year	Office	Party	Total	%	P.	Swing	Result
1984	Mambabatas Pambansa (Assemblyman) from Manila	UNIDO	363,505	—N/a	6th	—N/a	Won
1992	Vice Mayor of Manila	PRP	245,420	45.36%	1st	—N/a	Won
1995	Vice Mayor of Manila	PRP	285,984	48.92%	1st	+3.56	Won
1988	Mayor of Manila	Liberal	136,707	—N/a	2nd	—N/a	Lost
1998	Mayor of Manila	Liberal	197,476	29.67%	1st	—N/a	Won
2001	Mayor of Manila	Liberal	255,021	43.81%	1st	+14.14	Won
2004	Mayor of Manila	Liberal	455,302	67.46%	1st	+23.65	Won
2010	Mayor of Manila	PMP	181,094	27.22%	2nd	-40.24	Lost
2013	Representative (Party-list)	Buhay	1,255,808	4.62%	1st	—N/a	Won
2016	Representative (Party-list)	Buhay	760,912	2.35%	9th	-2.27	Won
2019	Representative (Party-list)	Buhay	361,493	1.30%	20th	-0.97	Won
2025	Representative (Party-list)	Buhay	99,365	0.24%	107th	-1.06	Lost
2022	Vice President of the Philippines	PROMDI	270,381	0.52%	5th	—N/a	Lost

Political offices
Preceded by Ernesto Maceda Jr.	Vice Mayor of Manila; 1992–1998	Succeeded by Ernesto Nieva
Preceded by Alfredo Lim	Mayor of Manila; 1998–2007	Succeeded by Alfredo Lim
Preceded by Angelo Reyes	Secretary of Environment and Natural Resources; 2007–2009	Succeeded by Eleazar Quinto
Party political offices
Preceded by Alfredo Lim	Liberal nominee for Mayor of Manila; 1998, 2001, 2004	Succeeded by Ali Atienza
Preceded by Alfredo Lim	PMP nominee for Mayor of Manila; 2010	Succeeded by Joseph Estrada
Vacant Title last held by Ismael Sueno	PROMDI nominee for Vice President of the Philippines; 2022	Most recent
