= Mariano Limjap =

Filipino revolutionary (1856–1926)

Member of the Malolos Congress from Manila
- In office September 15, 1898 – November 13, 1899 Serving with Félix Ferrer Pascual, Teodoro Gonzales Leaño and Arsenio Cruz Herrera

Personal details
- Born: October 19, 1856
- Died: March 4, 1926 (aged 69)
- Resting place: Manila North Cemetery
- Spouse: María Escolar
- Children: Esperanza Limjap-Osmeña
- Occupation: Businessman, philanthropist, nationalist, revolutionary
- Known for: Member of the Katipunan; financier of La Liga Filipina

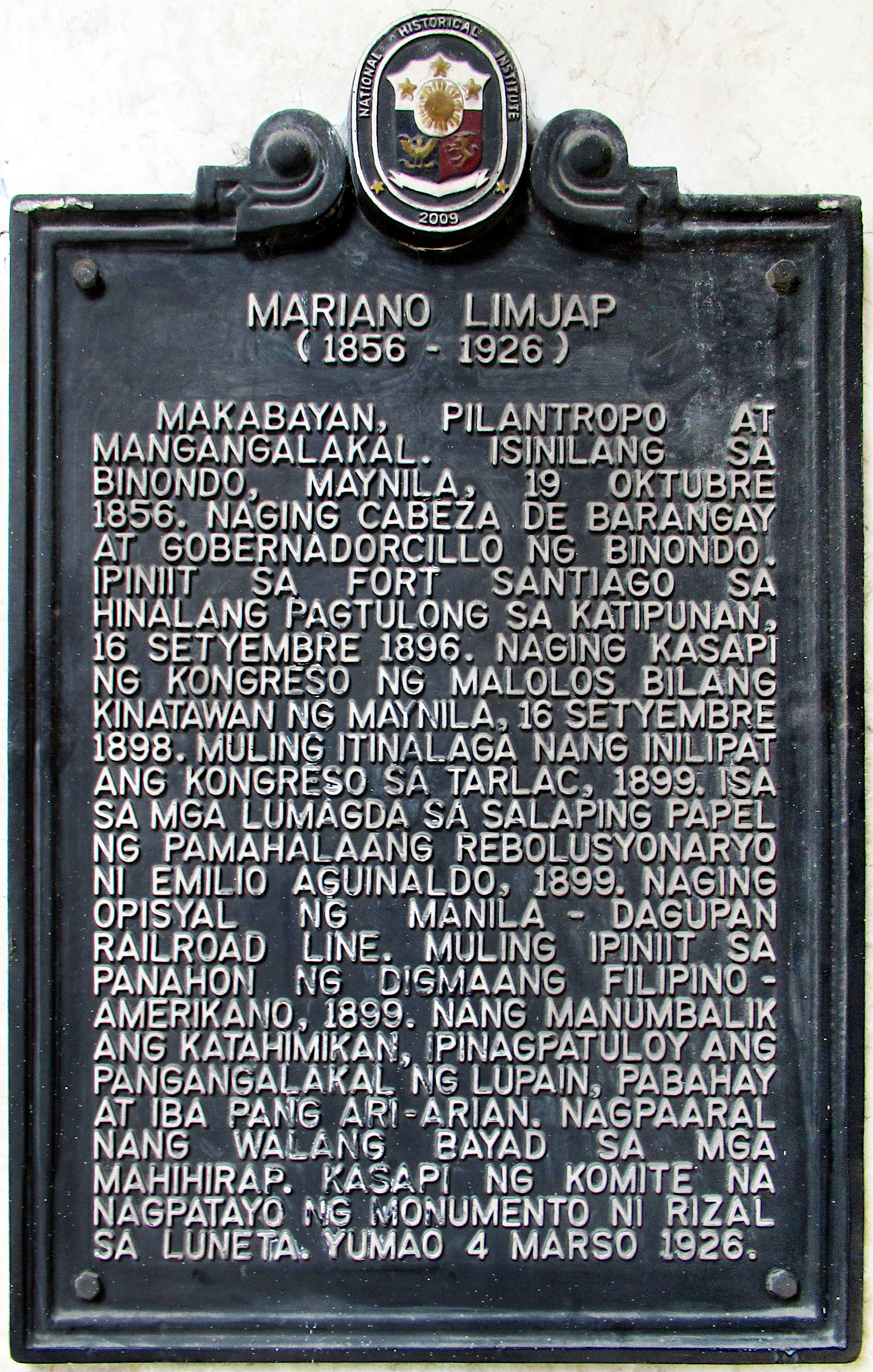
National historical marker installed in 2009 at the [Equitable Bank Building in Binondo, Manila

Mariano Limjap y Nolasco (October 19, 1856 – March 4, 1926) was a Filipino revolutionary who was part of the Katipunan. He was also a financier of La Liga Filipina. He was a businessman (considered one of the best in the country), philanthropist, and nationalist. He was incarcerated by the Spanish for funding the Manila battalion. During the Malolos Congress, he was one of the four elected members from Manila. After the Philippine–American War, he was included in the committee for the creation of a Rizal monument in Luneta as decreed by Act No. 243, approved by the United States Philippine Commission.

His daughter, Esperanza Limjap became the wife of Philippine President Sergio Osmeña and was the fourth First Lady of the Philippines.
