= Legislative districts of Manila =

Legislative district of the Philippines

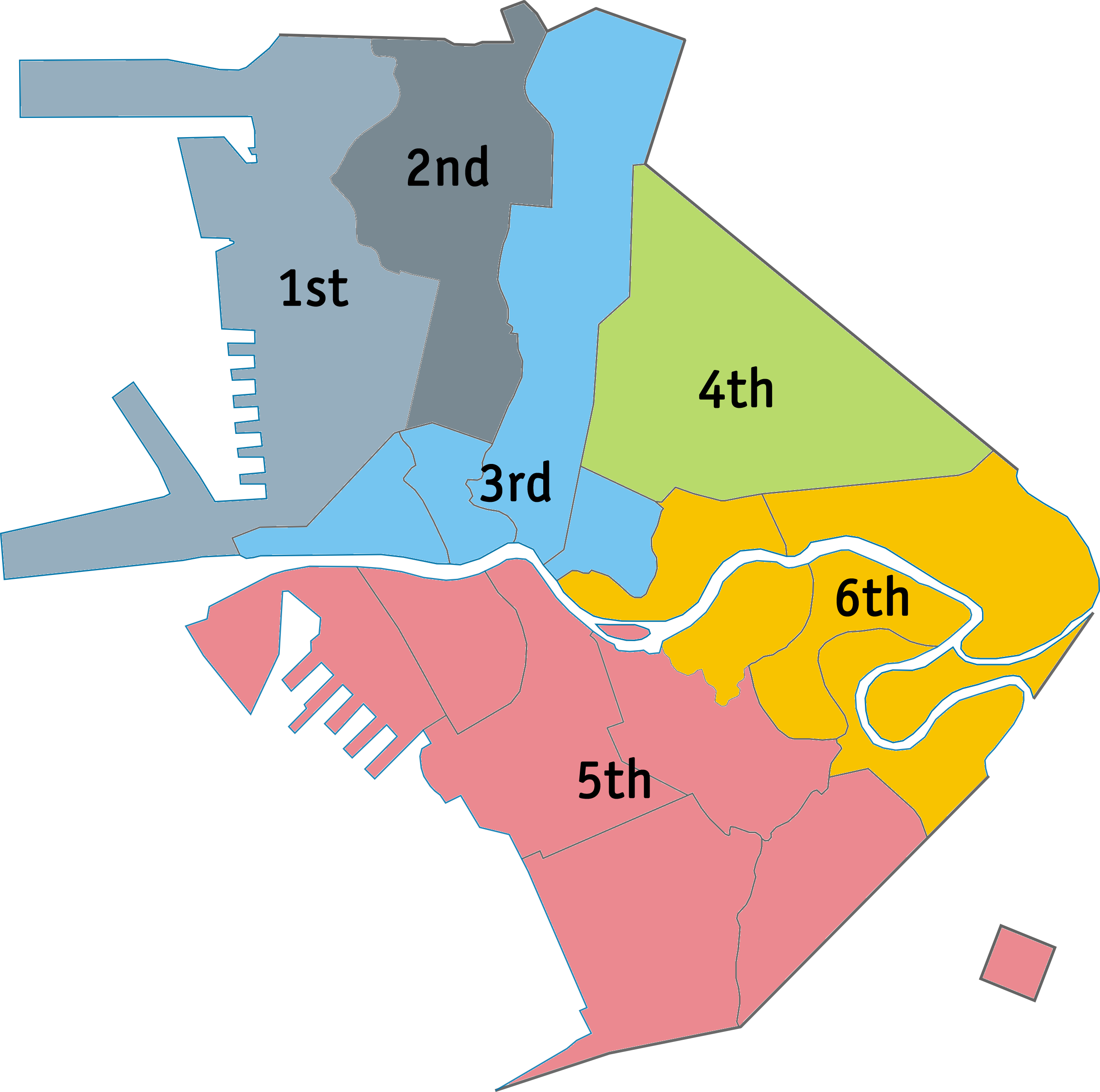
Legislative districts of Manila

The highly urbanized city of Manila is currently represented in the House of Representatives of the Philippines by its six congressional districts. Every three years, each district elects one representative who will sit on their behalf in Congress. In addition, each district is allotted six seats in the Manila City Council, with councilors being elected every three years.

== History ==
Areas now under the jurisdiction of Manila were initially represented as part of the at-large district of the province of Manila in the Malolos Congress from 1898 to 1899; the district elected four representatives.

The city of Manila, chartered in 1901, first gained separate representation in 1907. It was initially divided into two representative districts from 1907 to 1949. When seats for the upper house of the Philippine Legislature were elected from territory-based districts between 1916 and 1935, the city formed part of the fourth senatorial district which elected two out of the 24-member Senate.

In the disruption caused by the Second World War, Manila was incorporated into the City of Greater Manila on January 1, 1942, through Manuel Quezon's Executive Order No. 400 as a wartime emergency measure. Greater Manila was represented by two delegates in the National Assembly of the Japanese-sponsored Second Philippine Republic: one was the city mayor (an ex officio member), while the other was elected through a citywide assembly of KALIBAPI members during the Japanese occupation of the Philippines.

Upon the restoration of the Philippine Commonwealth in 1945, Manila's pre-war two-district representation was retained; this remained so until 1949. By virtue of the Revised Charter of the City of Manila, enacted on June 18, 1949, the city was divided into four congressional districts. The city elected four representatives from the 2nd Congress up to the 7th Congress.

The city was represented in the Interim Batasang Pambansa as part of Region IV from 1978 to 1984, and elected six representatives, at large, to the Regular Batasang Pambansa in 1984.

Manila was reapportioned into six congressional districts under the new Constitution which was proclaimed on February 11, 1987. It elected members to the restored House of Representatives starting that same year.

== Current districts ==
The city was last apportioned upon the proclamation of the 1987 Constitution, where it was granted six seats in Congress. The city's current congressional delegation composes of five members of the National Unity Party, and one member of the Nationalist People's Coalition; five members are also members of the Asenso Manileño local party. All six representatives are part of the majority bloc in the 20th Congress.

Legislative districts and representatives of Manila
District	Current Representative	Party		Constituent LGUs	Area	Population (2020)	Map
District	Current Representative	Local	National	Constituent LGUs	Area	Population (2020)	Map
1st	Ernesto M. Dionisio Jr. (since 2022)		NUP	List: Western Tondo; 1-146	4.57 km^{2}	441,282	
2nd	Rolando M. Valeriano (since 2019)	Asenso Manileño	NUP	List: Gagalangin; 147-267	4.08 km^{2}	212,938	
3rd	Joel R. Chua (since 2022)	Asenso Manileño	NUP	List: Binondo, Quiapo, San Nicolas, Santa Cruz; 268-394	6.24 km^{2}	220,029	
4th	Giselle Mary L. Maceda (since 2025)	Asenso Manileño	NPC	List: Sampaloc; 395-586	5.14 km^{2}	388,305	
5th	William Irwin C. Tieng (since 2022)	Asenso Manileño	NUP	List: Ermita, Intramuros, Malate, Port Area, San Andres, south Paco; including Manila South Cemetery; 649-828	11.56 km^{2}	395,065	
6th	Bienvenido M. Abante Jr. (since 2019)	Asenso Manileño	NUP	List: north Paco, Pandacan, San Miguel, Santa Ana, Santa Mesa; 587-648; 829-905	7.79 km^{2}	300,186	

== At-large (defunct) ==
=== 1898–1899 ===
- encompasses Manila province

Period	Representatives
Malolos Congress; 1898–1899	Teodoro Gonzales Leaño
Malolos Congress; 1898–1899	Felix Ferrer y Pascual
Malolos Congress; 1898–1899	Arsenio Cruz Herrera
Malolos Congress; 1898–1899	Mariano Limjap

=== 1943–1944 ===
- includes Quezon City and the following municipalities from Rizal: Caloocan, Makati, Mandaluyong, Parañaque, Pasay, San Juan

Period	Representatives
National Assembly; 1943–1944	Leon G. Guinto (ex officio)
National Assembly; 1943–1944	Alfonso E. Mendoza

=== 1984–1986 ===
Period	Representatives
Regular Batasang Pambansa; 1984–1986	Jose L. Atienza Jr.
Regular Batasang Pambansa; 1984–1986	Eva Estrada-Kalaw
Regular Batasang Pambansa; 1984–1986	Carlos C. Fernandez
Regular Batasang Pambansa; 1984–1986	Gemiliano C. Lopez Jr.
Regular Batasang Pambansa; 1984–1986	Gonzalo G. Puyat II
Regular Batasang Pambansa; 1984–1986	Arturo M. Tolentino
