= 1988 Manila local elections =

8th Mayoral election in the City of Manila

1988 Manila mayoral election
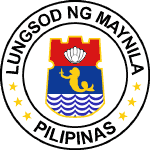
- January 18, 1988
Candidate	Mel Lopez	Lito Atienza
Party	PDP–Laban	Liberal
Running mate	Danny Lacuna	James Barbers
Popular vote	238,156	136,707
Mayor before election
Gregorio Ejercito (OIC)
Independent
Elected mayor
Mel Lopez
PDP–Laban
- Vice mayoral election
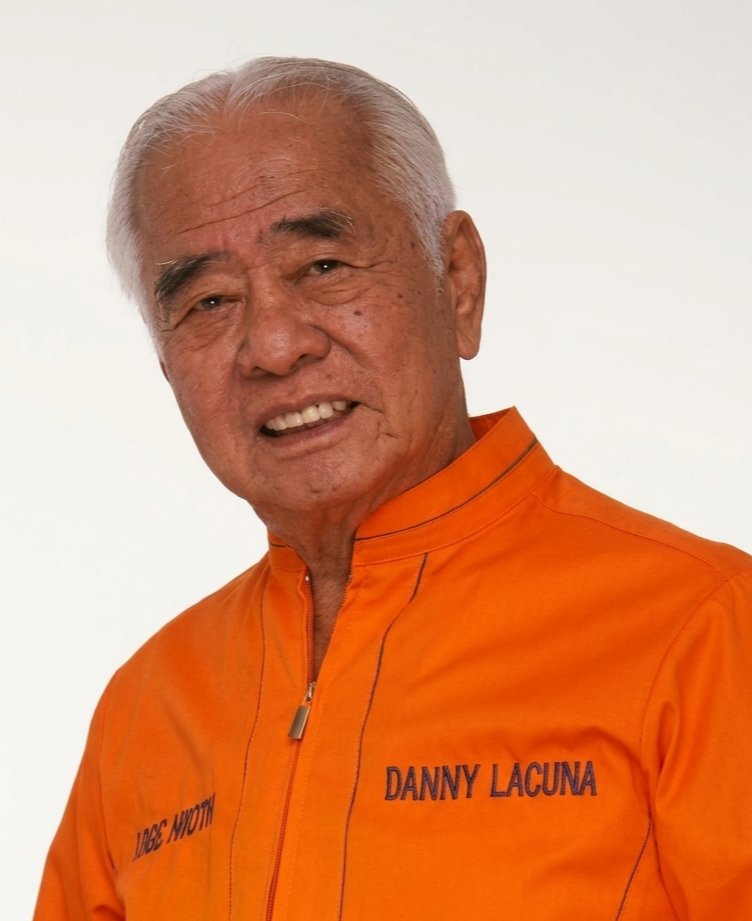

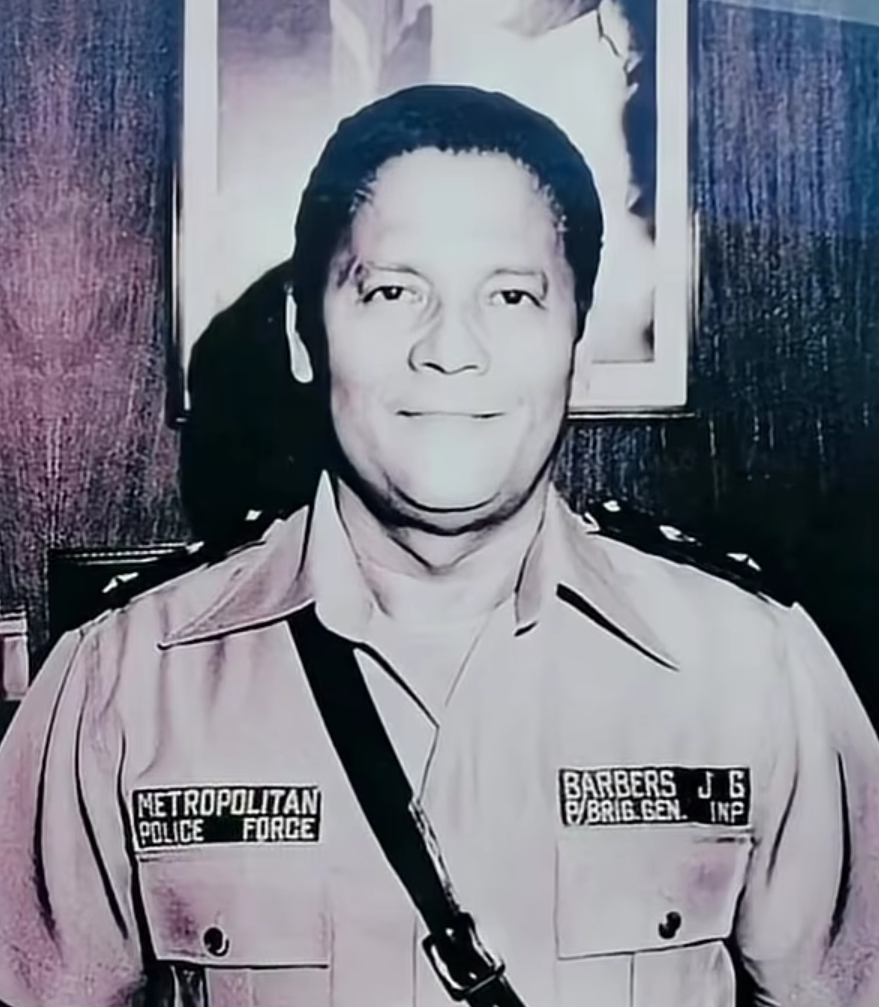
Candidate	Danny Lacuna	James Barbers
Party	PDP–Laban	Liberal
Popular vote	244,445	180,676
Vice Mayor before election
Ernesto A. Nieva
Independent
Elected Vice Mayor
Danny Lacuna
PDP–Laban

Local elections was held in the City of Manila on January 18, 1988, within the Philippine local elections after the passing of 1987 constitution. The voters elected for the elective local posts in the city: the mayor, vice mayor, and the councilors, six in each of the city's six legislative districts.

Mel Lopez, the mayor from 1986 to 1987 was affected of mass forced resignation order by President Cory Aquino on local government chiefs. Lopez served as OIC until 1987, when Gregorio Ejercito is appointed.

Mel Lopez faced former assemblyman Lito Atienza, and Lopez defeated Atienza with over 50,000 votes lead. Danny Lacuna, former city councilor and former acting vice mayor won against former vice mayor James Barbers.

== Results ==
=== For Mayor ===
Former OIC mayor Mel Lopez won against former NHA general manager Lito Atienza, former senator Eva Estrada Kalaw and former assemblyman Gerardo Espina Sr.

Manila mayoral election
Party	Candidate	Votes	%
PDP–Laban	Mel Lopez	238,156	
Liberal	Lito Atienza (Salonga wing)	136,707	
Liberal	Eva Estrada Kalaw (Kalaw wing)		
KBL	Gerardo Espina Sr.		
Total votes			100.00
PDP–Laban gain from Liberal			

=== For Vice Mayor ===
Former acting vice mayor and former Councilor Danny Lacuna won against former vice mayor James Barbers and former councilor Chito Lucero.

Manila vice mayoral election
Party	Candidate	Votes	%
PDP–Laban	Danny Lacuna	244,445	
Liberal	James Barbers (Salonga wing)	180,676	
Liberal	Chito Lucero (Kalaw wing)		
Total votes			100.00
PDP–Laban gain from Liberal			

=== For Councilors ===
In the councilors, the following are elected:

- 1st district:
1. Reynaldo "Rene" Jose (Liberal)
2. Abraham Cabochan
3. Ernesto "Dionix" Dionisio Sr.
4. Alberto Domingo
5. Ernesto Nieva
6. Pedro Alfonso
- 2nd district:
1. Nestor Ponce
2. Francisco Varona
3. Flaviano Concepcion Jr.
4. Romeo Rivera (Liberal)
5. Humberto Basco
6. Romualdo Maranan
- 3rd district:
1. Alex Co
2. Saturnino Herrera
3. Susana Ong
4. Pedro "Pete" de Jesus
5. Nemesio Garcia
6. Bernardito Ang
- 4th district:
1. Ernesto Maceda Jr.
2. Jaime de la Rosa (Liberal)
3. Victoriano "Vic" Melendez
4. Emilio Bonoan (Independent)
5. Eduardo Quintos V (Liberal)
6. Rolando Nieto
- 5th district:
1. Rufino Bunsoy
2. Ponciano Subido
3. Karlo Butiong
4. Susano Gonzales
5. Rogelio dela Paz
6. Arturo Valenzona
- 6th district:
1. Rosenda Ann Ocampo
2. Corazon Caballes
3. Benedicto Durado
4. Ernesto Rivera
5. Julio "Ging" Logarta Jr.
6. Manuel Isip (GAD)
