= Mel Lopez =

Filipino politician (1935-2017)

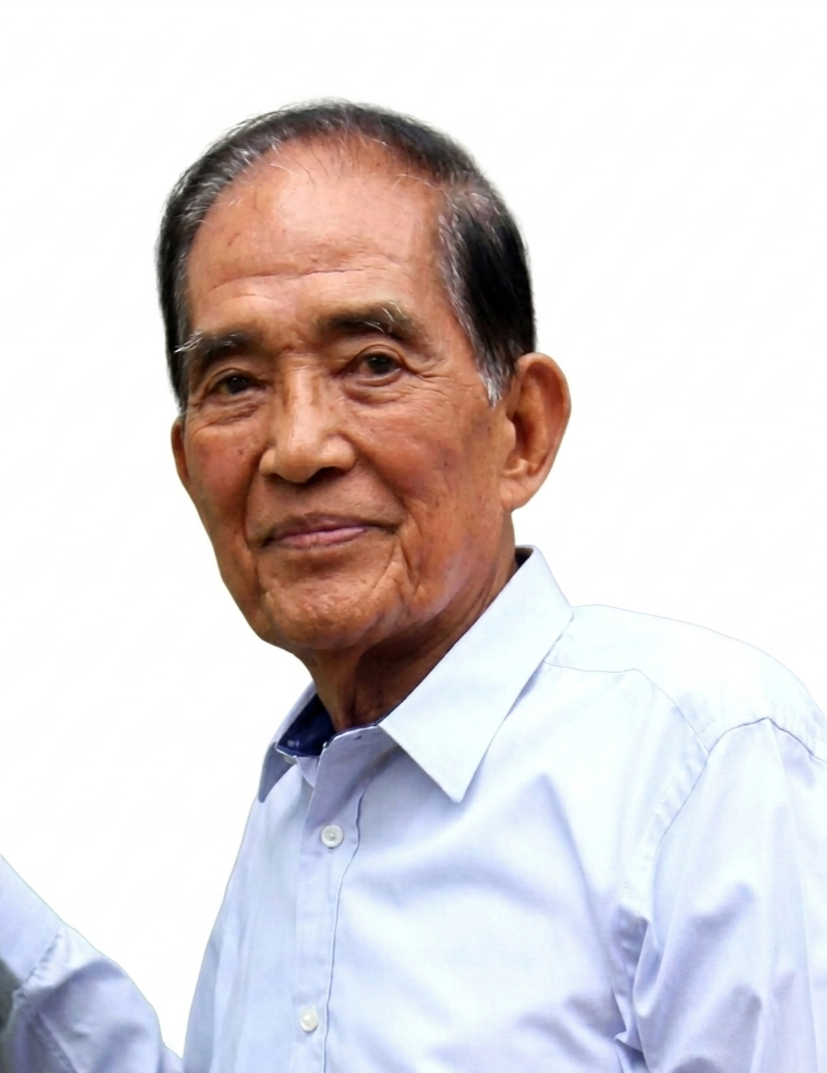
- Lopez, in 2015

Chairman of the Philippine National Oil Corporation
- In office September 2010 – January 1, 2017

3rd Chairman of the Philippine Sports Commission
- In office 1993–1996
- President: Fidel V. Ramos
- Preceded by: Aparicio Mequi
- Succeeded by: Philip Ella Juico

20th and 22nd Mayor of Manila
- In office February 2, 1988 – June 30, 1992
- Vice Mayor: Danny Lacuna (1988-1992); Ernesto V.P. Maceda, Jr. (1992)
- Preceded by: Gregorio Ejercito (Acting)
- Succeeded by: Alfredo Lim
- Officer in Charge
- In office March 26, 1986 – December 1, 1987
- Appointed by: Corazon Aquino
- Vice Mayor: Bambi Ocampo (1986-1987); Ernesto Nieva (1987-1988)
- Preceded by: Ramon Bagatsing
- Succeeded by: Gregorio Ejercito (Acting)

Mambabatas Pambansa (Assemblyman) from Manila
- In office June 30, 1984 – March 25, 1986 Serving with Lito Atienza, Eva Estrada-Kalaw, Carlos Fernando, Gonzalo Puyat II, and Arturo Tolentino

President Pro-Tempore of the Manila Municipal Board
- In office 1972–1975

22nd Vice Mayor of Manila
- Officer in Charge
- In office May 1, 1971 – December 31, 1971
- Mayor: Antonio Villegas
- Preceded by: Danny Lacuna
- Succeeded by: Martin Isidro Sr.

Member of the Manila Municipal Board from the 1st District
- In office December 30, 1967 – December 31, 1975

Personal details
- Born: Gemiliano Campos Lopez Jr. September 1, 1935 Manila, Philippine Islands
- Died: January 1, 2017 (aged 81) Quezon City, Philippines
- Cause of death: Heart attack
- Resting place: The Heritage Park, Taguig
- Party: Liberal (1967–1978, 2009–2017)
- Other political affiliations: Lakas (1992–2003, 2005–2009); KNP (2003–2004); LDP (1988–1991); PDP–Laban (1986–1988); UNIDO (1984–1986)
- Spouse: Concepcion Tantoco (m. 1957)
- Children: 9, including Manny, and Alex
- Relatives: Carlo Lopez (nephew)
- Occupation: Politician

Gemiliano "Mel" Campos Lopez Jr. (September 1, 1935 – January 1, 2017) was a Filipino politician who served as the 20th and 22nd Mayor of Manila from 1988 to 1992, as OIC - Mayor of Manila from 1986 to 1987, and as an assemblyman of the Batasang Pambansa of the Philippines from 1984 to 1986. He was also a former chairman of the Philippine Sports Commission from 1993 to 1996 and the Philippine National Oil Corporation from 2010 until his death in 2017.

== Early life and education ==
Mel Lopez was born in Manila on September 1, 1935 to Carmen Campos of Bulacan and Lt. Col. Gemiliano López Sr. of Manila. He is also the grandson of Honorio Lopez, writer and revolutionary during the Spanish Revolution. He was raised in the district of Tondo.

He graduated from the Jose Rizal University (formerly Jose Rizal College) with a degree in Bachelor of Science in Commercial Science. He also played swimming, boxing and basketball in the NCAA for the JRU Heavy Bombers.

== Personal life ==
He was married to Concepcion Tantoco, a Filipina businesswoman and entrepreneur. They were married for over fifty years and have nine children, over thirty grandchildren, and two great-grandchildren.

== Political career ==
=== Councilor (1967–1975) ===
Lopez was elected municipal board member (city councilor) of Manila in 1967.

On August 21, 1971, the bombing at Plaza Miranda marred a Liberal Party rally, killing 9 persons and injuring 92 more, including Lopez, who was then a city councilor. President Ferdinand Marcos used the bombing incident as a basis to suspend the writ of habeas corpus.

When Marcos declared martial law, Lopez decided to organize active opposition to the regime that could eventually topple it and help restore democracy to the country. He held secret meetings with labor and student leaders, community and political leaders, exploring ideas on how to organize opposition to the martial law regime.

=== Laban ===
Lopez was among the founding signatories of Laban, a contraction of “Lakas ng Bayan” and a Tagalog translation of People's Power. When Marcos announced an election for the Interim Batasang Pambansa on April 7, 1978, he was the campaign manager in Manila, organizing sorties and meetings to attract more citizens to oppose Marcos' dictatorial rule.

=== Batasang Pambansa (1984–1986) ===
In recognition of his leadership in Manila, some 20 prospective candidates of United Nationalists Democratic Organizations (UNIDO) for the 1984 Batasang Pambansa elections signed a resolution giving him authority to select the five other candidates for the six assembly seats assigned to Manila based on voting population.

Marcos' ticket, the Kilusang Bagong Lipunan (KBL), suffered a heavy blow and the UNIDO candidates including Lopez and four others won. While serving in the Batasang Pambansa, he filed bills aimed at proposing the compensation income of spouses who are both employees to be taxed separately, paying lower taxes, seeking to abolish the Metro Manila Commission, providing for the establishment of the Philippine National Language Commission, and providing for a synchronization of national and local elections in 1986.

=== Mayor of Manila (1986–1992) ===
After the People Power Revolution, Lopez was appointed as Mayor of Manila. During his early years, his administration was faced with ₱700 million pesos worth of debt and inherited an empty treasury. In the first eleven months, however, the debt was reduced to ₱365 million and the city's income rose by around 70%. Revenues from movie theaters rose by 180%, from public markets 170%, and the Manila Zoo began to have profits. Manila had an annual income of over ₱700 million due to these increase in tax revenues. Within the same eleven months, 21 schools were built. Squatters were relocated, with an average of 12,700 families a year.

During the 1988 elections, he ran for a full term under the PDP–Laban and won, defeating Housing General Manager Lito Atienza and former Senator Eva Estrada-Kalaw, both his fellow former delegates at the Batasang Pambansa.

Lopez closed down numerous illegal gambling joints and jueteng. He also blocked the re-opening of jai-alai despite pressure from powerful groups.

In January 1990, Lopez padlocked two Manila casinos operated by the Philippine Amusement and Gaming Corporation (PAGCOR), saying the billions it gained cannot make up for the negative effects gambling inflicts upon the people, particularly the youth. As a result of this, he was charged with graft in the Sandiganbayan in the same year. The case remained unresolved until it was finally dropped in June 2002.

He also worked for the revival of the Boys’ Town Haven (now referred to as “Boys Town”), rehabilitating its facilities to accommodate underprivileged children and provide them with livelihood and education.

During the 1992 elections, he lost reelection to former National Bureau of Investigation director Alfredo Lim.

== Post-mayoralty (1992–2017) ==
In 1993, he was appointed by President Fidel Ramos as Chairman of the Philippine Sports Commission, serving until 1996. During his term as PSC Chairman, he helped Onyok Velasco to captured the silver medal in the 1996 Summer Olympics in Atlanta, USA, together with his son Manny Lopez, then-president of the Amateur Boxing Association of the Philippines (renamed as Association of Boxing Alliances in the Philippines or ABAP).

In 1995, he sought a rematch against Lim but was unsuccessful. Nine years later, in 2004, he ran again for mayor against then incumbent Mayor Lito Atienza under the Koalisyon ng Nagkakaisang Pilipino (KNP) but lost. He last served as chairman of the Philippine National Oil Company and Pacific Concrete Products Inc.

Lopez died on New Year's Day, January 1, 2017, at St. Luke's Medical Center in Quezon City due to a heart attack at the age of 81. His wake was held at The Aeternum at Heritage Park in Taguig and later at the Archdiocesan Shrine of Santo Niño de Tondo. A necrological service for him was held at the Manila City Hall on January 5. His remains were interred at The Heritage Park in Taguig.

== Legacy ==
In April 2019, President Rodrigo Duterte signed Republic Act No. 11280 to officially rename a portion of Radial Road 10 to Mel Lopez Boulevard, which runs from Anda Circle in Manila up north to Estero de Marala at the city's border with Navotas.

Political offices
Preceded by Danilo Lacuna	Vice Mayor of Manila; Officer-In-Charge; 1971	Succeeded by Martin Isidro Sr.
Preceded by Ramon Bagatsing	Mayor of Manila; Officer-In-Charge; 1986–1987	Succeeded by Gregorio Ejercito as Officer-in-Charge Mayor of Manila
Preceded by Gregorio Ejercito as Officer-in-Charge Mayor of Manila	Mayor of Manila; 1988–1992	Succeeded by Alfredo Lim
Government offices
Preceded by Aparicio Mequi	Chairman of the Philippine Sports Commission; 1993–1996	Succeeded by Philip Ella Juico
