= Danny Lacuna =

Filipino lawyer and politician (1938–2023)

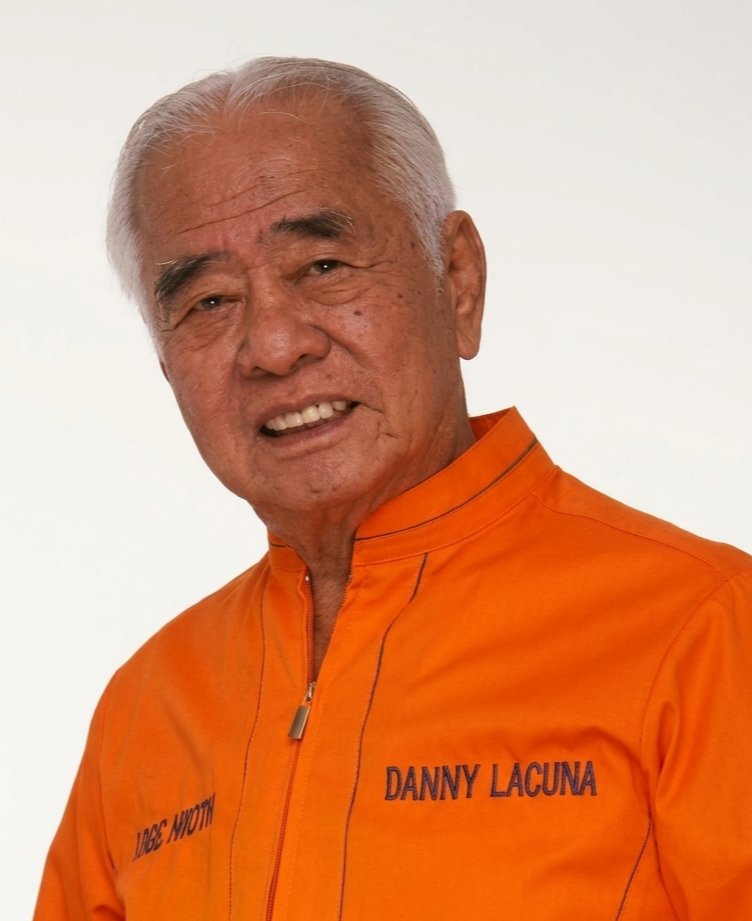
- Portrait of VM Danny Lacuna

21th, 27th and 32nd Vice Mayor of Manila
- In office June 30, 1998 – June 30, 2007
- Mayor: Lito Atienza
- Preceded by: Larry Silva (Acting)
- Succeeded by: Isko Moreno
- In office February 3, 1988 – January 31, 1992
- Mayor: Mel Lopez
- Preceded by: Ernesto Nieva
- Succeeded by: Ernesto Maceda Jr.
- In office September 1, 1970 – April 30, 1971; Officer In Charge
- Mayor: Antonio Villegas
- Preceded by: Ernesto Maceda Sr.
- Succeeded by: Mel Lopez (Acting)

Member of the Manila Municipal Board from the 3rd district
- In office December 30, 1967 – December 31, 1975

Personal details
- Born: Danilo Bautista Lacuna; March 23, 1938 Manila, Commonwealth of the Philippines
- Died: August 13, 2023 (aged 85) Manila, Philippines
- Resting place: Manila South Cemetery
- Party: Asenso Manileño (2005–2023)
- Other political affiliations: Nacionalista (1967–1970, 2010–2012); PDP–Laban (1988–2010); KNP (2004); KABAKA (2001); LAMMP (1998); Liberal (1970–1975)
- Spouse: Melanie Honrado (m. 1964)
- Children: 5 (including Honey)
- Occupation: Politician
- Profession: Lawyer

Danilo "Danny" Bautista Lacuna Sr. (March 23, 1938 – August 13, 2023) was a Filipino lawyer and politician who served as the 20th, 26th and 31st Vice Mayor of Manila. He was the father of former Manila Mayor Honey Lacuna and was a mentor of incumbent Mayor Isko Moreno.

== Political career ==
Lacuna served as a special assistant to the then Manila Municipal Board beginning in 1963 and city councilor (municipal board member) from the 3rd district from 1967 to 1975. He later became the city's acting vice mayor from 1970 to 1971 and was later elected to serve from 1988 to 1992 and from 1998 to 2007. Lacuna was the founder of the local party Asenso Manileño. He also unsuccessfully ran for mayor of Manila in 1992 and in 2007 and for representative of the 6th district of Manila in 2010.

== Later life and death ==
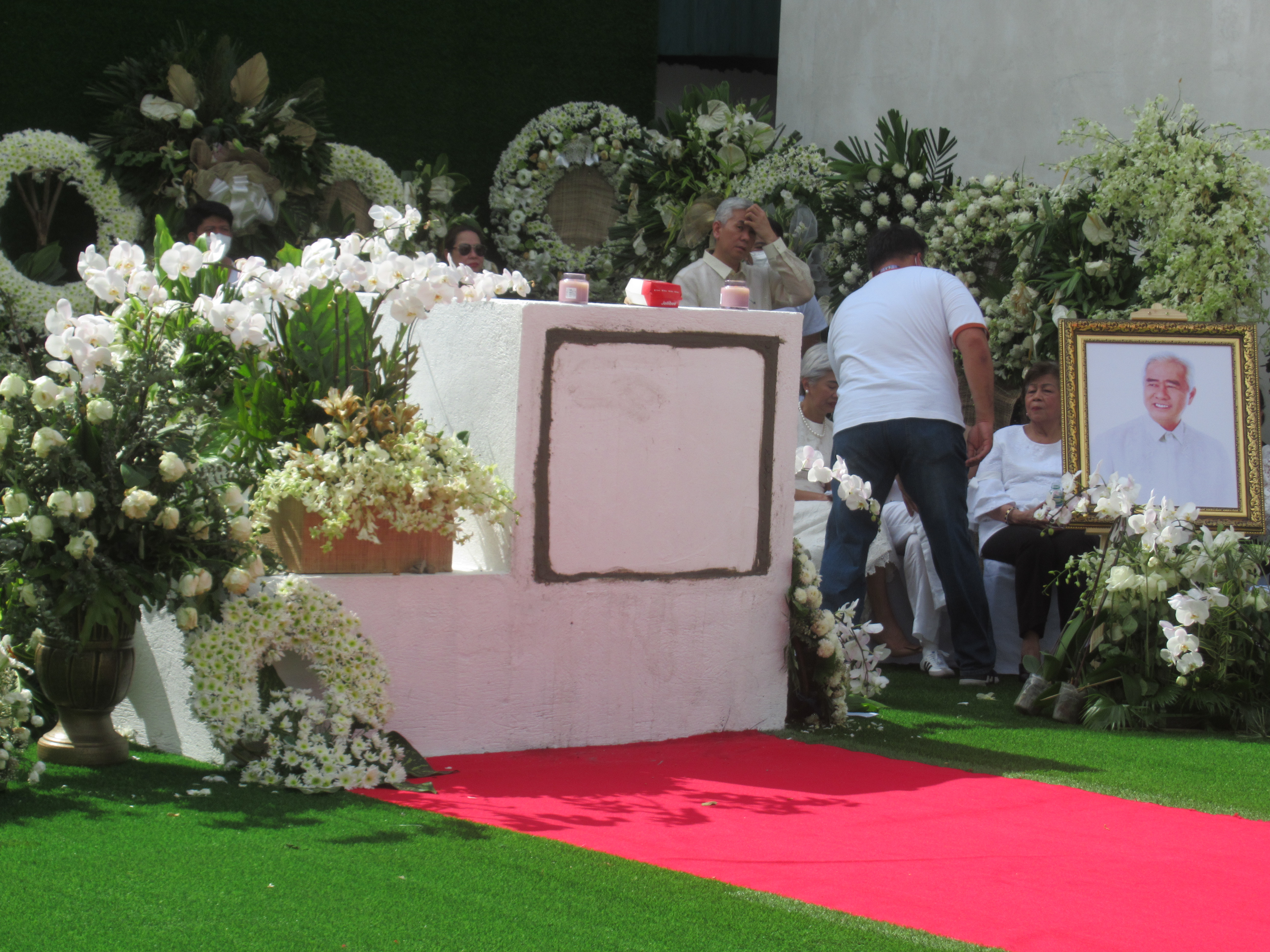
Interment at Manila South Cemetery

Lacuna was diagnosed with stroke in 2016, making him disabled. He died on August 13, 2023, at the age of 85. He was laid to rest at the Manila South Cemetery. The session hall of the Manila City Hall, the meeting place of the Manila City Council, is renamed after him.
