= 2001 Manila local elections =

12th Mayoral election in the City of Manila

2001 Manila mayoral election
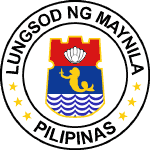
- May 14, 2001
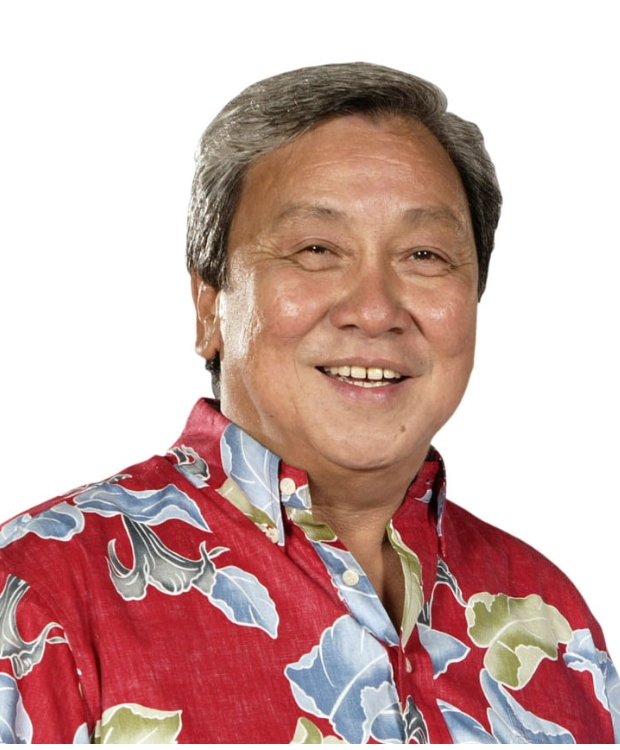

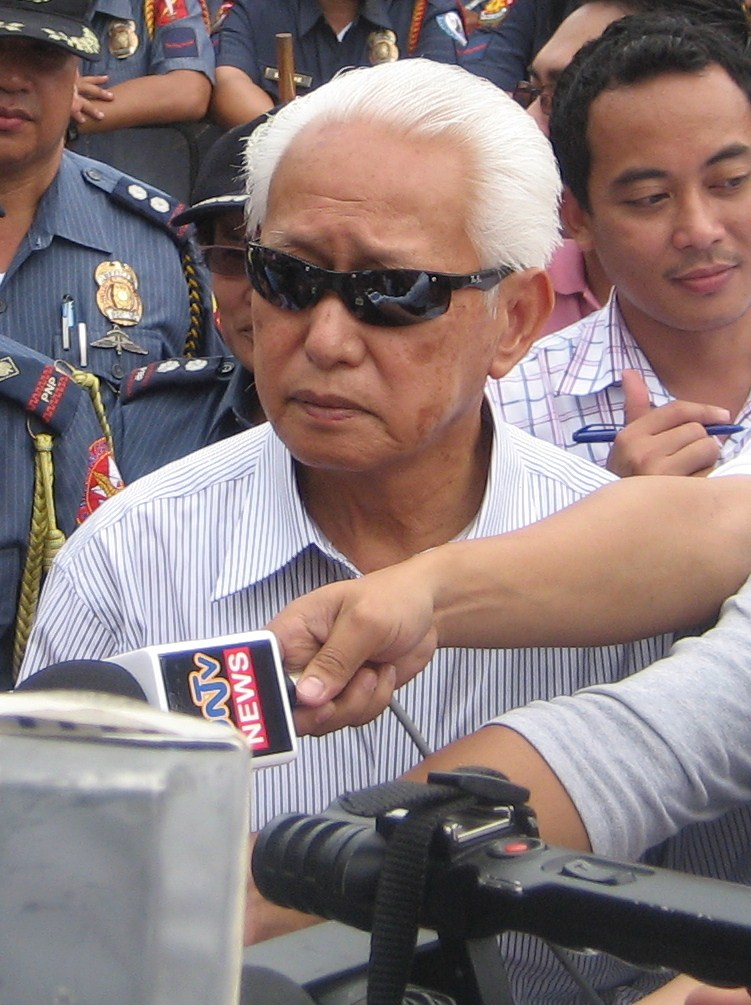

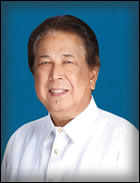
Nominee	Lito Atienza	Alfredo Lim	Amado Bagatsing
Party	Liberal	KKK	KAMPI
Running mate	Ernesto Dionisio	Roger Gernale	Danny Lacuna (PDP–Laban)
Popular vote	255,021	199,070	127,394
Percentage	43.81	34.20	21.88
Mayor before election
Lito Atienza
Liberal
Elected mayor
Lito Atienza
Liberal
- Vice mayoral election
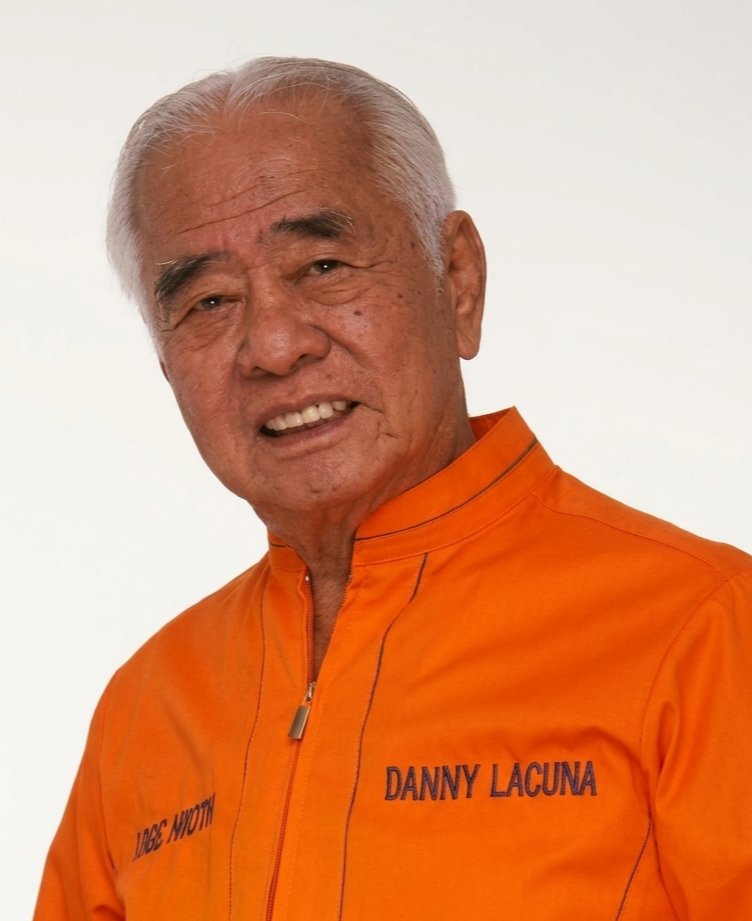
Candidate	Danny Lacuna	Ernesto Dionisio	Roger Gernale
Party	PDP–Laban	Liberal	KKK
Popular vote	327,513	138,460	76,907
Percentage	59.79	25.28	14.04
Vice Mayor before election
Danny Lacuna
PDP–Laban
Elected Vice Mayor
Danny Lacuna
PDP–Laban

Local elections was held in the City of Manila on May 14, 2001, within the Philippine general election. The voters elected for the elective local posts in the city: the mayor, vice mayor, the six Congressmen, and the councilors, six in each of the city's six legislative districts.

== Background ==
When Alfredo Lim lost the presidential race in 1998, he established the local party then known as Katarungan, Kapayapaan at Kaunlaran–Laban or KKK–Laban for his mayoral comeback in 2001. He chose Manila Fifth District Councilor Roger Gernale as his running mate.

Lito Atienza will run for his second term with Ernesto Dionisio Sr. as his running mate. Congressman Amado Bagatsing also run as mayor, reviving their 1998 tandem with incumbent vice mayor Danny Lacuna.

== Results ==
=== For Mayor ===
Incumbent Mayor Lito Atienza won his second consecutive term against former Mayor Alfredo Lim.

2001 Manila Mayoral election
Candidate	Party	Votes	%
Lito Atienza	Liberal Party	255,021	43.81
Alfredo Lim	Kapayapaan, Kaunlaran at Katarungan	199,070	34.20
Amado Bagatsing	Kabalikat ng Malayang Pilipino	127,394	21.88
Imelda Apostol	Independent	196	0.03
Onofre Abad	Independent	157	0.03
Benjamin Rivera	Independent	144	0.02
Antonio Gamo	Independent	136	0.02
Total		582,118	100.00

=== For Vice Mayor ===
Incumbent Vice Mayor Danny Lacuna won his third consecutive term against four candidates including former city administrator Ernesto Dionisio Sr.

2001 Manila Vice Mayoral election
Candidate	Party	Votes	%
Danny Lacuna	PDP–Laban	327,513	59.79
Ernesto Dionisio Sr.	Liberal Party	138,460	25.28
Roger Gernale	Kapayapaan, Kaunlaran at Katarungan	76,907	14.04
Roberto "Amay Bisaya" Reyes	Kilusang Bagong Lipunan	2,989	0.55
Helen Remedios Salgado	Independent	1,931	0.35
Total		547,800	100.00

=== Representatives ===
==== Manila's 1st district ====
Candidate	Party	Votes	%
Ernesto Nieva	Lakas–NUCD–UMDP	62,548	65.60
Martin Isidro Sr.	Liberal Party	24,749	25.96
Roberto Sese	Independent	7,846	8.23
Abraham Liguidliguid	Pwersa ng Masang Pilipino	205	0.22
Total		95,348	100.00

==== Manila's 2nd district ====
Candidate	Party	Votes	%
Jaime Lopez	Lakas–NUCD–UMDP	35,329	48.30
Nestor Ponce (incumbent)	Liberal Party	28,881	39.49
Abelardo Viceo	Independent	8,932	12.21
Total		73,142	100.00

==== Manila's 3rd district ====
Candidate	Party	Votes	%
Harry Angping	Nationalist People's Coalition	44,353	62.78
Leonardo Fugoso (incumbent)	Liberal Party	19,445	27.53
Armando Ducat Jr.	Independent	6,845	9.69
Total		70,643	100.00

==== Manila's 4th district ====
Candidate	Party	Votes	%
Rodolfo Bacani	Liberal Party	67,548	76.27
Maria Paz Herrera	Kabalikat ng Malayang Pilipino	21,011	23.73
Total		88,559	100.00

==== Manila's 5th district ====
Candidate	Party	Votes	%
Joey Hizon	Liberal Party	77,237	87.34
Felix Cantal	Independent	10,626	12.02
Ricardo Daniac	Independent	569	0.64
Total		88,432	100.00

==== Manila's 6th district ====
Candidate	Party	Votes	%
Mario Crespo	Independent	32,097	37.50
Pablo V. Ocampo	Nationalist People's Coalition	30,038	35.09
Benny Abante	Lakas–NUCD–UMDP	21,967	25.66
Valeriano Reloj	Independent	762	0.89
Carlos Fernandez	Kabalikat ng Malayang Pilipino	469	0.55
Richard Bautista	Independent	267	0.31
Total		85,600	100.00
