= 1998 Manila local elections =

11th Mayoral election in the City of Manila

1998 Manila mayoral election
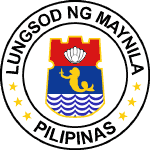
- May 11, 1998
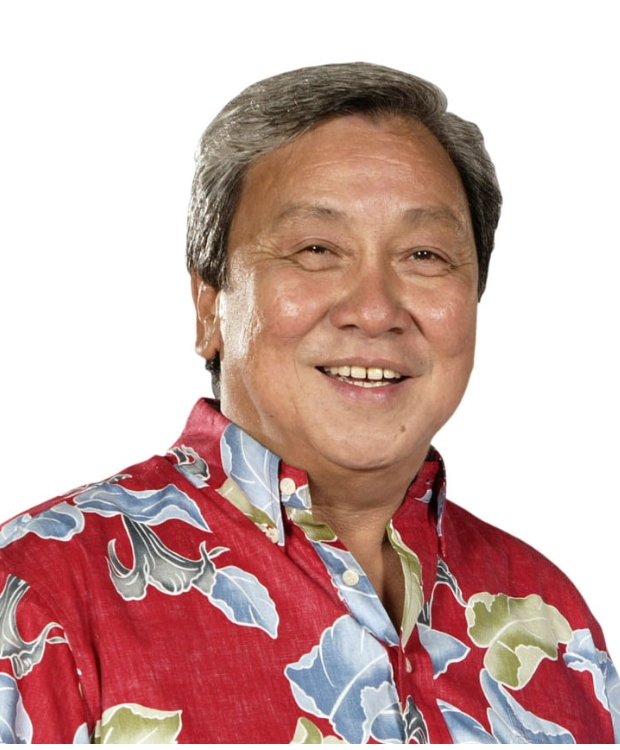

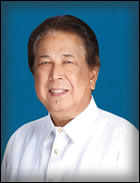

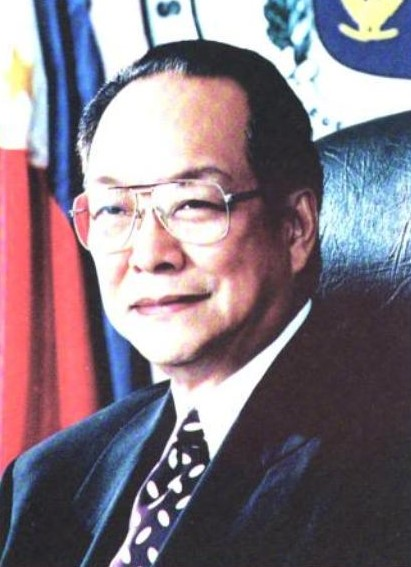

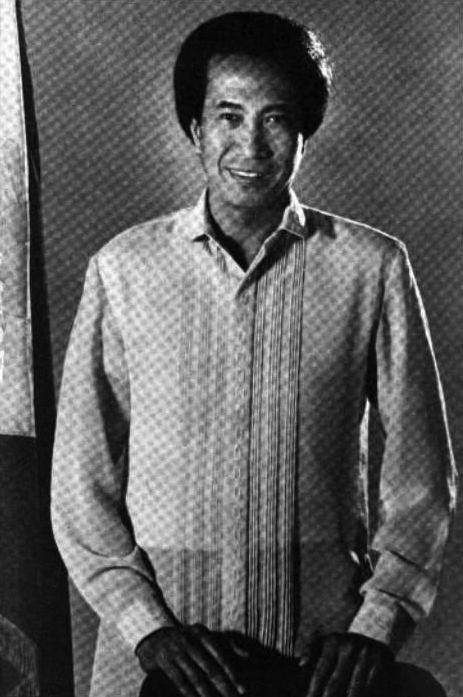
Candidate	Lito Atienza	Amado Bagatsing	Ernesto Maceda
Party	Liberal	LAMMP	NPC
Running mate	Butch Belgica	Danny Lacuna	Martin Isidro Sr. (LAMMP)
Popular vote	197,476	161,728	160,004
Percentage	29.67	24.30	24.04
Candidate	Jaime Lopez
Party	Lakas
Running mate	Maria Lourdes Isip
Popular vote	144,754
Percentage	21.75
Mayor before election
Lito Atienza
Liberal
Elected mayor
Lito Atienza
Liberal
- Vice mayoral election
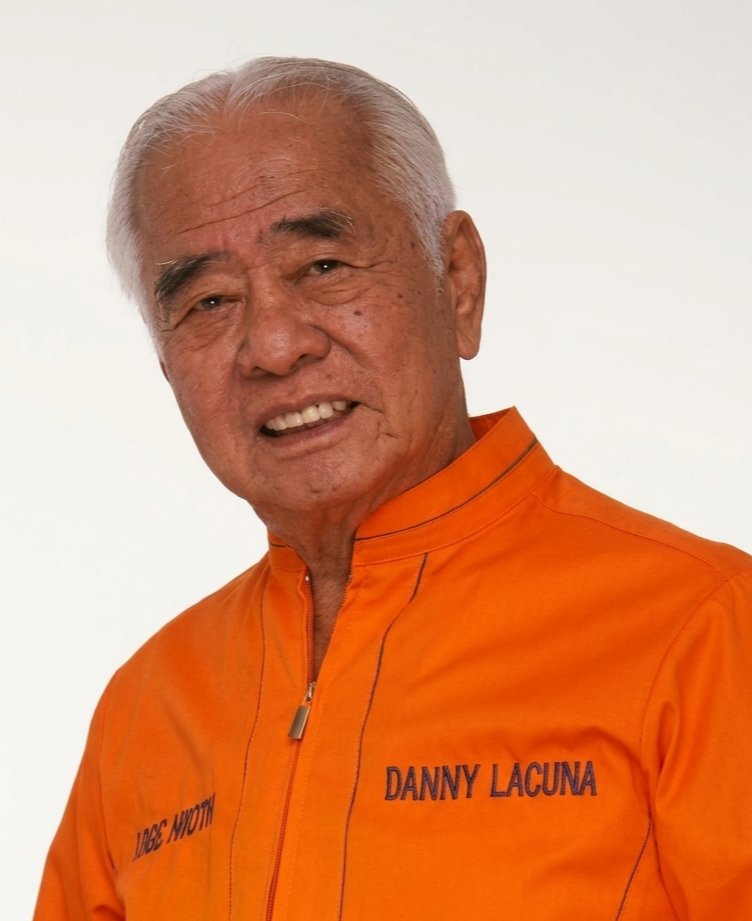

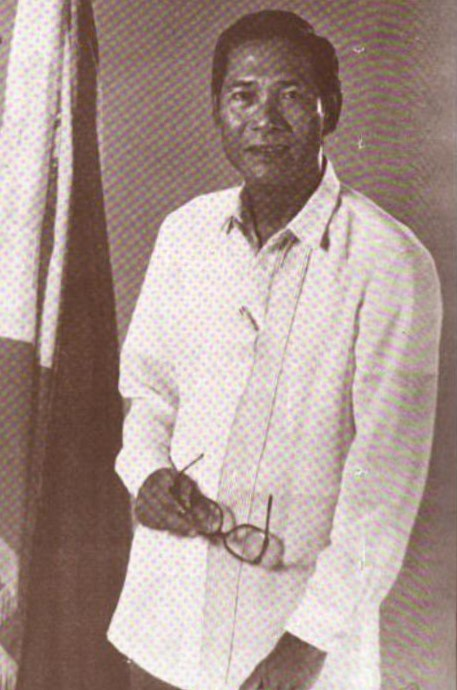

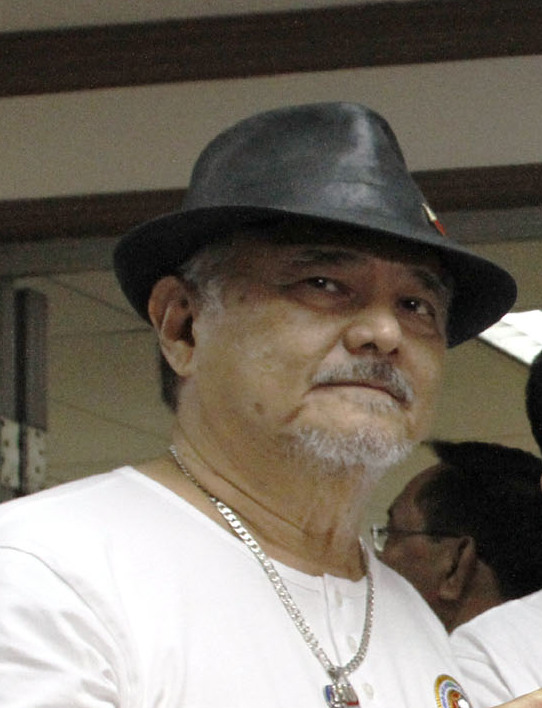
Candidate	Danny Lacuna	Maria Lourdes Isip	Martin Isidro Sr.
Party	LAMMP	Lakas	LAMMP
Popular vote	261,937	136,247	121,976
Percentage	40.42	21.02	18.82
Candidate	Butch Belgica
Party	Liberal
Popular vote	119,079
Percentage	18.37
Vice Mayor before election
Larry Silva
Lakas
Elected Vice Mayor
Danny Lacuna
LAMMP

Local elections was held in the City of Manila on May 11, 1998, within the Philippine general election. The voters elected for the elective local posts in the city: the mayor, vice mayor, the six congressmen, and the councilors, six in each of the city's six legislative districts.

With the resignation of Alfredo Lim to run for president, Vice Mayor Lito Atienza was seated as mayor, with former boxer-comedian and first councilor Larry Silva as the vice mayor. Atienza won the election after facing Third district congressman Jaime C. Lopez, senator Ernesto Maceda, and congressman Amado Bagatsing. Bagatsing's running-mate, and 1992 mayoral candidate Danny Lacuna won the vice mayorship.

In this election also won the first term of actor and future mayor Isko Moreno as councilor from the 1st district.

== Results ==
=== For Mayor ===
Incumbent Mayor Lito Atienza won his first term against ten candidates, including 5th district representative Amado Bagatsing, senator Ernesto Maceda and 3rd district representative Jaime Lopez.

1998 Manila Mayoral election
Candidate	Party	Votes	%
Lito Atienza	Liberal Party	197,476	29.67
Amado Bagatsing	Laban ng Makabayang Masang Pilipino	161,728	24.30
Ernesto Maceda	Nationalist People's Coalition	160,004	24.04
Jaime Lopez	Lakas–NUCD–UMDP	144,754	21.75
Onofre Abad	Independent	350	0.05
Benjamin Rivera	Independent	331	0.05
Benigno Perez	Partido para sa Demokratikong Reporma	289	0.04
Reynaldo Navarez	Kilusang Bagong Lipunan	239	0.04
Johnny Regalado	PDP–Laban	221	0.03
Antonio Gamo	Independent	203	0.03
Gervacio Benegas	Independent	47	0.01
Total		665,642	100.00

=== For Vice Mayor ===
Incumbent vice mayor Larry Silva opted to run for a return as a 3rd district councilor instead of seeking a full term as vice mayor. Former vice mayor Danny Lacuna won against five candidates including 1st district representative Martin Isidro Sr. and 6th district councilor Butch Belgica.

1998 Manila Vice Mayoral election
Candidate	Party	Votes	%
Danny Lacuna	Laban ng Makabayang Masang Pilipino	261,937	40.42
Maria Lourdes Isip	Lakas–NUCD–UMDP	136,247	21.02
Martin Isidro Sr.	Laban ng Makabayang Masang Pilipino	121,976	18.82
Butch Belgica	Liberal Party	119,079	18.37
Reynaldo Alalar	Aksyon Demokratiko	6,544	1.01
Jaime Ramos	Partido para sa Demokratikong Reporma	2,309	0.36
Total		648,092	100.00

=== Manila's 1st district ===
Term-limited incumbent Martin Isidro Sr. of the Nationalist People's Coalition ran for Vice Mayor of Manila. Ernesto Nieva of Laban ng Makabayang Masang Pilipino won the election.

Candidate	Party	Votes	%
Ernesto Nieva	Laban ng Makabayang Masang Pilipino	65,136	48.88
Ernesto Dionisio	Liberal Party	46,942	35.23
Roberto Sese	Laban ng Makabayang Masang Pilipino	13,433	10.08
Honorio Lopez II	Lakas–NUCD–UMDP	7,365	5.53
Percy Lapid	Kilusang Bagong Lipunan	249	0.19
Abraham Liguidliguid	Kilusang Bagong Lipunan	121	0.09
Total		133,246	100.00
Source: Commission on Elections

=== Manila's 2nd district ===
Term-limited incumbent Jaime Lopez of Lakas–NUCD–UMDP ran for Mayor of Manila. Lakas–NUCD–UMDP nominated Flaviano Concepcion Jr., who was defeated by Nestor Ponce Jr. of the Liberal Party.

Candidate	Party	Votes	%
Nestor Ponce Jr.	Liberal Party	34,068	35.22
Natalio Beltran Jr.	Nationalist People's Coalition	28,850	29.83
Flaviano Concepcion Jr.	Lakas–NUCD–UMDP	26,841	27.75
Alberto Lim	Laban ng Makabayang Masang Pilipino	6,709	6.94
Gertrudes Reyes	Partido para sa Demokratikong Reporma	256	0.26
Total		96,724	100.00
Source: Commission on Elections

=== Manila's 3rd district ===
Incumbent Leonardo Fugoso of the Liberal Party was term-limited. The Liberal Party nominated Jhosep Lopez, who was defeated by Harry Angping of Laban ng Makabayang Masang Pilipino.

Candidate	Party	Votes	%
Harry Angping	Laban ng Makabayang Masang Pilipino	39,424	42.10
Jhosep Lopez	Liberal Party	34,387	36.72
Manuel Zarcal	Lakas–NUCD–UMDP	15,115	16.14
Joaquin Roces	Laban ng Makabayang Masang Pilipino	4,727	5.05
Total		93,653	100.00
Source: Commission on Elections

=== Manila's 4th district ===
Term-limited incumbent Ramon Bagatsing Jr. of Laban ng Makabayang Masang Pilipino (LAMMP) ran for the Senate. The LAMMP nominated Victoriano Melendez, who was defeated by Rodolfo Bacani of the Liberal Party.

Candidate	Party	Votes	%
Rodolfo Bacani	Liberal Party	43,643	37.06
Victoriano Melendez	Laban ng Makabayang Masang Pilipino	39,384	33.44
Ernesto Diokno	Lakas–NUCD–UMDP	33,858	28.75
Salvacion Aguila	Partido para sa Demokratikong Reporma	486	0.41
Douglas Santiago	Kilusang Bagong Lipunan	404	0.34
Total		117,775	100.00
Source: Commission on Elections

=== Manila's 5th district ===
Term-limited incumbent Amado Bagatsing of Laban ng Makabayang Masang Pilipino (LAMMP) ran for Mayor of Manila. The LAMMP nominated Felixberto Espiritu, who was defeated by Joey Hizon of the Liberal Party.

Candidate	Party	Votes	%
Joey Hizon	Liberal Party	64,023	61.78
Felixberto Espiritu	Laban ng Makabayang Masang Pilipino	34,347	33.15
Gonzalo Puyat II	Lakas–NUCD–UMDP	4,293	4.14
Lino Inciong	Independent	392	0.38
Mariano Abanilla	Partido para sa Demokratikong Reporma	386	0.37
Marlo de Mesa	Kilusang Bagong Lipunan	115	0.11
Ricardo Daniac	Independent	68	0.07
Total		103,624	100.00
Source: Commission on Elections

=== Manila's 6th district ===
Incumbent Rosenda Ann Ocampo of the Nationalist People's Coalition was re-elected to a third term.

Candidate	Party	Votes	%
Rosenda Ann Ocampo (incumbent)	Nationalist People's Coalition	67,721	69.27
Carlos Fernandez	Laban ng Makabayang Masang Pilipino	20,429	20.90
Arturo Añas	Lakas–NUCD–UMDP	8,881	9.08
Isidro Holgado	Kilusang Bagong Lipunan	401	0.41
Don Alvaro Gallarzan	Independent	328	0.34
Total		97,760	100.00
Source: Commission on Elections
