= Kapayapaan, Kaunlaran at Katarungan =

Filipino political party based in Manila

- Leader: Cristy Lim Raymundo; Alfredo Lim (until 2020)
- Founder: Alfredo Lim
- Founded: 2001
- Headquarters: Manila
- Ideology: Localism
- National affiliation: PDP–Laban (2018–2019); Liberal (2009–2018); PMP (2004–2008)
- Colors: Yellow

Laban para sa Kapayapaan, Kaunlaran at Katarungan (KKK; transl. Struggle for Peace, Progress and Justice) is a local Manila-based political organization founded by former Manila Mayor Alfredo Lim in 2001. He ran for local office with the party in the 2001, 2010, and 2013 elections.

== History ==
=== 2001 ===
When Alfredo Lim lost the presidential race in 1998, he established the local party then known as Katarungan, Kapayapaan at Kaunlaran–Laban or KKK–Laban for his mayoral comeback in 2001. He chose Manila Fifth District Councilor Roger Gernale as his running mate. They lost to the incumbent and his former running mate Lito Atienza and Danny Lacuna.

=== 2010 ===
Lim ran again in 2010, this time with Isko Moreno as his running mate. The two won the elections.

=== 2016 ===
In 2016, Lim ran again under the banner and again under Liberal, he choose another Liberal 1st district Congressman Benjamin "Atong" Asilo as running-mate. On April 27, 2016, Lim asked his running mate, Asilo, to withdraw from the vice mayoral race due to low survey standings, replacing him with Councilor Ali Atienza, who is already the running mate of Amado Bagatsing. Asilo declined to withdraw, choosing to continue his campaign even without a mayoral running mate.

=== 2018 ===
In 2018, KKK are one of the more than 5,000 people were sworn in as members of PDP–Laban, thus KKK aligned with that national party. Koko Pimentel, the leader of PDP–Laban at the Senate endorsed Lim and the slate, as Lim will go for another comeback bid in 2019, even though without a running mate. He faced former opponent Joseph Estrada, and former running mate Moreno. Lim only placed third on the final counting with Moreno seized the victory.

== Electoral performance ==
=== Mayoral and Vice Mayoral elections ===
Year	Mayoral election				Vice mayoral election			
Year	Candidate	Votes	Vote share	Result	Candidate	Votes	Vote share	Result
2001	Alfredo Lim	199,070	34.2%	Lost	Roger Gernale	76,907	14.04%	Lost
2004	Did not participate			—N/a	Did not participate			—N/a
2007	Alfredo Lim	207,881	37.82%	Won	Joey Hizon	166,169	30.85%	Lost
2010	Alfredo Lim	395,910	59.52%	Won	None (Note: Lim's running mate is Isko Moreno of Asenso Manileño/Nacionalista)			—N/a
2013	Alfredo Lim	308,544	38.78%	Lost	None (Note: Lim's running mate is Lou Veloso of Liberal)			—N/a
2016	Alfredo Lim	280,464	38.17%	Lost	None (Note: Lim originally picked Atong Asilo as running-mate, but later supported Ali Atienza of UNA (who also Amado Bagatsing's running-mate))			—N/a
2019	Alfredo Lim	138,923	19.46%	Lost	None (Note: Lim did not have any running mate)			—N/a
2022	Did not participate			—N/a	Did not participate			—N/a

=== Legislative elections ===
City Council			House of Representatives		
Year	Seats won	Result	Year	Seats won	Result
2001	0 / 38	Lost	2001	Did not participate	—N/a
2004	Did not participate	—N/a	2004	Did not participate	—N/a
2007	Did not participate	—N/a	2007	Did not participate	—N/a
2010	0 / 38	Lost	2010	2 / 6	Joined Majority
2013	0 / 38	Lost	2013	1 / 6	Joined Majority
2016	Did not participate	—N/a	2016	Did not participate	—N/a
2019 (Note: Only affiliated with both PDP-Laban, and KKK)	Did not participate	—N/a	2019 (Note: Two candidates are only affiliated with KKK, but only supported by PDP-Laban)	1 / 6	Joined Majority
2022	Did not participate	—N/a	2022	Did not participate	—N/a
