= Santa Ana Hospital, Manila =

Government hospital in Manila, Philippines

Santa Ana Hospital

Geography
- Location: Santa Ana, Manila, Philippines
- Coordinates: 14°35′00″N 121°00′59″E

Organization
- Care system: Public, PhilHealth-accredited
- Type: Public

Services
- Emergency department: Yes
- Beds: 500

History
- Construction started: 2009
- Opened: April 28, 2010

Links
- Lists: Hospitals in the Philippines

Santa Ana Hospital is a 10-storey, 500-bed city-run hospital located in New Panaderos Street, Santa Ana, Manila, Philippines. It is also one of the six district hospitals of the City of Manila, catering its 6th district, which consists of Santa Ana, Santa Mesa, Pandacan, San Miguel, and the northern portion of Paco. It stands on the site of an earlier hospital, Trinity Hospital, which moved to a new location nearby in 1998. It was built through the partnership of the City of Manila and Lucio Tan's Tan Yan Kee Foundation. Tan wanted to name the hospital after his mother or father, while the city wanted to name it for former President Corazon Aquino. Both sides agreed on using the present name.

The hospital was established on December 29, 2009, by virtue of Budget Ordinance 8206 passed by the Manila City Council during the term of Mayor Alfredo Lim. Construction started in 2009 and was completed in April 2010, with the hospital opening on April 28. On July 30, 2021, the hospital became a dialysis center, the third of its kind in the city.
