= Lydia Yu-Jose =

Filipino academic

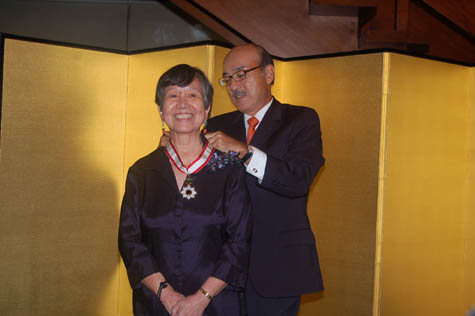
- Lydia Yu-Jose being conferred the Order of the Rising Sun in Makati City on June 13, 2012
- Born: March 27, 1944; Santa Ana, City of Greater Manila, Second Philippine Republic
- Died: August 3, 2014 (aged 70); Quezon City, Philippines
- Known for: Japanese studies, history of Japan–Philippines relations
- Awards: Order of the Rising Sun (2012)

Academic background
- Education: Far Eastern University; Ateneo de Manila University; Sophia University

Academic work
- Discipline: History, political science, international relations, area studies
- Institutions: Ateneo de Manila University

Lydia N. Yu-Jose (March 27, 1944 – August 3, 2014) was a Filipino professor of political science and Japanese Studies at the Ateneo de Manila University in the Philippines. A graduate of Sophia University, she was best known for her research into the history of Japan–Philippines relations, as well as aiding in the development of Japanese studies in the Philippines as a separate academic discipline.

== Life and career ==
Lydia Yu-Jose was born on March 27, 1944, and spent her childhood in Santa Ana, Manila. She went to Santa Ana Elementary School for her elementary education, then graduated with honors from the Felipe G. Calderon High School. She then pursued her undergraduate education at Far Eastern University, graduating with a degree in education in 1965, and afterward teaching for two years at the Malate Catholic School.

In 1967, she first entered the Ateneo de Manila University, where she was hired as a graduate assistant at the Department of Political Science while simultaneously pursuing her master's degree in history. She eventually shifted concentrations, finished her MA in Political Science and began teaching at the Ateneo in 1970. In addition, she was taking classes at the Ateneo de Manila's newly established Japanese Studies Program, ostensibly out of boredom with her Political Science classes, and in 1969, at the suggestion of its director, she applied for and was awarded a Monbukagakusho scholarship by the Japanese government to study at the International Christian University, where she stayed until 1971.

In 1989, Yu-Jose was appointed director of the Japanese Studies Program, a position she held until 1993, then again from 1995 to 1996. The following year, she was appointed chair of the Department of Political Science, a position she held until 2001. She also served as director of the Ateneo Center for Asian Studies from 2004 to 2013. She was one of the founders of the Japanese Studies Association in South East Asia(JSA-ASEAN) in 2004.

Yu-Jose was conferred the Order of the Rising Sun, Gold Rays with Neck Ribbon in 2012, in recognition of her contributions to the development of Japanese studies as a separate academic discipline in the Philippines, as well as for fostering understanding between the two countries.

On August 3, 2014, Yu-Jose died after a six-year-long battle with non-Hodgkin lymphoma.

== Personal life ==
Yu-Jose was married to Ricardo T. Jose, who she met while studying for her doctorate at Sophia University. He is also the director of the Third World Studies Center at the University of the Philippines Diliman, and the son of pianist Regalado Jose, who taught at the UP College of Music.

== Publications ==
Books authored or co-authored by Lydia Yu-Jose

- Basic Nihongo (1992)
- Japan views the Philippines, 1900–1944 (1992)
- International and domestic factors that affected Japanese emigration to the Philippines (1994)
- The Japanese occupation of the Philippines: a pictorial history (1997; co-authored with Ricardo T. Jose)
- An annotated bibliography on Philippines-Japan relations, 1935 to 1956 (1998; co-authored with Ricardo T. Jose)
- Filipinos in Japan and Okinawa, 1880s-1972 (2002)

Books edited by Lydia Yu-Jose

- Philippine external relations: a centennial vista (1998; edited with Aileen Baviera)
- Philippines and Japan: directions and challenges (selected papers from the third and fourth international conferences on Japanese studies) (2000; edited with Rosalina Palanca-Tan)
- Philippines-Japan relations (2003; edited with Ikehata Setsuho)
- Asian cooperation: problems and challenges in the new century (2005)
- Tatlong nikkeijin and six photos: culture, people and state power (2008)
- The Past, love, money and much more: Philippines-Japan relations since the end of the Second World War (2008)
- Civil society organizations in the Philippines: a mapping and strategic assessment (2011)
- Japan: migration and a multicultural society (2014; edited with Johanna O. Zulueta)

Scholarly articles written by Lydia Yu-Jose

- "Philippines-Japan Economic Partnership: Where is the Philippines in Japan's Plan?" (2004)
- "Global Environmental Issues: Responses from Japan" (2004)
- "American Colonialism in the Philippines: Different but still Colonialism" (2005)
- "Boundary, Fluidity and Ideology: A Comparison of Japan's pre-World War II and Present Regionalisms" (2012)

Translations

- Pagmumunimuni tungkol sa pangkinatawang pamahalaan ni J.S. Mill (1991)
- Ang mga Hapones ni Edwin O. Reischauer (1992)

Unpublished manuscripts

- "Comparison of the role of education in the political development of Japan and the Philippines." (master's thesis; 1970)
