= Imelda Papin: The Untold Story =

2023 Filipino biographical film

- Directed by: Gabby Ramos
- Starring: Claudine Barretto; Jeorge "ER" Ejercito Estregan; Alice Dixson; Gary Estrada; Maffi Papin Carrion
- Cinematography: George Toralba; Gilbert Obispo
- Edited by: Mark Jason Sucgang; JayR Bolante
- Music by: Gerry Nisperos; Jason Bagasina
- Production company: QueenStar Film Production
- Release date: November 29, 2023 (SM Megamall)
- Country: Philippines
- Languages: Filipino; English

Imelda Papin: The Untold Story (previously titled Loyalista: The Untold Story of Imelda Papin) is a 2023 Filipino biographical film focusing on singer Imelda Papin's stay in Hawaii to join deposed president Ferdinand Marcos and his wife Imelda in their exile after the People Power Revolution. Directed by Gabby Ramos, the film stars Claudine Barretto in the titular role, alongside Jeorge "ER" Ejercito Estregan and Alice Dixson as the Marcoses and Gary Estrada as Bong Carrion.

== Cast ==
- Claudine Barretto as Imelda Papin
- Jeorge "ER" Ejercito Estregan as President Ferdinand Marcos
- Alice Dixson as Imelda Marcos
- Gary Estrada as Bong Carrion
- Angelica Jones as Alona Alegre
- Maffi Papin Carrion as herself
- Aileen Papin as Gloria Papin
- Blumark
- Zac Papin
- Kanisha Santos
- Amay Bisaya
- Marcos Mamay
- Gary Valenciano as Ninoy Aquino
- Angel Aquino as Corazon Aquino
- Joel Torre as Ramon Mitra Jr.
- Jim Pebanco as Juan Ponce Enrile
- Jett Pangan as Fidel V. Ramos
- Elmo Magalona as Bongbong Marcos
- Erich Gonzales as Imee Marcos
- Sofia Andres as Irene Marcos

== Production ==
Loyalista was first revealed to be in production by singer Imelda Papin on February 5, 2023, during an interview with PEP.ph, with Papin intending to produce the film. Actor E. R. Ejercito and director Gabby Ramos later gave their own announcements through Facebook on February 9, 2023. During an interview with vloggers on February 27, Ejercito revealed that Alice Dixson has been cast as Imelda Marcos, which was confirmed by Dixson on March 29. By April 16, the director stated that the film was halfway through production.

A preview for the film was held in October 2023 at the Mowelfund Plaza in Quezon City.

== Release ==
Loyalista premiered at SM Megamall in Cinemas 1, 2 and 3 on November 29, 2023.

In April 2024, producer Imelda Papin revealed that the film has been retitled Imelda Papin: The Untold Story in order to better appeal to her fans worldwide that are not supporters of the Marcos family.
