= Amay Bisaya =

Filipino actor and politician (1958–2025)

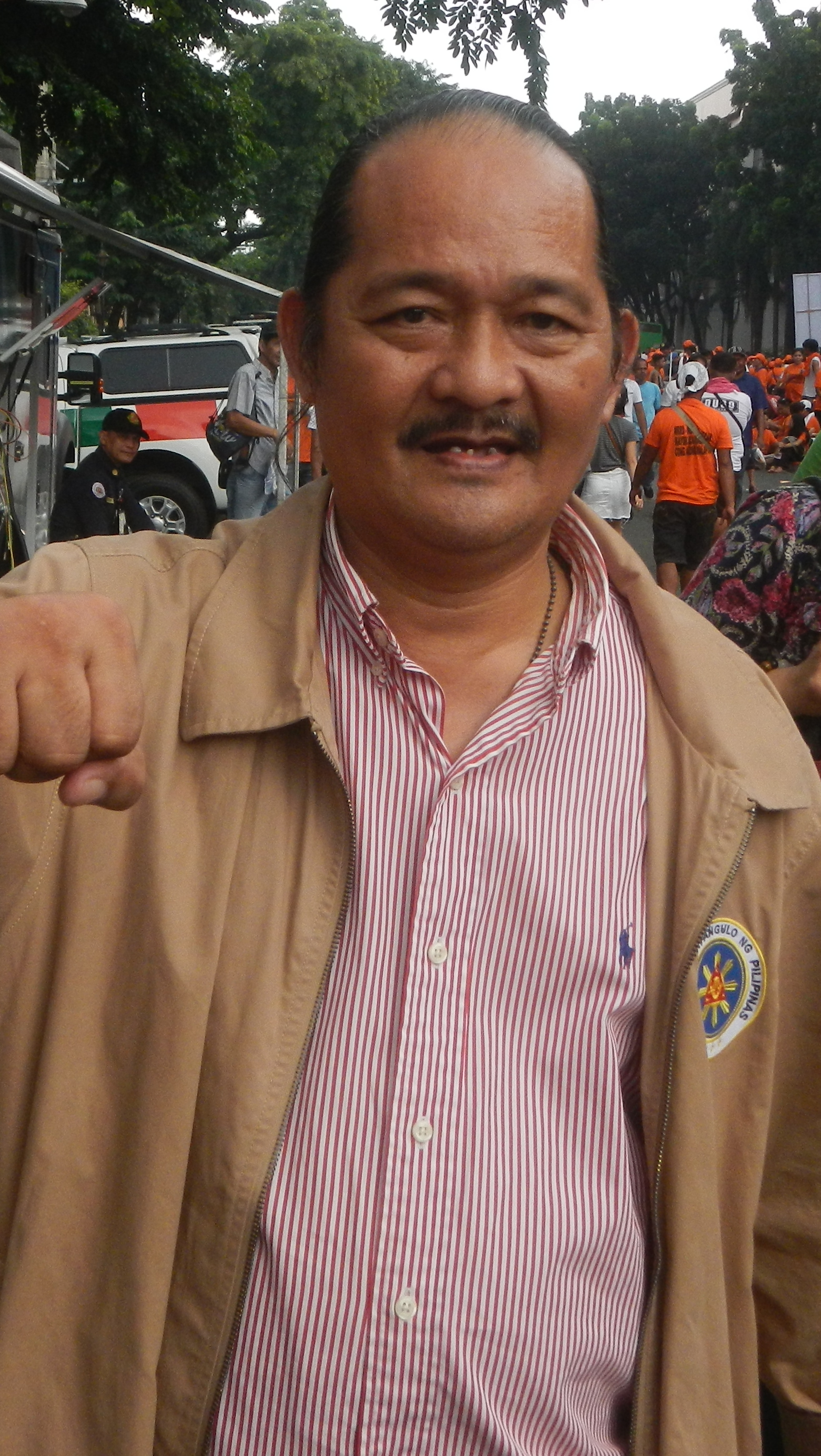
- Bisaya in 2017
- Born: Amay Roberto Gloria Reyes; April 3, 1958; Tubigon, Bohol, Philippines
- Died: May 8, 2025 (aged 67); Quezon City, Philippines
- Occupations: Actor, comedian, politician
- Years active: 1972–2025

Amay Roberto Gloria Reyes (April 3, 1958 – May 8, 2025), most widely known by his screen name Amay Bisaya, was a Filipino actor, comedian and politician. He rose to prominence for his numerous comedic supporting roles, often as a sidekick, in a vast array of Filipino action and comedy films. His distinct Visayan accent and unique brand of humor made him a recognizable and beloved figure in Philippine cinema for over five decades.

== Early life and education ==
Amay Roberto Reyes was born on April 3, 1958, in Tubigon, Bohol, Philippines.

== Career ==
=== Acting ===
Amay Bisaya's acting career began in 1972. He started as a production utility boy before being discovered by prominent figures in the industry, including Fernando Poe Jr., who is credited with giving him his initial breaks.

He became a staple in Philippine action and comedy films, often typecast as the loyal and sometimes bumbling sidekick to lead action stars. His trademark Visayan accent was a key element of his on-screen persona and contributed to his stage name, "Amay Bisaya." He was known for his "kitsch and slapstick type of comedy," which resonated with Filipino audiences.

=== Actors' Guild involvement ===
Beyond his acting roles, Amay Bisaya was actively involved in the welfare of his colleagues in the entertainment industry. He served as the VP Internal Affairs of the Katipunan ng mga Artistang Pilipino sa Pelikula at Telebisyon Inc. (Actors Guild of the Philippines).

=== Political career ===
Amay Bisaya was a supporter of Ferdinand Marcos and participated in the Siege of the Manila Hotel in July 1986 that sought to overthrow the government of president Corazon Aquino and restore Marcos to power. Amay Bisaya himself ventured into politics, running for mayor of Tubigon, Bohol in 1988, for Vice Mayor of Manila in 2001, for Governor of Bohol in the 2013 and 2019 elections. He also pursued a senatorial seat under the Kilusang Bagong Lipunan (KBL) party. Despite his efforts, he was unsuccessful in his political bids, and was fined in 2016 for failing to properly disclose his campaign finances in 2013.

== Death ==
Bisaya died in Quezon City on May 8, 2025, at the age of 67. His death was caused by complications from diabetes, with reports also indicating he suffered a stroke.

== Filmography ==
=== Film ===
- Nardong Putik (Kilabot ng Cavite) (1972)
- Langit Ko... ang Pag-ibig Mo (1975)
- Berdugo ng Maton (1977)
- Buhay Artista Ngayon (1979)
- Dolphy's Angels (1980)
- John & Marsha '80 (1980)
- Kosa (1980)
- Stariray (1981)
- Deadly Brothers (1981)
- Bandido sa Sapang Bato (1981)
- Alyas Big Boy (1982)
- Pepeng Kaliwete (1982)
- Manedyer... si Kumander (1982)
- Daniel Bartolo ng Sapang Bato (1982)
- Si Ako At... Tres Muskiteros! (1982)
- Himala (1982)
- Naiibang Hayop (1983)
- Kirot (1983)
- Kapag Buhay Ang Inutang (1983)
- Isang Bala Ka Lang! (1983)
- Sa Ngalan Ng Anak (1984)
- Kapitan Inggo (1984)
- Da Best in da West (1984)
- Ang Padrino (1984)
- Working Boys (1985)
- Nagalit ang Patay sa Haba ng Lamay (1985)
- Anak ng Tundo (1985)
- Diary of a Killer (1985)
- Oras Ng Kagitingan (1986)
- Cobrador (1986)
- Payaso (1986)
- Lost and Found Command: Rebels Without Because (1987)
- May Butas sa Dingding (1988)
- Alega Gang: Public Enemy No. 1 of Cebu (1988)
- Mirror, Mirror on the Wall (1988)
- Pepeng Kuryente: Man with a Thousand Volts (1988) – Bisaya
- Boots Oyson: Sa Katawan Mo, Aagos ang Dugo (1989)
- Tondo: Libingan ng mga Siga (1992)
- Sa Nag-aapoy Na Dagat (1997)
- Kesong Puti (1999)
- Ang Darling Kong Aswang (2009)
- Si Agimat at si Enteng Kabisote (2010)
- Ang Panday 2 (2011)
- Manila Kingpin: The Asiong Salonga Story (2011)
- Gangster Lolo (2014)
- Manila's Finest (2015) – Snatcher
- Nagalit ang Patay sa Haba ng Lamay: Da Resbak (2023)
- Imelda Papin: The Untold Story (2023)
