= Joey Hizon =

Filipino politician (1958–2016)

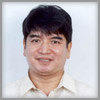
- Official portrait, 2004

Member of the Philippine House of Representatives from Manila's 5th congressional district
- In office June 30, 1998 – June 30, 2007
- Preceded by: Amado Bagatsing
- Succeeded by: Amado Bagatsing

Member of the City Council of Manila from 5th district
- In office June 30, 1992 – June 30, 1998

Personal details
- Born: Jose Dungao Hizon, Jr. July 21, 1958 Manila, Philippines
- Died: November 15, 2016 (aged 58) Manila, Philippines
- Citizenship: Filipino
- Party: PMP (2015–2016)
- Other political affiliations: Nacionalista (2006–2015); LDP (2004–2006); Liberal (1998–2004); PRP (1992–1998)
- Spouse: Lita Hizon
- Occupation: Politician

Jose "Joey" Dungao Hizon Jr. (July 21, 1958 – November 15, 2016) was a Filipino politician from Manila, Philippines.

== Political career ==
Hizon started his political career in Manila as city councilor in 1992 until 1998. In 1998, he ran as congressman for fifth district and won. He managed to retain his seat in 2001, and 2004 elections which he defeated councilor Kim Atienza and two others.

In 2007 elections, Hizon was picked by then-Senator Alfredo Lim as his running mate. While Lim won, Hizon lost to former actor and three-term councilor Isko Moreno Domagoso.

In 2010 and 2016, he attempted to return to his congressional post, but lost to Amado Bagatsing and his daughter Cristal, respectively.

== Personal life ==
Hizon was married to Lita Hizon. His sons Joey III (also known as TJ) and Jaybee are also in politics, having served as members of the Manila City Council in separate instances.

== Death ==
Hizon died on November 15, 2016.

== Electoral performance ==
=== 2016 ===
2016 Philippine House of Representatives election in the 5th District of Manila
Party	Candidate	Votes	%
KABAKA	Cristal Bagatsing	48,380	37.40
PMP	Joey Hizon	34,952	27.02
NPC	Mary Ann Susano	27,083	20.93
Liberal	Josefina Siscar	16,420	12.69
PDP–Laban	Jupakar Arabani	1,882	1.45
WPP	Mario Cayabyab	655	0.51
Total votes		129,372	100.00
KABAKA hold			

=== 2010 ===
Philippine House of Representatives election at Manila's 5th district
Party	Candidate	Votes	%
KABAKA	Amado Bagatsing	70,852	59.04
Nacionalista	Joey Hizon	47,902	39.92
Independent	Rodicindo Yee Rodriguez II	626	0.52
Independent	Jayson Española	618	0.52
Valid ballots		119,998	92.92
Invalid or blank votes		9,148	7.08
Total votes		129,147	100.00
Lakas–Kampi hold			

=== 2007 ===
2007 Manila vice mayoral election
Party	Candidate	Votes	%
Asenso	Isko Moreno (Francisco Domagoso)	176,215	32.71
Nacionalista	Joey Hizon	166,169	30.85
Liberal	Don Ramon Bagatsing (Atienza wing)	147,978	27.47
Liberal	Grepor "Butch" Belgica (Drilon wing)	21,021	3.90
Independent	Cita Astals	13,062	2.42
Aksyon	Roberto Ortega Jr.	11,688	2.17
Independent	Onofre Abad	1,001	0.19
Independent	Joey Yepez	871	0.16
KBL	Samuel Gabot	334	0.06
KBL	Francisco Pizarra	253	0.05
Independent	Jose Oyay	100	0.02
Total votes		538,692	100.00
Asenso hold			

=== 2004 ===
2004 Philippine House of Representatives election at Manila's 5th district
Party	Candidate	Votes	%
LDP	Joey Hizon	65,524	53.35
Liberal	Kim Atienza	56,592	46.07
Independent	Gloria Wilma Encarnacion	505	0.41
Independent	Junel Alvarado	207	0.17
Total votes		122,828	100.00
LDP hold			
