= 2007 Manila local elections =

14th Mayoral election in the City of Manila

2007 Manila mayoral election
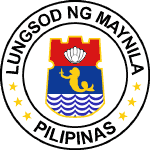
- May 14, 2007
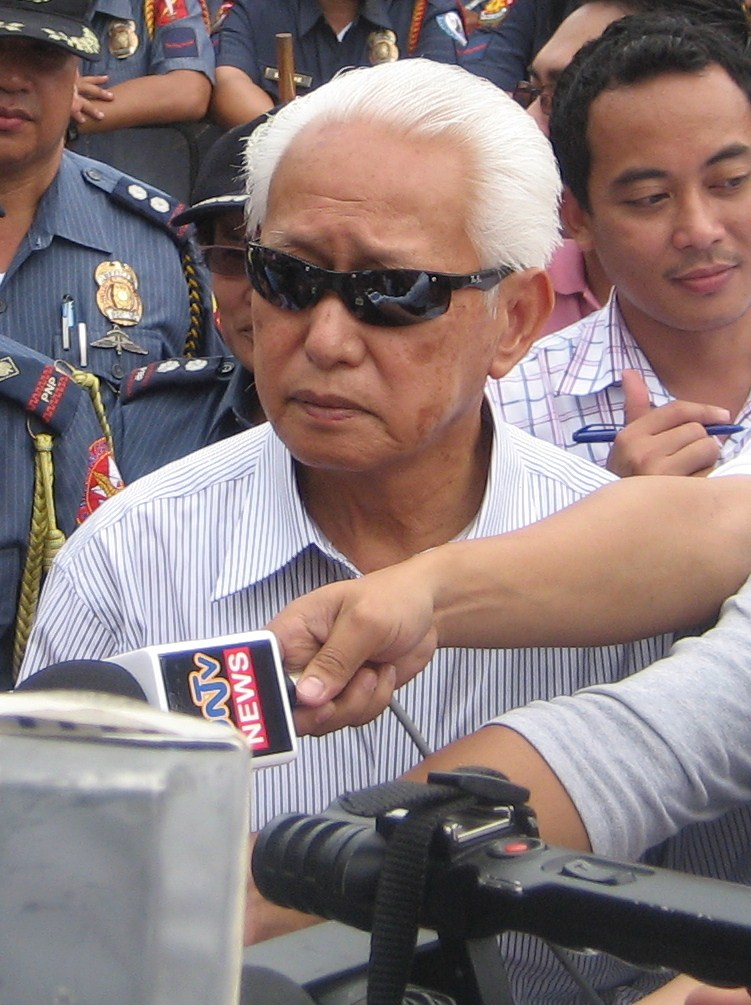

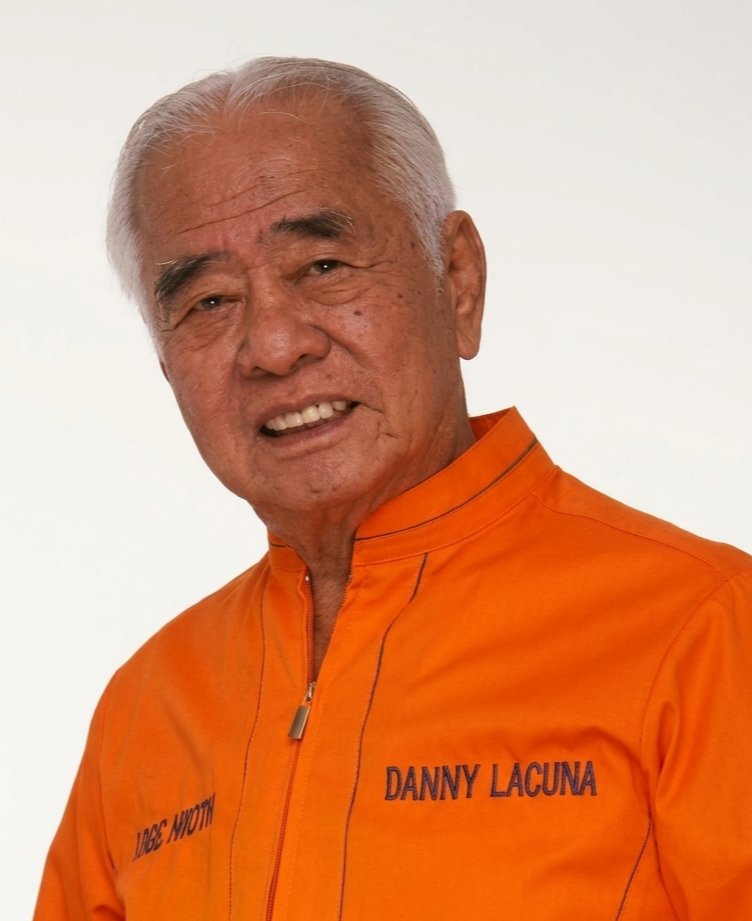
Nominee	Alfredo Lim	Ali Atienza	Danny Lacuna
Party	PMP	Liberal (Atienza wing)	Asenso
Alliance	KKK	Buhayin ang MayniLA	PDP–Laban
Running mate	Joey Hizon (Nacionalista)	Don Ramon Bagatsing	Isko Moreno
Popular vote	207,881	163,111	143,517
Percentage	37.82	29.68	26.11
Mayor before election
Lito Atienza
Liberal
Elected mayor
Alfredo Lim
PMP
- Vice mayoral election
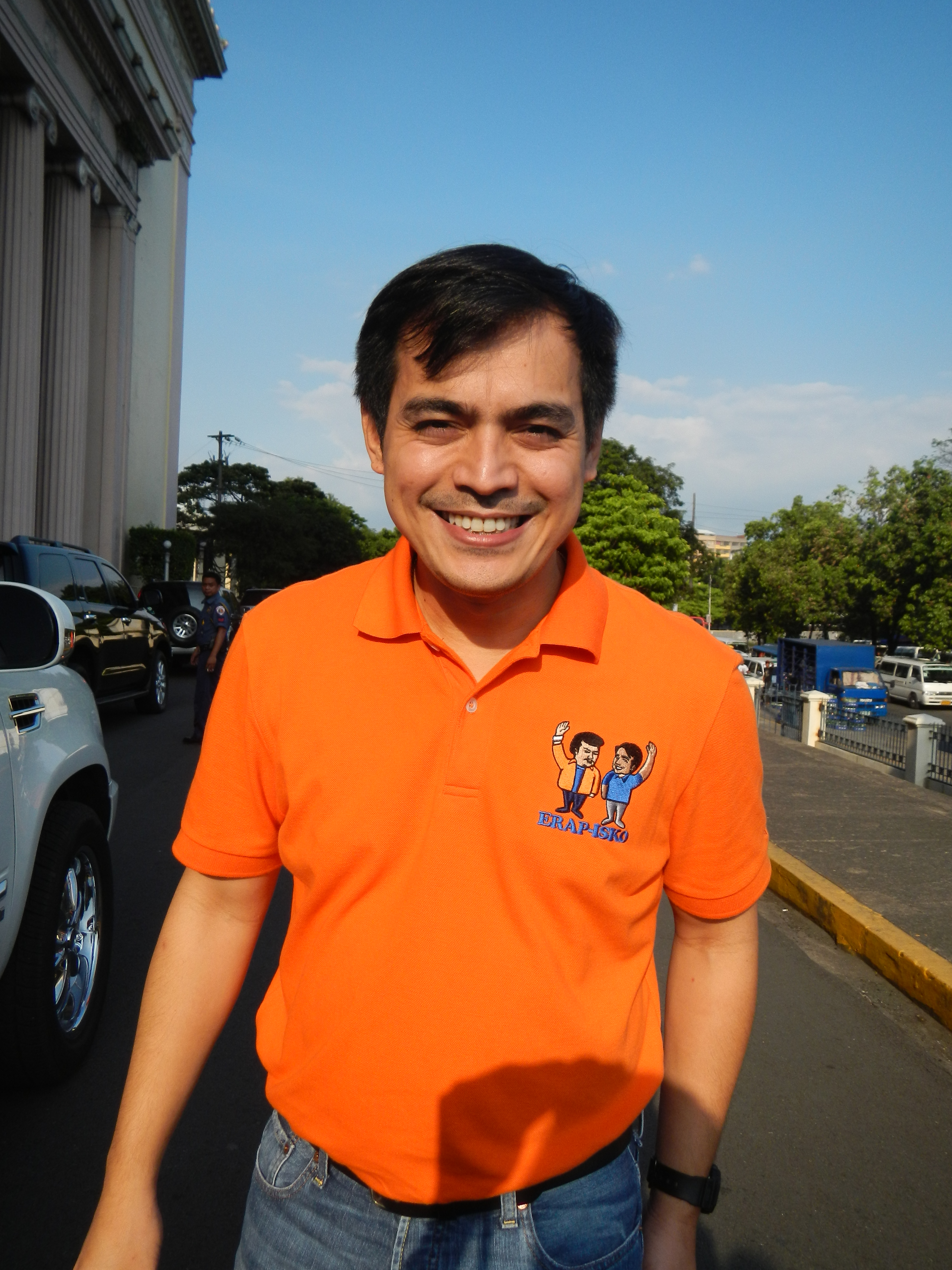

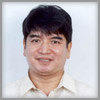
Candidate	Isko Moreno	Joey Hizon	Don Ramon Bagatsing
Party	Asenso	Nacionalista	Liberal (Atienza wing)
Alliance	PDP–Laban	KKK	Buhayin ang MayniLA
Popular vote	176,215	166,169	147,978
Percentage	32.71	30.85	27.47
Vice Mayor before election
Danny Lacuna
Asenso
Elected Vice Mayor
Isko Moreno
Asenso
- City Council election

36 of 38 seats in the Manila City Council 20 seats needed for a majority
	First party	Second party	Third party
Party	Liberal	Lakas	PDP–Laban
Alliance	Buhayin ang MayniLA	Buhayin ang MayniLA	Asenso
Seats won	24	3	4

Local elections was held in the City of Manila on May 14, 2007, within the Philippine general election. The voters elected for the elective local posts in the city: the mayor, vice mayor, the six Congressmen, and the councilors, six in each of the city's six legislative districts.

== Background ==
Mayor Jose "Lito" Atienza was term-limited. His son, Arnold "Ali" Atienza ran for his place instead. Atienza was challenged by former Mayor and Senator Alfredo Lim, Vice Mayor Danilo Lacuna, and three-termer Rep. Rodolfo Bacani of Fourth District.

Vice Mayor Danilo "Danny" Lacuna Sr. was term-limited. He ran for mayor. His place was contested by former actor and three-termer Councilor Francisco "Isko" Moreno Domagoso, three-termer Rep. Joey Hizon of Fifth District, and Don Ramon Bagatsing.

== Results ==
=== For Mayor ===
Former Mayor and Senator Alfredo Lim defeated Ali Atienza and Vice Mayor Danilo "Danny" Lacuna Sr.

Manila Mayoral election
Party	Candidate	Votes	%
PMP	Alfredo "Fred" Lim	207,881	37.82
Liberal	Arnold "Ali" Atienza (Atienza wing)	163,111	29.68
Asenso	Danilo "Danny" Lacuna Sr.	143,517	26.11
Liberal	Rodolfo "Rudy" Bacani (Drilon wing)	27,187	5.06
Aksyon	Maria Teresita Alsua	6,498	1.18
Independent	Valeriano Reloj	386	0.07
Independent	Eduardo Fernandez	234	0.04
Independent	Norma Magat	125	0.02
Independent	Benjamin Rivera	56	0.01
KBL	Remedios Oyales	18	0.00
Total votes		549,643	100.00
PMP gain from Liberal			

=== For Vice Mayor ===
First District Councilor and former actor Francisco "Isko" Moreno Domagoso defeated his opponents Rep. Joey Hizon, Don Ramon Bagatsing, and Councilor Cita Astals.

Manila vice mayoral election
Party	Candidate	Votes	%
Asenso	Isko Moreno (Francisco Domagoso)	176,215	32.71
Nacionalista	Joey Hizon	166,169	30.85
Liberal	Don Ramon Bagatsing (Atienza wing)	147,978	27.47
Liberal	Grepor "Butch" Belgica (Drilon wing)	21,021	3.90
Independent	Cita Astals	13,062	2.42
Aksyon	Roberto Ortega Jr.	11,688	2.17
Independent	Onofre Abad	1,001	0.19
Independent	Joey Yepez	871	0.16
KBL	Samuel Gabot	334	0.06
KBL	Francisco Pizarra	253	0.05
Independent	Jose Oyay	100	0.02
Total votes		538,692	100.00
Asenso hold			

=== For Representatives ===
==== First District ====
2007 Philippine House of Representatives election at Manila's 1st district
Party	Candidate	Votes	%
PDP–Laban	Benjamin "Atong" Asilo	41,870	33.92
Liberal	Ernesto "Dionix" Dionisio Sr. (Atienza wing)	26,967	21.84
NPC	Manuel Luis "Manny" Lopez	25,009	20.26
Liberal	Martin "Marjun" Isidro Jr. (Drilon wing)	21,615	17.51
Aksyon	Irma "Dra. Ching" Alfonso-Juson	7,989	6.47
Total votes		123,450	100.00
PDP–Laban gain from Lakas			

==== Second District ====
2007 Philippine House of Representatives election at Manila's 2nd district
Party	Candidate	Votes	%
Lakas	Jaime "Jim" Lopez	42,389	53.61
Liberal	Ruben "Dr. J" Buenaventura (Atienza wing)	24,267	30.69
Liberal	Edward Tan (Drilon wing)	12,415	15.70
Total votes		79,071	100.00
Lakas hold			

==== Third District ====
2007 Philippine House of Representatives election at Manila's 3rd district
Party	Candidate	Votes	%
NPC	Ma. Zenaida "Naida" Angping	33,427	41.99
Liberal	Miles Andrew Roces (Atienza wing)	21,090	26.49
PDP–Laban	Maria Asuncion "Re" Fugoso	20,148	25.31
Liberal	Alex Co (Drilon wing)	4,938	6.20
Total votes		79,603	100.00
NPC gain from Liberal			

==== Fourth District ====
2007 Philippine House of Representatives election at Manila's 4th district
Party	Candidate	Votes	%
Lakas	Ma. Theresa "Trisha" Bonoan-David	38,030	42.83
Liberal	Ramon "Dondon" Bagatsing Jr. (Atienza wing)	28,765	32.39
Liberal	Maria Aurora "Boots" Bacani (Drilon wing)	15,621	17.59
Ang Kapatiran	Gerardo "Gerry" Gamez	6,379	7.18
Total votes		88,795	100.00
Lakas gain from Liberal			

==== Fifth District ====
2007 Philippine House of Representatives election at Manila's 5th district
Party	Candidate	Votes	%
KAMPI	Amado Bagatsing	42,138	38.77
Liberal	Juan Miguel "Mitch" Cuna (Atienza wing)	36,023	33.14
Nacionalista	Estrelita "Lita" Hizon	24,338	22.39
Aksyon	Richard "Ric" Ibay	5,539	5.10
Independent	Jose Maria "Joey" Serrano Jr.	440	0.40
Liberal	Juliet "Jett" Villegas (Drilon wing)	207	0.19
Total votes		108,685	100.00
KAMPI gain from Nacionalista			

==== Sixth District ====
2007 Philippine House of Representatives election at Manila's 6th district
Party	Candidate	Votes	%
Lakas	Bienvenido "Benny" Abante Jr.	40,371	45.31
Aksyon	Casimiro "Cassy" Sison	35,089	39.38
UNO	Carlos "Ping" Fernandez	10,442	11.72
Independent	Prudencio Jalandoni	3,060	3.43
PGRP	Arnold "Nold" Baltazar	140	0.16
Total votes		89,102	100.00
Lakas hold			

=== For Councilors ===
==== First District ====
Manila City Council Election for First District
Party	Candidate	Votes	%
Liberal	Ernesto "Ernix" Dionisio Jr.	56,244	
Liberal	Erick Ian "Banzai" Nieva	55,540	
Liberal	Dennis Alcoreza	43,076	
Liberal	Moises Lim	41,780	
Aksyon	Arlene Koa	32,254	
Liberal	Rolando Sy	28,630	
Total votes			100.00

==== Second District ====
Manila City Council Election for Second District
Party	Candidate	Votes	%
Liberal	Marlon Lacson	50,358	
Lakas	Rolan Valeriano	49,907	
Liberal	Abelardo "Abel" Viceo	48,284	
Liberal	Numero "Uno" Lim	41,113	
Liberal	Ivy Varona	40,329	
Lakas	Carlo Lopez	39,839	
Total votes			100.00

==== Third District ====
Manila City Council Election for Third District
Party	Candidate	Votes	%
Liberal	Manuel "Letlet" Zarcal	44,554	
PDP–Laban	Ernesto "Jong" Isip Jr.	37,761	
Liberal	Monina Silva	32,063	
Lakas	Joel Chua	31,728	
PDP–Laban	John Marvin "Yul Servo" Nieto	31,220	
Liberal	Ramon "Mon" Morales	27,946	
Total votes			100.00

==== Fourth District ====
Manila City Council Election for Fourth District
Party	Candidate	Votes	%
UNO	Edward Maceda	51,479	
Liberal	Victoriano "Vic" Melendez	47,990	
PDP–Laban	Maria Sheilah "Honey" Lacuna-Pangan	45,279	
Liberal	Jocelyn "Jo" Quintos	42,822	
Liberal	Amalia "Amy" Tolentino	37,647	
Liberal	Louisito "Louie" Chua	33,712	
Total votes			100.00

==== Fifth District ====
Manila City Council Election for Fifth District
Party	Candidate	Votes	%
Liberal	Corazon "Cora" Gernale	39,022	
Liberal	Cristina "Cristy" Isip	38,479	
Nacionalista	Josie Siscar	38,030	
Liberal	Raymundo "Mon" Yupangco	30,642	
Liberal	Rafael Borromeo	29,208	
KAMPI	Roderick "Erick" Valbuena	24,741	
Nacionalista	Pablo "Chikee" Ocampo IV	19,593	
Total votes			100.00

==== Sixth District ====
Manila City Council Election for Sixth District
Party	Candidate	Votes	%
Liberal	Luis "Joey" Uy	47,926	
Aksyon	Luciano "Lou" Veloso	45,801	
PDP–Laban	Danilo Victor "Dennis" Lacuna Jr.	41,525	
Liberal	Maria Lourdes "Bonjay" Isip-Garcia	40,887	
Liberal	Jocelyn "Joy" Dawis-Asuncion	40,388	
Liberal	Ernesto "Ernie" Rivera	36,274	
Liberal	Carlos "Caloy" Castaneda	36,288	
Liberal	Julio "Ging" Logarta	35,737	
Liberal	Greco Belgica	33,675	
Total votes			100.00
