= Alfredo Lim =

Filipino police officer and politician (1929–2020)

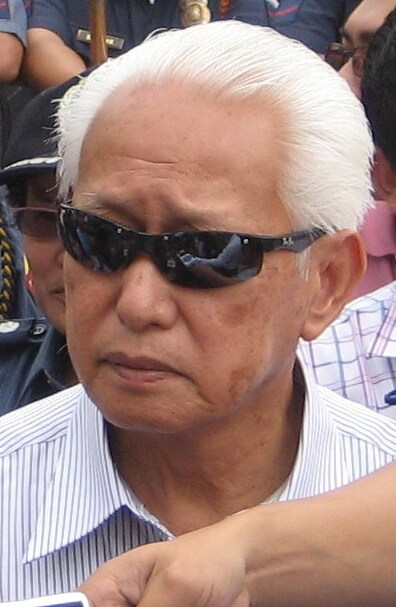
- Mayor Lim in 2008

23rd and 25th Mayor of Manila
- In office June 30, 2007 – June 30, 2013
- Vice Mayor: Isko Moreno
- Preceded by: Lito Atienza
- Succeeded by: Joseph Estrada
- In office June 30, 1992 – March 27, 1998
- Vice Mayor: Lito Atienza
- Preceded by: Mel Lopez
- Succeeded by: Lito Atienza

Senator of the Philippines
- In office June 30, 2004 – June 29, 2007 (Note: Original term until June 30, 2010; resigned to sit as Manila mayor.)

33rd Secretary of the Interior and Local Government
- In office January 8, 2000 – January 20, 2001
- President: Joseph Estrada
- Preceded by: Ronaldo Puno
- Succeeded by: Jose Lina Jr.

11th Director of the National Bureau of Investigation
- In office 1989–1992
- Appointed by: Corazon Aquino
- Preceded by: Jesus Antonio Carpio
- Succeeded by: Epimaco Velasco

District Director of the Western Police District
- In office May 2, 1986 – December 21, 1989
- Mayor: Mel Lopez; Gregorio Ejercito
- Preceded by: P/Brig. Gen. Narciso M. Cabrera
- Succeeded by: P/Brig. Gen. Ernesto Diokno

Personal details
- Born: Alfredo Siojo Lim; December 21, 1929 Tondo, Manila, Philippine Islands
- Died: August 8, 2020 (aged 90) Manila, Philippines
- Resting place: Manila North Cemetery, Santa Cruz, Manila, Philippines
- Party: PDP–Laban (2018–2020); KKK (local party; 2001–2020)
- Other political affiliations: PRP (1992–1998); Liberal (1998; 2008–2018); PMP (1998–2008)
- Spouse(s): Amalia Santos (m. 1951; died 1994) Gemma Alivio
- Children: 12, including Cristina and Manuel
- Education: University of the East (BS, LL.B.); National Defense College of the Philippines (MNSA); Philippine College of Criminology (PhD)
- Occupation: Police officer, politician, lawyer
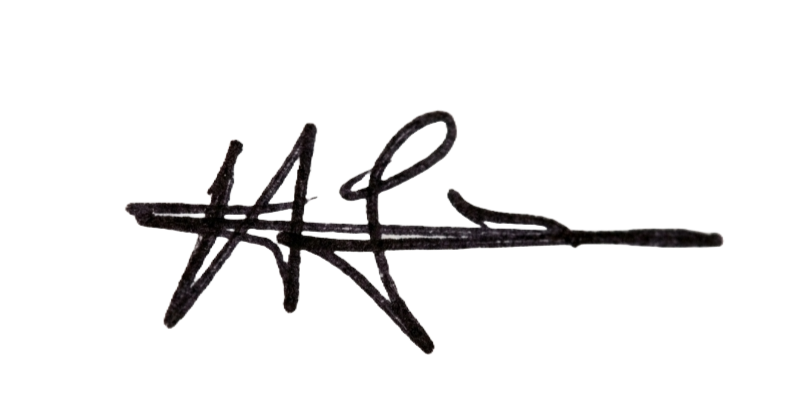
- Signature
- Website: Official website
- Police career
- Service: Integrated National Police
- Allegiance: Philippines
- Divisions: Western Police District
- Service years: 1952–1989
- Rank: Police Major General

Chinese name
- Traditional Chinese: 林雯洛
- Simplified Chinese: 林雯洛
Transcriptions
Standard Mandarin
- Hanyu Pinyin: Lín Wénluò
Southern Min
- Hokkien POJ: Lîm Bûn-lo̍k

Alfredo "Fred" Siojo Lim (Chinese: 林雯洛; pinyin: Lín Wénluò; Pe̍h-ōe-jī: Lîm Bûn-lo̍k; December 21, 1929 – August 8, 2020) was a Filipino politician, police officer and lawyer who served as a Senator of the Philippines from 2004 to 2007, He also served as the 23rd and 25th Mayor of Manila twice: first from 1992 to 1998, and again from 2007 to 2013.

Prior to entering politics, Lim was a policeman for three decades. During the administration of President Corazon Aquino, he was appointed the Director of the National Bureau of Investigation (NBI), serving from 1989 to 1992. In 1992, he was elected Mayor of Manila, serving for two consecutive terms. He then unsuccessfully ran for president in 1998. Two years later, in 2000, he was appointed by President Joseph Estrada as the Secretary of the Interior and Local Government (DILG).

In 2001, he ran again for mayor of Manila but lost to then-incumbent Lito Atienza. In the 2004 elections, he ran for senator and won. Three years into his tenure in the Senate, he resigned in order to run for mayor of Manila, which he won and served two consecutive terms from 2007 to 2013. He then lost the 2013 and 2016 mayoral elections to former president Estrada. In 2019, both Lim and Estrada lost the mayoralty elections to Isko Moreno, who served as vice mayor during the two former mayors' respective terms.

Due to his tough stance against suspected criminals, Lim earned the nickname "Dirty Harry", and has been depicted numerous times in local action films within his lifetime.

== Early life and career ==
Lim was born on December 21, 1929, at the Emmanuel Community Hospital along Calle Manuguit, Tondo, Manila, to Rosario Siojo, a Filipina with Chinese ancestry from the Siojo family of San Miguel, Bulacan. His father, Alfredo Ko Lim Sr., returned to his hometown Antique. When he was in pre-school, his mother remarried and left him at the Hospicio de San Jose. When he was in the third grade, he was put under the care of his maternal grandmother, Flora Valisno-Siojo. After his grandmother's death in 1943, he lived with his godmother, Dolores La'o-Conde.

He finished primary school as a salutatorian at the P. Gomez Elementary School in 1943. Lim graduated high school in 1948 at the Far Eastern University. He earned a degree of business administration in 1951 and a Bachelor of Law in 1963 at the University of the East. In 1981, he finished his master's degree in national security administration with honours at the National Defense College of the Philippines and pursued a Doctor of Philosophy in criminology at the Philippine College of Criminology where he graduated in 1996.

When Lim began work in the police in the 1952, one of his first accomplishments was arresting future senator Robert Barbers for illegal possession of firearms. Then Manila Vice Mayor James Barbers, Robert's uncle, tried to negotiate with Lim to release Robert Barbers without charges, but Lim nevertheless proceeded to file charges. A decorated police officer, Lim earned around 400 commendations and 40 awards. During the late 1980s, Lim helped defend the government of then-President Corazon Aquino, such as leading the retaking of government installations from military rebels during one of the 1987 coup attempts. After retiring from the police, Lim was appointed Director of the National Bureau of Investigation, where he lobbied for more funding and pay increases for agents and other employees. Since regular agents had to be fairly half of the force's positions were vacant, and there were few takers because of the low salary. Lim also lobbied for the position of special investigator which was realized to complement regular agents.

== Political career ==
=== Mayor of Manila (1992–1998) ===
In 1992, Lim beat six opponents in the election to become mayor of the city of Manila. As mayor, he worked on a strong law and order program which lessened crime. Lim worked on some projects to improve the city's image which had been bad when he assumed office. He pushed reforms in the city government. His slogan was "Magaling na Lider, Disiplinado" (lit. transl. "Excellent Leader, Disciplined").

Lim was re-elected in 1995. During his first two terms in office, he earned the nickname "Dirty Harry" for his tough anti-crime policies against suspected and convicted drug pushers, drug runners, and the city's red light districts, among others. He founded the City College of Manila that would serve to complement Pamantasan ng Lungsod ng Maynila. It was under his administration when the Gat Andres Bonifacio Memorial Medical Center in Tondo was established in 1997. He resigned on March 27, 1998, to focus on his presidential campaign.

=== Presidential run and DILG Secretary (1998–2001) ===
Lim ran a failed bid for the presidency as the Liberal Party nominee in the 1998 election, garnering only 8.7% of the vote and finishing fifth in a field of eleven candidates.

In January 2000, his rival in the presidential election, President Joseph Estrada, appointed him as Secretary of the Interior and Local Government. His stint was cut short when Estrada was ousted during the second EDSA Revolution the following year.

=== 2001 mayoral elections ===
Lim sought a comeback for mayor of Manila in 2001. However, he lost to incumbent Mayor Lito Atienza, his former ally and vice mayor.

=== Senator (2004–2007) ===
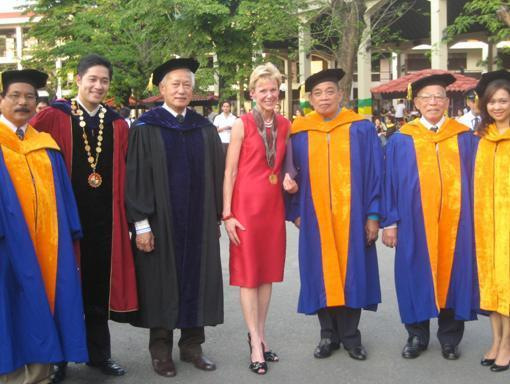
Manila Mayor Alfredo Lim (3rd from left) together with US Ambassador to the Philippines Kristie Kenney (4th from left) and some members of the Board of Regents and Administrative Staff of Pamantasan ng Lungsod ng Maynila

Lim was elected to a six-year term as Senator in the 2004 election under PMP and the banner of the Koalisyon ng Nagkakaisang Pilipino (KNP). As a senator, Lim introduced legislation to bring back mandatory ROTC, but this bill did not receive any co-sponsors.

=== Return as mayor (2007–2013) ===
In 2007, Lim decided to run again for Mayor of Manila. He won and defeated Atienza's son, Ali Atienza; he thus gave up his Senate seat. Shortly after assuming office, he adopted the slogan "Linisin, Ikarangal (ang) Maynila" (transl. Clean, Dignify Manila, hence the acronym LIM). He ended the ban on holding rallies at Mendiola, which was initiated by his predecessor Lito Atienza, later modifying it by allowing rallies to be held there on weekends and holidays.

On July 16, 2007, Philippine National Police (PNP) chief General Oscar Calderon asked him to revoke his ban to prevent militants from marching there. The PNP would recommend having protesters take their rallies to freedom parks. Calderon warned that if Lim will not change his position, the PNP will enforce the "no permit, no rally" policy. He ordered the removal of all business establishments, including bars and restaurants, in the Baywalk area along Roxas Boulevard (also another Atienza project) in an attempt to make the area a "wholesome park for everyone", with an unobstructed view of the famed Manila sunset. He claimed that many of these establishments have no business permits and were selling liquor, which is a violation of applicable city ordinances.

In December 2007, he told MMDA Chairman Bayani Fernando not to conduct its sidewalk clearing operations in Manila since vendors were allowed to sell on sidewalks for humanitarian reasons. He stated: "I jokingly told Chairman Fernando that they are welcome anytime but I cannot guarantee their safety. Their problem is how they will get out."

On March 14, 2008, Lim's son, Manuel "Manny" Lim, and two other suspects were arrested in a hotel along Tomas Mapua Street in Santa Cruz, Manila, by PDEA operatives during a buy–bust operation in Binondo. Manny had in his possession 100 grams (3.5 oz) of methamphetamine hydrochloride or shabu worth ₱600,000 (equivalent to ₱902,795 in 2021).

On July 17, 2008, 1st District Councilor Dennis Alcoreza filed human rights complaints before the Commission on Human Rights, against Lim and other officials of the city of Manila. Alcoreza accused Lim of a violent takeover of a slaughterhouse in Tondo on July 11, and illegal dispersal of protest. Meanwhile, 24 councilors resigned from their posts as members and heads of the different committees, prompting a reorganization. The councilors unanimously denounced the violent treatment by Lim's Manila Police District (MPD) towards Alcoreza during the city government's takeover of the slaughterhouse.

Lim resigned as head of Joseph Estrada's Pwersa ng Masang Pilipino (PMP) in August 2008, following an executive committee resolution by the PMP removing him as president of the party. He was replaced by Estrada, who is also the PMP chairman.

In October 2008, he made ROTC training mandatory for all students at the Pamantasan ng Lungsod ng Maynila (PLM) and the City College of Manila (CCM, now the Universidad de Manila (UdM)), both city-owned colleges. He was also credited for the establishment of Santa Ana Hospital in Santa Ana, Manila, which serves residents of Manila's 6th district.

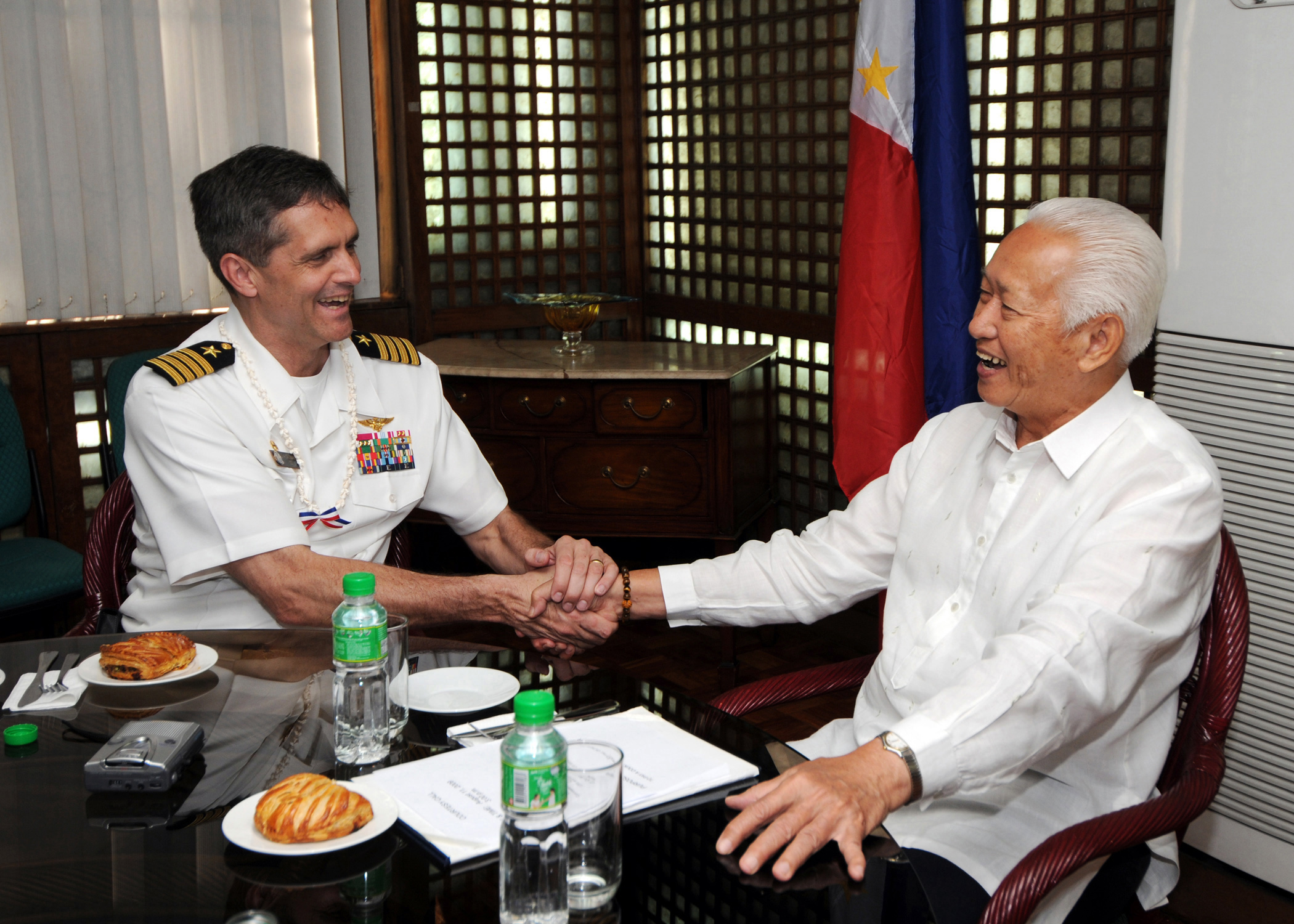
Mayor Lim with USS George Washington Captain David A. Lausman

Lim ran for reelection in 2010, with Vice Mayor Isko Moreno as his running mate. Together, they defeated Lim's predecessor, Atienza, and his running mate, 6th District Councilor Bonjay Isip-Garcia. However, Atienza filed an electoral protest, citing discrepancies in the election returns and the consolidation and canvassing system. He later dropped his protest in January 2013.

On August 23, 2010, former police officer Rolando Mendoza hijacked a tourist bus full of tourists from Hong Kong in order to make demands on the government about a case against him at the Ombudsman that led to his dismissal from service. The government's failure to negotiate properly with Mendoza led to the killing of eight hostages and of Mendoza himself after almost ten hours of stand-off. Justice Secretary Leila De Lima was tasked to lead an investigation on the incident and determine whose negligence led to the tragedy. Her committee, the Incident Investigation and Review Committee (IIRC), found out that there were lapses on the part of Lim that led to the failed resolution of the hostage-drama, thereby recommending the filing of administrative and criminal cases against him and other officials. Malacañang, however, declared Lim's liability was neglect of duty and misconduct. But, according to a report conducted by the late DILG Secretary Jesse Robredo that was released in April 2013, he was found to have been "administratively liable" for the incident.

In 2013, he sought another term as mayor, with actor and 6th District Councilor Lou Veloso as his running mate, but they were defeated by Estrada and Moreno, respectively.

== Later career ==
From 2004 to 2007 during his term as a Senator, Lim anchored the public service radio program Katapat: Mayor Fred Lim at DZMM on DZMM. With his team onboard researcher Joseph Arcaya, Executive Producer Dingdong Marco, DZMM Station Manager Angelo Palmones, and attorney Rey Bagatsing, the radio program helped solve many unsolved cases which became the last resort of the victims of crimes not only in Metro Manila but the entire Philippines. He also anchored Aksyon Ngayon, also on DZMM, with Kaye Dacer.

In 2015, Lim returned to the radio airwaves as co-anchor of Katapat at Karancho, 8TriMedia's morning commentary program aired on DZRJ-AM.

In the 2016 mayoral elections, Lim ran again for mayor of Manila against the incumbent Joseph Estrada, who replaced him in 2013. He chose 1st district congressman Benjamin Asilo and later 5th district councilor Ali Atienza as his running mate for vice mayor, respectively. He lost to Estrada by a margin of 2,685 votes.

Lim attempted another comeback as mayor and ran in the 2019 elections, chasing a fifth non-consecutive term against Estrada again and his former vice-mayor Isko Moreno. This time, Lim had no running mate for vice mayor. However, he placed third and Moreno emerged as the winner in the three-way race of notable candidates. After which, Moreno sought the expertise of Lim to guide his new administration's efforts in revitalizing the city and combating corruption. Lim later appeared during the inauguration of the Flora V. Valisno de Siojo Dialysis Center at the Gat Andres Bonifacio Memorial Medical Center in Tondo on October 24, 2019, which was led by Moreno. Named after Lim's maternal grandmother, it was the Philippines's largest free dialysis facility at the time of its opening.

Lim, when not under the banner of a national political party, used the "Kapayapaan, Kaunlaran at Katarungan" (transl. Peace, Prosperity and Justice) label, the party he founded to stand for election.

== Death ==
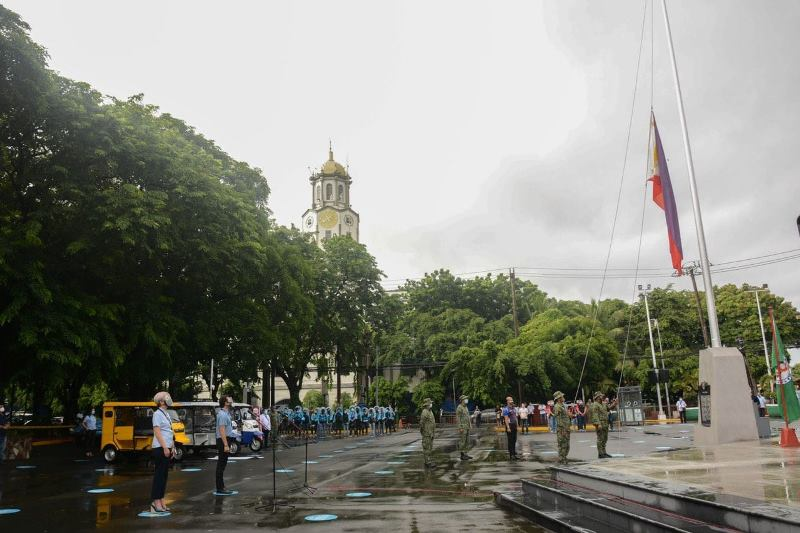
The Philippine flag near the Manila City Hall was flown at half-mast following Lim's death.

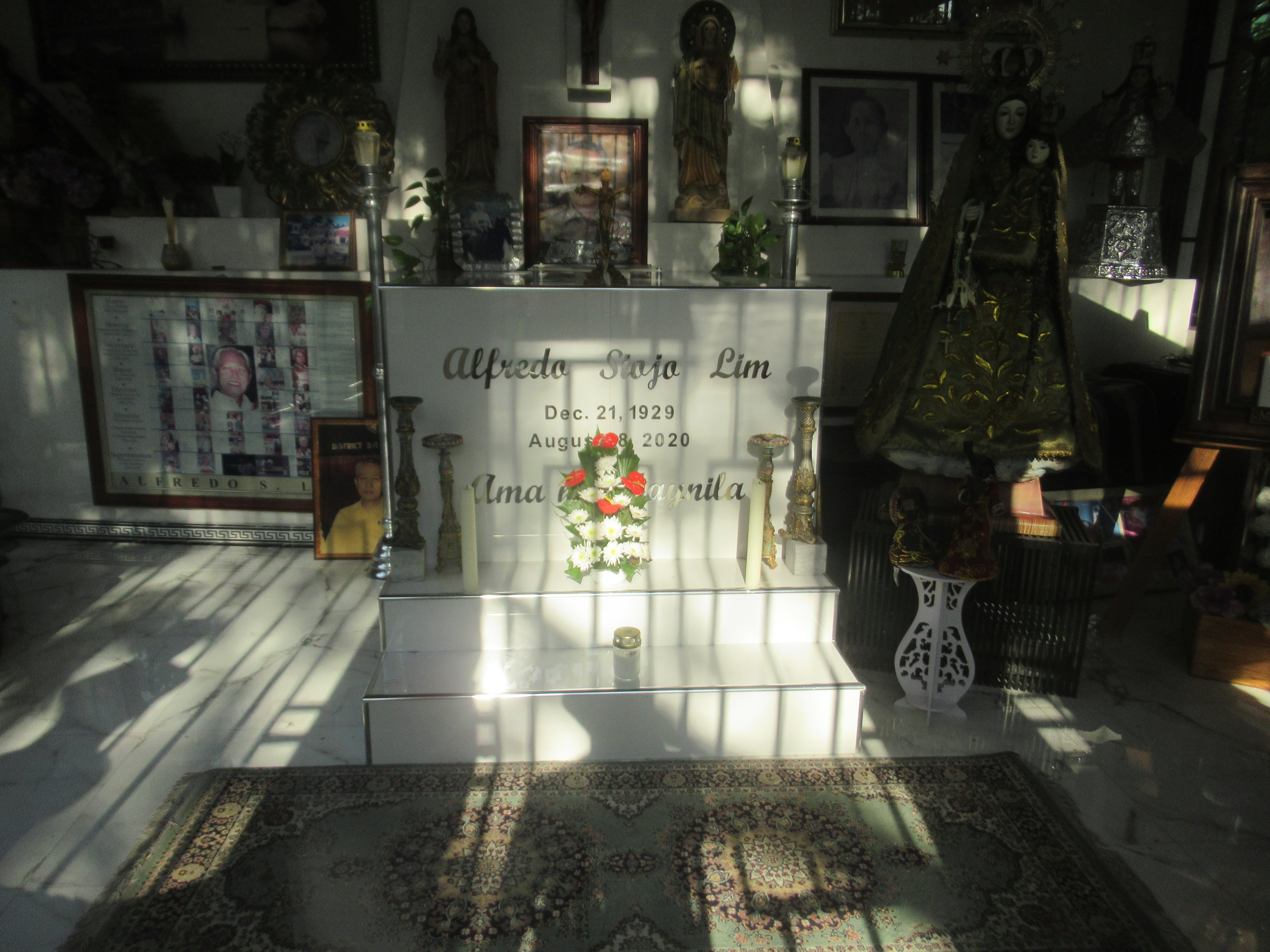
Lim's mausoleum at the Manila North Cemetery.

On August 8, 2020, Lim died after having tested positive for COVID-19 during the COVID-19 pandemic in the Philippines. He was confined in a government-run hospital in Manila prior to his death. His remains were soon cremated at the Arlington Memorial Chapels in Quezon City. On August 29, his remains were brought to the Manila City Hall and Tondo Church for a requiem Mass, and were finally inurned at the Manila North Cemetery.

== Legacy ==
On August 15, 2024, the Manila City Council passed a resolution declaring August 8 of every year as "Mayor Alfredo S. Lim Day."

== Electoral history ==
Electoral history of Alfredo Lim
Year	Office	Party		Votes received				Result
Year	Office	Local	National	Total	%	P.	Swing	Result
1992	Mayor of Manila	—N/a	PRP	241,823	35.23%	1st	—N/a	Won
1995	Mayor of Manila	—N/a	PRP	426,806	—N/a	1st	—N/a	Won
2001	Mayor of Manila	KKK	PMP	199,070	34.20%	2nd	—N/a	Lost
2007	Mayor of Manila	KKK	PMP	207,881	37.92%	1st	+3.72	Won
2010	Mayor of Manila	KKK	Liberal	395,910	59.52%	1st	+21.60	Won
2013	Mayor of Manila	KKK	Liberal	308,544	47.28%	2nd	-12.24	Lost
2016	Mayor of Manila	KKK	Liberal	280,464	38.17%	2nd	-9.11	Lost
2019	Mayor of Manila	KKK	PDP–Laban	138,923	19.46%	3rd	-18.71	Lost
1998	President of the Philippines	—N/a	Liberal	2,344,362	8.71%	5th	—N/a	Lost
2004	Senator of the Philippines	—N/a	PMP	11,286,428	31.78%	8th	—N/a	Won

== In popular culture ==
Lim has appeared in films and television series. He was also portrayed by different actors in several films.

- Portrayed by Rudy Fernandez in the 1977 film Alfredo Lim: Sa Kamay ng Ibabaw.
- Portrayed by Ernie Zarate in the 1989 film Jones Bridge Massacre (Task Force Clabio) and the 1993 film Doring Dorobo: Hagupit ng Batas.
- Portrayed by Ramon Revilla Sr. in the 1989 film Target... Police General (Maj. Gen. Alfredo S. Lim Story).
- Portrayed by Eddie Garcia in the 1995 film Alfredo Lim, Batas ng Maynila.
- Portrayed by Bob Soler in the 1994 film Epimaco Velasco: NBI starring Fernando Poe Jr..
- Portrayed by Lim (himself) in the 1997 film Bobby Barbers: Parak.
- Lim hosted the 1998 TV crime documentary drama series of ABS-CBN's Katapat, Mayor Fred Lim, which was produced by ABS-CBN News and Current Affairs
- Portrayed by Cesar Montano in the 2013 film Alfredo S. Lim (The Untold Story).

== Notes ==
Political offices
Preceded by Mel Lopez	Mayor of Manila; 1992 – 1998	Succeeded by Lito Atienza
Preceded by Antonio M. Carpio	Director of the National Bureau of Investigation; 1989 – 1992	Succeeded by Epimaco Velasco
Preceded by Ronaldo Puno	Secretary of the Interior and Local Government; 2000 – 2001	Succeeded by Joey Lina
Preceded by Lito Atienza	Mayor of Manila; 2007 – 2013	Succeeded by Joseph Estrada
Party political offices
Preceded by Jovito Salonga	Liberal Party nominee for President of the Philippines; 1998	Vacant Title next held by Benigno Aquino III
