= Butch Belgica =

Filipino politician

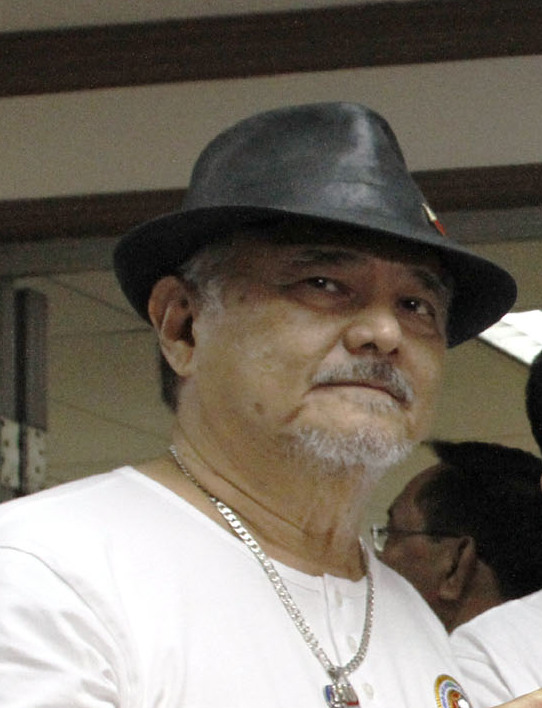
- Belgica in 2018

Member of the Manila City Council from the 6th district
- In office June 30, 1995 – June 30, 1998

Personal details
- Born: Porfirio Banzuela Belgica, Jr. May 25, 1947 (age 79) Manila, Philippines
- Party: PDDS (2018–present)
- Other political affiliations: Independent (2007–2018); Liberal (1998–2007); PRP (1995–1998)
- Spouse: Carmelita Banta
- Children: greco

Porfirio Banzuela Belgica, Jr. (born May 25, 1947), also known as Grepor "Butch" Belgica, is a Filipino politician, pastor and former convicted criminal.

== Political career ==
Belgica was elected in the City Council of Manila in 1995. He was picked by then-interim mayor Lito Atienza to be his running mate in 1998 local elections but lost to Danny Lacuna.

He attempted to run for vice mayor in 2007, as an independent, but lost to then-councilor and future mayor Isko Moreno.

== Popular culture ==
His story was depicted in the 1995 movie The Grepor Butch Belgica Story, co-edited and directed by Toto Natividad. Joko Diaz portrayed Belgica featuring his time as one of the country’s most notorious delinquent during the Marcos administration. It was one of the entries in the 1995 Manila Film Festival.
