= Santa Ana, Manila =

District of Manila, Metro Manila, Philippines

Coordinates: 14.580°N 121.012°E

Santa Ana
- District of Manila
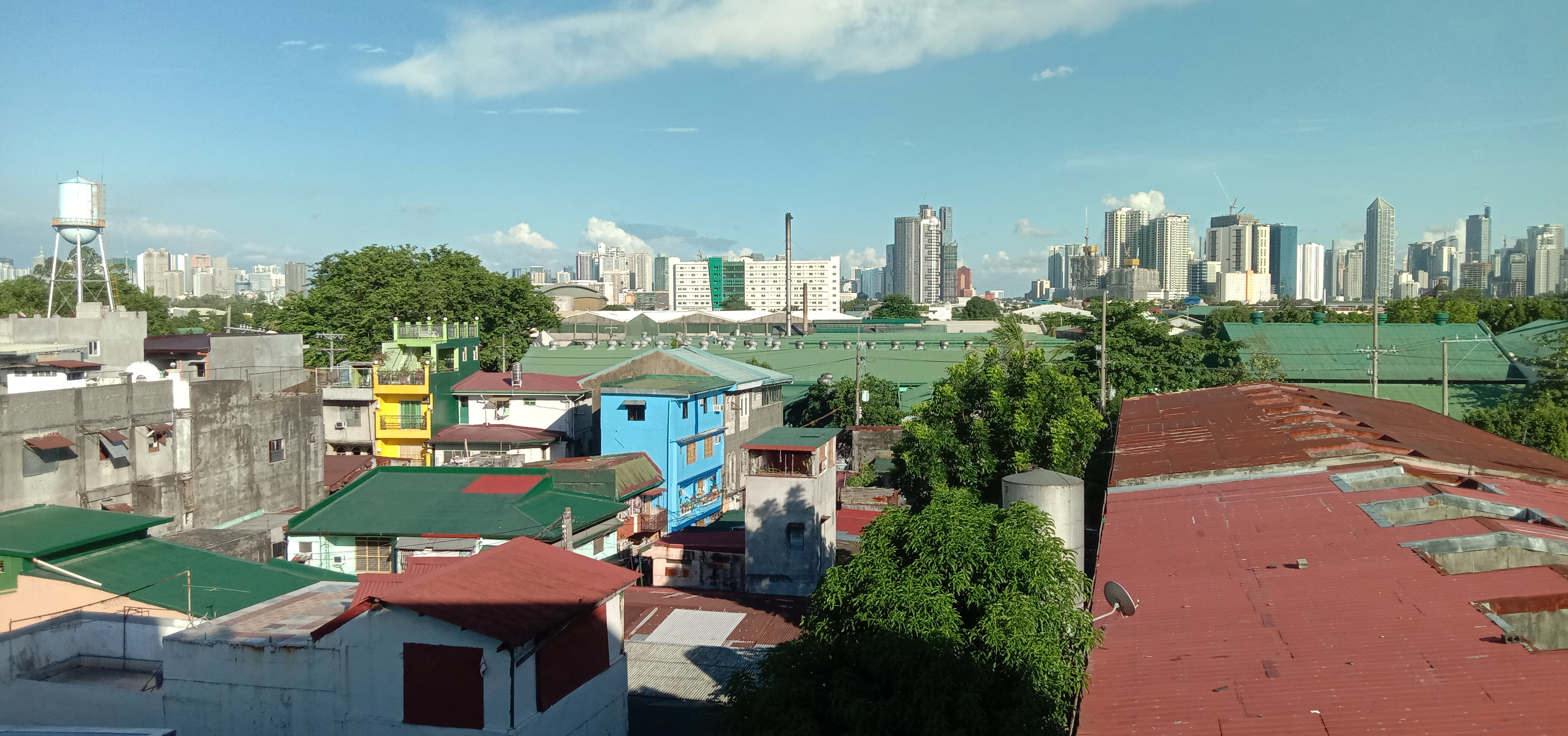
- View of Santa Ana, Manila. Santa Ana Hospital can be seen off-center.

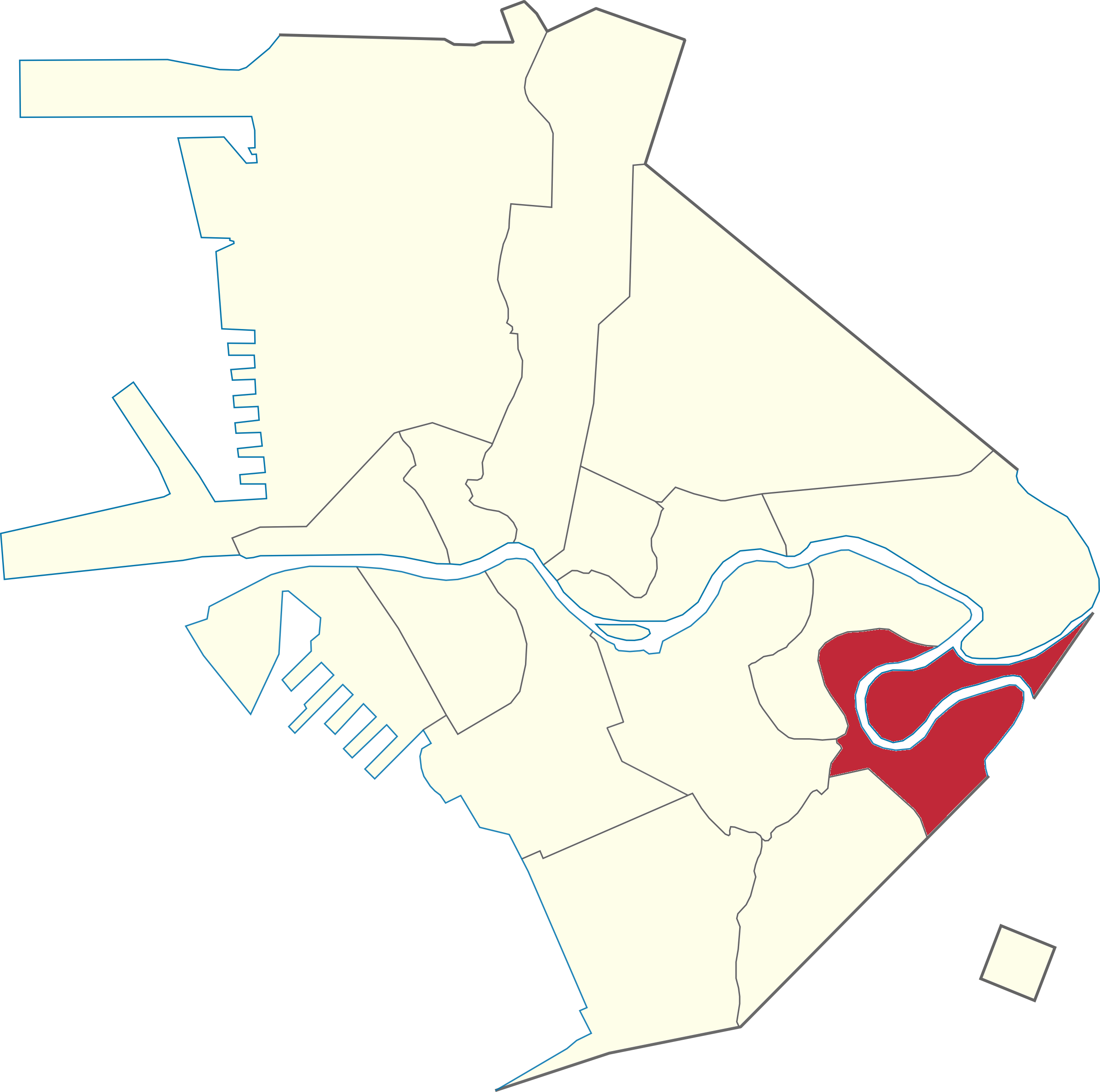
- Country: Philippines
- Region: National Capital Region
- City: Manila

Population (2020)
  - Total: 203,598
- Zip codes: 1009
- Area codes: 2

Santa Ana is a district in the City of Manila, Philippines. It is located on the city's southeast, bordering the cities of Mandaluyong and Makati in the east, the city districts of Paco and Pandacan in the west, and Santa Mesa in the north. It is part of the 6th congressional district of Manila, with thirty-five barangays. Based on the 2020 national census, the Philippine Statistics Authority reported that the district had a population of 203,598.

== Etymology ==
When the Catholic missionaries asked the natives the name of the area, they pointed to the banks of the Pasig River. The locals responded with "sapa" or the Tagalog word for marshes, thinking they were referring to the terrain instead of the place name.

The Franciscan missionaries henceforth dedicated the district to Saint Anne, the mother of the Blessed Virgin Mary, and called it Santa Ana de Sapa ("Saint Anne of the Marshes"). The first part, Santa Ana, is Spanish for such saint.

== History ==
Santa Ana de Sapa
- 1575–1901
- Status: Former municipality of Manila (1575-1901)
- History
  - Established: 1575
  - Disestablished: 1901
Preceded by
Namayan
Succeeded by
1618; Sampaloc
1623; San Juan del Monte
1680; San Pedro Macati
1841; San Felipe Neri
1901; Manila

The original name of Santa Ana before the arrival of the Spanish conquistadors was Sapa, a territory ruled by the polity of Namayan, a small settlement whose last recorded rulers were Lakantagkan, and his wife Buwan ("moon"). The kingdom’s domain stretched from what is now Mandaluyong, Makati, Pasay, and the Manila districts of Pandacan and Paco.

The Spaniards established settlements under the jurisdiction of Santa Ana, with the area awarded to the Franciscan missionaries. They were the first to establish a mission beyond the walls of Intramuros, the Spanish colonial seat of power in Manila, in 1578. The church as it stands today was first built in 1720 and is known as the National Shrine of Our Lady of the Abandoned (Nuestra Señora de los Desamparados).

Edmund Roberts visited Santa Ana in 1832, writing about it in his travelogue, Embassy to the Eastern Courts of Cochin-China, Siam, and Muscat.

== Barangays ==
Santa Ana is divided into 35 barangays.

Zone	Barangay
Zone 95	Barangay 866
Zone 96	Barangays 873, 874, 875, 876, 877, 878, 879, and 880
Zone 97	Barangays 881, 882, 883, 884, 885, and 886
Zone 98	Barangays 887, 888, 889, 890, and 891
Zone 99	Barangays 892, 893, 894, 895, 896, and 897
Zone 100	Barangays 898, 899, 900, 901, 902, 903, 904, and 905

Barangay	Land area (km²)	Population (2020 census)
Zone 95
Barangay 866	0.01576 km²	3,835
Zone 96
Barangay 873	0.04078 km²	1,248
Barangay 874	0.04875 km²	2,016
Barangay 875	0.03084 km²	1,022
Barangay 876	0.03571 km²	574
Barangay 877	0.02952 km²	1,813
Barangay 878	0.02234 km²	960
Barangay 879	0.04265 km²	538
Barangay 880	0.06063 km²	3,417
Zone 97
Barangay 881	0.04342 km²	2,325
Barangay 882	0.02236 km²	1,298
Barangay 883	0.04969 km²	2,199
Barangay 884	0.08407 km²	2,216
Barangay 885	0.03186 km²	623
Barangay 886	0.02229 km²	384
Zone 98
Barangay 887	0.03603 km²	665
Barangay 888	0.06486 km²	837
Barangay 889	0.06137 km²	864
Barangay 890	0.08729 km²	1,049
Barangay 891	0.03948 km²	760
Zone 99
Barangay 892	0.02831 km²	1,144
Barangay 893	0.05407 km²	662
Barangay 894	0.03810 km²	1,885
Barangay 895	0.02078 km²	556
Barangay 896	0.1293 km²	1,265
Barangay 897	0.06728 km²	2,166
Zone 100
Barangay 898	0.05976 km²	7,596
Barangay 899	0.01649 km²	1,562
Barangay 900	0.06506 km²	8,851
Barangay 901	0.007530 km²	1,610
Barangay 902	0.01187 km²	1,328
Barangay 903	0.02617 km²	3,691
Barangay 904	0.01326 km²	1,797
Barangay 905	0.1631 km²	7,385

== Attractions ==
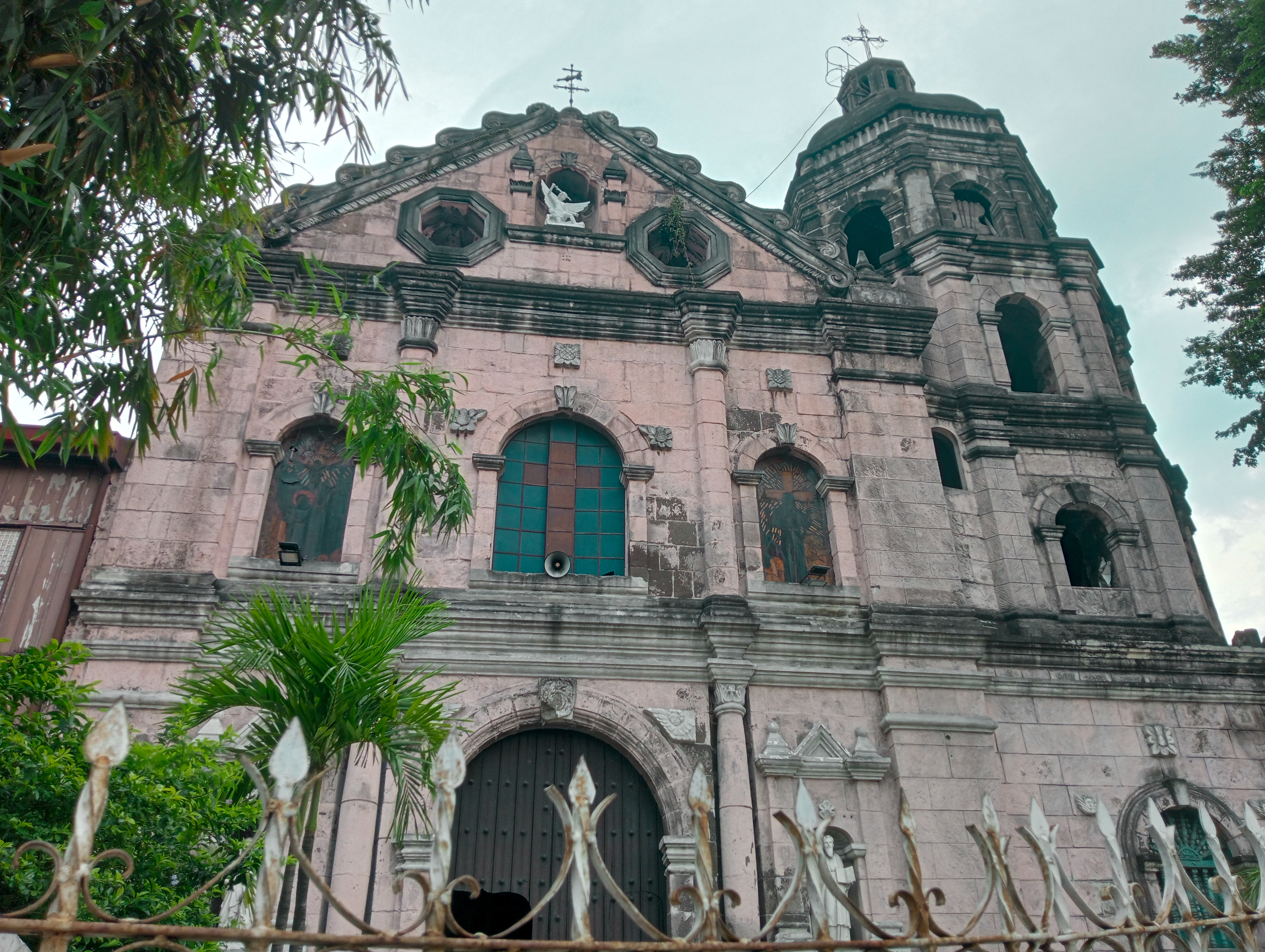
Santa Ana Church

The Parish of Our Lady of the Abandoned of Sta.Ana (Nuestra Señora de los Desamparados de Sta.Ana)

The Church of Santa Ana stands on the site of the first Franciscan mission established outside Manila in 1578. The church was built under the supervision of Fr. Vicente Ingles, OFM. The cornerstone of the present church was laid on September 12, 1720 by Francisco dela Cuesta, then Archbishop of Manila and Acting Governor General of the Philippines.

in the early 1700s, Father Vicente went to Valencia, Spain. The friar had been very enamored of a famous image of Our Lady that had become a big spiritual attraction in Valencia. The image is now known as “Our Lady of the Abandoned” (in Spanish, Nuestra Señora de los Desamparados).While Father Vicente was in Valencia, in the year 1713 he decided to have a copy made of this image—venerated in Valencia with so much devotion—for Santa Ana Parish, which was in the process of being constructed near Manila. After reverently touching the copy to the original image, the friar brought the new replica image with him to the Philippines in 1717. The image has been venerated in Santa Ana for almost 300 years. In time, the parish became known as Our Lady of the Abandoned Parish, as it is today. But St. Ann, the original patron of the parish, has not been forgotten. Today, a statue of St. Ann with the child Mary at her side still stands in a niche directly above the exquisite image of Our Lady of the Abandoned that Father Vicente brought from Valencia.

Through community-based heritage tourism, the Lola Grande Foundation and Fundacion Santiago, Sta. Ana Manila was declared as a heritage site. This means that one cannot alter or demolish any structure in the area without securing consent from Gemma Cruz Araneta (former Ms. International), Sylvia Lichauco and the Fundacion Santiago. All three must consent before securing any permits since they have the power to revoke permits. They prohibit any business from setting up in the area. Moreover, it is highly discouraged for anyone to buy a house within the heritage zone since one does not have a right to alter the property.

=== Lichauco Heritage House ===
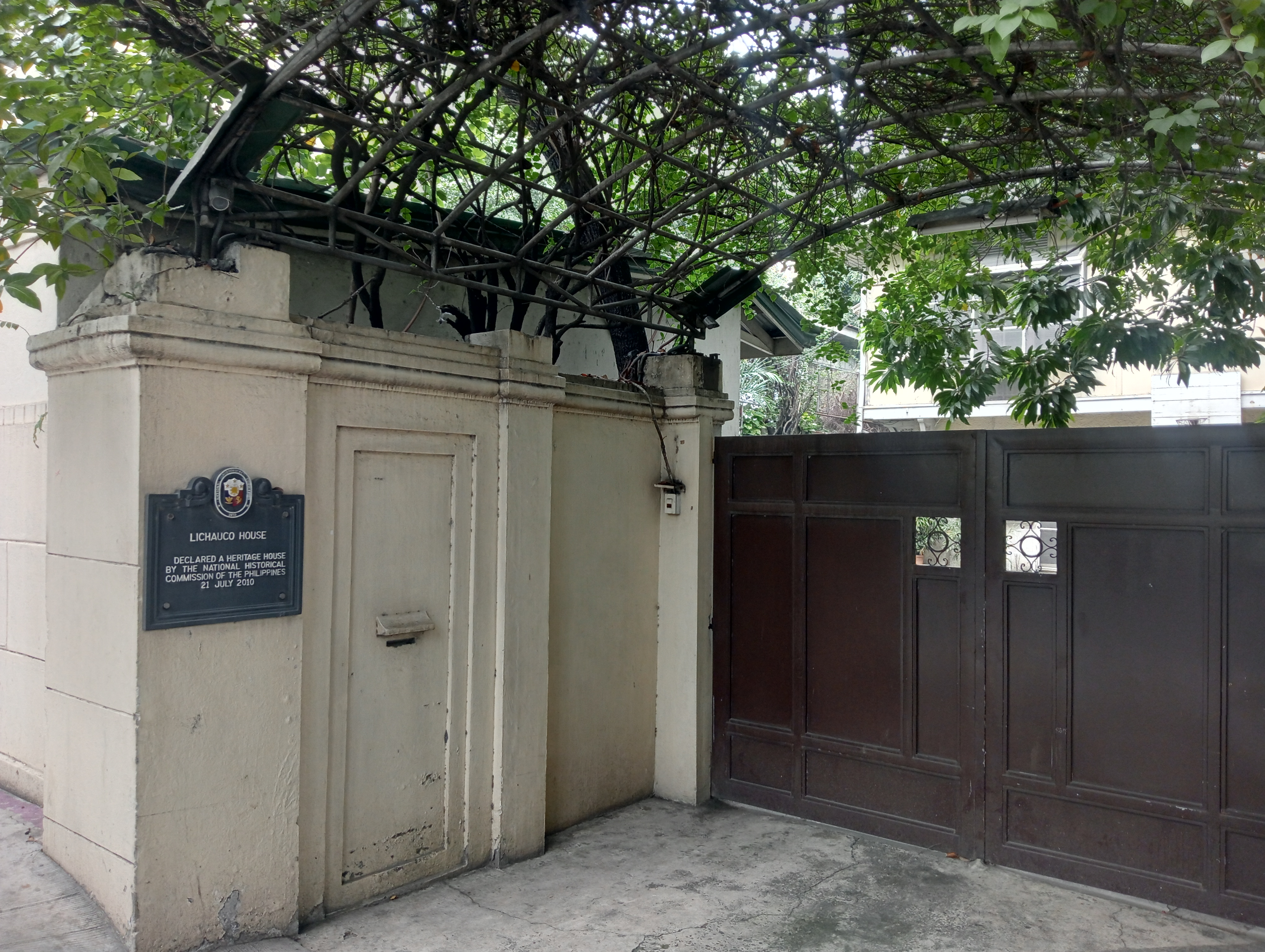
Lichauco House

The Lichauco House was declared a heritage house in 2010. It was built in the 1850s–1860s, damaged in World War II, and rebuilt in 1946.

=== Pascual Modernist House ===
The Pascual House is located in 2138 Dr. M.L. Carreon Street. Like a number of older, prominent houses in the district, this house enjoys the view of the nearby Pasig River which is located on the east, as well as the Estero de Pandacan farther up on the northeast.

The Pascual House is a modernist style house built in April 1948. Currently the house is occupied by its second owner, Rodolfo C. Pascual who bought the property in 1984. Originally the house was owned by Alejandro Velo. According to Pascual, the house was sometimes used as a shooting area for movies during the 1950s.

The breeze coming from the Pasig River, as well as the river being the main route for water travel around Manila, resulted in the siting of the houses of wealthy and prominent families during the Spanish period. These riverside vacation houses had verandas and wide opening to frame the river views as well as catch the breeze.

After the Second World War, the district fell into disarray, becoming a tightly-packed residential district. Eventually the old district for vacation houses was mixed with other architectural styles, which eventually decayed through the years and are now being demolished to give way to modern developments.

The Pascual House was built in the modernist style of architecture. Method of construction is a mixture of reinforced concrete, masonry and wood. Notable feature of the exterior are the 3 reinforced concrete pylons on the façade of the house. The mirador or watchtower is also a notable feature of the exterior that adorns the corner mass of the whole house. Vertical and horizontal design elements complement the whole massing of the house. On the interiors, notable features are the built-in cabinetry, niches and the cove ceilings. All are in stylized geometric form. Granolithic flooring can still be found on the first 3 steps of the stairs and main entrance steps. The whole ground floor is covered in “Machuca” tiles. On the second floor, geometric stylized ventilation panels with the initials of the original owner (AV) embellish the wall partitions. Plumbing fixtures are all original from the 1940s.

== Notable people ==
- Federico Aguilar Alcuaz, painter
- Panday Pira, blacksmith
- Mike Enriquez, broadcast journalist and television presenter
- Lydia Yu-Jose, political science professor
- Pilar Manalo Danao, the first head choir director of the Iglesia ni Cristo
- Maryo J. de los Reyes, tv director
- Carmi Martin, actress, house mansion interior designer
- Zachary David, racing driver
