= 2025 Makati local elections =

11th City elections in Makati

- May 12, 2025
- Mayoral election
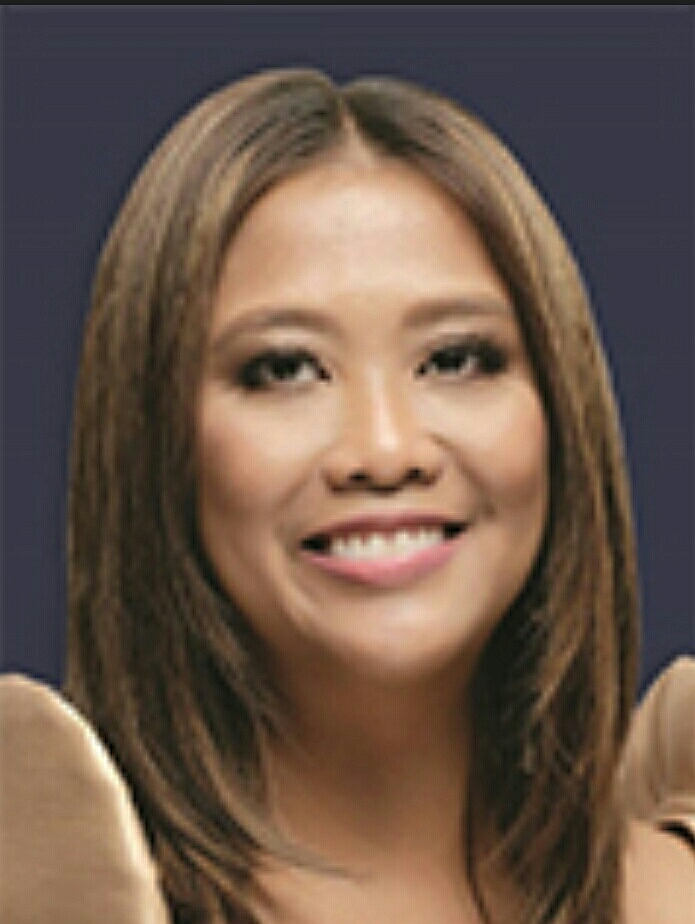

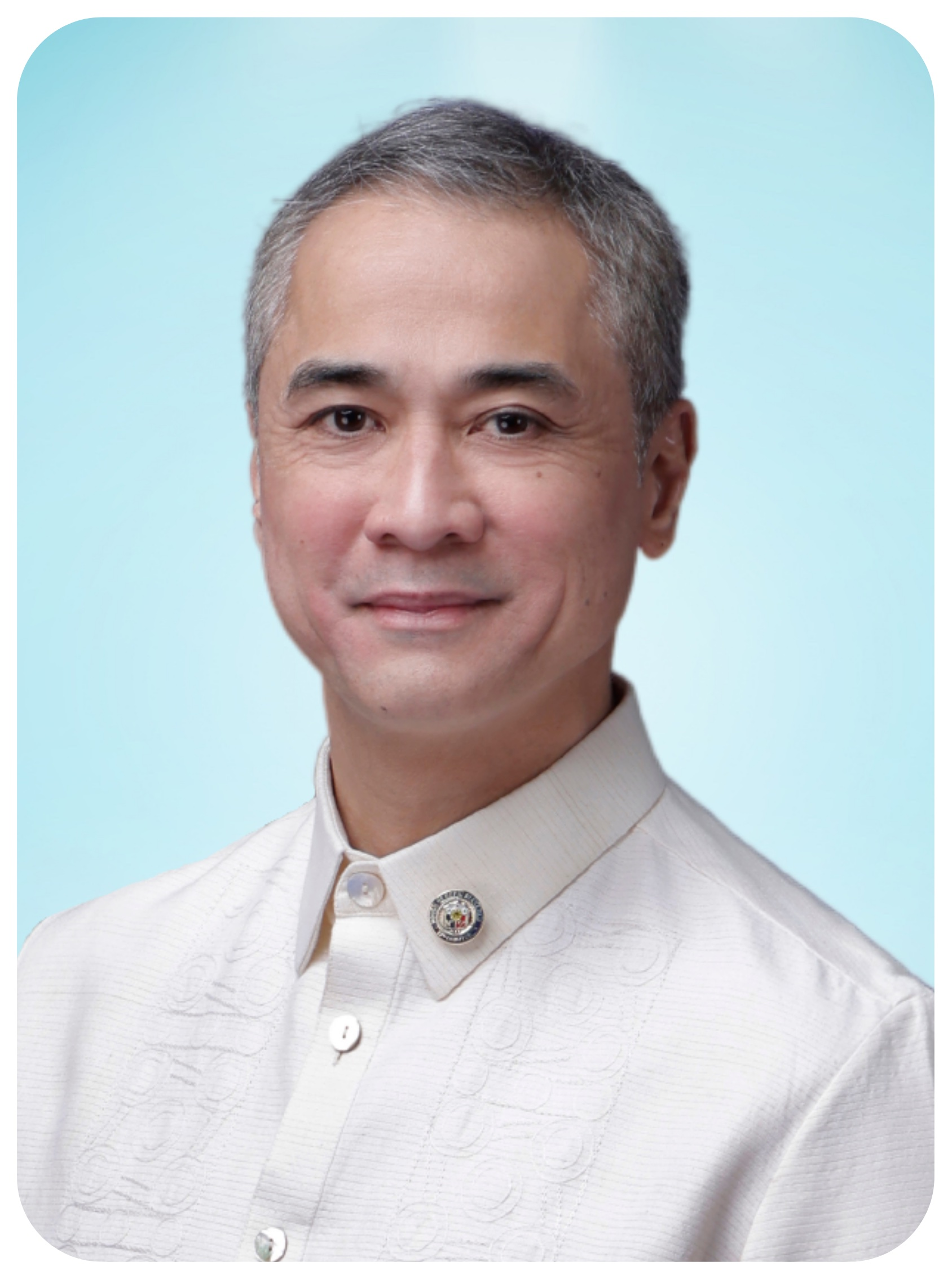

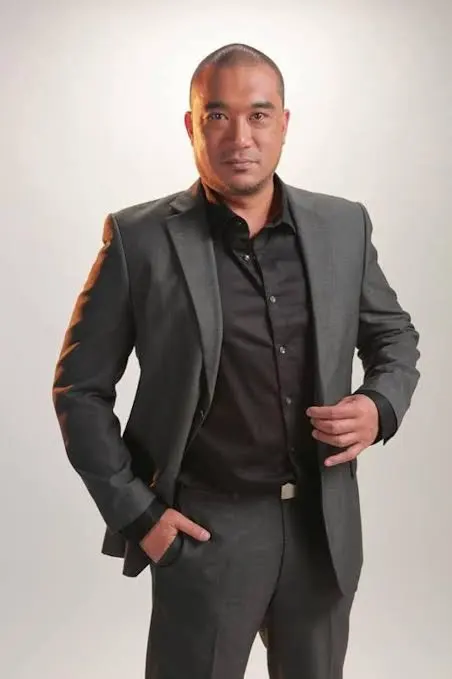

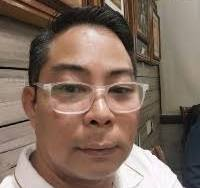
Candidate	Nancy Binay	Luis Campos	Victor Neri
Party	UNA	NPC	Independent
Alliance	Team Nancy	Team United
Running mate	Monsour del Rosario	Kid Peña
Popular vote	114,898	85,664	2,172
Percentage	56.30	41.97	1.06
Candidate	Orlando Stephen Solidum
Party	Independent
Alliance	Kilusan ng Demokratikong Pilipino
Running mate	Monsour del Rosario
Popular vote	1,352
Percentage	0.66
Mayor before election
Abigail Binay
MKTZNU
Elected mayor
Nancy Binay
UNA
- Vice mayoral election
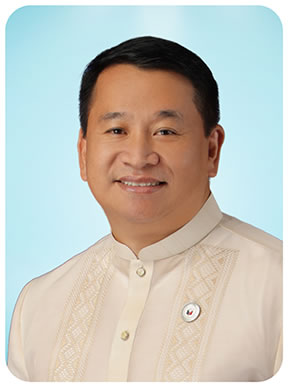

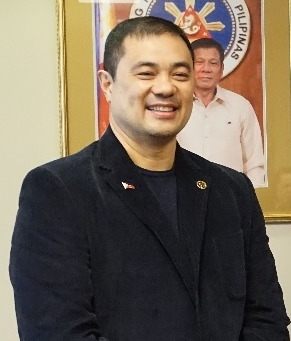
Candidate	Kid Peña	Monsour del Rosario
Party	NPC	UNA
Alliance	Team United	Team Nancy
Popular vote	146,771	54,290
Percentage	73.00	27.00
Vice Mayor before election
Monique Lagdameo
MKTZNU
Elected Vice Mayor
Kid Peña
NPC
- City Council election

16 of 18 seats in the Makati City Council 10 seats needed for a majority
	First party	Second party
Party	MKTZNU	UNA
Last election	15 seats, 93.75%	Did not participate
Seats won	9	7
Seat change	▼6	▲7
Popular vote	709,889	478,882
Percentage	56.20%	37.91%

Local elections were held in Makati on May 12, 2025, as part of the 2025 Philippine general election. The electorate elected a mayor, a vice mayor, and the sixteen councilors, eight per district, that would be members of the Makati City Council, and two district representatives to the House of Representatives of the Philippines.

This was the first elections in which the residents of the Embo barangays did not participate as a result of the Makati–Taguig boundary dispute ruling.

== Background ==
The hotly contested 2019 local elections between Mayor Abigail Binay and her brother, former mayor Junjun Binay, has caused the deterioration of relations between the incumbent mayor's family and the rest of her siblings. Mayor Abigail Binay and her administration easily won reelection in 2022 without opposition from her siblings.

On April 3, 2023, the Supreme Court of the Philippines denied the motion of reconsideration filed by Makati to override its earlier ruling that upheld the 2011 Pasig Regional Trial Court ruling that recognized Taguig's jurisdiction over the ten Embo barangays, resulting in Makati formally ceding control of the barangays to Taguig. The Commission on Elections (COMELEC) began the administrative transfer of the 212,613 Embo voters and electoral precincts from Makati to Taguig in August 2023, ahead of the 2023 Philippine barangay and Sangguniang Kabataan (BSKE) elections, where Embo residents voted as residents of Taguig for the first time.

The transfer of the Embo barangays also put into question the continued existence of Makati's 2nd congressional district, which had three remaining barangays that do not meet the constitutional requirement of at least 250,000 residents per congressional district. However, COMELEC Chairman George Garcia has assured that the three remaining barangays could still elect a representative, pending legislation that will redistrict the affected area between the two cities. In September 2024, the 10 former Makati barangays of the second district were formally redistributed to the two legislative and city council districts of Taguig by the COMELEC, effectively leaving the district with three remaining barangays.

== Tickets ==
Candidates underlined are incumbents seeking reelection.

=== Administration coalition ===
Team United
Position	Name	Party
Mayor	Luis Campos Jr.	NPC
Vice Mayor	Romulo "Kid" Peña Jr.	NPC
1st District House Representative	Monique "Nik" Lagdameo	MKTZNU
2nd District House Representative	Alden Almario	MKTZNU
1st District City Councilor	Rolando "Duka" D. Alvarez Jr.	MKTZNU
1st District City Councilor	Martin John Pio Q. Arenas	MKTZNU
1st District City Councilor	Virgilio "VirJhong" V. Hilario Sr.	MKTZNU
1st District City Councilor	Carmina C. Ortega	MKTZNU
1st District City Councilor	Armando "Idol" P. Padilla	MKTZNU
1st District City Councilor	Rene Andrei "Rebo" Q. Saguisag Jr.	MKTZNU
1st District City Councilor	Jose "Joey" C. Villena IV	MKTZNU
1st District City Councilor	Anna Alcina "Alcine" M. Yabut	MKTZNU
2nd District City Councilor	Heinrich Thaddeus "Hein" M. Angeles	MKTZNU
2nd District City Councilor	Ma. Dolores "Doc Doris" M. Arayon	MKTZNU
2nd District City Councilor	Joel "Bong" M. Ariones	MKTZNU
2nd District City Councilor	Benedict "Bodik" B. Baniqued	MKTZNU
2nd District City Councilor	Marife "Maffy" R. Soler-Calimbahin	MKTZNU
2nd District City Councilor	Edralyn "Ed" M. Marquez	MKTZNU
2nd District City Councilor	Kristina "Ina" T. Sarosa	MKTZNU
2nd District City Councilor	Maribel "Bel" F. Vitales	MKTZNU

=== Opposition coalition ===
Team Nancy - UNA ang Makati
Position	Name	Party
Mayor	Maria Lourdes "Nancy" S. Binay-Angeles	UNA
Vice Mayor	Manuel Monsour T. del Rosario III	UNA
2nd District House Representative	Vincent T. Sese	UNA
1st District City Councilor	Marie Alethea "Mayeth" S. Casal-Uy	UNA
1st District City Councilor	Lennie "Jolly Bee" H. Cosing	UNA
1st District City Councilor	Ferdinand Jacinto "Ferdie Tangol" T. Eusebio	UNA
1st District City Councilor	Fernando Felix "Atty. Dino" L. Imperial	UNA
1st District City Councilor	Romeo "Romy" C. Medina	UNA
1st District City Councilor	Ma. Arlene M. Ortega	UNA
2nd District City Councilor	Jeffrey "Jeff" E. Baluyut	UNA
2nd District City Councilor	Mario U. Hechanova	UNA
2nd District City Councilor	Levy "Teacher Levy" E. Ramboyong	UNA
2nd District City Councilor	Bernadette "Badet" T. Sese	UNA
2nd District City Councilor	Mary Ruth C. Tolentino	UNA
2nd District City Councilor	Nemesio "King" S. Yabut Jr.	UNA

=== Other candidates ===
Team Kilusan ng Demokratikong Pilipino
Position	Name	Party
Mayor	Orlando Stephen A. Solidum	Independent
Vice Mayor	Manuel Monsour T. del Rosario III*	UNA
1st District House Representative	Angelo E. Base	Independent
2nd District House Representative	Vincent T. Sese*	UNA
1st District City Councilor	Marie Alethea "Mayeth" S. Casal-Uy*	UNA
1st District City Councilor	Lennie "Jolly Bee" H. Cosing*	UNA
1st District City Councilor	Ferdinand Jacinto "Ferdie Tangol" T. Eusebio*	UNA
1st District City Councilor	Fernando Felix "Atty. Dino" L. Imperial*	UNA
1st District City Councilor	Martin John Pio Q. Arenas*	MKTZNU
1st District City Councilor	Jose "Joey" C. Villena IV*	MKTZNU
1st District City Councilor	Jessielin "Jessy" O. Trinidad	Independent
1st District City Councilor	Manuel "Manny" V. Dizon	Independent
2nd District City Councilor	Jeffrey "Jeff" E. Baluyut*	UNA
2nd District City Councilor	Mario U. Hechanova*	UNA
2nd District City Councilor	Mary Ruth C. Tolentino*	UNA
2nd District City Councilor	Nemesio "King" S. Yabut Jr.*	UNA
2nd District City Councilor	Kristina "Ina" T. Sarosa*	MKTZNU
2nd District City Councilor	Heinrich Thaddeus "Hein" M. Angeles*	MKTZNU
2nd District City Councilor	Joel "Bong" M. Ariones*	MKTZNU
2nd District City Councilor	Reynante P. Saludo	Independent

- Guest Candidate

=== Independent Candidates ===
Independent
Name	Party
For House of Representative (1st District)
Minnie A. Antonio	Independent
For Councilor (1st District)
Victorino "Vic Bisaya" C. Calinawan	Independent
Dan Jason P. Cuaresma	Independent
John Christian "JCL" C. Lingad	Independent
Herman Marco "Tito Kanin" N. Garcia	Independent
Virgilio "Battle" R. Batalla (withdrew)	Independent

=== Other Non-Independent Candidates ===
Partido Demokratiko Pilipino
For Mayor
Victor Neri	PDP

== Mayoral election ==
The incumbent mayor is Abigail Binay, who was reelected for her third term in 2022, and is ineligible for reelection. Binay has indicated her preference for her husband, Representative Luis Campos to succeed her.

The incumbent's sister, Senator Nancy Binay, first indicated a run for the city's mayoralty on January 20, 2024, where she shared with DWIZ-AM that she was "50 percent sure" that she would seek the office upon the end of her term as senator. She would confirm her bid for the mayor on September 9.

=== Candidates ===
- Nancy Binay (United Nationalist Alliance) – incumbent senator
- Luis Campos (Nationalist People's Coalition) – representative of Makati's second district
- Victor Neri (Independent), actor
- Orlando Stephen Solidum (Independent)

==== Declined ====
- Antonio Lagdameo Jr. (PFP) – incumbent special assistant to the president of the Philippines

=== Results ===
2025 Makati mayoral election
Candidate	Party	Votes	%
Nancy Binay	United Nationalist Alliance	114,898	56.30
Luis Campos Jr.	Nationalist People's Coalition	85,664	41.97
Victor Neri	Independent	2,172	1.06
Orlando Stephen Solidum	Independent	1,352	0.66
Total		204,086	100.00
United Nationalist Alliance gain from Makatizens United Party			

== Vice mayoral election ==
The incumbent vice mayor is Monique Lagdameo, who was reelected for her third term in 2022, and is ineligible for reelection.

=== Candidates ===
- Monsour del Rosario (United Nationalist Alliance) – former representative of Makati's first district and member of the Makati City Council from the first district
- Kid Peña (Nationalist People's Coalition) – incumbent representative of Makati's first district, former acting mayor of Makati, and former vice mayor of Makati

=== Results ===
2025 Makati vice mayoral election
Candidate	Party	Votes	%
Kid Peña	Nationalist People's Coalition	146,771	73.00
Monsour del Rosario	United Nationalist Alliance	54,290	27.00
Total		201,061	100.00
Nationalist People's Coalition gain from Makatizens United Party			

== House of Representatives election ==
=== First District ===
The district consists of barangays in western Makati, namely Bangkal, Bel-Air, Carmona, Dasmariñas, Forbes Park, Kasilawan, La Paz, Magallanes, Olympia, Palanan, Pio del Pilar, Poblacion, San Antonio, San Isidro, San Lorenzo, Santa Cruz, Singkamas, Tejeros, Urdaneta, and Valenzuela.

The incumbent is Kid Peña, who was re-elected for his second term in 2022 with 94.87% of the vote.

==== Candidates ====
- Minnie Antonio (Independent)
- Angelo Base (Independent) – marriage and family therapist
- Monique Lagdameo (Makatizens United Party) – incumbent vice mayor of Makati, former representative of Makati's first district (2010–2016) and former member of the Makati City Council from the first district

==== Results ====
2025 Philippine House of Representatives election in the 1st District of Makati
Candidate	Party	Votes	%
Monique Lagdameo	Makatizens United Party	130,355	89.82
Angelo Base	Independent	8,324	5.74
Minnie Antonio	Independent	6,458	4.45
Total		145,137	100.00
Valid votes		145,137	67.15
Invalid/blank votes		71,015	32.85
Total votes		216,152	100.00
Makatizens United Party gain from Nationalist People's Coalition			

=== Second District ===
The district, as it stands, consists of three barangays: Guadalupe Nuevo, Guadalupe Viejo, and Pinagkaisahan.

The incumbent is Luis Campos, who was re-elected for his third term in 2022 with 91.75% of the vote and is therefore ineligible for re-election.

==== Candidates ====
- Alden Almario (Makatizens United Party) – incumbent member of the Makati City Council from the second district
- Vincent Sese (United Nationalist Alliance) – former member of the Makati City Council from the second district

==== Results ====
2025 Philippine House of Representatives election in the 2nd District of Makati
Candidate	Party	Votes	%
Alden Almario	Makatizens United Party	19,834	55.19
Vincent Sese	United Nationalist Alliance	16,101	44.81
Total		35,935	100.00
Valid votes		35,935	66.44
Invalid/blank votes		18,153	33.56
Total votes		54,088	100.00
Makatizens United Party gain from Nationalist People's Coalition			

== City council election ==
Each of Makati's two city council districts elects eight councilors to the City Council. The eight candidates with the highest number of votes wins the seats per district.

Party	Votes	%	Seats
Makatizens United Party	709,889	56.20	9
United Nationalist Alliance	478,882	37.91	7
Independent	74,287	5.88	0
Ex officio seats			2
Total	1,263,058	100.00	18

=== First district ===
The last election saw the administration slate sweep the district, getting all eight seats.

==== Term-limited incumbents ====
- Jhong Hilario (Makatizens United Party)
  - Hilario will focus on his entertainment career. He endorsed his father, former councilor Virgilio Sr., who is running to replace him.
- Luis S. Javier Jr. (Makatizens United Party)

2025 Makati City Council election - District 1
Candidate	Party	Votes	%
Virgilio "VirJhong" V. Hilario Sr.	Makatizens United Party	96,429	56.43
Anna Alcina "Alcine" M. Yabut (incumbent)	Makatizens United Party	85,688	50.14
Martin John Pio Q. Arenas (incumbent)	Makatizens United Party	73,694	43.13
Marie Althea "Mayeth" S. Casal-Uy	United Nationalist Alliance	71,820	42.03
Ma. Arlene M. Ortega	United Nationalist Alliance	68,815	40.27
Ferdinand Jacinto "Ferdie Tangol" T. Eusebio	United Nationalist Alliance	66,729	39.05
Armando "Idol" P. Padilla (incumbent)	Makatizens United Party	64,531	37.76
Fernando Felix "Atty. Dino" L. Imperial	United Nationalist Alliance	64,326	37.64
Rene Andrei "Rebo" Q. Saguisag Jr. (incumbent)	Makatizens United Party	64,298	37.63
Rolando "Duka" D. Alvarez Jr.	Makatizens United Party	63,677	37.26
Jose "Joey" C. Villena IV (incumbent)	Makatizens United Party	62,742	36.72
Carmina C. Ortega (incumbent)	Makatizens United Party	60,029	35.13
Romeo "Romy" C. Medina	United Nationalist Alliance	59,505	34.82
Lennie "Jolly Bee" H. Cosing	United Nationalist Alliance	51,146	29.93
Jessielin "Jessy" O. Trinidad	Independent	20,961	12.27
Manuel "Manny" V. Dizon	Independent	14,317	8.38
Victorino "Vic Bisaya" C. Calinawan	Independent	9,892	5.79
Dan Jason P. Cuaresma	Independent	9,503	5.56
John Christian "JCL" C. Lingad	Independent	8,930	5.23
Herman Marco "Tito Kanin" N. Garcia	Independent	8,132	4.76
Virgilio "Battle" R. Batalla (withdrew)	Independent	0	0.00
Total		1,025,164	100.00

=== Second district ===
The last election saw the administration slate get a supermajority the district by winning seven of the eight available seats. It was also the last election that featured candidates from the Embo barangays.

==== Term-limited incumbents ====
- Shirley Aspillaga (Reform PH)

==== Not running for reelection ====
- Arnold Cruz (resigned upon election as Barangay Captain of Rizal, Taguig, and later ran for Taguig 1st district councilor)

2025 Makati City Council election - District 2
Candidate	Party	Votes	%
Kristina "Ina" T. Sarosa (incumbent)	Makatizens United Party	21,787	55.62
Ma. Dolores "Doc Doris" M. Arayon (incumbent)	Makatizens United Party	19,632	50.12
Heinrich Thaddeus "Hein" M. Angeles	Makatizens United Party	18,367	46.89
Bernadette "Badet" T. Sese	United Nationalist Alliance	18,295	46.71
Joel "Bong" M. Ariones (incumbent)	Makatizens United Party	17,386	44.39
Levy "Teacher Levy" E. Ramboyong	United Nationalist Alliance	17,123	43.71
Nemesio "King" S. Yabut Jr.	United Nationalist Alliance	16,619	42.43
Maribel "Bel" F. Vitales	Makatizens United Party	15,874	40.53
Benedict "Bodik" B. Baniqued (incumbent)	Makatizens United Party	15,630	39.90
Mary Ruth C. Tolentino	United Nationalist Alliance	15,599	39.82
Jeffrey "Jeff" E. Baluyut	United Nationalist Alliance	15,579	39.77
Edralyn "Ed" M. Marquez (incumbent)	Makatizens United Party	15,459	39.47
Marife "Maffy" R. Soler Calimbahin	Makatizens United Party	14,666	37.44
Mario U. Hechanova	United Nationalist Alliance	13,326	34.02
Reynante P. Saludo	Independent	2,552	6.52
Total		237,894	100.00
