= Alden Almario =

Filipino politician (born 1971)

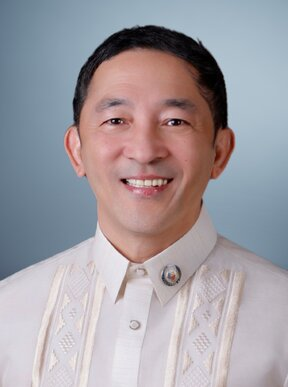
- Official portrait, 2025

Member of Philippine House of Representatives for Makati's 2nd district
- Incumbent
- Assumed office June 30, 2025
- Preceded by: Luis Campos

Member of the Makati City Council
- In office June 30, 2019 – June 30, 2025

Personal details
- Born: Dennis Borja Almario; April 27, 1971 (age 55) Manila, Philippines
- Party: MKTZNU (2022–present)
- Other political affiliations: UNA (2019–2022)
- Spouse: Rosette Nogoy
- Nickname: Alden

Dennis "Alden" Borja Almario (born April 27, 1971) is a Filipino politician who has served as the representative for Makati's 2nd congressional district in the Philippine House of Representatives since 2025. Currently a member of the Makatizens United Party, he previously served as a member of the Makati City Council from 2019 to 2025.

== Political career ==
=== Makati City Council (2019–2025) ===
Almario successfully ran for the Makati City Council as a member of the United Nationalist Alliance under the Team Performance alliance, led by Makati mayor Abigail Binay, in 2019, placing fifth among the eight winning candidates in the city's 2nd district. He was re-elected in 2022 under the newly formed Makatizens United Party, also led by Binay, placing second.

=== House of Representatives (2025–present) ===
==== 2025 election ====
Luis Campos, Binay's husband and the incumbent representative of Makati's 2nd congressional district, was term-limited and ran for mayor of Makati. Campos endorsed Almario for the district's House seat, and he defeated former councilor Vincent Sese by nearly 4,000 votes.

==== Tenure ====
During the 20th Congress, Almario principally authored House Bill No. 6882, which seeks to protect individuals' digital likenesses by preventing the unethical use of AI-generated content. He is also one of the representatives who co-authored the Anti-Political Dynasty Act, which was approved by the House on third reading in June 2026.

Almario, together with Makati's 1st district representative Monique Lagdameo, voted in favor of the second impeachment of Vice President Sara Duterte on May 11, 2026.

==== Committee membership ====
- Committee on Accounts
- Committee on Appropriations
- Committee on Dangerous Drugs
- Committee on Metro Manila Development

== Electoral history ==
Electoral history of Alden Almario
Year	Office	Party	Votes received				Result
Year	Office	Party	Total	%	P.	Swing	Result
2019	Councilor (Makati–2nd)	UNA	78,093	6.68%	5th	—N/a	Won
2022	Councilor (Makati–2nd)	MKTZNU	121,831	9.63%	2nd	+0.42	Won
2025	Representative (Makati–2nd)	MKTZNU	19,834	55.19%	1st	—N/a	Won

House of Representatives of the Philippines
Preceded by Luis Campos	Member for Makati's 2nd district June 30, 2025 – present	Incumbent
