= 2022 Makati local elections =

10th City elections in Makati

2022 Makati mayoral election
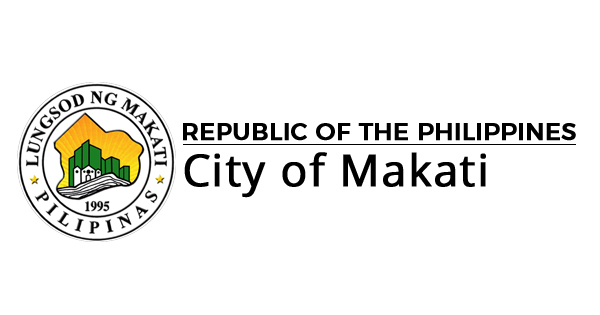
- May 9, 2022
- Mayoral election
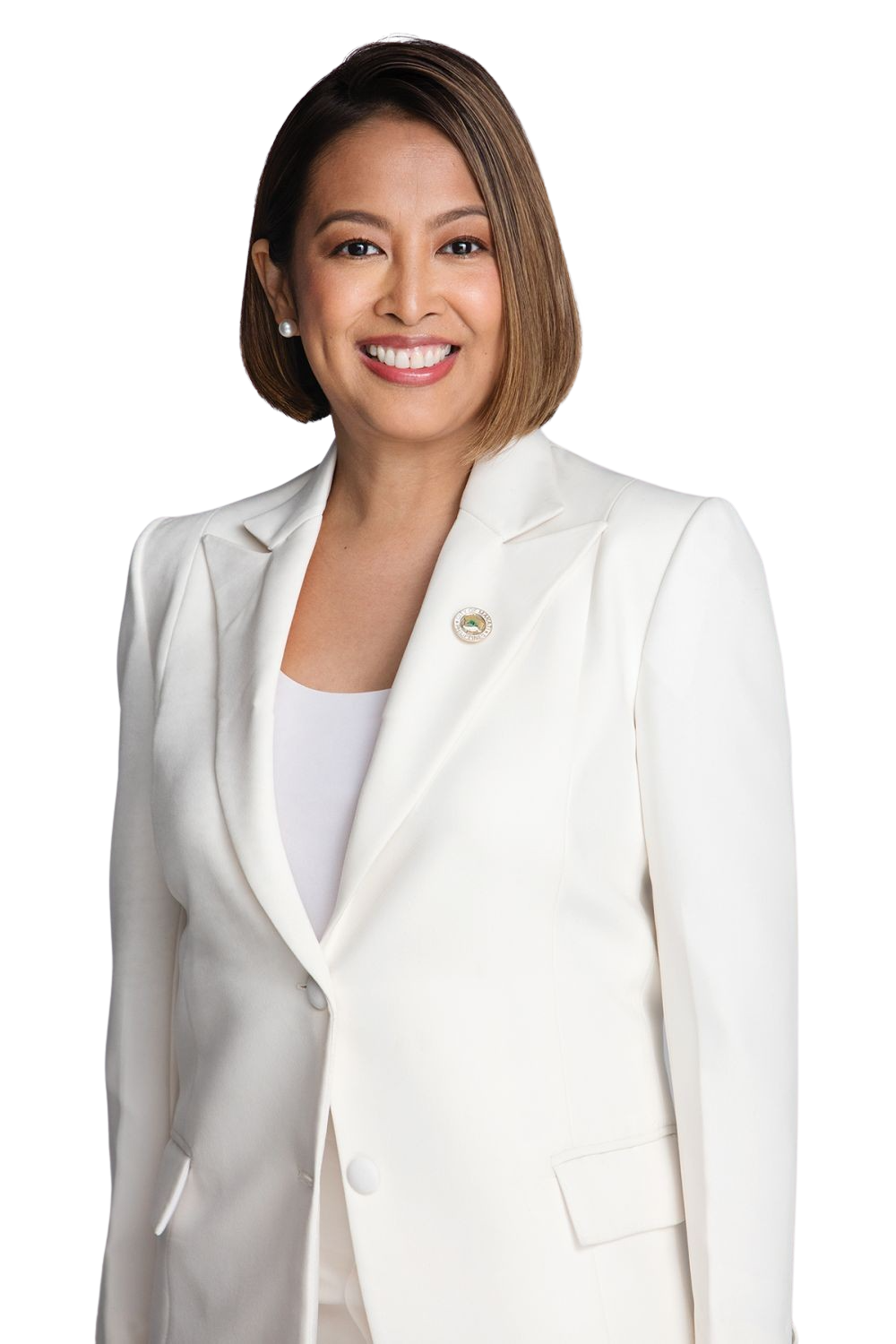
		Ind
Candidate	Abigail Binay	Joel Hernandez
Party	MKTZNU	Independent
Alliance	Team United
Running mate	Monique Lagdameo
Popular vote	338,819	16,640
Percentage	95.32	4.68
- Vice mayoral election
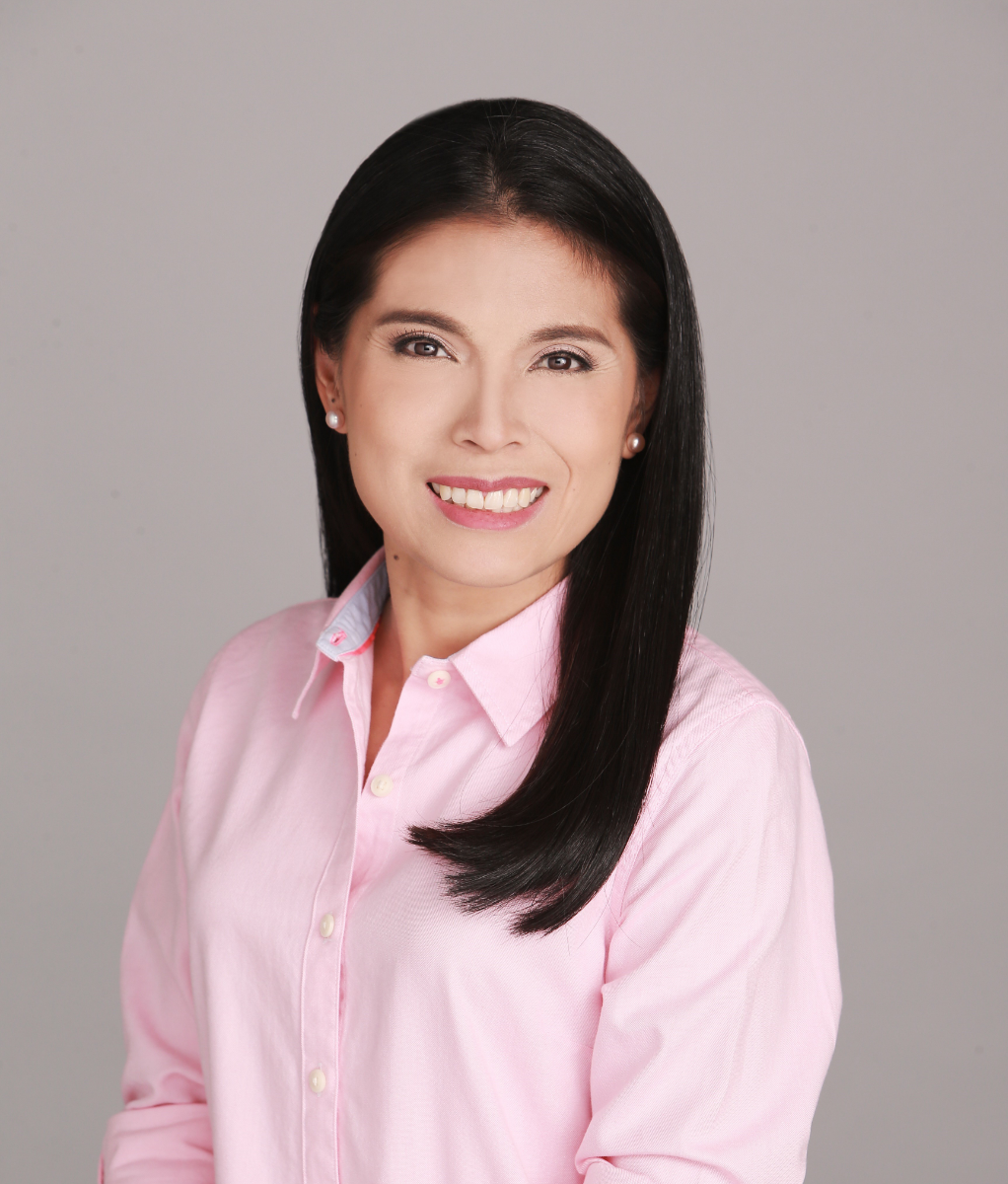

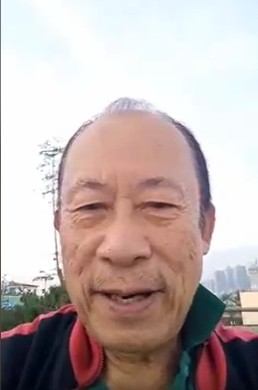
Candidate	Monique Lagdameo	Rodolfo Biolena
Party	MKTZNU	Independent
Alliance	Team United	Team Reform
Popular vote	314,070	22,498
Percentage	93.32	6.68
Mayor before election
Abigail Binay
UNA
Elected mayor
Abigail Binay
MKTZNU

Local elections took place in Makati on Monday, May 9, 2022, as a part of the 2022 Philippine general election. Voters will elect candidates for Mayor, Vice Mayor, two representatives, and the sixteen councilors, eight per district, that would be members of the city council. This was the last general (nationwide and local) elections in the Embo barangays as part of Makati before being turned over to Taguig in 2023 as a result of the Makati–Taguig boundary dispute ruling.

== Background ==
Incumbent Mayor Abigail Binay would seek for her third and final term. Her opponent was independent Joel Hernandez. Former 2nd district councilor Nemesio "King" Yabut Jr., son of the late former mayor Nemesio Yabut Sr., also filed his candidacy for mayor, but was later disqualified by COMELEC.

Incumbent Vice Mayor Monique Lagdameo would seek for her third and final term. Her opponent was Rodolfo Biolena, an independent candidate who has been running in various Makati local positions since 1998.

Incumbent First District Congressman Kid Peña would seek for his second term. His opponents were Minnie Antonio and Ferdinand Sevilla, both independent candidates.

Incumbent Second District Congressman Luis Campos would seek for his third and final term. His opponent was Ricardo Opoc, an independent candidate.

== Tickets ==
=== Administration coalition ===
Makatizens United Party/Team United
Name	Party
For Mayor
1. Mar-Len Abigail "Abby" S. Binay-Campos	MKTZNU
For Vice Mayor
2. Monique "Nik" Lagdameo	MKTZNU
1st District
For House Of Representatives
2. Romulo "Kid" Peña Jr.	Liberal
For Councilor
1. Martin John Pio Q. Arenas	MKTZNU
6. Virgilio "Jhong" Hilario Jr.	MKTZNU
7. Luis "Jojo" S. Javier Jr.	MKTZNU
12. Carmina C. Ortega	MKTZNU
13. Armando "Idol" P. Padilla	MKTZNU
15. Rene Andrei "Rebo" Q. Saguisag Jr.	MKTZNU
17. Jose "Joey" C. Villena IV	MKTZNU
18. Anna Alcina "Alcine" Yabut	MKTZNU
2nd District
For House Of Representatives
1. Luis Campos Jr.	NPC
For Councilor (2nd District)
2. Alden Almario	MKTZNU
3. Maria Dolores "Doc Doris" M. Arayon	MKTZNU
4. Joel "Bong" M. Ariones	MKTZNU
6. Benedict "Bodik" B. Baniqued	MKTZNU
8. Vann Ryan "Ryan Soler" S. Calimbahin	MKTZNU
9. Arnold "Sammy" J. Cruz	MKTZNU
14. Edralyn "Ed" M. Marquez	MKTZNU
16. Kristina "Ina" T. Sarosa	MKTZNU

=== Primary opposition coalition ===
Reform PH Party/Team Reform
#	Name	Party
For Vice Mayor
1.	Rodolfo "Kuya Rod" D. Biolena	Independent
For Councilor (1st District)
2.	Virgilio "Battle" R. Batalla	Independent
4.	Ernesto "Yoyoy" T. Cruz	Reform
5.	Ferdinand Jacinto "Ferdie Tangol" T. Eusebio	Reform
9.	Romeo "Romy" C. Medina	Reform
11.	Ma. Arlene M. Ortega	Reform
14.	Tosca Camille T. Puno-Ramos	Reform
16.	Joselito "Jojo" M. Salvador	Reform
For Councilor (2nd District)
1.	Benedicto "Benny" M. Abatay	PPM
5.	Shirley "Aspi" C. Aspillaga	Reform
7.	Leo "Tatak De Lara" E. Bes	Reform
10.	Israel "Boyet" S. Cruzado	Reform
12.	Rogelio "Kuya Roger" G. Jurisprudencia	Independent
13.	Leonardo "Leo" M. Magpantay	Reform
15.	Jeline "Baby" M. Olfato	Reform
17.	Mary Ruth C. Tolentino	Reform

=== Independent Candidates ===
Independent
Name	Party
For Mayor
Joel C. Hernandez	Independent
For House of Representative (1st District)
Minnie A. Antonio	Independent
Ferdinand T. Sevilla	Independent
For Councilor (1st District)
Rafael S. Ojeda Jr.	Independent
Mariano P. Lubo	Independent
Victorino "Vic Bisaya" C. Calinawan	Independent
For House of Representative (2nd District)
Ricardo L. Opoc	Independent
For Councilor (2nd District)
Teofredo T. Gamotin	Independent

== Opinion polling ==
=== For Mayor ===
Source of poll aggregation	Dates administered	Abby Binay	Joel Hernandez	Margin
PUBLiCUS Asia Inc.	February 18–24, 2022	68%	10%	Binay +58
PUBLiCUS Asia Inc.	March 16–21, 2022	66%	11%	Binay +55
PUBLiCUS Asia Inc.	April 8–13, 2022	70%	14%	Binay +56

=== For Vice Mayor ===
Source of poll aggregation	Dates administered	Rod Biolena	Monique Lagdameo	Margin
PUBLiCUS Asia Inc.	February 18–24, 2022	10%	60%	Lagdameo +50
PUBLiCUS Asia Inc.	March 16–21, 2022	13%	54%	Lagdameo +41
PUBLiCUS Asia Inc.	April 8–13, 2022	18%	55%	Lagdameo +37

== Results ==
=== Mayor ===
Incumbent Mayor Abigail Binay will seek for her third and final term, this time under the newly launched Makatizens United Party (MKTZNU). She was challenged by independent Joel Hernandez. Abigail's younger sister, Marita Angeline "Anne" Binay-Alcantara, filed for the same position but later withdrew. Incumbent mayor Abigail Binay handily won against her opponent.

Makati Mayoralty Election
Party	Candidate	Votes	%
MKTZNU	Abigail Binay (incumbent)	338,819	95.32
Independent	Joel Hernandez	16,640	4.68
Total votes		355,459	100.00
MKTZNU hold			

=== Vice Mayor ===
Incumbent Vice Mayor Monique Lagdameo will seek for her third and final term. She will be challenged by Rodolfo Biolena, an independent candidate. Lagdameo won by a landslide.

Makati Vice Mayoralty Election
Party	Candidate	Votes	%
MKTZNU	Monique Lagdameo (incumbent)	314,070	93.32
Independent	Rodolfo Biolena	22,498	6.68
Total votes		336,568	100.00
MKTZNU hold			

=== District Representatives ===
Party or alliance		Votes	%	Seats
Team United	Nationalist People's Coalition	164,948	49.41	1
Team United	Liberal Party	146,131	43.78	1
Team United	Total	311,079	93.19	2
Independent		22,743	6.81	0
Total		333,822	100.00	2

==== First District ====
Kid Peña is the incumbent. His opponents are independent candidates Minnie Antonio and Ferdinand Sevilla.

2022 Philippine House of Representatives election in the 1st District of Makati
Party	Candidate	Votes	%
Liberal	Kid Peña (incumbent)	146,131	94.87
Independent	Minnie Antonio	4,801	3.12
Independent	Ferdinand Sevilla	3,104	2.02
Total votes		154,036	100.00
Liberal hold			

==== Second District ====
Luis Campos Jr. is the incumbent. His opponent is independent candidate Ricardo Opoc.

2022 Philippine House of Representatives election in the 2nd District of Makati
Party	Candidate	Votes	%
NPC	Luis Campos Jr. (incumbent)	164,948	91.75
Independent	Ricardo Opoc	14,838	8.25
Total votes		179,786	100.00
NPC hold			

=== City Council ===
Party or alliance		Votes	%	Seats
Makatizens United Party		1,607,792	69.98	15
Team Reform	Reform	587,169	25.56	1
Team Reform	Partido Pederal ng Maharlika	20,141	0.88	0
Team Reform	Independent	40,658	1.77	0
Team Reform	Total	647,968	28.20	1
Independent		41,701	1.82	0
Ex officio seats				2
Total		2,297,461	100.00	18

==== First District ====
All eight MKTZNU candidates won in this district.

2022 Makati City Council election at the 1st district of Makati
Party	Candidate	Votes	%
MKTZNU	Virgilio "Jhong" Hilario Jr.	121,111	70.71
MKTZNU	Anna Alcina "Alcine" M. Yabut	107,045	62.50
MKTZNU	Martin John Pio Q. Arenas	92,856	54.21
MKTZNU	Jose "Joey" C. Villena IV	88,531	51.69
MKTZNU	Carmina C. Ortega	85,695	50.03
MKTZNU	Rene Andrei "Rebo" Q. Saguisag Jr.	85,438	49.88
MKTZNU	Luis "Jojo" S. Javier Jr.	84,633	49.41
MKTZNU	Armando "Idol" P. Padilla	82,940	48.42
Reform	Ferdinand Jacinto "Ferdie Tangol" T. Eusebio	55,107	32.17
Reform	Tosca Camille T. Puno-Ramos	48,992	28.60
Reform	Ma. Arlene M. Ortega	46,229	26.99
Reform	Romeo "Romy" C. Medina	39,544	23.09
Independent	Virgilio "Battle" R. Batalla	26,975	15.75
Reform	Joselito "Jojo" M. Salvador	22,352	13.05
Reform	Ernesto "Yoyoy" T. Cruz	15,969	9.32
Independent	Rafael S. Ojeda Jr.	10,213	5.96
Independent	Mariano P. Lubo	10,116	5.91
Independent	Victorino "Vic Bisaya" C. Calinawan	9,150	5.34
Total votes		1,032,896	100.00

==== Second District ====
Seven out of eight MKTZNU candidates won in this district. One Team Reform candidate took the 8th spot.

2022 Makati City Council election at the 2nd district of Makati
Party	Candidate	Votes	%
MKTZNU	Kristina "Ina" T. Sarosa	136,836	67.14
MKTZNU	Alden Almario	121,831	59.77
MKTZNU	Arnold "Sammy" J. Cruz	115,977	56.90
MKTZNU	Maria Dolores "Doc Doris" M. Arayon	107,027	52.51
MKTZNU	Joel "Bong" M. Ariones	105,236	51.63
MKTZNU	Benedict "Bodik" B. Baniqued	103,291	50.68
MKTZNU	Edralyn "Ed" M. Marquez	89,161	43.75
Reform	Shirley "Aspi" C. Aspillaga	80,487	39.49
MKTZNU	Vann Ryan "Ryan Soler" S. Calimbahin	80,184	39.34
Reform	Leonardo "Leo" M. Magpantay	76,586	37.58
Reform	Israel "Boyet" S. Cruzado	73,855	36.24
Reform	Mary Ruth C. Tolentino	54,677	26.83
Reform	Jeline "Baby" M. Olfato	42,341	20.77
Reform	Leo "Tatak de Lara" E. Bes	31,030	15.22
PPM	Benedicto "Benny" M. Abatay	20,141	9.88
Independent	Rogelio "Kuya Roger" G. Jurisprudencia	13,683	6.71
Independent	Teofredo T. Gamotin	12,222	6.00
Total votes		1,264,565	100.00
