= Luis Campos (politician) =

Filipino politician

Luis Campos Jr.
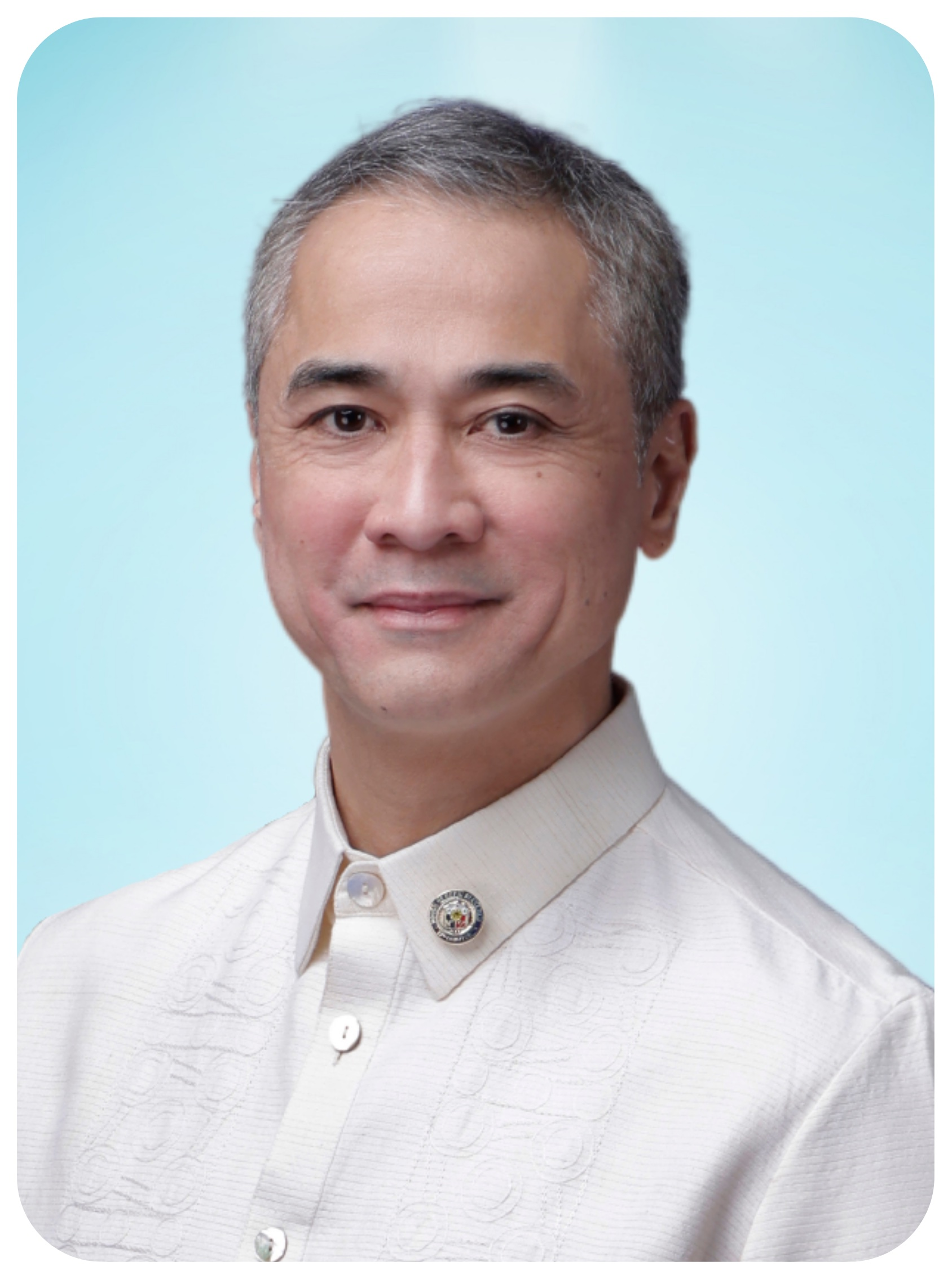
- Official portrait, 2022

Member of the Philippine House of Representatives from Makati's 2nd district
- In office June 30, 2016 – June 30, 2025
- Preceded by: Abby Binay
- Succeeded by: Dennis Almario

Personal details
- Born: Luis Jose Angel Nakpil Campos Jr. October 16, 1967 (age 58) Ermita, Manila, Philippines
- Party: NPC (2018–present); Makatizens United Party (2021–present)
- Other political affiliations: UNA (2015–2018)
- Spouse: Abigail "Abby" Binay (m. 2008)
- Children: 1
- Relatives: Paulo Campos (uncle); Jose C. Campos (uncle)
- Education: De La Salle University (BA, MBA); Ateneo de Manila University (JD)
- Occupation: Politician, businessman
- Profession: Lawyer

Luis Jose Angel Nakpil Campos Jr. (born October 16, 1967) is a Filipino lawyer, politician, and businessman who served in the Philippine House of Representatives representing Makati's 2nd district from 2016 to 2025.

== Early life and education ==
Campos was born on October 16, 1967 in Ermita, Manila. A member of the Nakpil clan, he was raised in Dasmariñas, Cavite.

Campos attended De La Salle Zobel for his elementary and high school educations. He later attended De La Salle University, where he obtained his Bachelor of Arts degree in Political Science in 1989 and Masters in Business Administration degree in 1991. He later attended Ateneo de Manila Law School to pursue legal education.

== Business career ==
Campos opened the Botong’s Resto Bar in Makati and was a partner in Andres, a Filipino restaurant.

== Political career ==
=== House of Representatives (2016–2025) ===
Campos started his political career as the successor to his wife and current Makati mayor Abby Binay on the congressional seat for the 2nd district in 2016. During his first term in the 17th Congress, he was the deputy minority leader, member of the House Committee on Rules, vice chairperson of the House Committee on Public Accounts, and district chairman of the Boy Scouts of the Philippines for Makati. He was re-elected in 2019 and in 2022. He is the vice chairperson of the House Committee on Appropriations and member of the House Committee on Metro Manila Development and House Committee on Ways and Means during the 19th Congress. As representative, he supported the death penalty bill in 2017 and the absolute divorce bill in 2024.

=== 2025 Makati mayoralty bid ===
When he was term-limited alongside his wife Abby as mayor, Campos filed his candidacy for mayor of Makati in 2025, with fellow Makati representative Kid Peña from the 1st district as his vice mayoralty running-mate. While Peña won, Campos lost to his sister-in-law Nancy Binay by 29,234 votes, having placed second with 85,664 votes.

== Personal life ==
Campos married fellow lawyer Abby Binay in 2008. They first met at the Ateneo Law School in 1998. Together, they have a daughter named Martina.

== Electoral history ==
Electoral history of Luis Campos Jr.
| Year | Office | Party | | Votes received | | | | Result |
| Year | Office | Local | National | Total | % | P. | Swing | Result |
|---|---|---|---|---|---|---|---|---|
| 2016 | Representative (Makati–2nd) | —N/a | UNA | 79,748 | 54.01% | 1st | —N/a | Won |
| 2019 | Representative (Makati–2nd) | —N/a | NPC | 90,736 | 57.44% | 1st | —N/a | Won |
| 2022 | Representative (Makati–2nd) | MKTZNU | NPC | 164,948 | 91.75% | 1st | —N/a | Won |
| 2025 | Mayor of Makati | MKTZNU | NPC | 85,664 | 41.97% | 2nd | —N/a | Lost |
