= Philippine House Committee on Dangerous Drugs =

Standing committee of the House of Representatives of the Philippines

Committee on Dangerous Drugs
- 20th Congress

History
- New session started: July 28, 2025

Leadership
- Chair: Jonathan Keith Flores, Lakas since July 29, 2025
- Minority Leader: Vacant since June 30, 2025

Website
- Committee on Dangerous Drugs

The Philippine House Committee on Dangerous Drugs, or House Dangerous Drugs Committee is a standing committee of the Philippine House of Representatives.

== Jurisdiction ==
As prescribed by House Rules, the committee's jurisdiction includes the following:

- Controlled precursors and essential chemicals
- Illegal or prohibited drugs
- Production, manufacture, use and trafficking of illegal drugs
- Rehabilitation and treatment of drug dependents

== Members, 20th Congress ==
Position	Member	Constituency	Party
Chairperson	Jonathan Keith Flores	Bukidnon–2nd	Lakas
Vice Chairpersons	Vacant		
Members for the Majority	Vacant		
Members for the Minority	Vacant		

== Historical membership rosters ==
=== 19th Congress ===
Position	Members	Party	Province/City	District
Chairperson	Robert Ace Barbers	Nacionalista	Surigao del Norte	2nd
Vice Chairpersons	Dean Asistio	Lakas–CMD	Caloocan	3rd
Vice Chairpersons	Romeo Acop	NUP	Antipolo	2nd
Vice Chairpersons	Jorge Antonio P. Bustos	Patrol	Party-list	
Vice Chairpersons	Rachel "Cutie" del Mar	NPC	Cebu City	1st
Vice Chairpersons	Arnulf Bryan Fuentebella	NPC	Camarines Sur	4th
Vice Chairpersons	Richard Gomez	PFP	Leyte	4th
Members for the Majority	Jonathan Keith Flores	Lakas–CMD	Bukidnon	2nd
Members for the Majority	Jude Acidre	Tingog	Party-list	
Members for the Majority	Jason P. Almonte	Nacionalista	Misamis Occidental	1st
Members for the Majority	Rommel T. Angara	LDP	Aurora	At-large
Members for the Majority	Dale Corvera	Lakas–CMD	Agusan del Norte	2nd
Members for the Majority	Gerville "Jinky Bitrics" Luistro	Lakas–CMD	Batangas	2nd
Members for the Majority	Sancho Fernando F. Oaminal	Lakas–CMD	Misamis Occidental	2nd
Members for the Majority	Romulo "Kid" Peña Jr.	NPC	Makati	1st
Members for the Majority	Ray T. Reyes	Anakalusugan	Party-list	

=== 18th Congress ===
Position	Members	Party	Province/City	District
Chairperson	Robert Ace Barbers	Nacionalista	Surigao del Norte	2nd
Vice Chairpersons	Narciso Bravo Jr.	NUP	Masbate	1st
Vice Chairpersons	Edgar Mary Sarmiento	NUP	Samar	1st
Vice Chairpersons	Alan 1 B. Ecleo	PDP–Laban	Dinagat Islands	Lone
Vice Chairpersons	Pablo C. Ortega	NPC	La Union	1st
Vice Chairpersons	Jorge Antonio P. Bustos	Patrol	Party-list	
Vice Chairpersons	Arnulf Bryan Fuentebella	NPC	Camarines Sur	4th
Members for the Majority	Frederick Siao	Nacionalista	Iligan	Lone
Members for the Majority	Romeo "Jon-jon" Jalosjos Jr.	Nacionalista	Zamboanga del Norte	1st
Members for the Majority	Samantha Louise Vargas-Alfonso	NUP	Cagayan	2nd
Members for the Majority	Rashidin Matba	PDP–Laban	Tawi-Tawi	Lone
Members for the Majority	Fernando Cabredo	PDP–Laban	Albay	3rd
Members for the Majority	Elpidio Barzaga Jr.	NUP	Cavite	4th
Members for the Majority	Adolph Edward "Eddiebong" Plaza	NUP	Agusan del Sur	2nd
Members for the Majority	Strike Revilla	NUP	Cavite	2nd
Members for the Majority	John Marvin "Yul Servo" Nieto	NUP	Manila	3rd
Members for the Majority	Horacio Suansing Jr.	NUP	Sultan Kudarat	2nd
Members for the Majority	Rolando M. Valeriano	NUP	Manila	2nd
Members for the Majority	Lorna Bautista-Bandigan	NPC	Davao Occidental	Lone
Members for the Majority	Manuel Luis Lopez	NPC	Manila	1st
Members for the Majority	Edward Maceda	NPC	Manila	4th
Members for the Majority	Precious Castelo	NPC	Quezon City	2nd
Members for the Majority	Luis Campos Jr.	NPC	Makati	2nd
Members for the Majority	Josephine Ramirez-Sato	Liberal	Occidental Mindoro	Lone
Members for the Majority	Romulo Peña Jr.	Liberal	Makati	1st
Members for the Majority	Wilton Kho	PDP–Laban	Masbate	3rd
Members for the Majority	Joseph Lara	PDP–Laban	Cagayan	3rd
Members for the Majority	Esmael Mangudadatu	PDP–Laban	Maguindanao	2nd
Members for the Majority	Emmarie Ouano-Dizon	PDP–Laban	Cebu	6th
Members for the Majority	Joselito Sacdalan	PDP–Laban	Cotabato	1st
Members for the Majority	Datu Roonie Sinsuat Sr.	PDP–Laban	Maguindanao	1st
Members for the Majority	Jesus Manuel Suntay	PDP–Laban	Quezon City	4th
Members for the Majority	Samier Tan	PDP–Laban	Sulu	1st
Members for the Majority	Henry Villarica	PDP–Laban	Bulacan	4th
Members for the Majority	Josefina Tallado	PDP–Laban	Camarines Norte	1st
Members for the Majority	Alfredo "Pido" Garbin Jr.	Ako Bicol	Party-list	
Members for the Majority	Manuel Cabochan	Magdalo	Party-list	
Members for the Majority	Leonardo Babasa Jr.	PDP–Laban	Zamboanga del Sur	2nd
Members for the Majority	Macnell M. Lusotan	Marino	Party-list	
Members for the Majority	Julienne Baronda	NUP	Iloilo City	Lone
Members for the Minority	Arnolfo Teves Jr.	PDP–Laban	Negros Oriental	3rd
Members for the Minority	Sergio Dagooc	APEC	Party-list	
Members for the Minority	France Castro	ACT-Teachers	Party-list	
Members for the Minority	Argel Joseph Cabatbat	Magsasaka	Party-list	

==== Member for the Majority ====
- Nestor Fongwan (Note: Died on December 18, 2019.) (Benguet–Lone, PDP–Laban)

== See also ==
- House of Representatives of the Philippines
- List of Philippine House of Representatives committees
- Comprehensive Dangerous Drugs Act of 2002
- Philippine drug war
- Illegal drug trade in the Philippines
- Philippine Drug Enforcement Agency
- Dangerous Drugs Board
