= 2019 Philippine House of Representatives elections in Metro Manila =

Elections were held in Metro Manila (the National Capital Region) for seats in the House of Representatives of the Philippines on May 13, 2019.

The candidate with the most votes won that district's seat for the 18th Congress of the Philippines.

== Summary ==
Party	Popular vote	%	Swing	Seats won	Change
PDP–Laban				12	
Liberal				4	
NPC				4	
Nacionalista				3	
Asenso				2	
Aksyon				1	
KABAKA				1	
Navoteño				1	
PFP				1	
PMP				1	
DPP				0	
Lakas				0	
NUP				0	
KDP				0	
PDDS				0	
UNA				0	
Independent				0	
Valid votes				30	
Invalid votes					
Turnout					
Registered voters					

== Caloocan ==
=== 1st District ===
Incumbent representative Dale Gonzalo Malapitan is running for reelection unopposed.

2019 Philippine House of Representatives election in Caloocan's 1st District
Party	Candidate	Votes	%
PDP–Laban	Dale Gonzalo "Along" Malapitan (incumbent)	284,851	100.0
Valid ballots		284,851	88.2
Invalid or blank votes		38,165	11.8
Total votes		323,016	100.0
PDP–Laban hold			

=== 2nd District ===
Incumbent Edgar Erice is running for reelection.

2019 Philippine House of Representatives election in Caloocan's 2nd District
Party	Candidate	Votes	%
Liberal	Edgar Erice (incumbent)	124,223	90.3
NUP	Noel Cabuhat	13,349	9.7
Valid ballots		137,572	89.5%
Invalid or blank votes		16,165	10.5
Total votes		153,737	100.0
Liberal hold			

== Las Piñas ==
The seat is currently vacant after incumbent Mark Villar was appointed as DPWH Secretary. Legislative caretaker, incumbent DIWA Partylist Representative Emmelie Aglipay-Villar is barred for seeking a seat due to term limits. The candidates running for the position are Jerry delos Reyes and former TV host and businesswoman Camille Villar.

2019 Philippine House of Representatives election in Las Piñas City
Party	Candidate	Votes	%
Nacionalista	Camille Villar	173,917	89.8
Independent	Jerry delos Reyes	19,791	10.2
Valid ballots		193,708	92.8%
Invalid or blank votes		15,028	7.2%
Total votes		208,736	100.0
Nacionalista hold			

== Makati ==
=== 1st District ===
Incumbent Monsour del Rosario is running for Vice Mayor. The candidates running for the position are former Vice President Jejomar Binay, Brigido Mesina, Jr., former Mayor Romulo "Kid" Peña Jr. and Ferdinand Silva.

2019 Philippine House of Representatives election in Makati's 1st District
Party	Candidate	Votes	%
Liberal	Romulo "Kid" Peña Jr.	71,035	48.3
UNA	Jejomar Binay	65,229	44.3
Independent	Brigido Mesina, Jr.	1,213	0.8
Independent	Ferdinand Sevilla	728	0.5
Valid ballots		138,205	93.9
Invalid or blank votes		8,959	6.1
Total votes		147,164	100.0
Liberal gain from PDP–Laban			

=== 2nd District ===
2019 Philippine House of Representatives election in Makati's 2nd District
Party	Candidate	Votes	%
NPC	Luis Campos (incumbent)	90,736	57.4
PDP–Laban	Nemesio "King" Yabut, Jr.	63,245	40.0
Independent	Rodolfo Flores	2,293	1.5
Independent	Ricardo Opoc	1,687	1.1
Valid ballots		157,961	91.0
Invalid or blank votes		15,702	9.0
Total votes		173,663	100.0
NPC hold			

== Malabon ==
Incumbent Federico "Ricky" Sandoval is running for reelection. His opponent is former Representative Josephine "Jaye" Lacson-Noel.

2019 Philippine House of Representatives election in Malabon's Lone District
Party	Candidate	Votes	%
NPC	Josephine Veronique Lacson-Noel	86,001	56.7
PDP–Laban	Federico "Ricky" Sandoval II (incumbent)	65,629	43.3
Valid ballots		151,630	90.9
Invalid or blank votes		11,980	9.1
Total votes		163,610	100.0
NPC gain from PDP–Laban			

== Mandaluyong ==
Incumbent Queenie Gonzales is running for reelection, but later withdrew. Her husband, former Representative Neptali Gonzales II replaced her.

2019 Philippine House of Representatives election in Mandaluyong's Lone District
Party	Candidate	Votes	%
PDP–Laban	Neptali Gonzales II	127,268	100.0
Valid ballots		127,268	86.2
Invalid or blank votes		20,308	13.8
Total votes		147,576	100.0
PDP–Laban hold			

== Manila ==
=== 1st District ===
Manuel Luis "Manny" Lopez is the incumbent, and he will face former congressman Benjamin "Atong" Asilo.

2019 Philippine House of Representatives election in the Manila's 1st District
Party	Candidate	Votes	%
NPC	Manny Lopez (incumbent)	86,993	54.27
PMP	Benjamin "Atong" Asilo	73,306	45.73
Valid ballots		160,299	93.9
Invalid or blank votes		10,368	6.1
Total votes		170,667	100.00
NPC hold			

=== 2nd District ===
Carlo Lopez is the incumbent, and is term-limited. His cousin Alex is running under the Nacionalista Party, with support from PMP and KABAKA; Carlo is a member of PDP–Laban. Also running are incumbent councilors Rolan Valeriano (Asenso Manileño) and Rodolfo "Ninong" Lacsamana (NUP). The coalition of PDP–Laban and KKK did not nominate any candidate in this district.

2019 Philippine House of Representatives election in the Manila's 2nd District
Party	Candidate	Votes	%
Asenso	Rolan Valeriano	34,861	36.52
Nacionalista	Alex Lopez	32,215	33.75
NUP	Rodolfo "Ninong" Lacsamana	28,379	29.73
Valid ballots		95,455	95.0
Invalid or blank votes		5,062	5.0
Total votes		100,517	100.00
Asenso gain from PDP–Laban			

=== 3rd District ===
John Marvin "Yul Servo" Nieto is the incumbent, and is running under the PDP-Laban banner with support from Asenso Manileño. He will face former representative Zenaida "Naida" Angping, who is running under Lakas–CMD and supported by PMP and KABAKA.

2019 Philippine House of Representatives election in the Manila's 3rd District
Party	Candidate	Votes	%
PDP–Laban	John Marvin "Yul Servo" Nieto (incumbent)	65,153	67.81
Lakas	Zenaida Angping	30,925	32.19
Valid ballots		96,078	94.5
Invalid or blank votes		5,571	5.5
Total votes		101,649	100.00
PDP–Laban hold			

=== 4th District ===
Edward Maceda is the incumbent and will run against ex-Rep. Maria Theresa "Trisha" Bonoan-David (NUP, supported by Asenso Manileño) and independent candidate barangay kagawad Christopher "Chris" Gabriel.

2019 Philippine House of Representatives election in the Manila's 4th District
Party	Candidate	Votes	%
PMP	Edward Maceda (incumbent)	63,298	60.19
NUP	Maria Theresa Bonoan-David	30,238	28.75
Independent	Christopher Gabriel	11,621	11.06
Valid ballots		105,157	94.1
Invalid or blank votes		6,574	5.9
Total votes		111,731	100.00
PMP hold			

=== 5th District ===
Amanda Christina "Cristal" Bagatsing is the incumbent, and will face former councilor Arnold "Ali" Atienza.

2019 Philippine House of Representatives election in the Manila's 5th District
Party	Candidate	Votes	%
KABAKA	Amanda Cristina "Crystal" Bagatsing (incumbent)	65,836	50.41
Lakas	Arnold "Ali" Atienza	64,748	49.59
Valid ballots		130,584	93.5
Invalid or blank votes		9,020	6.5
Total votes		139,604	100.00
KABAKA hold			

=== 6th District ===
Rosenda Ann "Sandy" Ocampo is the incumbent but she is now term-limited. She has endorsed her younger sister Patricia Yvette Ocampo, to run for her seat in the House of Representatives. Yvette registered as a candidate under Bagumbayan-VNP (supported by PDP-Laban and Alfredo Lim's KKK Party) and prior to her candidacy had been appointed by President Rodrigo Roa Duterte as chair of the Nayong Pilipino Foundation.

Ocampo's archrival, ex-Cong. Bienvenido "Benny" Abante, is also running under Asenso Manileño.

2019 Philippine House of Representatives election in the Manila's 6th District
Party	Candidate	Votes	%
Asenso	Bienvenido Abante	49,795	46.21
Bagumbayan	Patricia Yvette Ocampo	33,731	31.30
PMP	Casimiro "Cassy" Sison	24,239	22.49
Valid ballots		107,765	96.2
Invalid or blank votes		4,223	3.8
Total votes		107,765	100.00
Asenso gain from PDP–Laban			

== Marikina ==
=== 1st District ===
Incumbent Representative Bayani Fernando is running for reelection unopposed. Vice Mayor Jose Fabian Cadiz remained on the ballot despite withdrawing.

2019 Philippine House of Representatives election in Marikina's 1st District
Party	Candidate	Votes	%
NPC	Bayani Fernando (incumbent)	56,553	80.4
Liberal	Jose Fabian Cadiz	13,732	19.5
Valid ballots		70,335	89.2
Invalid or blank votes		8,521	10.8
Total votes		78,856	100.0
NPC hold			

=== 2nd District ===
Incumbent Representative Miro Quimbo is term-limited.

2019 Philippine House of Representatives election in Marikina's 2nd District
Party	Candidate	Votes	%
Liberal	Stella Quimbo	79,598	83.8
Independent	Eugene Michael De Vera	13,995	14.7
Independent	Mauro Arce	1,461	1.5
Valid ballots		95,054	93.5
Invalid or blank votes		6,646	6.5
Total votes		101,700	100.0
Liberal hold			

== Muntinlupa ==
Incumbent Representative Ruffy Biazon is running for reelection.

2019 Philippine House of Representatives election in Muntinlupa's Lone District
Party	Candidate	Votes	%
PDP–Laban	Ruffy Biazon (incumbent)	169,756	81.5
UNA	Rafael Arciaga	36,317	17.4
DPP	Rodolfo Llorica	2,326	1.1
Valid ballots		208,399	92.5
Invalid or blank votes		16,827	7.5
Total votes		225,226	100.0
PDP–Laban hold			

== Navotas ==
Incumbent representative Toby Tiangco is term-limited and is running for mayor. His brother, incumbent Mayor John Reynald Tiangco is his party's nominee.

2019 Philippine House of Representatives election in Navotas's Lone District
Party	Candidate	Votes	%
Navoteño	John Reynald "John Rey" Tiangco	80,265	70.14
Aksyon	Marielle del Rosario-Tumangan	30,050	26.28
Valid ballots		110,315	96.4
Invalid or blank votes		4,093	3.6
Total votes		114,408	100.00
Navoteño hold			

== Parañaque ==
=== 1st District ===
Incumbent Representative Eric Olivarez is running for reelection.

2019 Philippine House of Representatives election in Parañaque's 1st District
Party	Candidate	Votes	%
PDP–Laban	Eric Olivarez (incumbent)	74,692	84.5
Lakas	Jaime Delos Santos	13,743	15.5
Valid ballots		88,435	93.3
Invalid or blank votes		6,351	6.7
Total votes		94,786	100.0
PDP–Laban hold			

=== 2nd District ===
Incumbent Representative Gustavo Tambunting is running for reelection, but eventually withdrew. His wife, Joy Tambunting substituted him.

2019 Philippine House of Representatives election in Parañaque's 2nd District
Party	Candidate	Votes	%
PDP–Laban	Joy Tambunting	103,967	89.5
Independent	Pacifico Rosal	12,248	10.5
Valid ballots		116,215	85.0
Invalid or blank votes		20,307	15.0
Total votes		136,522	100.0
PDP–Laban hold			

== Pasay ==
Incumbent representative Imelda Calixto-Rubiano is term-limited and is running for mayor. Her brother, incumbent Mayor Antonino Calixto is her party's nominee.

2019 Philippine House of Representatives election in Pasay's Lone District
Party	Candidate	Votes	%
PDP–Laban	Antonino “Tony” G. Calixto	136,519	76.5
NPC	Efren “Choy” L. Alas	22,372	12.6
Independent	Elmer G. Mitra	12,662	7.1
DPP	Metel Gelbolingo	3,980	2.2
Independent	Pedro “Pete” G. Ordiales	2,850	1.6
Valid ballots		178,383	90.5
Invalid or blank votes		18,748	9.5
Total votes		197,131	100.0
PDP–Laban hold			

== Pasig ==
Incumbent Representative Ricky Eusebio is running for reelection. His opponent is former Congressman Roman Romulo.

2019 Philippine House of Representatives election in Pasig's Lone District
Party	Candidate	Votes	%
Aksyon	Roman Romulo	225,217	69.6
Nacionalista	Richard Eusebio (incumbent)	98,547	30.4
Valid ballots		323,764	96.1
Invalid or blank votes		12,818	3.9
Total votes		336,582	100.0
Aksyon gain from Nacionalista			

== Quezon City ==
=== 1st District ===
Incumbent representative Vincent Crisologo is running for mayor. His son, incumbent councilor Onyx Crisologo is the party's nominee. His opponent is councilor Elizabeth Delarmente.

2019 Philippine House of Representatives election in the Quezon City's 1st District
Party	Candidate	Votes	%
PDP–Laban	Anthony Peter Crisologo	74,033	55.2
NPC	Elizabeth Delarmente	56,833	42.3
Independent	Andres Samson	3,327	2.5
Valid ballots		134,193	93.7
Invalid or blank votes		9,092	6.3
Total votes		134,193	100.00
PDP–Laban hold			

=== 2nd District ===
Incumbent Representative Winston Castelo is term-limited and is running for councilor. His wife, Precious Hipolito-Castelo will run for congresswoman. Her opponents are former representatives Annie Susano, Dante Liban and Winsell Beltran-Codora, daughter of Barangay Silangan captain Crisell Beltran.

2019 Philippine House of Representatives election in the Quezon City's 2nd District
Party	Candidate	Votes	%
NPC	Precious Hipolito-Castelo	109,515	54.3
KDP	Mary Ann Susano	48,924	24.3
PFP	Dante Liban	23,089	11.4
PDP–Laban	Winsell Beltran-Cordora	15,108	7.5
Independent	Virgilio Garcia	5,032	2.5
Valid ballots		201,668	91.6
Invalid or blank votes		18,463	8.4
Total votes		220,131	100.0

=== 3rd District ===
Incumbent Representative Jorge Banal is term-limited.

2019 Philippine House of Representatives election in the Quezon City's 3rd District
Party	Candidate	Votes	%
PFP	Allan Benedict Reyes	70,184	74.5
PDP–Laban	Dante de Guzman	22,204	23.6
PDDS	Jessie Dignadice	1,826	1.9
Valid ballots		94,214	88.3
Invalid or blank votes		12,459	11.7
Total votes		106,673	100.0
PFP gain from Liberal			

=== 4th District ===
Incumbent Representative Feliciano Belmonte Jr. is term-limited and he is set to retire from politics after 27 years. His nominee, former Councilor Bong Suntay will run for that position.

2019 Philippine House of Representatives election in the Quezon City's 4th District
Party	Candidate	Votes	%
PDP–Laban	Jesus "Bong" Suntay	103,338	85.2
Independent	Kit Rodriguez	17,991	14.8
Valid ballots		121,329	85.7
Invalid or blank votes		20,185	14.3
Total votes		141,514	100.00
PDP–Laban gain from Independent			

=== 5th District ===
Incumbent Representative Alfred Vargas is running for re-election.

2019 Philippine House of Representatives election in the Quezon City's 5th District
Party	Candidate	Votes	%
PDP–Laban	Alfred Vargas	132,047	85.7
Independent	Angelito Francisco	9,064	5.9
Independent	Rey Miranda	7,585	4.9
Lakas	Joel Miranda	2,813	1.8
Independent	Victor Francisco	2,527	1.7
Valid ballots		151,509	90.5
Invalid or blank votes		15,852	9.5
Total votes		167,361	100.00
PDP–Laban hold			

=== 6th District ===
Incumbent Representative Kit Belmonte is running for re-election.

2019 Philippine House of Representatives election in the Quezon City's 6th District
Party	Candidate	Votes	%
Liberal	Christopher "Kit" Belmonte	94,673	83.1
PDP–Laban	Johnny Domino	17,607	15.5
PDDS	Maria Cecilia Fabilane	1,604	1.4
Valid ballots		151,509	90.5
Invalid or blank votes		15,852	9.5
Total votes		167,361	100.00
Liberal hold			

== San Juan ==
Incumbent Representative Ronaldo Zamora is running for reelection. His opponent is actor Edu Manzano.

2019 Philippine House of Representatives election in San Juan's Lone District
Party	Candidate	Votes	%
PDP–Laban	Ronaldo Zamora (incumbent)	35,386	60.0
PMP	Edu Manzano	23,627	40.0
Valid ballots		59,013	96.3
Invalid or blank votes		2,239	3.7
Total votes		61,252	100.0
PDP–Laban hold			

== Taguig and Pateros ==
=== 1st District of Taguig and Pateros ===
Incumbent Congressman Arnel Cerafica is term-limited and is running for mayor. His brother, Allan Cerafica, will compete for the position against former Foreign Affairs Secretary Alan Peter Cayetano.

2019 Philippine House of Representatives election in Pateros-Taguig Lone District
Party	Candidate	Votes	%
Nacionalista	Alan Peter Cayetano	91,993	58.8
PDP–Laban	Allan Cerafica	63,641	40.6
Independent	Gloria Cabrera	829	0.5
PFP	Kamarozaman Rajahmuda	132	0.1
Valid ballots		156,595	96.5
Invalid or blank votes		5,597	3.5
Total votes		162,192	100.0
Nacionalista gain from PDP–Laban			

=== 2nd District of Taguig ===
Incumbent Congresswoman Pia Cayetano has opted to run for senator. Competing in her place is her sister-in-law and term limited incumbent Mayor Lani Cayetano, who will be facing former Councilor Michelle Anne Gonzales.

2019 Philippine House of Representatives election in Taguig's Lone District
Party	Candidate	Votes	%
Nacionalista	Lani Cayetano	113,226	72.9
PDP–Laban	Michelle Anne Gonzales	42,012	27.1
Valid ballots		155,238	96.6
Invalid or blank votes		4,524	3.4
Total votes		159,762	100.0
Nacionalista hold			

== Valenzuela ==
=== 1st District ===
Incumbent representative is Weslie Gatchalian.

2019 Philippine House of Representatives election in the 1st District of Valenzuela
Party	Candidate	Votes	%
NPC	Weslie "Wes" T. Gatchalian (incumbent)	119,372	100.0
Valid ballots		119,372	96.8
Invalid or blank votes		4,820	3.2
Total votes		124,192	100.0
NPC hold			

=== 2nd District ===
Incumbent representative is Eric Martinez.

2019 Philippine House of Representatives election in the 2nd District of Valenzuela
Party	Candidate	Votes	%
PDP–Laban	Eric M. Martinez (incumbent)	106,848	73.8
Lakas	Magtanggol "Magi" T. Gunigundo	37,935	26.2
Valid ballots		144,783	90.9
Invalid or blank votes		11,980	9.1
Total votes		156,763	100.0
PDP–Laban hold			
