= Makatizens United Party =

Filipino political party based in Makati

- Leader: Abigail Binay
- Secretary-General: Joseph Joel Castillo
- Founder: Abigail Binay
- Founded: 2021
- Headquarters: Makati
- Ideology: Localism
- National affiliation: Bagong Pilipinas (2024–present); NPC (2024–present)
- Colors: Blue
- House of Representatives: 2 / 2 (Makati City Seats only)
- Mayor: 0 / 1
- Vice Mayor: 1 / 1
- City Council: 9 / 16

The Makatizens United Party (MKTZNU) is a Makati-based local political organization in the Philippines. MKTZNU was led and founded by former Makati Mayor Abigail Binay.

== History ==
The party was formed in 2021, ahead of the 2022 elections, wherein its leader, then-Makati Mayor Abby Binay, was running for her third and final consecutive term. She previously ran in 2019 under the United Nationalist Alliance.

In the elections, almost the whole slate won, as they only lost 1 seat in the council in the elections in 2nd district.

For the 2025 elections, Abby Binay joined Nationalist People's Coalition, and was selected to the Alyansa para sa Bagong Pilipinas senatorial slate of President Bongbong Marcos. Her husband and 2nd district congressman Luis Campos ran to replace her position as mayor, with 1st district congressman and former vice mayor Kid Peña as his running mate. Incumbent Vice Mayor Monique Lagdameo ran for her previous position, the 1st district congressional seat to replace Peña, while Councilor Dennis Almario ran to replace Campos' position at the 2nd district. While Peña, Lagdameo, Almario, and 9 out of 16 candidates for councilor won the election, Campos lost to Nancy Binay, Abby's sister who ran under the United Nationalist Alliance.

== Electoral performance ==
=== Makati mayoral and vice mayoral elections ===
Year	Mayoral election				Vice mayoral election			
Year	Candidate	Votes	Vote share	Result	Candidate	Votes	Vote share	Result
2022	Abby Binay	338,819	95.32%	Won	Monique Lagdameo	314,070	93.32%	Won
2025 (Note: Both Luis Campos and Kid Peña are affiliated with the NPC and are listed on the ballot under this national party.)	Luis Campos	85,664	41.97%	Lost	Kid Peña	146,771	73.00%	Won

=== Legislative elections ===
City Council			House of Representatives districts from Makati		
Year	Seats won	Result	Year	Seats won	Result
2022 (Note: All of the candidates were MKTZNU in the ballots.)	15 / 16	Majority	2022 (Note: Some of the members is named with a national party in the ballot: Luis Campos (NPC) and Kid Peña (Liberal))	2 / 2	Split
2025	9 / 16	Majority	2025	2 / 2	Joined the majority bloc

== Notable members ==
=== City executives ===
- Abby Binay (former Mayor of Makati; founder)
- Kid Peña (Vice Mayor of Makati)

=== National legislators ===
- Alden Almario (Makati's 2nd district representative)
- Luis Campos (former Makati's 2nd district representative)
- Monique Lagdameo (Makati's 1st district representative; co-founder)

=== City legislators ===
- Jhong Hilario (former first district councilor)
