= Philippine House Committee on Metro Manila Development =

Standing committee of the House of Representatives of the Philippines

Committee on Metro Manila Development
- 20th Congress

History
- New session started: To convene on July 28, 2025

Leadership
- Chairman: Vacant
- Minority Leader: Vacant

Website
- Committee on Metro Manila Development

The Philippine House Committee on Metro Manila Development, or House Metro Manila Development Committee is a standing committee of the Philippine House of Representatives.

== Jurisdiction ==
As prescribed by House Rules, the committee's jurisdiction is on the policies and programs to promote and enhance the development of the Metro Manila area which comprises 16 cities and 1 municipality.

== Members, 20th Congress ==
As of June 30, 2025, all committee membership positions are vacant until the House convenes for its first regular session on July 28.

== Historical membership rosters ==
=== 18th Congress ===
Position	Members	Party	Province/City	District
Chairperson	Manuel Luis Lopez	NPC	Manila	1st
Vice Chairpersons	Edgar Erice	Liberal	Caloocan	2nd
Vice Chairpersons	Rolando Valeriano	NUP	Manila	2nd
Vice Chairpersons	Eric Martinez	PDP–Laban	Valenzuela	2nd
Vice Chairpersons	Precious Castelo	NPC	Quezon City	2nd
Vice Chairpersons	Aloysia Lim	RAM	Party-list	
Members for the Majority	Allan Benedict Reyes	PFP	Quezon City	3rd
Members for the Majority	Weslie Gatchalian	NPC	Valenzuela	1st
Members for the Majority	Camille Villar	Nacionalista	Las Piñas	Lone
Members for the Majority	Ma. Laarni Cayetano	Nacionalista	Taguig	2nd
Members for the Majority	Joy Myra Tambunting	NUP	Parañaque	2nd
Members for the Majority	John Marvin Nieto	NUP	Manila	3rd
Members for the Majority	Jose Antonio Sy-Alvarado	NUP	Bulacan	1st
Members for the Majority	Strike Revilla	NUP	Cavite	2nd
Members for the Majority	Edward Maceda	PMP	Manila	4th
Members for the Majority	Roman Romulo	Aksyon	Pasig	Lone
Members for the Majority	John Reynald Tiangco	Partido Navoteño	Navotas	Lone
Members for the Majority	Juan Fidel Felipe Nograles	Lakas	Rizal	2nd
Members for the Majority	Dale Malapitan	PDP–Laban	Caloocan	1st
Members for the Majority	Rozzano Rufino Biazon	PDP–Laban	Muntinlupa	Lone
Members for the Majority	Anthony Peter Crisologo	NUP	Quezon City	1st
Members for the Majority	Alfred Vargas	PDP–Laban	Quezon City	5th
Members for the Majority	Jesus Manuel Suntay	PDP–Laban	Quezon City	4th
Members for the Majority	Ronaldo Zamora	PDP–Laban	San Juan	Lone
Members for the Majority	Antonino Calixto	PDP–Laban	Pasay	Lone
Members for the Majority	Romulo Peña Jr.	Liberal	Makati	1st
Members for the Majority	Arnulf Bryan Fuentebella	NPC	Camarines Sur	4th
Members for the Majority	Vincent Garcia	HNP	Davao City	2nd
Members for the Majority	Virgilio Lacson	MANILA TEACHERS	Party-list	
Members for the Majority	Luis Campos Jr.	NPC	Makati	2nd
Members for the Majority	Cristal Bagatsing	PDP–Laban	Manila	5th
Members for the Majority	Gerardo Espina Jr.	Lakas	Biliran	Lone
Members for the Majority	Henry Villarica	PDP–Laban	Bulacan	4th
Members for the Majority	Eric Olivarez	PDP–Laban	Parañaque	1st
Members for the Minority	Stella Luz Quimbo	Liberal	Marikina	2nd
Members for the Minority	Arnolfo Teves Jr.	PDP–Laban	Negros Oriental	3rd

==== Vice Chairperson ====
- Francisco Datol Jr. (Note: Died on August 10, 2020.) (SENIOR CITIZENS)

== See also ==
- House of Representatives of the Philippines
- List of Philippine House of Representatives committees
- Metropolitan Manila Development Authority
