= Makati's 2nd congressional district =

Congressional district of the Philippines

- Constituency for the House of Representatives of the Philippines
- Boundary of Makati's 2nd congressional district in Makati, with the barangays now part of Taguig in light red
- Location of Makati within Metro Manila

- Defunct boundary of Makati's 2nd congressional district (1998–2023)
- City: Makati
- Region: Metro Manila
- Population: 40,444 (2024)
- Electorate: 54,088 (2025)
- Major settlements: 3 barangays: Guadalupe Nuevo; Guadalupe Viejo; Pinagkaisahan
- Area: 0.78 km^{2} (0.30 sq mi)

Current constituency
- Created: 1995
- Representative: Alden Almario
- Political party: MKTZNU
- Congressional bloc: Majority

Makati's 2nd congressional district is one of the two legislative districts in Makati. It has been represented in the House of Representatives of the Philippines since 1995. The district consists of three barangays in northeastern Makati: Guadalupe Nuevo, Guadalupe Viejo, and Pinagkaisahan. The ten Embo barangays—Cembo, Comembo, East Rembo, Pembo, Pitogo, Post Proper Northside, Post Proper Southside, Rizal, South Cembo and West Rembo—were formerly part of the district until 2023, when their jurisdiction was transferred from Makati to Taguig, following the resolution of the territorial dispute between the two cities. It is currently represented in the 20th Congress by Alden Almario of Makatizens United Party (MKTZNU).

The district was created in 1995 when Makati was granted cityhood. However, its first representative-elect, Agapito Aquino, was disqualified before he could take office that year due to lack of residency. There were no special elections held to fill vacancy. As a result, Makati was effectively represented by one representative until 1998.

The fate of the second district is uncertain due to the Supreme Court ruling on the Makati–Taguig territorial dispute due to the remaining barangays not fulfilling the constitutional requirement of 250,000 residents. Makati could be reduced back to a single district. Pending legislation, the status quo of its existence, despite it being reduced to three barangays, is expected to prevail. However, since 2025, voters from the Embo barangays do not vote for the representative of this district as they were reapportioned between the two existing districts of Taguig–Pateros.

== Representation history ==
#	Image	Member	Term of office		Congress	Party	Electoral history	Constituent LGUs
#	Image	Member	Start	End	Congress	Party	Electoral history	Constituent LGUs
=== Makati's 2nd district for the House of Representatives of the Philippines ===
District created January 2, 1995 from Makati's at-large district.
1		Butz Aquino (1939–2015)	–	–	10th	LDP	Elected in 1995. Disqualified by the Commission on Elections due to lack of residency.	1995–1996; Cembo, Comembo, East Rembo, Guadalupe Nuevo, Guadalupe Viejo, Pembo, Pinagkaisahan, Pitogo, Post Proper Northside, Post Proper Southside, South Cembo, West Rembo
1		Butz Aquino (1939–2015)	June 30, 1998	June 30, 2007	11th	LAMMP	Elected in 1998.	1996–2023; Cembo, Comembo, East Rembo, Guadalupe Nuevo, Guadalupe Viejo, Pembo, Pinagkaisahan, Pitogo, Post Proper Northside, Post Proper Southside, Rizal, South Cembo, West Rembo
1		Butz Aquino (1939–2015)	June 30, 1998	June 30, 2007	12th	LDP	Re-elected in 2001.	1996–2023; Cembo, Comembo, East Rembo, Guadalupe Nuevo, Guadalupe Viejo, Pembo, Pinagkaisahan, Pitogo, Post Proper Northside, Post Proper Southside, Rizal, South Cembo, West Rembo
1		Butz Aquino (1939–2015)	June 30, 1998	June 30, 2007	13th	LDP	Re-elected in 2004.	1996–2023; Cembo, Comembo, East Rembo, Guadalupe Nuevo, Guadalupe Viejo, Pembo, Pinagkaisahan, Pitogo, Post Proper Northside, Post Proper Southside, Rizal, South Cembo, West Rembo
2		Abigail Binay (born 1975)	June 30, 2007	June 30, 2016	14th	PDP–Laban	Elected in 2007.	1996–2023; Cembo, Comembo, East Rembo, Guadalupe Nuevo, Guadalupe Viejo, Pembo, Pinagkaisahan, Pitogo, Post Proper Northside, Post Proper Southside, Rizal, South Cembo, West Rembo
2		Abigail Binay (born 1975)	June 30, 2007	June 30, 2016	15th	PDP–Laban	Re-elected in 2010.	1996–2023; Cembo, Comembo, East Rembo, Guadalupe Nuevo, Guadalupe Viejo, Pembo, Pinagkaisahan, Pitogo, Post Proper Northside, Post Proper Southside, Rizal, South Cembo, West Rembo
2		Abigail Binay (born 1975)	June 30, 2007	June 30, 2016	16th	UNA	Re-elected in 2013.	1996–2023; Cembo, Comembo, East Rembo, Guadalupe Nuevo, Guadalupe Viejo, Pembo, Pinagkaisahan, Pitogo, Post Proper Northside, Post Proper Southside, Rizal, South Cembo, West Rembo
3		Luis Campos (born 1967)	June 30, 2016	June 30, 2025	17th	UNA	Elected in 2016.	1996–2023; Cembo, Comembo, East Rembo, Guadalupe Nuevo, Guadalupe Viejo, Pembo, Pinagkaisahan, Pitogo, Post Proper Northside, Post Proper Southside, Rizal, South Cembo, West Rembo
3		Luis Campos (born 1967)	June 30, 2016	June 30, 2025	18th	NPC (MKTZNU)	Re-elected in 2019.	1996–2023; Cembo, Comembo, East Rembo, Guadalupe Nuevo, Guadalupe Viejo, Pembo, Pinagkaisahan, Pitogo, Post Proper Northside, Post Proper Southside, Rizal, South Cembo, West Rembo
3		Luis Campos (born 1967)	June 30, 2016	June 30, 2025	19th	NPC (MKTZNU)	Re-elected in 2022.	1996–2023; Cembo, Comembo, East Rembo, Guadalupe Nuevo, Guadalupe Viejo, Pembo, Pinagkaisahan, Pitogo, Post Proper Northside, Post Proper Southside, Rizal, South Cembo, West Rembo
4		Alden Almario (born 1971)	June 30, 2025	Incumbent	20th	MKTZNU	Elected in 2025.	2023–present Guadalupe Nuevo, Guadalupe Viejo, Pinagkaisahan

== Election results ==
=== 2025 ===
2025 Philippine House of Representatives election in the 2nd District of Makati
Candidate	Party	Votes	%
Alden Almario	Makatizens United Party	19,834	55.19
Vincent Sese	United Nationalist Alliance	16,101	44.81
Total		35,935	100.00
Valid votes		35,935	66.44
Invalid/blank votes		18,153	33.56
Total votes		54,088	100.00
Makatizens United Party gain from Nationalist People's Coalition			

=== 2022 ===
2022 Philippine House of Representatives election at Makati's 2nd District
Party	Candidate	Votes	%
NPC	Luis Campos	164,948	91.75%
Independent	Ricardo Opoc	14,838	8.25%
Total votes		179,786	100.00
NPC hold			

=== 2019 ===
2019 Philippine House of Representatives election at Makati's 2nd District
Party	Candidate	Votes	%
NPC	Luis Campos	90,736	57.44%
PDP–Laban	Nemesio "King" Yabut, Jr.	63,245	40.03%
Independent	Rodolfo Flores	2,293	1.45%
Independent	Ricardo Opoc	1,687	1.06%
Total votes		157,961	100.00
NPC hold			

=== 2016 ===
2016 Philippine House of Representatives election in Makati's 2nd District
Party	Candidate	Votes	%
UNA	Luis Campos	79,748	54.01
Liberal	Israel Cruzado	62,145	42.09
PBM	Levi Perez	3,394	2.30
Independent	Joel Sarza	1,248	0.85
Independent	Marvin "Vin" Porciuncula	1,111	0.75
Total votes		147,646	100.00
UNA hold			

=== 2013 ===
2013 Philippine House of Representatives election at Makati's 2nd District
Party	Candidate	Votes	%
UNA	Abigail Binay	107,620	83.47
Independent	Joel Sarza	7,319	5.68
Invalid or blank votes		13,992	10.85
Total votes		128,931	100.00
UNA hold			

=== 2010 ===
Philippine House of Representatives election at Makati's 2nd District
Party	Candidate	Votes	%
PDP–Laban	Abigail Binay	81,475	62.49
Nacionalista	Ernesto Aspillaga	35,497	27.23
Bigkis	John Christian Montes	13,402	10.28
Valid ballots		134,630	92.02
Invalid or blank votes		11,682	7.98
Total votes		146,312	100.00
PDP–Laban hold			

=== 2007 ===
2007 Philippine House of Representatives election at Makati's 2nd District
Party	Candidate	Votes	%
PDP–Laban	Abigail Binay	70,904	63.25
Lakas	Erwin Genuino	41,191	36.75
Total votes		112,095	100.00
PDP–Laban gain from LDP			

=== 2004 ===
2004 Philippine House of Representatives election at Makati's 2nd District
Party	Candidate	Votes	%
LDP	Butz Aquino	86,937	79.44
Lakas	Antonio Manalili	22,499	20.56
Total votes		109,436	100.00
LDP hold			

=== 2001 ===
2001 Philippine House of Representatives election at Makati's 2nd District
Party	Candidate	Votes	%
LDP	Butz Aquino	56,737	63.37
Lakas	Ana Luz Cristal-Tenorio	31,883	35.61
Independent	Sherwin Dimacali	894	1.00
Independent	Rizalito David	17	0.02
Total votes		89,531	100.00
LDP hold			

=== 1998 ===
Candidate	Party	Votes	%
Butz Aquino	Laban ng Makabayang Masang Pilipino	76,807	65.85
Antonio Manalili	Lakas–NUCD–UMDP	19,971	17.12
Roberto Brillante	Partido para sa Demokratikong Reporma	10,334	8.86
Billy Bibit	Independent	9,232	7.92
Ramon Delloro	Kilusang Bagong Lipunan	294	0.25
Total		116,638	100.00
Laban ng Makabayang Masang Pilipino win (new seat)			
Source: Commission on Elections

=== 1995 ===
Candidate	Party	Votes	%
Butz Aquino	Laban ng Demokratikong Pilipino	38,547	41.34
Augusto Syjuco Jr.	Lakas–NUCD–UMDP	35,910	38.52
Nemesio Yabut Jr.	Nationalist People's Coalition	10,059	10.79
Billy Bibit	Independent	8,626	9.25
Ramon Delloro	Independent	91	0.10
Total		93,233	100.00
Election nullified			
Source: Commission on Elections, The Lawphil Project

== See also ==
- Legislative districts of Makati
