= Reform Party (Philippines) =

Filipino political party

- President: James Layug
- Founder: James Layug
- Founded: 2021
- Dissolved: June 10, 2024; 2 years ago
- Split from: Magdalo
- Succeeded by: Reform PH
- Ideology: Reformism
- Colors: Blue

The Reform Party was a Filipino political party established in October 2021. It was merged with some members of Reform the Armed Forces Movement (RAM) on June 10, 2024, to form the Reform PH.

== History ==
=== Reform Party ===
In October 2021, the Reform Party was established by DICT Assistant Secretary James Layug to support the then-Bong Go's vice presidential campaign. That time, Bong Go tops the vice presidential surveys. Days after their formation, Reform Party signed an agreement of partnership with PDP–Laban's Cusi-Duterte faction.

Gringo Honasan who running for a Senate comeback also joined the party. The party also endorsed the candidacy of Bongbong Marcos as president, and Sara Duterte as vice president.

=== Merger and formation as Reform PH Party ===
On June 10, 2024, former senator Gringo Honasan and some of his colleagues from the now-defunct Reform the Armed Forces Movement (RAM) met at the Club Filipino in San Juan, Metro Manila to form the party. Some members of Magdalo joined the Reform PH.

== Electoral performance ==
=== Presidential and vice presidential ===
Year	Presidential election				Vice presidential election			
Year	Candidate	Votes	Vote share	Result	Candidate	Votes	Vote share	Result
2022	None (Note: Party endorsed candidacy of Ferdinand Marcos, Jr. from the (PFP) won)			Ferdinand Marcos, Jr. (PFP)	None (Note: Party endorsed candidacy of running mate Sara Duterte from the (Lakas–CMD) won)			Sara Z. Duterte (Lakas)

=== Legislative elections ===
Congress of the Philippines
Year	Seats won	Result	Year	Seats won	Ticket	Result
2022	0 / 316	PDP plurality	2022	Did not participate		UniTeam win 6/12 seats
