= Abigail Binay =

Filipino lawyer and politician (born 1975)

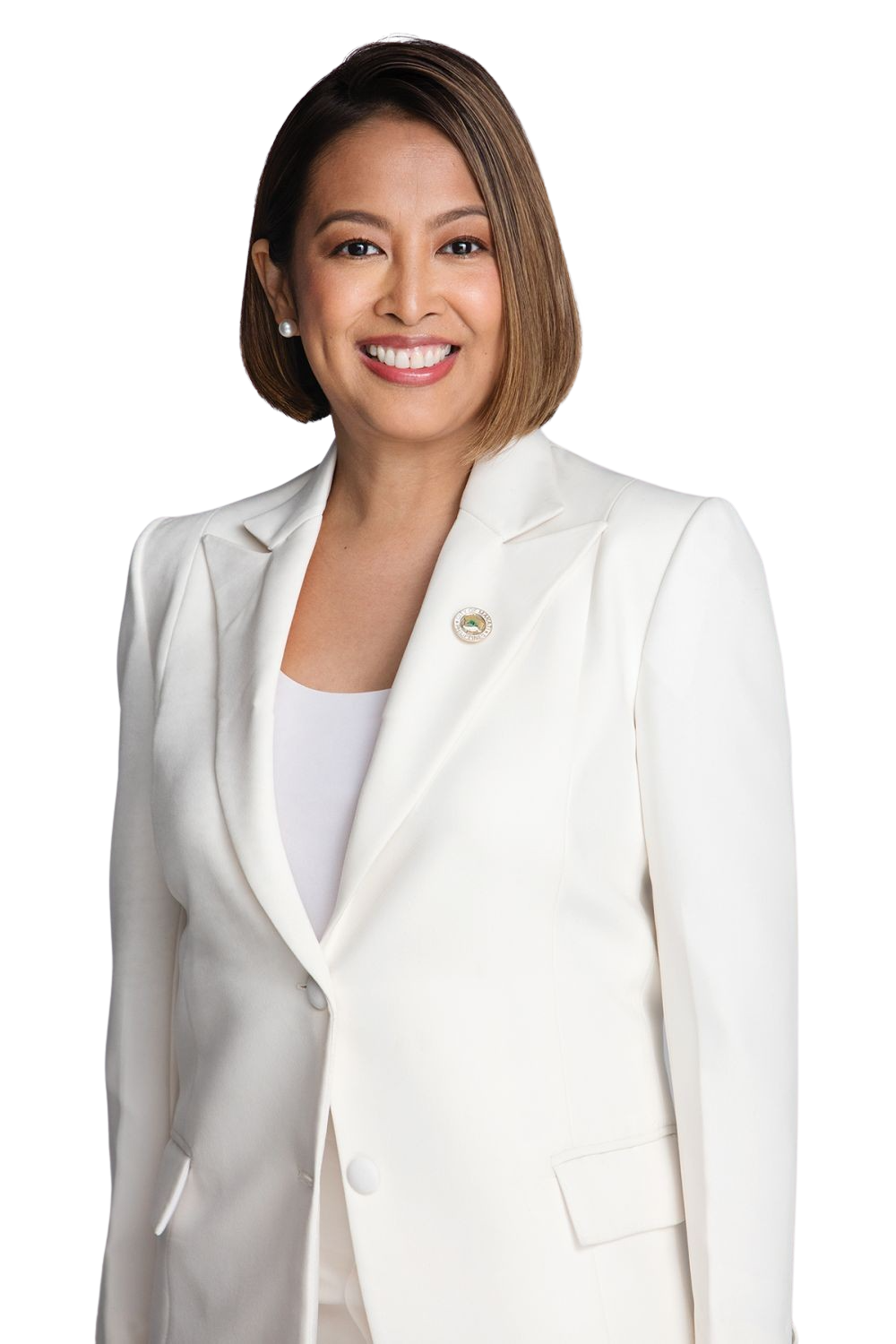
- Official portrait, 2022

21st Mayor of Makati
- In office June 30, 2016 – June 30, 2025
- Vice Mayor: Monique Lagdameo
- Preceded by: Kid Peña (acting)
- Succeeded by: Nancy Binay

Member of the Philippine House of Representatives from Makati's 2nd congressional district
- In office June 30, 2007 – June 30, 2016
- Preceded by: Butz Aquino
- Succeeded by: Luis Campos

Personal details
- Born: Mar-len Abigail Sombillo Binay; December 12, 1975 (age 50) Quezon City, Philippines
- Party: NPC (2024–present); Makatizens United Party (2021–present)
- Other political affiliations: UNA (2012–2021); PDP–Laban (2006–2012)
- Spouse: Luis Campos (m. 2008)
- Relations: Nancy Binay (sister); Junjun Binay (brother)
- Children: 1
- Parents: Jejomar Binay (father); Elenita Binay (mother)
- Education: University of the Philippines Los Baños (BS); Ateneo de Manila University (JD)
- Occupation: Politician
- Profession: Lawyer

Mar-len Abigail "Abby" Sombillo Binay-Campos (born December 12, 1975) is a Filipino lawyer and politician who served as Mayor of Makati from 2016 to 2025. She formerly served in the Congress as Representative of Makati's 2nd District from 2007 to 2016, when she was succeeded by her husband, Luis Campos. She is also the daughter of former Vice President Jejomar Binay.

== Early life and education ==
Binay was born on December 12, 1975 in Quezon City, as the second of five children and the second of four daughters of lawyer Jejomar Binay and Dr. Elenita Sombillo. She is the younger sister of Nancy Binay, a former Senator and her eventual successor as Mayor of Makati, and the older sister of Junjun Binay, the former mayor of Makati.

She studied at the University of the Philippines Los Baños and received her bachelor's degree in human ecology, majoring in human settlements planning. She continued to the Ateneo de Manila Law School, graduating in 2001. She passed the Philippine Bar Examination in 2002.

== Political career ==
At a young age, Binay started her career at MABINI under former Senator Rene Saguisag as part of the defense counsel for the soldiers involved in the Oakwood mutiny.

=== House of Representatives (2007–2016) ===
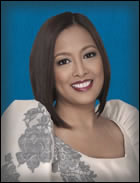
Binay official portrait during the 16th Congress.

In 2007, she was elected representative of Makati's 2nd District, succeeding Butz Aquino and passed several bills under her watch.

=== Mayor of Makati (2016–2025) ===
In the wake of her brother Junjun's ouster as Makati mayor by the Ombudsman of the Philippines in 2015, Binay announced her candidacy as Mayor of Makati, inviting fellow Makati representative Monique Lagdameo of the 1st district as vice mayor of the city competing with acting mayor Romulo Peña Jr. and Karla Mercado.

On May 9, 2016, Binay and Lagdameo won the mayoral and vice-mayoral election, respectively. They took their oath of office on June 27, 2016. Abby's first day as Mayor of Makati began three days later on June 30, and by that time her father's term as vice president already expired.

As a result, Binay is the fourth Binay family member to become mayor of Makati. Overall, she is also the second female mayor of Makati after her mother Elenita, who served from 1998 to 2001. She was re-elected in 2019, wherein she also defeated her brother Junjun, and in 2022.

In 2019, Binay was named as the Regional Chairperson for the National Capital Region of the Boy Scouts of the Philippines. In 2021, she founded the Makatizens United Party ahead of her 2022 re-election campaign. In 2023, United Nations Secretary-General António Guterres appointed Binay to his Advisory Group on Local and Regional Governments, co-chaired by Pilar Cancela Rodríguez and Fatimatou Abdel Malick.

=== 2025 Senate bid ===
On May 28, 2024, Binay took oath as a new member of the Nationalist People's Coalition. On September 26, 2024, Binay was named as a senatorial candidate for the Alyansa para sa Bagong Pilipinas in the 2025 elections. She later formalized her Senate bid on October 4, 2024. Binay would go on to lose the election, placing 15th, garnering 11,808,645 votes.

=== Makati–Taguig territorial dispute ===
In 2022, the Supreme Court ruled with finality that the Fort Bonifacio Military Reservation, which includes the Embo barangays, is confirmed as part of Taguig. Binay claimed that the dispute is "not yet over", stating that her office has received a notice that the Supreme Court has set its case with Taguig for oral arguments. This was contradicted by Supreme Court spokesperson Brian Keith Hosaka, who stated that there are no such documents. The Taguig City Government slammed Binay's comment and also expressed belief that her meeting with President Bongbong Marcos, First Lady Liza Araneta Marcos and Chief Justice Alexander Gesmundo was meant to "undermine the probity of our highest officials and subvert the people's trust in the impartiality of justice". Taguig's mayor sought sanctions against Binay for the statement.

Owing to the loss of the Embo barangays and being term-limited as mayor, Binay has expressed interest in running for Mayor of Taguig. To seek the office, Binay would need to resign as mayor of Makati to establish at least one year of residency in Taguig to be eligible for the post. On January 9, 2024, Binay remarked that she is "waiting for a sign" for her to push through with her campaign in Taguig; she indicated that she would finalize her decision by March 2024. Manuel L. Quezon III of the Philippine Daily Inquirer described Binay's potential campaign for mayor of Taguig as a "dynastic invasion" motivated by Makati's loss of the Embo barangays.

== Personal life ==
Binay is married to fellow lawyer Luis Campos, whom she met at the Ateneo Law School in 1998, since 2008. Together, they have one daughter named Martina.

After her term as Mayor of Makati, Binay began hosting her podcast entitled Breaking Balls with Abby Binay, which was launched in December 2025.

== Electoral history ==
Electoral history of Abigail Binay
Year	Office	Party		Votes received				Result
Year	Office	Local	National	Total	%	P.	Swing	Result
2007	Representative (Makati–2nd)	—N/a	PDP–Laban	70,904	63.25%	1st	—N/a	Won
2010	Representative (Makati–2nd)	—N/a	PDP–Laban	81,475	62.49%	1st	-0.76	Won
2013	Representative (Makati–2nd)	—N/a	UNA	107,620	83.47%	1st	+20.98	Won
2016	Mayor of Makati	—N/a	UNA	160,320	52.66%	1st	—N/a	Won
2019	Mayor of Makati	—N/a	UNA	179,522	58.26%	1st	+5.60	Won
2022	Mayor of Makati	MKTZNU	—N/a	338,819	95.32%	1st	+37.06	Won
2025	Senator of the Philippines	—N/a	NPC	11,808,645	20.59%	15th	—N/a	Lost
