= Monique Lagdameo =

Filipino politician

Monique Lagdaméo
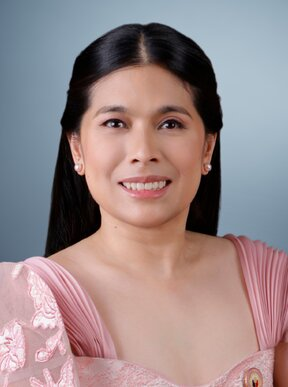
- Official portrait, 2026

Member of the Philippine House of Representatives from Makati's 1st district
- Incumbent
- Assumed office June 30, 2025
- Preceded by: Kid Peña
- In office June 30, 2010 – June 30, 2016
- Preceded by: Teodoro Locsin Jr.
- Succeeded by: Monsour del Rosario

Vice Mayor of Makati
- In office June 30, 2016 – June 30, 2025
- Mayor: Abigail Binay
- Preceded by: Leonardo Magpantay (acting)
- Succeeded by: Kid Peña

Regional President of the Vice Mayors' League of the Philippines for the National Capital Region
- In office July 13, 2022 – June 30, 2025
- Preceded by: Luis Macario Asistio
- Succeeded by: Angelo Agcaoili (interim)

Member of the Makati City Council from the 1st District
- In office June 30, 2004 – June 30, 2010

Consultant, Sangguniang Kabataan Federation, Makati
- In office 2002–2004

Sangguniang Kabataan Federation President - Makati
- In office 2001–2002

Sangguniang Kabataan Chairman of Barangay Forbes Park, Makati
- In office 1996–2002

Member of the Sangguniang Kabataan Council of Barangay Forbes Park, Makati
- In office 1992–1996

Personal details
- Born: Monique Yazmin María Quirino Lagdameo; July 25, 1975 (age 51) Ermita, Manila, Philippines
- Party: Makatizens United Party (2021–present)
- Other political affiliations: UNA (2012–2021); PDP–Laban (2004–2012)
- Relations: Antonio Quirino (grandfather); Elpidio Quirino (granduncle)
- Education: De La Salle University (BS)
- Occupation: Politician

Monique Yazmin María "Nik" Quirino Lagdameo (born July 25, 1975) is a Filipino politician who is the representative for Makati's first district, serving since 2025. She previously held the seat from 2010 to 2016 and has served as the vice mayor of Makati from 2016 to 2025, under the mayoralty of Abigail Binay.

== Early life and education ==
Lagdameo was born on July 25, 1975, to Militza Quirino and Enrique Lagdameo. She is a granddaughter of ABS-CBN co-founder Antonio Quirino and a great-niece of President Elpidio Quirino. She graduated Bachelor of Science in commerce (Legal Management) from De La Salle University in 1995.

== Political career ==
Lagdaméo entered politics in 1992 as a member of the Sangguniang Kabataan (SK) council of Barangay Forbes Park, Makati. In 1996, she then became the SK Chair, holding the position until 2002. Concurrently, from 2001 to 2002, she was named as the SK Federation Chairperson for Makati, a sectoral representative position on the Makati City Council. She would then become the Consultant of the SK Federation from 2002 to 2003.

In 2004, she was elected as the City Councilor of Makati from the 1st district. She was then re-elected in 2007.

In 2010, she was elected Representative of Makati's 1st District, succeeding Teodoro Locsin Jr., running under the PDP–Laban party. She was then re-elected in 2013, this time under the United Nationalist Alliance.

In the wake of Junjun Binay's ouster as Makati mayor by the Ombudsman of the Philippines in 2015, Lagdaméo announced her candidacy as Vice Mayor of Makati running with fellow Representative Abigail Binay as Mayor of the city competing with the tandem of Romulo "Kid" Peña Jr. and Karla Mercado. On May 9, 2016, Lagdaméo alongside Abigail Binay, won the vice-mayoral and mayoral elections, respectively. Took their oath of office on June 27, 2016. Lagdaméo's first day as Vice Mayor of Makati began three days later on June 30. As a result, the Binay-Lagdaméo tandem became the first female duo to head as Mayor and Vice Mayor respectively. She was re-elected in 2019 and in 2022, which was under Makatizens United Party.

In July 2022, Lagdameo was named as the President of the Vice Mayors League for the National Capital Region, succeeding former Caloocan Vice Mayor Luis Macario "Maca" Asistio.

Upon being term-limited, Lagdameo ran for Representative of Makati's 1st District in 2025 and won.

House of Representatives of the Philippines
Preceded by Kid Peña	Member of the House of Representatives from Makati's 1st district 2025–present	Incumbent
Preceded by Teodoro Locsin Jr.	Member of the House of Representatives from Makati's 1st district 2010–2016	Succeeded by Monsour del Rosario
Political offices
Preceded by Leonardo Magpantay (acting)	Vice Mayor of Makati; 2016–2025	Succeeded by Kid Peña
