= Reform PH =

Filipino political party formed in 2024

- Leader: Gringo Honasan
- President: James Layug
- Founder: Gringo Honasan; James Layug
- Founded: June 10, 2024; 2 years ago
- Merger of: Reform Party; Reform the Armed Forces Movement
- Split from: Magdalo
- Ideology: Reformism; Economic liberalism
- National affiliation: RAGE Coalition (2026–present)
- Colors: Maroon

The Reform PH, officially as Reform PH – People's Party, is a Filipino political party established in June 2024.

== History ==
On June 10, 2024, former senator Gringo Honasan and some of his colleagues from the now-defunct Reform the Armed Forces Movement (RAM) met at the Club Filipino in San Juan, Metro Manila to form the party. Some members of Magdalo and Reform Party founded by Agriculture assistant secretary James Layug joined. Former congressman Willy Villarama and former congressman Mike Defensor also joined the said meeting.

The Reform PH served as a vehicle to Honasan's attempted comeback campaign for Senate during 2025 election.

== Political positions ==
Former Magdalo member and ex-Navy Captain James Layug said that the party's formation was to aim reformism and new brand of politics for the country. The party also aims to protect environment and for truthful service of public servants.

In regards to the South China Sea dispute, Reform PH has proposed the establishment of paramilitary groups to enforce the sovereignty claims of the Philippines.

== Candidates ==
=== 2025 ===
==== Senate ====
- Gregorio Honasan (lost)

== Electoral performance ==
Congress of the Philippines
House of Representatives			Senate			
Year	Seats won	Result	Year	Seats won	Ticket	Result
2025	0 / 317	Lakas plurality	2025	0 / 12	Single party	Bagong Pilipinas plurality 6/12
