= Makati's 1st congressional district =

Congressional district of the Philippines

- Constituency for the House of Representatives of the Philippines
- Boundary of Makati's 1st congressional district in Makati
- Location of Makati within Metro Manila
- City: Makati
- Region: Metro Manila
- Population: 254,600 (2020)
- Electorate: 216,152 (2025)
- Major settlements: 20 barangays: Bangkal; Bel-Air; Carmona; Dasmariñas; Forbes Park; Kasilawan; La Paz; Magallanes; Olympia; Palanan; Pio del Pilar; Poblacion; San Antonio; San Isidro; San Lorenzo; Santa Cruz; Singkamas; Tejeros; Urdaneta; Valenzuela
- Area: 16.31 km^{2} (6.30 sq mi)

Current constituency
- Created: 1995
- Representative: Monique Lagdameo
- Political party: MKTZNU
- Congressional bloc: Majority

Makati's 1st congressional district is one of the two congressional districts of the Philippines in the city of Makati. It has been represented in the House of Representatives of the Philippines since 1995. The district consists of barangays in western Makati, namely Bangkal, Bel-Air, Carmona, Dasmariñas, Forbes Park, Kasilawan, La Paz, Magallanes, Olympia, Palanan, Pio del Pilar, Poblacion, San Antonio, San Isidro, San Lorenzo, Santa Cruz, Singkamas, Tejeros, Urdaneta, and Valenzuela. It is the location of the Makati Central Business District and the Makati City Hall. It is currently represented in the 20th Congress by Monique Lagdameo of the Makatizens United Party (MKTZNU).

== Representation history ==
#	Image	Member	Term of office		Congress	Party	Electoral history	Constituent LGUs
#	Image	Member	Start	End	Congress	Party	Electoral history	Constituent LGUs
=== Makati's 1st district for the House of Representatives of the Philippines ===
District created January 2, 1995 from Makati's at-large district.
1		Joker Arroyo (1927–2015)	June 30, 1995	June 30, 2001	10th	Independent	Redistricted from the at-large district and re-elected in 1995.	1995–present Bangkal, Bel-Air, Carmona, Dasmariñas, Forbes Park, Kasilawan, La Paz, Magallanes, Olympia, Palanan, Pio del Pilar, Poblacion, San Antonio, San Isidro, San Lorenzo, Santa Cruz, Singkamas, Tejeros, Urdaneta, Valenzuela
1		Joker Arroyo (1927–2015)	June 30, 1995	June 30, 2001	11th	LAMMP	Re-elected in 1998.	1995–present Bangkal, Bel-Air, Carmona, Dasmariñas, Forbes Park, Kasilawan, La Paz, Magallanes, Olympia, Palanan, Pio del Pilar, Poblacion, San Antonio, San Isidro, San Lorenzo, Santa Cruz, Singkamas, Tejeros, Urdaneta, Valenzuela
1		Joker Arroyo (1927–2015)	June 30, 1995	June 30, 2001	11th	Lakas	Re-elected in 1998.	1995–present Bangkal, Bel-Air, Carmona, Dasmariñas, Forbes Park, Kasilawan, La Paz, Magallanes, Olympia, Palanan, Pio del Pilar, Poblacion, San Antonio, San Isidro, San Lorenzo, Santa Cruz, Singkamas, Tejeros, Urdaneta, Valenzuela
2		Teodoro Locsin Jr. (born 1948)	June 30, 2001	June 30, 2010	12th	PDP–Laban	Elected in 2001.	1995–present Bangkal, Bel-Air, Carmona, Dasmariñas, Forbes Park, Kasilawan, La Paz, Magallanes, Olympia, Palanan, Pio del Pilar, Poblacion, San Antonio, San Isidro, San Lorenzo, Santa Cruz, Singkamas, Tejeros, Urdaneta, Valenzuela
2		Teodoro Locsin Jr. (born 1948)	June 30, 2001	June 30, 2010	13th	PDP–Laban	Re-elected in 2004.	1995–present Bangkal, Bel-Air, Carmona, Dasmariñas, Forbes Park, Kasilawan, La Paz, Magallanes, Olympia, Palanan, Pio del Pilar, Poblacion, San Antonio, San Isidro, San Lorenzo, Santa Cruz, Singkamas, Tejeros, Urdaneta, Valenzuela
2		Teodoro Locsin Jr. (born 1948)	June 30, 2001	June 30, 2010	14th	PDP–Laban	Re-elected in 2007.	1995–present Bangkal, Bel-Air, Carmona, Dasmariñas, Forbes Park, Kasilawan, La Paz, Magallanes, Olympia, Palanan, Pio del Pilar, Poblacion, San Antonio, San Isidro, San Lorenzo, Santa Cruz, Singkamas, Tejeros, Urdaneta, Valenzuela
3		Monique Lagdameo (born 1975)	June 30, 2010	June 30, 2016	15th	PDP–Laban	Elected in 2010.	1995–present Bangkal, Bel-Air, Carmona, Dasmariñas, Forbes Park, Kasilawan, La Paz, Magallanes, Olympia, Palanan, Pio del Pilar, Poblacion, San Antonio, San Isidro, San Lorenzo, Santa Cruz, Singkamas, Tejeros, Urdaneta, Valenzuela
3		Monique Lagdameo (born 1975)	June 30, 2010	June 30, 2016	16th	UNA	Re-elected in 2013.	1995–present Bangkal, Bel-Air, Carmona, Dasmariñas, Forbes Park, Kasilawan, La Paz, Magallanes, Olympia, Palanan, Pio del Pilar, Poblacion, San Antonio, San Isidro, San Lorenzo, Santa Cruz, Singkamas, Tejeros, Urdaneta, Valenzuela
4		Monsour del Rosario (born 1962)	June 30, 2016	June 30, 2019	17th	UNA	Elected in 2016.	1995–present Bangkal, Bel-Air, Carmona, Dasmariñas, Forbes Park, Kasilawan, La Paz, Magallanes, Olympia, Palanan, Pio del Pilar, Poblacion, San Antonio, San Isidro, San Lorenzo, Santa Cruz, Singkamas, Tejeros, Urdaneta, Valenzuela
4		Monsour del Rosario (born 1962)	June 30, 2016	June 30, 2019	17th	PDP–Laban	Elected in 2016.	1995–present Bangkal, Bel-Air, Carmona, Dasmariñas, Forbes Park, Kasilawan, La Paz, Magallanes, Olympia, Palanan, Pio del Pilar, Poblacion, San Antonio, San Isidro, San Lorenzo, Santa Cruz, Singkamas, Tejeros, Urdaneta, Valenzuela
5		Romulo Peña Jr. (born 1969)	June 30, 2019	June 30, 2025	18th	Liberal (MKTZNU)	Elected in 2019.	1995–present Bangkal, Bel-Air, Carmona, Dasmariñas, Forbes Park, Kasilawan, La Paz, Magallanes, Olympia, Palanan, Pio del Pilar, Poblacion, San Antonio, San Isidro, San Lorenzo, Santa Cruz, Singkamas, Tejeros, Urdaneta, Valenzuela
5		Romulo Peña Jr. (born 1969)	June 30, 2019	June 30, 2025	19th	NPC (MKTZNU)	Re-elected in 2022.	1995–present Bangkal, Bel-Air, Carmona, Dasmariñas, Forbes Park, Kasilawan, La Paz, Magallanes, Olympia, Palanan, Pio del Pilar, Poblacion, San Antonio, San Isidro, San Lorenzo, Santa Cruz, Singkamas, Tejeros, Urdaneta, Valenzuela
(3)		Monique Lagdameo (born 1975)	June 30, 2025	Incumbent	20th	MKTZNU	Elected in 2025.	1995–present Bangkal, Bel-Air, Carmona, Dasmariñas, Forbes Park, Kasilawan, La Paz, Magallanes, Olympia, Palanan, Pio del Pilar, Poblacion, San Antonio, San Isidro, San Lorenzo, Santa Cruz, Singkamas, Tejeros, Urdaneta, Valenzuela

== Election results ==
=== 2025 ===
2025 Philippine House of Representatives election in the 1st District of Makati
Candidate	Party	Votes	%
Monique Lagdameo	Makatizens United Party	130,355	89.82
Angelo Base	Independent	8,324	5.74
Minnie Antonio	Independent	6,458	4.45
Total		145,137	100.00
Valid votes		145,137	67.15
Invalid/blank votes		71,015	32.85
Total votes		216,152	100.00
Makatizens United Party gain from Nationalist People's Coalition			

=== 2022 ===
2022 Philippine House of Representatives election in the 1st District of Makati
Party	Candidate	Votes	%
Liberal	Romulo "Kid" Peña Jr. (Incumbent)	146,131	94.87%
Independent	Minnie Antonio	4,801	3.12%
Independent	Ferdinand Sevilla	3,104	2.02%
Total votes		154,036	100.00
Liberal hold			

=== 2019 ===
2019 Philippine House of Representatives election in Makati's 1st District
Party	Candidate	Votes	%
Liberal	Romulo "Kid" Peña, Jr.	71,035	51.39%
UNA	Jejomar Binay	65,229	47.19%
Independent	Brigido Mesina, Jr.	1,213	0.87%
Independent	Ferdinand Sevilla	728	0.55%
Total votes		138,205	100.00%
Liberal gain from PDP–Laban			

=== 2016 ===
2016 Philippine House of Representatives election in Makati's 1st District
Party	Candidate	Votes	%
UNA	Manuel Monsour del Rosario	76,728	60.27
Liberal	Nico Garcia	38,377	30.14
NPC	Willy Talag	6,043	4.75
Independent	Eugenia Carreon	3,580	2.81
Independent	Lourdesiree Latimer	2,584	2.03
Total votes		127,312	100.00
UNA hold			

=== 2013 ===
2013 Philippine House of Representatives election at Makati's 1st district
Party	Candidate	Votes	%
UNA	Monique Lagdameo	86,881	70.98
Independent	Virgilio Batalla	8,249	6.74
Ang Kapatiran	Edilberto Cuenca	4,611	3.77
Independent	Miguel Lopez, Jr.	3,182	2.60
Invalid or blank votes		19,476	15.91
Total votes		122,399	100.00
UNA hold			

=== 2010 ===
Philippine House of Representatives election at Makati's 1st district
Party	Candidate	Votes	%
PDP–Laban	Monique Lagdameo	42,102	33.52
Liberal	Maria Lourdes Locsin	41,860	33.32
Independent	Robert Dean Barbers	25,990	20.69
Bigkis	Oscar Ibay	14,993	11.94
KBL	Oswaldo Carbonell	668	0.53
Valid ballots		125,613	92.24
Invalid or blank votes		10,564	7.76
Total votes		136,177	100.00
PDP–Laban hold			

=== 2007 ===
2007 Philippine House of Representatives election in Makati's 1st District
Party	Candidate	Votes	%
PDP–Laban	Teodoro Locsin Jr.	85,598	83.03
Lakas	Oscar Ibay	17,489	16.97
Total votes		103,087	100.00
PDP–Laban hold			

=== 2004 ===
2004 Philippine House of Representatives election in Makati's 1st District
Party	Candidate	Votes	%
PDP–Laban	Teodoro Locsin Jr.	96,765	88.71
Lakas	Don Bitanga	12,319	11.29
Total votes		109,084	100.00
PDP–Laban hold			

=== 2001 ===
2001 Philippine House of Representatives election in Makati's 1st District
Party	Candidate	Votes	%
PDP–Laban	Teodoro Locsin Jr.	61,012	62.23
PMP	Armida Siguion-Reyna	23,146	23.61
Lakas	Melinda Silverio	12,585	12.84
Independent	Romeo de Belen	1,295	1.32
Total votes		98,038	100.00
PDP–Laban gain from Lakas			

=== 1998 ===
Candidate	Party	Votes	%
Joker Arroyo (incumbent)	Laban ng Makabayang Masang Pilipino	91,269	70.94
Rose Marie Arenas	Lakas–NUCD–UMDP	34,807	27.05
Alfonso Mike Policarpio	Independent	1,246	0.97
Perfecto Santos	Partido para sa Demokratikong Reporma	1,156	0.90
Adelia Insauriga	PDP–Laban	184	0.14
Total		128,662	100.00
Laban ng Makabayang Masang Pilipino hold			
Source: Commission on Elections

=== 1995 ===
Candidate	Party	Votes	%
Joker Arroyo	Independent	68,092	72.67
Maria Consuelo Puyat-Reyes	Lakas–NUCD–UMDP	19,649	20.97
Enrico Sampang	People's Reform Party	5,961	6.36
Total		93,702	100.00
Independent win (new seat)			
Source: Commission on Elections

== See also ==
- Legislative districts of Makati
