= Kid Peña =

Filipino politician (born 1969)

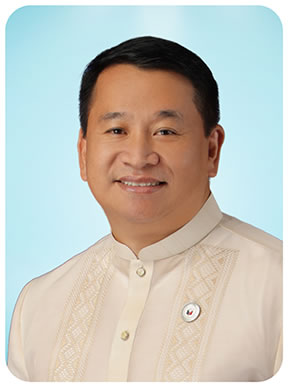
- Official portrait, 2022

Vice Mayor of Makati
- Incumbent
- Assumed office June 30, 2025
- Mayor: Nancy Binay
- Preceded by: Monique Lagdameo
- In office June 30, 2010 – June 30, 2015
- Mayor: Junjun Binay
- Preceded by: Ernesto Mercado
- Succeeded by: Virgilio Hilario Sr. (acting)

Member of the Philippine House of Representatives from Makati's 1st District
- In office June 30, 2019 – June 30, 2025
- Preceded by: Monsour del Rosario
- Succeeded by: Monique Lagdameo

Mayor of Makati
- Officer-In-Charge
- In office June 30, 2015 – June 30, 2016
- Vice Mayor: Virgilio Hilario Sr. (acting, July 2015); Leonardo Magpantay (acting, July 2015–June 2016)
- Preceded by: Junjun Binay
- Succeeded by: Abby Binay

President of the Association of Barangay Captains (ABC), Makati
- In office 2007–2010

Barangay Captain of Valenzuela, Makati
- In office 2005–2010

Member of the Sangguniang Barangay of Valenzuela, Makati
- In office 2002–2005
- In office 1994–1997

Personal details
- Born: Romulo Valderama Peña Jr. August 5, 1969 (age 57) Makati, Rizal, Philippines
- Party: NPC (2024–present); MKTZNU (2021–present)
- Other political affiliations: Liberal (2012–24); Independent (2009–12)
- Spouse: Ma. Priscela Caasi
- Children: 1
- Parents: Romulo O. Peña Sr. (father); Vilma Valderama-Peña (mother)
- Education: Adamson University (AB); De La Salle University (BEc)

Romulo "Kid" Valderama Peña Jr. (born August 5, 1969) is a Filipino politician who is the vice mayor of Makati. He previously held the position from 2010 to 2015 under the mayoralty of Jejomar Binay Jr., which ended with Peña as acting mayor from 2015 to 2016 following Binay's dismissal over contract irregularities related to the construction of Makati Science High School.

Peña previously served as the representative for Makati's first district from 2019 to 2025 and previously served as a barangay kagawad and captain of Barangay Valenzuela.

== Early life ==
Romulo Peña Jr. was born in Makati on August 5, 1969, to Romulo O. Peña Sr. (1936–2006) and Vilma Valderama-Peña (1936–2005).

Peña was once a service crew member, rider, and manager for several fast food restaurants. He graduated from Adamson University with the degree of Bachelor of Arts in Political Science in 1990, as well as a degree holder of Economics from De La Salle University.

== Political career ==
Peña started his career in politics when he volunteered as a youth leader before being elected as Councilor and Chairman of Barangay Valenzuela, Makati. He later became President of the Association of Barangay Captains (ABC) for Makati, making him a sectoral representative in the Makati City Council, from 2007 to 2010.

In the May 2010 elections, he was elected as vice mayor where he ran as an independent candidate and the running mate of outgoing Vice Mayor Ernesto Mercado, who lost his mayoralty bid to 1st district councilor Junjun Binay. He was re-elected in 2013 under the Liberal Party (LP).

Peña was sworn in as acting mayor of Makati at the old city hall building after the Office of the Ombudsman suspended Mayor Junjun Binay and 14 individuals over irregularities on building contracts. He became the second city mayor of Makati not affiliated with the Binay family since 1986 and the first non-Binay since Makati's cityhood in 1995. However, he lost the 2016 election to 2nd district representative Abby Binay.

In the 2019 Philippine midterm elections, Peña made a successful political comeback, defeating former Philippine Vice President Jejomar Binay in a close race for a congressional seat in the 1st district of Makati. He was re-elected in 2022, this time under the ticket of incumbent Mayor Abby Binay.

Peña ran for vice mayor of Makati in 2025, this time under the Nationalist People's Coalition, as the running mate of fellow Makati representative Luis Campos, who ran for mayor, intending to succeed his term-limited wife Abigail. Although Campos lost to his sister-in-law Senator Nancy Binay, Peña won the election as vice mayor. He succeeds Monique Lagdameo, who in turn was elected as the representative of the first district of Makati, effectively swapping positions with each other.

== Personal life ==
Peña is a motorcycle rider and the founder of a community-based riding club named "Tropang Kid". Since its formation in 1994, the riding club has established itself as a growing organization in Makati composed of volunteers who travel around in motorbikes as his companions and as social service carriers.

His brother, George Anthony Peña, is the incumbent barangay captain of Valenzuela, Makati.

Peña is married to Ma. Priscela Caasi. He has a son named Romulo III ("Jaytee").

== Electoral history ==
Electoral history of Kid Peña
Year	Office	Party	Votes received				Result
Year	Office	Party	Total	%	P.	Swing	Result
2010	Vice Mayor of Makati	IND	105,949	40.76%	1st	—N/a	Won
2013	Vice Mayor of Makati	Liberal	120,893	48.10%	1st	+7.34	Won
2025	Vice Mayor of Makati	NPC	146,771	73.00%	1st	+24.90	Won
2016	Mayor of Makati	Liberal	142,257	46.73%	2nd	—N/a	Lost
2019	Representative (Makati–1st)	Liberal	71,035	48.27%	1st	—N/a	Won
2022	Representative (Makati–1st)	Liberal	146,131	94.87%	1st	+46.60	Won

Political offices
Preceded by Monique Lagdameo	Vice Mayor of Makati; 2025–present	Incumbent
Preceded by Junjun Binay	Mayor of Makati; Acting; 2015–2016	Succeeded by Abby Binay
Preceded by Ernesto Mercado	Vice Mayor of Makati; 2010–2015	Succeeded by Virgilio Hilario Sr. Acting
House of Representatives of the Philippines
Preceded by Monsour del Rosario	Member of the House of Representatives from Makati's 1st district 2019–2025	Succeeded by Monique Lagdameo
