= Legislative districts of Makati =

Legislative district of the Philippines

The legislative districts of Makati are the representations of the highly urbanized city of Makati in the various national legislatures of the Philippines. The city is currently represented in the lower house of the Congress of the Philippines through its first and second districts.

== History ==
Makati legislative district map 1st district 2nd district under the jurisdiction of Makati following the Makati–Taguig boundary dispute Former barangays of the 2nd district now under the jurisdiction of Taguig following the Makati–Taguig boundary dispute

Areas now under the jurisdiction of Makati were initially represented as part of the at-large district of the province of Manila in the Malolos Congress from 1898 to 1899. The then-town was later incorporated to the province of Rizal, established in 1901, and was represented as part of the first district of Rizal from 1907 to 1941 and from 1945 to 1972. Then excluding the areas of present-day Embo barangays, Makati was incorporated to the City of Greater Manila during World War II and was represented as part of the at-large district of Manila from 1943 to 1944. Areas now under the jurisdiction of the aforementioned barangays, meanwhile, was part of the at-large district of Rizal during the war-time legislature. Makati was separated from Rizal on November 7, 1975 by virtue of Presidential Decree No. 824, and was represented in the Interim Batasang Pambansa along with other Metropolitan Manila municipalities and cities as part of Region IV from 1978 to 1984.

Makati first gained separate representation in 1984, when it returned one representative to the Regular Batasang Pambansa. The municipality continued to constitute a separate congressional district under the new Constitution proclaimed on February 11, 1987; it elected its member to the restored House of Representatives starting that same year.

Upon its cityhood, Makati was divided into two congressional districts by virtue of Section 52 of Republic Act No. 7854 (the City Charter of Makati), enacted on January 2, 1995 and approved by plebiscite on February 4, 1995, the day Makati became a city. The districts first elected their separate representatives in the 1995 general elections. However, 2nd district representative-elect Agapito Aquino was disqualified before he could assume office due to lack of residency. Aquino's disqualification was later criticized for failing to consider the legal impossibility of meeting the one-year residency requirement in newly created districts that had existed for less than a year. As a result, Joker Arroyo, elected from the 1st district, sat as the only representative of the city for the 10th Congress. Makati only began having two seated representatives following the 1998 elections.

There was a dispute over which city has jurisdiction over lands encompassed within the former Fort McKinley U.S. Military Reservation (now Fort Bonifacio and its surrounding areas). Portions of two of Makati's barangays (Post Proper Northside and Post Proper Southside) were claimed by the neighboring city of Taguig as part of its own four barangays (Fort Bonifacio, Pinagsama, Western Bicutan, and Ususan). Residents of areas where Makati exercised de facto control vote as part of the 2nd congressional district, while residents of areas where Taguig exercised de facto control vote as part of its first congressional district for Ususan and its second congressional district for Fort Bonifacio, Pinagsama, and Western Bicutan.

In April 2023, the Supreme Court has decided to junk Makati's petition to overrule its earlier decision to side with Taguig in the case of the Embo barangays, effectively placing these barangays into the jurisdiction of Taguig. The Department of the Interior and Local Government released a memorandum circular dated October 26, 2023 transferring the control of the ten Embo barangays, including Post Proper Northside and Post Proper Southside, to Taguig. With this, the fate of Makati's 2nd district is uncertain as its remaining barangays of Guadalupe Nuevo, Guadalupe Viejo, and Pinagkaisahan do not fulfill altogether the constitutional requirement of 250,000 residents. Makati could be reduced back to a single district with Taguig–Pateros gaining a district, but pending legislation, the status quo of its existence is expected to prevail. On September 27, 2024, the Embo barangays were finally reapportioned between Taguig–Pateros's two existing districts.

== Historical and defunct district boundaries ==
District boundary changes
Year	Map	District constituencies (City/Municipality)
1984–1986
1984–1986	Lone: Bangkal, Bel-Air, Carmona, Dasmariñas, Forbes Park, Guadalupe Nuevo, Guadalupe Viejo, Kasilawan, La Paz, Magallanes, Olympia, Palanan, Pinagkaisahan, Pio del Pilar, Poblacion, Post Proper Northside, Post Proper Southside, San Antonio, San Isidro, San Lorenzo, Santa Cruz, Singkamas, Tejeros, Urdaneta, Valenzuela	Makati
1987–1996		Makati
1987–1996	Lone: Bangkal, Bel-Air, Carmona, Cembo, Comembo, Dasmariñas, East Rembo, Forbes Park, Guadalupe Nuevo, Guadalupe Viejo, Kasilawan, La Paz, Magallanes, Olympia, Palanan, Pembo, Pinagkaisahan, Pitogo, Pio del Pilar, Poblacion, Post Proper Northside, Post Proper Southside, San Antonio, San Isidro, South Cembo, San Lorenzo, Santa Cruz, Singkamas, Tejeros, Urdaneta, Valenzuela, West Rembo	Makati
1996–1998		Makati
1996–1998	Lone: Bangkal, Bel-Air, Carmona, Cembo, Comembo, Dasmariñas, East Rembo, Forbes Park, Guadalupe Nuevo, Guadalupe Viejo, Kasilawan, La Paz, Magallanes, Olympia, Palanan, Pembo, Pinagkaisahan, Pitogo, Pio del Pilar, Poblacion, Post Proper Northside, Post Proper Southside, Rizal, San Antonio, San Isidro, South Cembo, San Lorenzo, Santa Cruz, Singkamas, Tejeros, Urdaneta, Valenzuela, West Rembo	Makati
1998–2024		Makati
1998–2024	1st: Bangkal, Bel-Air, Carmona, Dasmariñas, Forbes Park, Kasilawan, La Paz, Magallanes, Olympia, Palanan, Pio del Pilar, Poblacion, San Antonio, San Isidro, San Lorenzo, Santa Cruz, Singkamas, Tejeros, Urdaneta, Valenzuela	Makati
1998–2024	2nd: Cembo, Comembo, East Rembo, Guadalupe Nuevo, Guadalupe Viejo, Pembo, Pinagkaisahan, Pitogo, Post Proper Northside, Post Proper Southside, Rizal, South Cembo, West Rembo	Makati
2024–present		Makati
2024–present	1st: Bangkal, Bel-Air, Carmona, Dasmariñas, Forbes Park, Kasilawan, La Paz, Magallanes, Olympia, Palanan, Pio del Pilar, Poblacion, San Antonio, San Isidro, San Lorenzo, Santa Cruz, Singkamas, Tejeros, Urdaneta, Valenzuela	Makati
2024–present	2nd: Guadalupe Nuevo, Guadalupe Viejo, Pinagkaisahan	Makati

== Current districts and representatives ==
The city was last redistricted in 1998, wherein the city gained a second seat in the House of Representatives.

Political parties

Makatizens United Party (2)

Legislative districts and congressional representatives of Makati City
District	Current representative	Barangays	Population (2020)	Area	Map
1st	Monique Lagdameo (since 2025); Forbes Park	List: Bangkal; Bel-Air; Carmona; Dasmariñas; Forbes Park; Kasilawan; La Paz; Magallanes; Olympia; Palanan; Pio del Pilar; Poblacion; San Antonio; San Isidro; San Lorenzo; Santa Cruz; Singkamas; Tejeros; Urdaneta; Valenzuela	254,600	16.31 km^{2}	
2nd	Dennis Almario (since 2025); Guadalupe Viejo	List: Guadalupe Nuevo; Guadalupe Viejo; Pinagkaisahan	38,143	0.78 km^{2}	
