= United Nationalist Alliance =

Political alliance (2013), and party (since 2015) in the Philippines

- President: Jejomar Binay
- Chairman: Nancy Binay
- Secretary-General: JV Bautista
- Founder: Jejomar Binay; Joseph Estrada
- Founded: April 4, 2012 (electoral alliance); July 1, 2015 (political party)
- Preceded by: United Opposition
- Headquarters: Room 103, G/F ECJ Building, Real cor. Arzobispo Streets, Intramuros, Manila
- Ideology: Populism
- Political position: Center-right
- Coalition members (2013): PDP–Laban (Binay faction); NPC (Maceda faction); PMP
- Colors: Orange and Navy blue
- Slogan: UNA ang Pilipino (Filipinos first)
- Senate: 0 / 24
- House of Representatives: 0 / 318
- Provincial Governors: 0 / 82
- Provincial Vice Governors: 0 / 82
- Provincial Board members: 0 / 840

The United Nationalist Alliance (UNA [ʊna]) is a political party in the Philippines. It was created as a multi-party electoral alliance replacing the former United Opposition (UNO) coalition for the 2013 midterm elections, before it was launched as a single political party on July 1, 2015, by Jejomar Binay for his candidacy in the 2016 presidential election.

The acronym "UNA" spells out the Filipino-Spanish word for "first".

== History ==
=== Formation, 2013 elections (2012–2015) ===
The Pwersa ng Masang Pilipino (PMP), headed by former president Joseph Estrada, and the Partido Demokratiko Pilipino–Lakas ng Bayan (PDP–Laban), headed by Vice President Jejomar Binay, signed a coalition agreement on April 4, 2012, for the 2013 elections, forming the United Nationalist Alliance (UNA). The two parties had been partners in the United Opposition in the 2007 election, and Estrada and Binay were running mates during the 2010 presidential election. Aquilino "Koko" Pimentel III, PDP–Laban president, has stated that the UNA's senatorial slate is now more than twelve members and is being trimmed down; he had also expressed reservations on the inclusion of Migz Zubiri, of whom he had won an election protest after the 2007 election. In March 2014, Binay resigned as Chairman of PDP–Laban, as a result the PMP party was the only primary party of UNA banner.

=== Binay's presidential bid (2015–2016) ===
On July 1, 2015, Binay relaunched the United Nationalist Alliance as the major opposition party at the Makati Coliseum in Makati days after he resigned from the Cabinet of President Noynoy Aquino, despite the absence of Manila Mayor Joseph Estrada which become neutral due to Senator Grace Poe possible presidential bid. Sarangani Rep. Manny Pacquiao, was touted a possible running mate, but being 36 years old at that time, he was barred by the Philippine constitution's age requirement of 40 years. Senator Bongbong Marcos was then considered to be his running mate before settling with Senator Gregorio Honasan, who is also the party's vice president.

=== 2019: Binay vs Binay in Makati ===
In April 2018, Nancy Binay took leave of absence as party president due to family conflict in the 2019 elections for Makati mayorship, as she will support former Mayor Junjun Binay, who is running for mayor with a temporary alliance named UNA ang Makati (Makati First). By September 2018, Nancy became the UNA party president. In the local elections, Junjun Binay faced his sister incumbent Mayor Abby Binay, who stayed under the UNA banner, which includes their father as a congressional candidate, with the latter became victorious, while their father lost re-election. Nancy also retained her Senate seat.

=== 2022 ===
Party leader Jejomar Binay attempted to run for Senate elections in 2022 under the slate of Panfilo Lacson, but lost. Due to infighting between former Marikina Mayor ahe nd Congressman Bayani Fernando and incumbent Mayor Marcy Teodoro inside of Nationalist People's Coalition (NPC) that resulted the latter's ouster, Teodoro and his allies migrated to UNA.

=== 2025 ===
Nancy Binay ran as UNA's mayoral candidate in Makati, with the support of UNA founder Jejomar Binay. She tapped former Makati Congressman and actor Monsour del Rosario as running mate. Nancy Binay managed to snap a victory, but del Rosario lost to 1st District Representative Kid Peña. The slate also occupied 7 seats in the city council. In the congressional elections, Bong Suntay of Quezon City emerged victorious with a slight margin of winning.

== Coalition members ==
=== Former affiliated national parties ===
Party	Abbr.	Date joined	Notes	Ref.
Partido Demokratiko Pilipino–Lakas ng Bayan; Philippine Democratic Party	PDP–Laban	2012 – March 7, 2014		
Pwersa ng Masang Pilipino; Force of the Filipino Masses	PMP	2012 – 2015	Joseph Estrada wing only	
Nationalist People's Coalition	NPC	until 2015	Mark Cojuangco wing only	
Nacionalista Party	Nacionalista	until 2015	minor wing	
Lakas–CMD	Lakas	until 2014		

=== Former affiliated local parties ===
- Asenso Manileño (Progress for Manilans) – Manila (switched allegiance to National Unity Party)
- One Cebu (2016) (switched allegiance to PDP–Laban)
- Padayon Pilipino (Filipinos Ahead) – Misamis Oriental and Cagayan de Oro
- Partido Magdiwang (Magdiwang Party) – San Juan (switched allegiance to PDP–Laban)
- Partido Navoteño (Party of the People of Navotas) – Navotas
- People's Champ Movement – Sarangani
- Team Casimiro – Las Piñas
- Timpuyog ti Baguio (Baguio Alliance) – Baguio
- Timawa – Iloilo City
- Padayon Pilipino (PDP) – Cagayan de Oro
- Ugyon Kita Capiz (UK CAPIZ) – Capiz
- Abyan Ilonggo – Iloilo
- Bukidnon Paglaum Party (BPP) – Bukidnon
- Alliance of Parties for Progress – Zamboanga del Norte
- Biskeg – Pangasinan
- Bagong Lakas ng Nueva Ecija (BALANE) – Nueva Ecija
- KAMBILAN – Pampanga
- Partido Magdalo – Cavite (switched allegiance to PDP-Laban)
- Team Crisologo (formerly Team Un1ty) – Quezon City (District 1)
- Dr. Lito Roxas: Team Dr. Roxas – Pasay
- Makatizens United Party – Makati (switched allegiance to Nationalist People's Coalition)

Despite the similarity in names, the local party United Negros Alliance from Negros Occidental is not related nor affiliated to the party.

== Senatorial candidates ==
On May 3, 2012, Zubiri took an oath to become a member of the PMP; Estrada and Binay were optimistic that Pimentel and Zubiri will be able to reconcile their differences prior to the start of the campaign.

On May 10, 2012, UNA announced its first five senatorial candidates: re-electionist Sens. Aquilino Pimentel III and Gregorio Honasan, Representatives Jack Enrile and JV Ejercito, and 2010 senatorial candidate Joey de Venecia.

On June 11, 2012, UNA formally included Zubiri in its line-up, together with Cebu Governor Gwendolyn Garcia and Zambales Representative Mitos Magsaysay. On June 28, 2012, Pimentel officially declined his spot in the UNA line-up, citing Zubiri's continued inclusion in it.

The UNA announced on August that former senators Dick Gordon and Ernesto Maceda were a part of their ticket, and that Senator Loren Legarda would be one of the last three candidates yet to be named in their ticket. UNA spokesperson JV Bautista also said that Pimentel has taken a leave of absence as PDP–Laban's presidency, and that PDP–Laban will not be in Pimentel's certificate of nomination as the latter is running under the Liberal Party. However, Pimentel denied that he took a leave of absence from the PDP–Laban presidency.

On the first day of filing of certificates of candidacies, senatorial nominees of UNA filed theirs at the Commission on Elections national offices at Intramuros. Joey de Venecia withdrew from the election as he cited his business endeavors as reasons for his withdrawal; speculation was rife when Lorenzo Tañada III was one of the persons considered to fill in de Venecia's slot in the ticket, but Binay disclosed that Tañada was not in their choices "any more." On October 4, UNA announced that Binay's daughter Nancy was their 12th nominee.

On February 21, 2013, UNA dropped Chiz Escudero, Loren Legarda and Grace Poe from their senatorial slate as a result of their non-attendance in their political rallies.

=== 2013 election ===
Candidate	Party	Last position in government	Relatives in government	Elected
Nancy Binay	UNA	No relevant political background	Vice President Jejomar Binay (father), Makati mayor Elenita Binay (mother), Makati mayor Jun–Jun Binay (brother), congresswoman from Makati Abigail Binay (sister)	Yes
Tingting Cojuangco	UNA	former governor of Tarlac (1992–1998)	Congressman from Tarlac Jose Cojuangco Jr. (husband), congressman from Tarlac Eduardo Cojuangco Jr. (cousin), President Benigno Aquino III (nephew), National Youth Commission chairman Bam Aquino (nephew), former Senator Robert Jaworski (brother-in-law), former Pasig Rep. Robert Jaworski Jr. (son-in-law)	Yes
JV Ejercito	UNA	Incumbent congressman from San Juan's lone district (since 2010)	President Joseph Estrada (father), San Juan mayor Guia Gomez (mother), Senator Jinggoy Estrada (half-brother), Laguna Governor ER Ejercito (cousin)	Yes
Jack Enrile	NPC	Incumbent congressman from Cagayan's 1st district (since 2010)	Senate President Juan Ponce Enrile (father), congresswoman from Cagayan Sally Ponce Enrile (wife)	Yes
Dick Gordon	UNA	former senator (2004–2010)	Olongapo mayor Katherine K. Gordon (wife), Olongapo councilor John Carlos de los Reyes (nephew)	Yes
Gregorio Honasan	UNA	Incumbent senator (since 2007)	None	Yes
Ernesto Maceda	UNA	former senator (1971–1972; 1987–1998)	Manila 4th district councilor Edward VP Maceda (son)	Yes
Mitos Magsaysay	UNA	Incumbent congresswoman from Zambales' 1st district (since 2004)	Senator Ramon Magsaysay Jr. (uncle-in-law), Zambales governor Vic Magsaysay (father-in-law)	Yes
Juan Miguel Zubiri	UNA	former senator (2007–2011)	Bukidnon vice-governor Jose Ma. R. Zubiri Jr. (father), congressman from Bukidnon Jose Zubiri III (brother)	Yes

=== 2016 election ===
President: Jejomar Binay (Lost)
Vice-president: Gregorio Honasan (Lost)
Senate Candidates:

- Jacel Kiram (Lost)
- Alma Moreno Lacsamana (Lost)
- Rey Langit (Lost)
- Allan Montaño (Lost)
- Getulio Napeñas (Lost)
- Manny Pacquiao (Won)

=== 2019 election ===
- Nancy Binay (Won)
- Dan Roleda (Lost)

=== 2022 election ===
- Jejomar Binay (Lost)

== Electoral performance ==
=== Presidential and vice presidential elections ===
Year	Presidential election			Vice presidential election		
Year	Candidate	Vote share	Result	Candidate	Vote share	Result
2016	Jejomar Binay	12.73%	Rodrigo Duterte (PDP–Laban)	Gregorio Honasan	1.92%	Leni Robredo (Liberal)
2022	None		Bongbong Marcos (PFP)	None		Sara Duterte (Lakas–CMD)

=== Legislative elections ===
Congress of the Philippines
House of Representatives			Senate			
Year	Seats won	Result	Year	Seats won	Ticket	Result
2013	8 / 293	Liberal plurality	2013	3 / 12	United Nationalist Alliance	Team PNoy win 9/12 seats
2016	11 / 297	Liberal plurality	2016	1 / 12	Single party ticket	Daang Matuwid win 7/12 seats
2019	0 / 304	PDP–Laban plurality	2019	1 / 12	Single party ticket	Hugpong win 9/12 seats
2022	1 / 316	PDP–Laban plurality	2022	0 / 12	Single party ticket	UniTeam win 6/12 seats
2025	1 / 317	Lakas plurality	2025	Did not contest		Bagong Pilipinas win 6/12 seats

== Slogans ==
- Sa UNA, gaganda ang buhay (2013–2015)
- UNA ang Pilipino (2015–present)

== See also ==
- Genuine Opposition
- Koalisyon ng Nagkakaisang Pilipino
- Laban ng Makabayang Masang Pilipino
- Puwersa ng Masa
- Team PNoy
- Koalisyon ng Daang Matuwid
- Partido Galing at Puso
