= 2016 Makati local elections =

8th City elections in Makati

2016 Makati mayoral election
- May 9, 2016
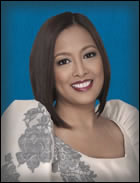

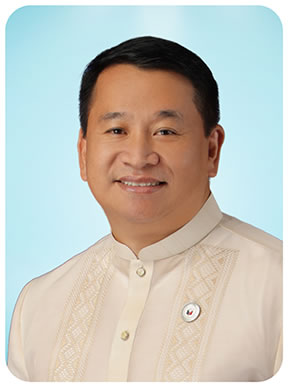

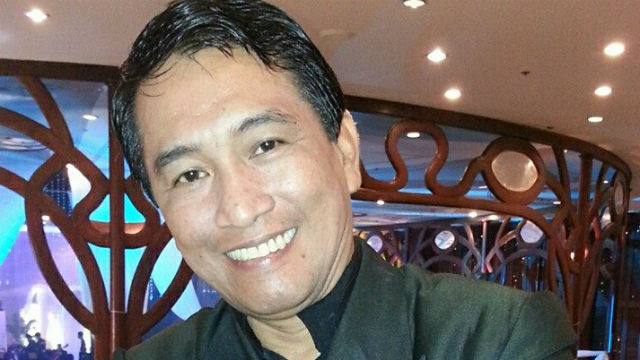
| Nominee | Abigail Binay | Romulo Peña Jr. | Jimboy "Jimmy" Jumawan |
| Party | UNA | Liberal | Partido Bagong Maharlika |
| Alliance | Team Performance | Tropang Kid: Bagong Makati | Team Jimmy Jumawan |
| Running mate | Monique Lagdameo | Karla Mercado | Edgardo Padrigon |
| Popular vote | 160,320 | 142,257 | 1,823 |
| Percentage | 52.66% | 46.73% | 0.61% |
Mayor before election
Romulo Peña Jr.
Liberal
Elected mayor
Abigail Binay
UNA

Vice mayoral election
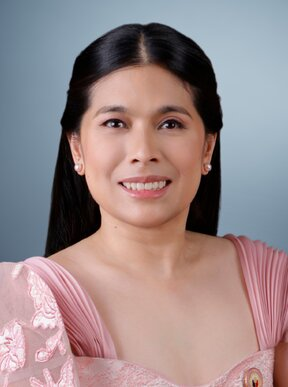
| Candidate | Monique Lagdameo | Karla Mercado | Glenn C. Enciso |
| Party | UNA | Liberal | Independent |
| Alliance | Team Performance | Tropang Kid: Bagong Makati | Team Pagbabago 2016 |
| Popular vote | 172,950 | 107,488 | 5,271 |
| Percentage | 60.12% | 37.37% | 1.83% |
| Candidate | Edgardo Padrigon |
| Party | Partido Bagong Maharlika |
| Alliance | Team Jimmy Jumawan |
| Popular vote | 1,948 |
| Percentage | 0.68% |
Vice Mayor before election
Leonardo Magpantay
Liberal
Elected Vice Mayor
Monique Lagdameo
UNA

Local elections were held in Makati on May 9, 2016, within the Philippine general election. The voters elected for the elective local posts in the city: the mayor, vice mayor, the two Congressmen, and the eight councilors, eight in each of the city's two legislative districts.

== Background ==
Acting Mayor Kid Peña ran for the mayoral position against a "still to be determined" mayoralty bet from the United Nationalist Alliance. That "still to be determined" candidate turned out to be outgoing 2nd District Representative Abby Binay-Campos, who replaced her brother Junjun. Junjun Binay was disqualified for running by the Ombudsman due to the overpriced Makati City Hall II Parking building anomaly.

Aside from Peña and Binay, theater and stage play director Jimboy "Jimmy" Jumawan is reportedly running for Mayor under the banner of Partido Bagong Maharlika party.

In the vice mayoralty election, Makati 1st District Representative Monique Lagdameo of UNA and Karla Mercado of the Liberal Party, the daughter of former Makati vice mayor and primary witness of Binay's corruption cases, Ernesto S. Mercado, declared their candidacies for Vice Mayor. Lagdameo and Mercado will also face PBM's Edgardo Padrigon and Glenn Enciso for the vice mayoralty race. Incumbent Acting Vice Mayor Leonardo Magpantay ran for councilor from the 2nd district instead of seeking re-election, attempting a comeback to the post he previously held.

On March 18, Binay, Jumawan and Peña signed a peace covenant, pledging for a secured and peaceful elections in Makati, the peace covenant signing happened in a pre-campaign period event organized by COMELEC, PNP and PPCRV at the University of Makati grounds.

=== Campaign ===
Binay and Peña started their campaigns on March 28, 2016, 2 days after the start of the local candidates' campaign period. Incumbent mayor, Kid Peña held his proclamation rally, together with his running mate, Karla Mercado, at the Plaza Lawton to jump-start his campaign dubbed as "Bagong Makati" (The New Makati). He stated that the major supporters and former allies of the Binay family are backing out their support to the Binays, and they are campaigning for Peña's candidacy.

Binay formally started their campaign at the intersection of Metropolitan Avenue, Pasong Tamo and P. Ocampo Extension. Jejomar Binay, Abby's father and presidential candidate for the United Nationalist Alliance, and his running mate Gregorio Honasan were present in the rally. Abby Binay said after the rally that her surname is a "blessing" and a "curse", despite being part of a political dynasty.

Her brother, Junjun Binay, was affected by the corruption issues faced him by his critics and enemies, and he criticized Peña's performance as mayor of Makati. He also criticized Pena's affiliated party, the Liberal Party for vote-buying.

== Candidates ==
=== Team Performance ===
United Nationalist Alliance/Team Performance
| Name | Party |
For Mayor
| Mar-Len Abigail "Abby" S. Binay-Campos | UNA |
For Vice Mayor
| Monique "Nik" Lagdameo | UNA |
For House Of Representative (1st District)
| Manuel Monsour T. del Rosario III | UNA |
For Councilor (1st District)
| Virgilio "Jhong" Hilario Jr. | UNA |
| Ferdinand Jacinto "Ferdie Tangol" T. Eusebio | UNA |
| Enrico "Rico J." Puno | UNA |
| Ma. Concepcion "Ichi" Yabut | UNA |
| Marie Alethea S. Casal-Uy | UNA |
| Romeo "Romy" C. Medina | UNA |
| Ma. Arlene Ortega | UNA |
| Luis "Jojo" S. Javier Jr. | UNA |
For House Of Representative (2nd District)
| Luis Campos Jr. | UNA |
For Councilor (2nd District)
| Nemesio "King" S. Yabut Jr. | UNA |
| Nelson "Doc" S. Pasia | UNA |
| Mary Ruth C. Tolentino | UNA |
| Divina A. Jacome | UNA |
| Evelyn Delfina "Bing" E. Villamor | UNA |
| Grazielle Iony N. de Lara-Bes | UNA |
| Jeline "Baby" M. Olfato | UNA |
| Arleen Pangilinan | UNA |

=== Tropang Kid: Bagong Makati ===
Liberal Party/Tropang Kid: Bagong Makati
| Name | Party |
For Mayor
| Romulo "Kid" Peña Jr. | Liberal |
For Vice Mayor
| Karla Mercado | Liberal |
For House Of Representative (1st District)
| Norman Nicholas "Nico" Garcia | Liberal |
For Councilor (1st District)
| Jose "Joey" C. Villena IV | Liberal |
| Virgilio "Battle" R. Batalla | Liberal |
| Mario "Buboy" D. Cruz Jr. | Liberal |
| Jessielin "Jessy" O. Trinidad | Liberal |
| Nilo "Bobbit" B. Lopez Jr. | Liberal |
| Raymond "Isko" E. Kahiwat | Liberal |
| Jocelyn "Chuh" Hernandez | Liberal |
| Victorio "Papa Vic" Umandap | Liberal |
For House Of Representative (2nd District)
| Israel "Boyet" S. Cruzado | Liberal |
For Councilor (2nd District)
| Leonardo "Leo" M. Magpantay | Liberal |
| Shirley "Aspi" C. Aspillaga | Liberal |
| Kristina "Ina" T. Sarosa | Liberal |
| Artemio "Art" A. Contreras II | Liberal |
| Judith Baquiran-Celos | Liberal |
| Jeffrey "Jeff" E. Baluyut | Liberal |
| Hilario "Larry" V. Lorico | Liberal |
| Efren T. Arenas | Liberal |

=== Team Jimmy Jumawan ===
Partido Bagong Maharlika/Team Jimmy Jumawan
| Name | Party |
For Mayor
| Jimboy "Jimmy" Jumawan | Partido Bagong Maharlika |
For Vice Mayor
| Edgardo Padrigon | Partido Bagong Maharlika |
For House Of Representative (1st District)
| Eugenia Carreon | Partido Bagong Maharlika |
For Councilor (1st District)
| Erlinda Gutierrez | Partido Bagong Maharlika |
| Restituto "Resty" Balane | Partido Bagong Maharlika |
| Roderick "Bunso" Leuterio | Partido Bagong Maharlika |
For House Of Representative (2nd District)
| Levi Perez | Partido Bagong Maharlika |
For Councilor (2nd District)
| Protacio Alba | Partido Bagong Maharlika |
| Jessica Talipan | Partido Bagong Maharlika |
| Arturo Ecleo | Partido Bagong Maharlika |

=== Team Pagbabago 2016 ===
Lakas-CMD/Nationalist People's Coalition/Partido Demokratiko Pilipino-Lakas ng Bayan/Team Pagbabago 2016
| Name | Party |
For Vice Mayor
| Glenn C. Enciso | Independent |
For House Of Representative (1st District)
| Wilfredo "Willy" M. Talag | NPC |
For Councilor (1st District)
| Raul "Oloy" S. Javier | Independent |
| Ricardo "Ric Nepo" C. Nepomuceno | Independent |
| Anthony V. Lichauco | Lakas |
| Francisco Dizon | Independent |
| Ruben C. Enciso | Lakas |
For Councilor (2nd District)
| Nemesio "Nessie" C. Alvior | PDP–Laban |
| Roberto "Bobby" G. Brillante Sr. | Lakas |
| Rommel Sorita | Independent |

=== Independent Candidates ===
Independent
| Name | Party |
For House of Representative (1st District)
| Lourdesiree Latimer | Independent |
For Councilor (1st District)
| George Corpuz | Independent |
| Razel Granada | Independent |
| Anthony Hernandez | Independent |
| Armando Nayve | Independent |
| Gerard Reyes | Independent |
| Jan Martti Gregonia | Independent |
| Carlos Tort Jr. | Independent |
For House of Representative (2nd District)
| Joel A. Sarza | Independent |
| Marvin "Vin" Porciuncula | Independent |

== Results ==
=== Representative ===
==== 1st District ====
Incumbent Rep. Monique Lagdameo decided not to seek re-election in order to run for Vice Mayor. Ichi Yabut was supposed to run under the United Nationalist Alliance, but declared that she will instead seek re-election for councilor. Actor and councilor Monsour del Rosario took her stead.

Monsour del Rosario won against four other candidates by a wide margin.

2016 Philippine House of Representatives election in Makati's 1st District
| Party | Candidate | Votes | % |
|---|---|---|---|
| UNA | Monsour del Rosario | 76,728 | 60.27 |
| Liberal | Norman Nicholas "Nico" Garcia | 38,377 | 30.14 |
| NPC | Wilfredo "Willy" Talag | 6,043 | 4.75 |
| Partido Bagong Maharlika | Eugenia Carreon | 3,580 | 2.81 |
| Independent | Lourdesiree Latimer | 2,584 | 2.03 |
| Total votes | | 127,312 | 100.00 |
| UNA hold | | | |

==== 2nd District ====
Incumbent representative Abigail Binay is term-limited; she will run as city mayor. Her husband, Luis Campos Jr. would run under her party, the United Nationalist Alliance, running against incumbent 2nd district councilor Israel "Boyet" Cruzado, as well as Levi Perez, and independent candidates Joel Sarza and Marvin Porciuncula.

Luis Campos Jr. won against Cruzado, Perez, Sarza and Porciuncula.

2016 Philippine House of Representatives election in Makati's 2nd District
| Party | Candidate | Votes | % |
|---|---|---|---|
| UNA | Luis Campos Jr. | 79,748 | 54.01 |
| Liberal | Israel "Boyet" Cruzado | 62,145 | 42.09 |
| Partido Bagong Maharlika | Levi Perez | 3,394 | 2.30 |
| Independent | Joel Sarza | 1,248 | 0.85 |
| Independent | Marvin "Vin" Porciuncula | 1,111 | 0.75 |
| Total votes | | 147,646 | 100.00 |
| UNA hold | | | |

=== Mayor ===
Incumbent 2nd district representative Abigail Binay won as mayor against incumbent mayor Romulo "Kid" Pena Jr. and Jimmy Jumawan.

Makati Mayoralty Election
| Party | Candidate | Votes | % |
|---|---|---|---|
| UNA | Abigail Binay | 160,320 | 52.66 |
| Liberal | Kid Peña | 142,257 | 46.73 |
| PBM | Jimmy "Jimboy" Jumawan | 1,823 | 0.61 |
| Total votes | | 304,400 | 100.00 |
| UNA gain from Liberal | | | |

=== Vice Mayor ===
Incumbent 1st district representative Monique Lagdameo won as vice mayor against three other candidates.

Makati Vice Mayoralty Election
| Party | Candidate | Votes | % |
|---|---|---|---|
| UNA | Monique Lagdameo | 172,950 | 60.12 |
| Liberal | Karla Mercado | 107,488 | 37.37 |
| Independent | Glenn Enciso | 5,271 | 1.83 |
| PBM | Edgardo Padrigon | 1,948 | 0.68 |
| Total votes | | 287,657 | 100.00 |
| UNA gain from Liberal | | | |

=== Councilors ===
==== 1st District ====
All candidates of Team Performance won in this district.

Makati City Council Election – 1st District
| Party | Candidate | Votes | % |
|---|---|---|---|
| UNA | Virgilio "Jhong" Hilario Jr. | 80,692 | |
| UNA | Ferdinand Jacinto "Ferdie Tangol" T. Eusebio | 68,689 | |
| UNA | Enrico "Rico J." Puno | 65,674 | |
| UNA | Ma. Concepcion "Ichi" M. Yabut | 65,081 | |
| UNA | Marie Alethea "Mayeth" S. Casal-Uy | 62,299 | |
| UNA | Romeo "Romy" C. Medina | 61,271 | |
| UNA | Ma. Arlene M. Ortega | 57,659 | |
| UNA | Luis "Jojo" S. Javier Jr. | 54,653 | |
| Liberal | Jose "Joey" C. Villena IV | 53,015 | |
| Liberal | Virgilio "Battle" R. Batalla | 46,790 | |
| Liberal | Jessielin "Jessy" O. Trinidad | 45,642 | |
| Liberal | Mario "Buboy" D. Cruz Jr. | 44,585 | |
| Liberal | Nilo "Bobbit" B. Lopez Jr. | 44,217 | |
| Liberal | Raymond "Isko" E. Kahiwat | 35,632 | |
| Liberal | Jocelyn "Chuh" Hernandez | 35,462 | |
| Liberal | Victorio "Papa Vic" Umandap | 30,994 | |
| Independent | Raul "Oloy" S. Javier | 13,269 | |
| Independent | Ricardo "Ric Nepo" C. Nepomuceno | 11,070 | |
| Lakas | Anthony V. Lichauco | 9,355 | |
| Independent | Francisco Dizon | 7,987 | |
| Partido Bagong Maharlika | Erlinda "Linda" Gutierrez | 7,250 | |
| Lakas | Ruben C. Enciso | 6,681 | |
| Independent | George Corpuz | 6,046 | |
| Independent | Razel Granada | 5,733 | |
| Independent | Anthony "Ton" Hernandez | 5,695 | |
| Independent | Armando Nayve | 5,648 | |
| Independent | Gerard Reyes | 5,507 | |
| Partido Bagong Maharlika | Restituto "Resty" Balane | 5,358 | |
| Partido Bagong Maharlika | Roderick "Bunso" Leuterio | 4,398 | |
| Independent | Jan Martti Gregonia | 3,906 | |
| Independent | Carlos Tort, Jr. | 3,587 | |
| Total votes | | | |

==== 2nd District ====
Six of eight candidates of Team Performance won in this district. Two candidates of Tropang Kid: Bagong Makati won the two remaining seats.

Makati City Council Election – 2nd District
| Party | Candidate | Votes | % |
|---|---|---|---|
| UNA | Nemesio "King" S. Yabut, Jr. | 84,741 | |
| UNA | Nelson "Doc" S. Pasia | 82,512 | |
| Liberal | Leonardo "Leo" M. Magpantay | 81,094 | |
| UNA | Mary Ruth C. Tolentino | 77,709 | |
| UNA | Divina "Divine" A. Jacome | 77,144 | |
| UNA | Evelyn Delfina "Bing" E. Villamor | 71,950 | |
| UNA | Grazielle Iony N. De Lara-Bes | 70,460 | |
| Liberal | Shirley "Aspi" C. Aspillaga | 70,409 | |
| UNA | Jeline "Baby" M. Olfato | 62,953 | |
| Liberal | Kristina "Ina" T. Sarosa | 54,764 | |
| UNA | Arleen Pangilinan | 54,353 | |
| Liberal | Artemio "Art" A. Contreras II | 50,987 | |
| Liberal | Judith Baquiran-Celos | 45,679 | |
| Liberal | Jeffrey "Jeff" E. Baluyut | 44,652 | |
| Liberal | Hilario "Larry" V. Lorico | 44,520 | |
| Liberal | Efren T. Arenas | 44,228 | |
| PDP–Laban | Nemesio "Nessie" C. Alvior | 24,477 | |
| Lakas | Roberto "Bobby" G. Brillante Sr. | 20,626 | |
| Partido Bagong Maharlika | Protacio Alba | 6,397 | |
| Partido Bagong Maharlika | Jessica Talipan | 5,637 | |
| Partido Bagong Maharlika | Arturo Ecleo | 4,961 | |
| Independent | Rommel Sorita | 4,783 | |
| Total votes | | | |
