= Fight for Justice =

Fight for Justice may refer to:

- Fight for Justice, a Taiwanese drama broadcast on Sanlih E-Television
- A Fight for Justice, a Taiwanese drama, starring Kaiser Chuang, Mini Tsai and Brando Huang, etc., broadcast on PTS Taigi
- The Trigonal: Fight for Justice, a Philippine action film starring Rhian Ramos, Epy Quizon and Monsour Del Rosario
- Vairam: Fight for Justice, a 2009 Malayalam film starring Pasupathy, Jayasurya, Mukesh, Samvrutha Sunil, and Dhanya Mary Varghese

== See also ==
- Fighting for Justice, a 1932 American Western film
