= 2013 Makati local elections =

7th City elections in Makati

2013 Makati mayoral election
- May 13, 2013
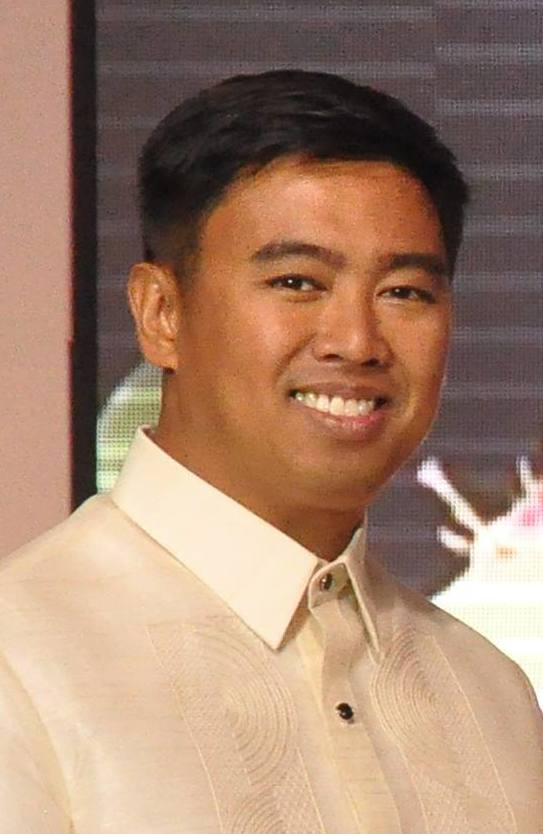

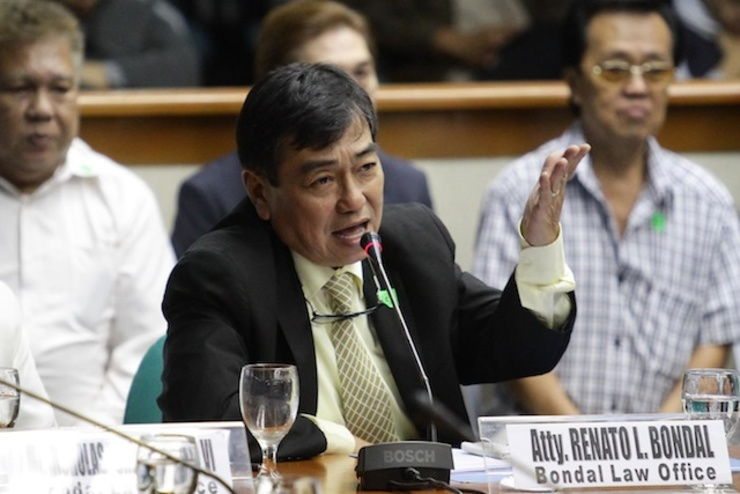
Nominee	Junjun Binay	Rene Bondal
Party	UNA	Independent
Alliance	Team Binay	Team Kid
Running mate	Marjorie De Veyra	Romulo Peña Jr.
Popular vote	208,748	25,791
Percentage	83.06	10.26
Mayor before election
Junjun Binay
UNA
Elected mayor
Junjun Binay
UNA
- Vice mayoral election
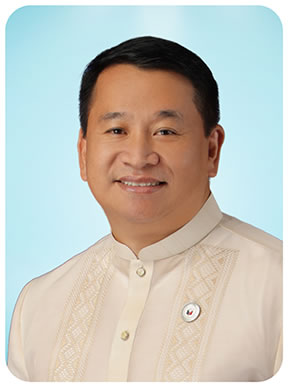

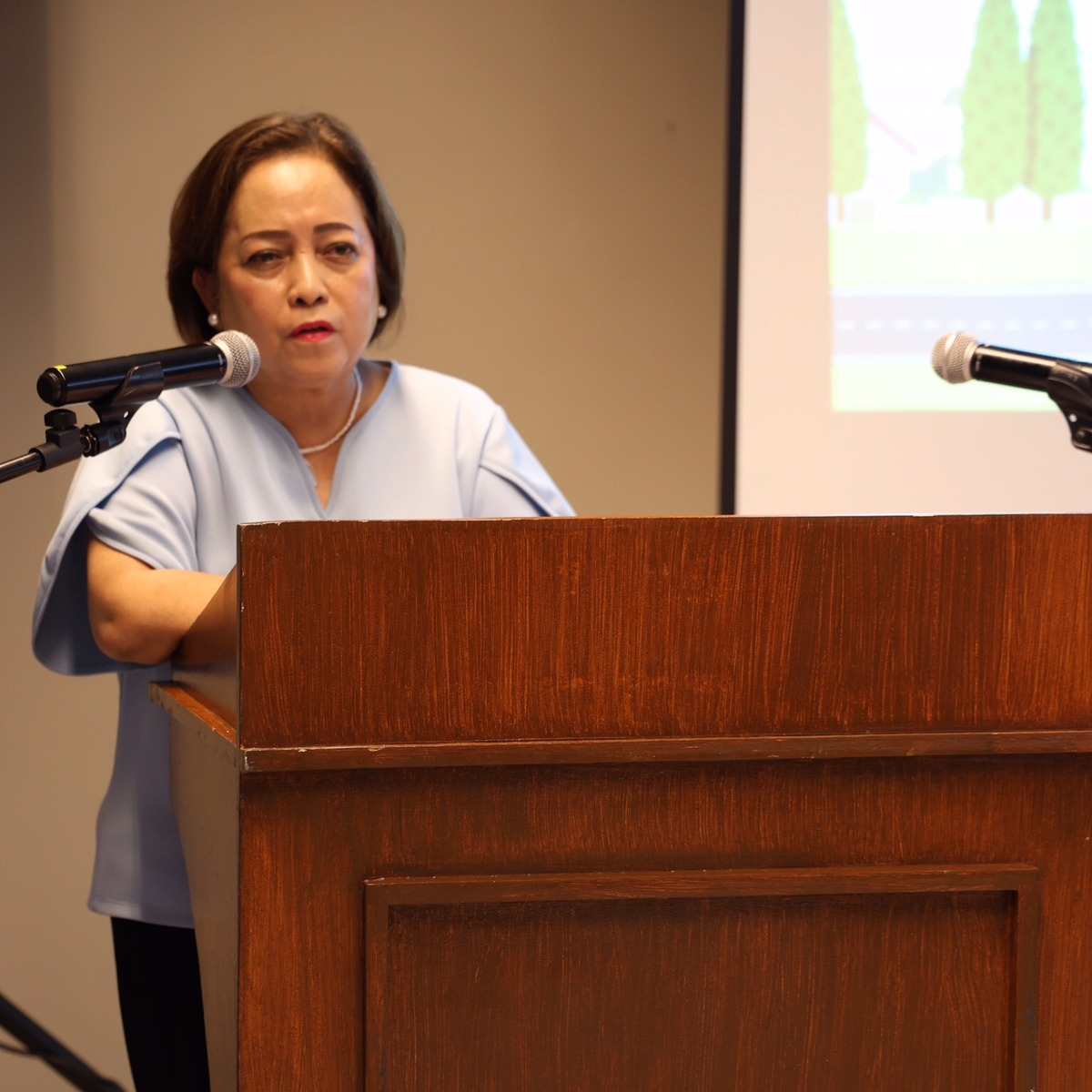
Candidate	Romulo Peña Jr.	Marge De Veyra
Party	Liberal	UNA
Alliance	Team Kid	Team Binay
Popular vote	120,893	113,815
Percentage	48.10%	45.29%
Vice Mayor before election
Romulo Peña Jr.
Liberal
Elected Vice Mayor
Romulo Peña Jr.
Liberal

Local elections were held in Makati on May 13, 2013, within the Philippine general election. The voters elected for the elective local posts in the city: the mayor, vice mayor, the two congressmen, and the sixteen councilors, eight in each of the city's two legislative districts.

== Mayoral and vice mayoral election ==
Incumbent Mayor Jejomar Erwin "Junjun" Binay is running for his second term under United Nationalist Alliance. His running mate is former city administrator Marge De Veyra. His opponent for the mayoralty race is lawyer Renato "Rene" Bondal, an independent candidate whose running mate is incumbent Vice Mayor Romulo "Kid" Peña Jr.

== Congressional election ==
Incumbent 1st District Representative Monique Lagdameo won on 2010 election with a 0.19% margin over her closest rival, Maria Lourdes Locsin, wife of former Rep. Teodoro Locsin Jr. This year, she is running for her reelection under UNA, facing Edilberto Cuenca (Ang Kapatiran), Virgilio "Battle" Batalla, and Miguel Lopez, Jr., both independent candidates.

Incumbent 2nd District Representative Abigail Binay is running for reelection. Her opponent is Joel Sarza, who is running as an independent.

== Candidates ==
=== Administration coalition ===
United Nationalist Alliance/Team Binay
Name	Party
For Mayor
Jejomar Erwin "Junjun" S. Binay Jr.	UNA
For Vice Mayor
Marjorie "Marge" De Veyra	UNA
For House Of Representative (1st District)
Monique "Nik" Lagdameo	UNA
For Councilor (1st District)
Marie Alethea "Mayeth" S. Casal-Uy	UNA
Manuel Monsour T. del Rosario III	UNA
Ferdinand Jacinto "Ferdie Tangol" T. Eusebio	UNA
Ma. Concepcion "Ichi" Yabut	UNA
Virgilio "VirJhong" V. Hilario, Sr.	UNA
Arnold "Idol" C. Magpantay	UNA
Romeo "Romy" C. Medina	UNA
Tosca Camille T. Puno-Ramos	UNA
For House Of Representative (2nd District)
Mar-Len Abigail "Abby" S. Binay-Campos	UNA
For Councilor (2nd District)
Israel "Boyet" S. Cruzado	UNA
Ma. Theresa "Tetchie" Nillo-de Lara	UNA
Henry A. Jacome	UNA
Leonardo "Leo" M. Magpantay	UNA
Nelson "Doc" S. Pasia	UNA
Vincent T. Sese	UNA
Mary Ruth C. Tolentino	UNA
Nemesio "King" S. Yabut Jr.	UNA

=== Opposition coalition ===
Liberal Party/Team Kid
Name	Party
For Mayor
Renato "Rene" L. Bondal	Independent
For Vice Mayor
Romulo "Kid" Peña Jr.	Liberal
For Councilor (1st District)
Arthur C. Cruto	Liberal
Glenn C. Enciso	Liberal
Raymond "Isko" E. Kahiwat	Independent
For Councilor (2nd District)
Efren T. Arenas	Liberal
Ernesto "Aspi" A. Aspillaga	Liberal
Pedro "Jun" L. Opoc Jr.	Liberal

=== Independent Candidates ===
Independent
Name	Party
For House of Representative (1st District)
Virgilio "Battle" R. Batalla	Independent
Miguel Lopez Jr.	Independent
For Councilor (1st District)
Leandro Augustine "Drew" P. Nadal	Independent
Jessielin "Jessy" O. Trinidad	Independent
Anthony V. Lichauco	Independent
Launcelot M. Beltran	Independent
Perfecto "Bambi" M. Santos	Independent
Donato C. Teodoro	Independent
Donato B. Peregrina	Independent
For House of Representative (2nd District)
Joel A. Sarza	Independent
For Councilor (2nd District)
Roberto "Jun" C. Brillante Jr.	Independent
Antonio G. Manalili	Independent
Mariano S. Cruz	Independent
Nemesio B. Beare	Independent

=== Other Non-Independent Candidates ===
Ang Kapatiran
For House of Representative (1st District)
Ediberto M. Cuenca	Ang Kapatiran

Centrist Democratic Party of the Philippines
For Councilor (2nd District)
Nenita S. Manongsong	CDP

== Results ==
=== Mayoral election ===
Incumbent Mayor Junjun Binay defeated lawyer Rene Bondal in a landslide.

2013 Makati mayoral election
Party	Candidate	Votes	%
UNA	Junjun Binay (incumbent)	208,748	83.06
Independent	Renato "Rene" Bondal	25,791	10.26
Invalid or blank votes		16,791	6.68
Total votes		251,330	100.00
UNA hold			

=== Vice-mayoral election ===
Incumbent Vice Mayor Kid Peña narrowly defeated former city administrator Marge de Veyra.

2013 Makati vice-mayoral election
Party	Candidate	Votes	%
Liberal	Kid Peña (incumbent)	120,893	48.10
UNA	Marjorie "Marge" De Veyra	113,815	45.29
Invalid or blank votes		16,622	6.61
Total votes		251,330	100.00
Liberal hold			

=== Congressional election ===
==== 1st District ====
Monique Lagdameo is the incumbent. She easily won reelection against three other candidates.

2013 Philippine House of Representatives election at Makati's 1st district
Party	Candidate	Votes	%
UNA	Monique Lagdameo (incumbent)	86,881	70.98
Independent	Virgilio "Battle" Batalla	8,249	6.74
Ang Kapatiran	Edilberto Cuenca	4,611	3.77
Independent	Miguel Lopez Jr.	3,182	2.60
Invalid or blank votes		19,476	15.91
Total votes		122,399	100.00
UNA hold			

==== 2nd District ====
Abigail Binay is the incumbent. She won against independent candidate Joel Sarza by a large margin.

2013 Philippine House of Representatives election at Makati's 2nd district
Party	Candidate	Votes	%
UNA	Abigail Binay (incumbent)	107,620	83.47
Independent	Joel Sarza	7,319	5.68
Invalid or blank votes		13,992	10.85
Total votes		128,931	100.00
UNA hold			

=== City Council Election ===
Each of Makati's two legislative districts elects eight councilors to the City Council. The eight candidates with the highest number of votes wins the seats per district.

Of the incumbent councilors elected in 2010, only one is not seeking re-election:

- Salvador Pangilinan, not running.

==== 1st District ====
All Team Binay candidates won in this district.

Makati City Council Election – 1st District
Party	Candidate	Votes	%
UNA	Virgilio "VirJhong" V. Hilario, Sr.	76,929	10.47
UNA	Ma. Concepcion "Ichi" M. Yabut	75,818	10.32
UNA	Manuel Monsour T. del Rosario III	75,796	10.32
UNA	Ferdinand Jacinto "Ferdie Tangol" T. Eusebio	73,722	10.03
UNA	Marie Alethea "Mayeth" S. Casal-Uy	70,391	9.58
UNA	Tosca Camille T. Puno-Ramos	69,781	9.50
UNA	Arnold "Idol" C. Magpantay	65,938	8.97
UNA	Romeo "Romy" C. Medina	64,380	8.76
Independent	Leandro Augustine "Drew" P. Nadal	33,860	4.61
Independent	Jessielin "Jessy" O. Trinidad	21,780	2.96
Liberal	Glenn C. Enciso	20,267	2.76
Liberal	Arthur C. Cruto	18,845	2.56
Independent	Anthony V. Lichauco	15,880	1.87
Independent	Raymond "Isko" E. Kahiwat	13,704	1.87
Independent	Launcelot M. Beltran	11,410	1.55
Independent	Perfecto "Bambi" M. Santos	11,166	1.52
Independent	Donato C. Teodoro	8,030	1.09
Independent	Donato B. Peregrina	7,091	0.97
Total votes		734,248	100.00

==== 2nd District ====
All Team Binay candidates won in this district.

Makati City Council Election – 2nd District
Party	Candidate	Votes	%
UNA	Leonardo "Leo" M. Magpantay	84,683	10.40
UNA	Nelson "Doc" S. Pasia	79,546	9.77
UNA	Vincent T. Sese	79,132	9.72
UNA	Israel "Boyet" S. Cruzado	78,838	9.68
UNA	Henry A. Jacome	77,356	9.50
UNA	Nemesio "King" S. Yabut Jr.	76,317	9.37
UNA	Ma. Theresa "Tetchie" Nillo-De Lara	73,365	9.01
UNA	Mary Ruth C. Tolentino	71,029	8.72
Liberal	Ernesto "Aspi" A. Aspillaga	65,901	8.09
Liberal	Efren T. Arenas	33,479	4.11
Liberal	Pedro "Jun" L. Opoc Jr.	29,639	3.64
Independent	Roberto "Jun" C. Brillante Jr.	23,190	2.85
Independent	Antonio "Tony" G. Manalili	14,880	1.83
Independent	Mariano S. Cruz	11,191	1.37
CDP	Nenita S. Manongsong	8,909	1.09
Independent	Nemesio "Manong" B. Beare	6,679	0.82
Total votes		814,134	100.00
