= 2019 Makati local elections =

9th City elections in Makati

2019 Makati mayoral election
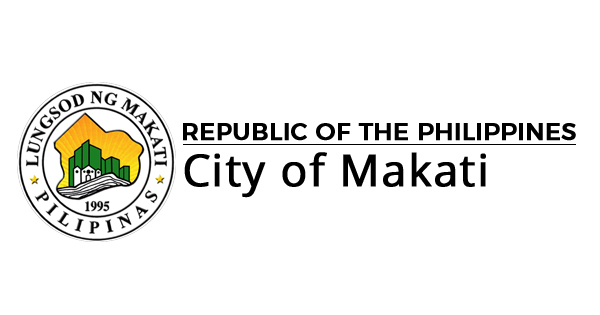
- May 13, 2019
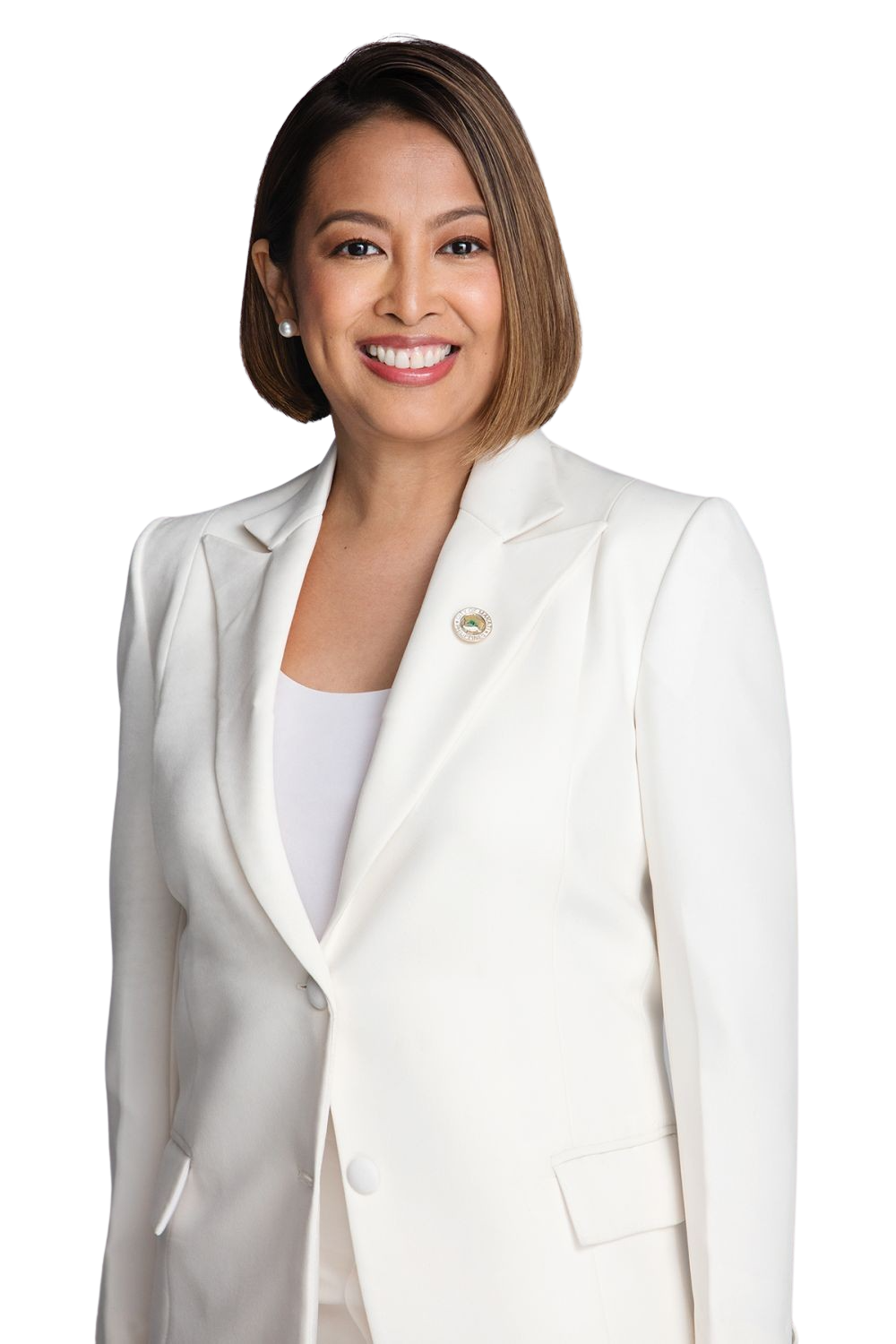

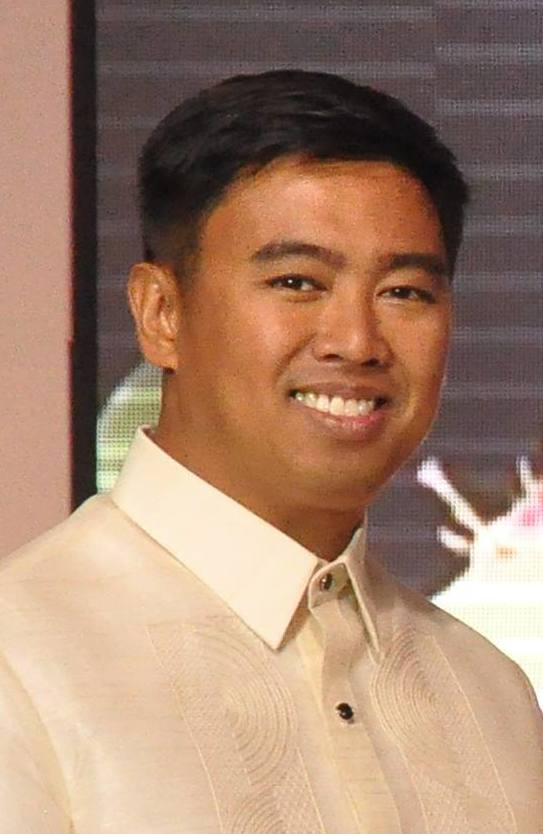

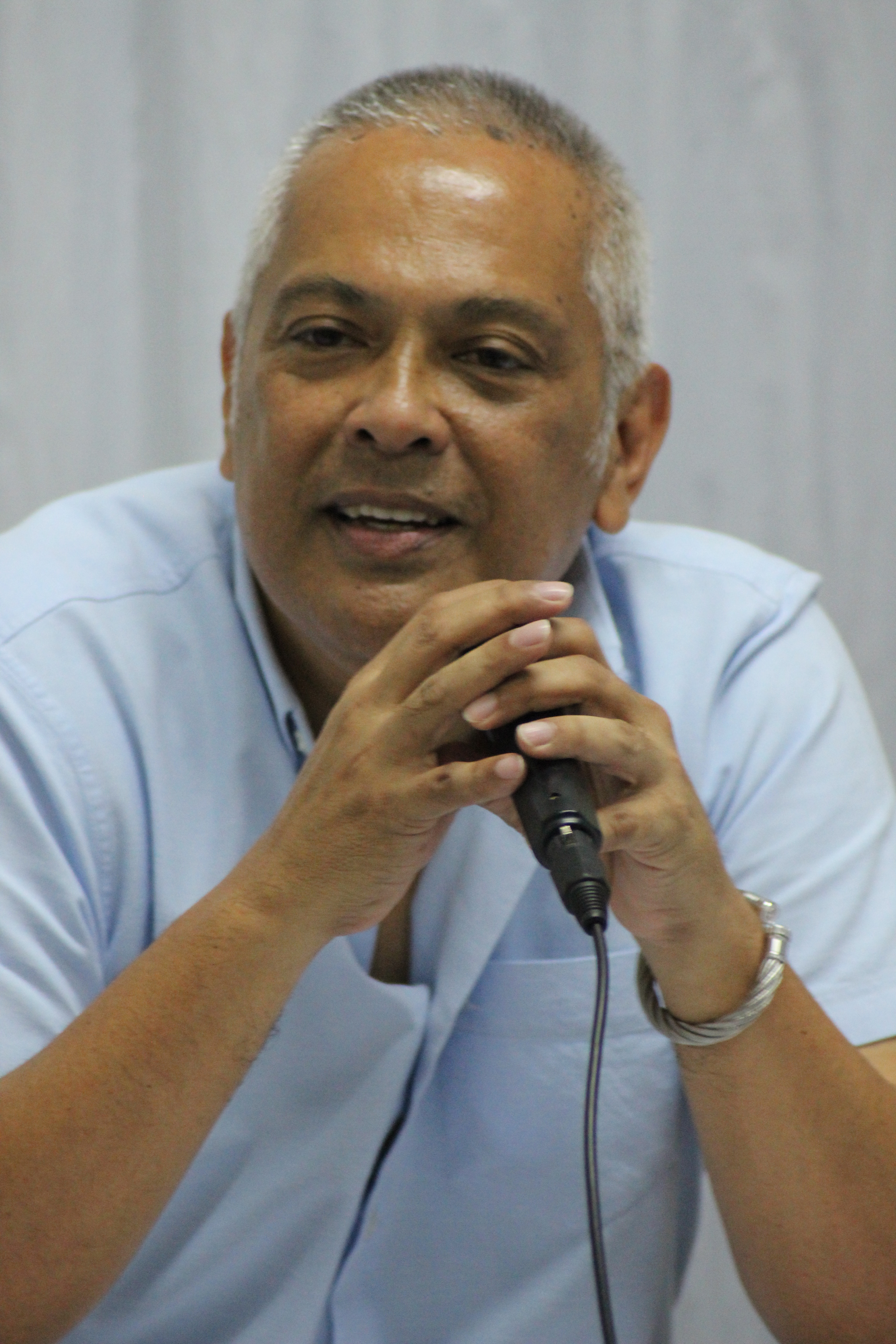

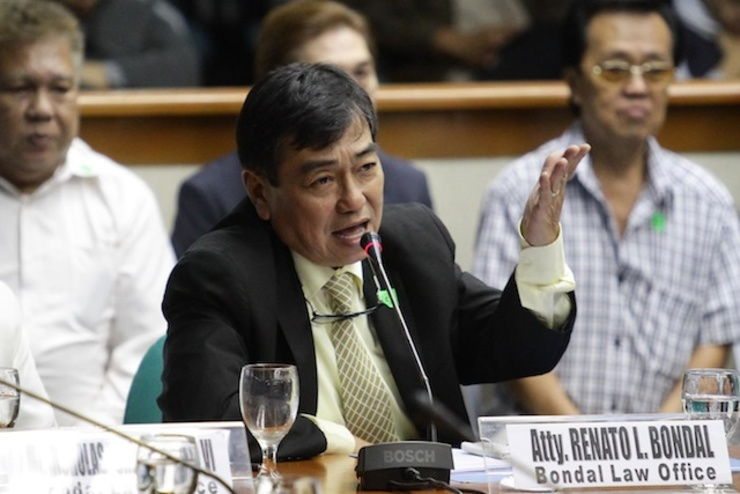
Nominee	Abigail Binay	Junjun Binay	Ricardo Yabut
Party	UNA	UAM	Bigkis
Alliance	Team Performance	Team Be Nice
Running mate	Monique Lagdameo	Monsour Del Rosario
Popular vote	179,522	98,653	23,721
Percentage	58.26%	32.01%	7.69%
Nominee	Renato Bondal	Wilfredo Talag	Carmelle Ainne Alanzalon
Party	Independent	PDP–Laban	Independent
Alliance	Team Rene-Battle	Team Pagbabago 2019
Running mate	Virgilio Batalla	Roberto Lantin
Popular vote	3,565	1,541	1,101
Percentage	1.15%	0.50%	0.35%
Mayor before election
Abigail Binay
UNA
Elected mayor
Abigail Binay
UNA

Vice mayoral election
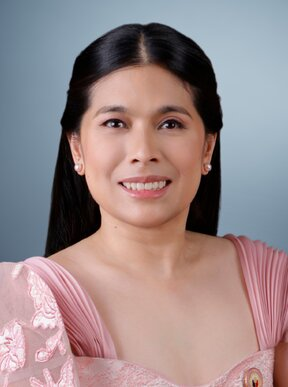

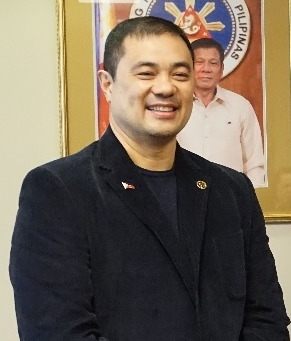
Candidate	Monique Lagdameo	Monsour del Rosario	Virgilio Batalla
Party	UNA	PDP–Laban	Independent
Alliance	Team Performance	Team Be Nice	Team Rene-Battle
Popular vote	182,655	105,153	7,522
Percentage	60.82%	35.01%	2.50%
Candidate	Roberto Lantin	Rodolfo Biolena
Party	Independent	Independent
Alliance	Team Pagbabago 2019
Popular vote	3,439	1,538
Percentage	1.14%	0.51%
Vice Mayor before election
Monique Lagdameo
UNA
Elected Vice Mayor
Monique Lagdameo
UNA

Local elections were held in Makati on May 13, 2019, within the Philippine general election. The voters will elect for the elective local posts in the city: the mayor, vice mayor, the two Congressmen, and the eight councilors, eight in each of the city's two legislative districts.

== Background ==
Incumbent mayor Abigail Binay assumed as Mayor after winning in the 2016 elections. Binay ran after the Office of the Ombudsman dismissed her brother, former Mayor Junjun Binay due to the alleged overpricing of Makati City Hall Building II. She is running for reelection under the United Nationalist Alliance. Her main opponent is her brother, former mayor Junjun. The former mayor claims that he has a deal with her sister, that Mayor Abby will serve for just one term as Mayor. The Ombudsman dismissed Binay due to the Makati City Hall Building II parking lot fiasco and was perpetually disqualified from holding any public office. However, the Commission on Elections reiterates that Binay can still run for Mayor, because the ruling is not yet final and executory. The former mayor has the support of majority of councilors and Barangay Captains in Makati. In an interview on 24 Oras, he will withdraw his candidacy for Mayor if his father, former Vice President Jejomar Binay will run for Mayor.

== Campaign ==
On April 27, 2019, siblings and mayoral rivals Abigail Binay and Junjun Binay had a heated public exchange during a pre-election forum hosted by the Parish Pastoral Council for Responsible Voting (PPCRV) at the San Ildefonso Parish in Barangay Pio del Pilar, gaining widespread attention. The conflict began when Junjun accused the police and security of a local official of "escorting the number one drug lord of Makati," leading to a confrontation with Abigail. Their father, former Vice President and 1st district congressional candidate Jejomar Binay, and Makati City Police Station chief Pablo Simon had to intervene to ease the tension. The PPCRV criticized the incident, with its vice chairman Johnny Cardenas stating that the confrontation was a "scene" that lacked respect for the church. He added that the siblings were asked beforehand to refrain from personal attacks and to focus on their platforms. The Binay siblings and their sister, Senator Nancy Binay, later apologized for the incident.

The family feud also became a public matter when Senator Nancy Binay claimed her siblings' rift was due to Abigail's husband, 2nd district Representative Luis Campos. She claimed that the Campos couple stopped talking to the Binay family and had been skipping weekly family lunches since 2016. Furthermore, she backed her brother's mayoral bid, stating that Abigail had failed to deliver the services that made their father famous as mayor. In a direct response, Abby called Nancy and Junjun "mean" for attacking her husband Luis.

== Candidates ==
=== Team Performance ===
United Nationalist Alliance/Nationalist People's Coalition/Team Performance
Name	Party
For Mayor
Mar-Len Abigail "Abby" S. Binay-Campos	UNA
For Vice Mayor
Monique "Nik" Lagdameo	UNA
For House Of Representative (1st District)
Jejomar "Jojo" C. Binay	UNA
For Councilor (1st District)
Virgilio "Jhong" Hilario Jr.	UNA
Anna Alcina "Alcine" M. Yabut	UNA
Jose "Joey" C. Villena IV	UNA
Martin John Pio Q. Arenas	UNA
Armando "Idol" P. Padilla	UNA
Rene Andrei "Rebo" Q. Saguisag Jr.	UNA
Carmina C. Ortega	UNA
Luis "Jojo" S. Javier Jr.	UNA
For House Of Representative (2nd District)
Luis Campos Jr.	NPC
For Councilor (2nd District)
Kristina "Ina" T. Sarosa	UNA
Arnold "Sammy" J. Cruz	UNA
Alden Almario	UNA
Benedict "Bodik" B. Baniqued	UNA
Ma. Dolores "Doc Doris" M. Arayon	UNA
Joel "Bong" M. Ariones	UNA
Ives M. Ebrada	UNA
Edralyn "Ed" M. Marquez	UNA

=== Team Be Nice ===
UNA Ang Makati/PDP–Laban/Team Be Nice
Name	Party
For Mayor
Jejomar Erwin "Junjun" S. Binay Jr.	UAM
For Vice Mayor
Manuel Monsour T. del Rosario III	PDP–Laban
For House Of Representative (1st District)
Jejomar "Jojo" C. Binay*	UNA
For Councilor (1st District)
Tosca Camille T. Puno-Ramos	UAM
Ma. Arlene M. Ortega	UAM
Rochelle G. Eusebio	UAM
Dim Ralyn N. Medina	UAM
Benhur L. Cruz	UAM
Kristine Mae "Kim" S. Casal-Reyes	UAM
Evangeline "Gel" T. Manotok	UAM
Michael A. Infante	UAM
For House Of Representative (2nd District)
Nemesio "King" S. Yabut Jr.	PDP–Laban
For Councilor (2nd District)
Leonardo "Leo" M. Magpantay	UAM
Shirley "Aspi" C. Aspillaga	UAM
Israel "Boyet" S. Cruzado	UAM
Vincent T. Sese	UAM
Grazielle Iony N. de Lara-Bes	UAM
Evelyn Delfina "Bing" E. Villamor	UAM
Henry A. Jacome	UAM
Michael C. Tolentino	UAM

- Guest candidate

=== Team Pagbabago 2019 ===
PDP–Laban/Independent/Team Pagbabago 2019
Name	Party
For Mayor
Wilfredo "Willy" M. Talag	PDP–Laban
For Vice Mayor
Roberto M. Lantin	Independent
For House Of Representative (1st District)
Brigido P. Mesina Jr.	Independent
For Councilor (1st District)
Michael Anthony V. Abcede	PDP–Laban
Giovanni M. Manalo	PDP–Laban
Luther D. Lapira	PDP–Laban
Reynaldo C. Alzona	PDP–Laban
Orlando Stephen A. Solidum	PDP–Laban
Leopoldo N. Claracay	PDP–Laban
Elmer B. Virtus	PDP–Laban
Alberto T. Pante (withdrew)	PDP–Laban
For House Of Representative (2nd District)
Rodolfo D. Flores	Independent
For Councilor (2nd District)
McGreggory P. Almazan	PDP–Laban
Elizier C. Bongabong	PDP–Laban
Jerry P. Tan	PDP–Laban
Pedrito S. Evangelista	PDP–Laban
Bercel John S. Tabian	PDP–Laban
Rolando T. Reodique	PDP–Laban
Sadat L. Tanggote	PDP–Laban

=== Team Rene-Battle ===
Independent/Team Rene-Battle
Name	Party
For Mayor
Renato "Rene" L. Bondal	Independent
For Vice Mayor
Virgilio "Battle" Batalla	Independent
For House Of Representative (1st District)
Ferdinand T. Sevilla	Independent
For Councilor (1st District)
Estelita "Star Uy" Manila	Independent
Jessielin "Jessy" O. Trinidad	Independent
Ricardo "Ric Nepo" C. Nepomuceno	Independent
Arlen G. delos Angeles	Independent
Ruben C. Enciso	Independent
Ross Ives Vincens W. Valentin	Independent
Julius M. Matullano	Independent
Elpidio B. Valino	Independent
For House Of Representative (2nd District)
Ricardo L. Opoc	Independent
For Councilor (2nd District)
Myla C. Liwanag	Independent
Nilo R. Cumpa	Independent

=== Independent Candidates ===
Independent
Name	Party
For Mayor
Carmelle Ainne R. Alanzalon	Independent
For Vice Mayor
Rodolfo "Rod" D. Biolena	Independent

=== Other Non-Independent Candidates ===
Liberal Party
For House of Representative (1st District)
Romulo "Kid" Peña Jr.	Liberal

Bigkis Pinoy Movement
For Mayor
Ricardo "Ricky" S. Yabut	Bigkis

Partido Federal ng Pilipinas
For Councilor (1st District)
Imelda I. Mangalino	PFP

Philippine Green Republican Party
For Councilor (1st District)
Alberto G. Diaz	PGRP

== Results ==
=== Representative ===
==== 1st District ====
Incumbent Monsour del Rosario is running for Vice Mayor. His slate named former Vice President Jejomar Binay, who is running against, among others, former acting city mayor Kid Peña.

2019 Philippine House of Representatives election in Makati's 1st District
Party	Candidate	Votes	%
Liberal	Kid Peña	71,035	48.27
UNA	Jejomar Binay	65,229	44.32
Independent	Brigido Mesina Jr.	1,213	0.82
Independent	Ferdinand Sevilla	728	0.50
Valid ballots		138,205	93.91
Invalid or blank votes		8,959	6.09
Total votes		147,164	100.00
Liberal gain from PDP–Laban			

==== 2nd District ====
Incumbent Luis Campos Jr. is running for reelection. His opponents are city councilor Nemesio "King" Yabut Jr., Rodolfo Flores and Ricardo Opoc.

2019 Philippine House of Representatives election in Makati's 2nd District
Party	Candidate	Votes	%
NPC	Luis Campos Jr. (incumbent)	90,736	57.44
PDP–Laban	Nemesio "King" Yabut Jr.	63,245	40.04
Independent	Rodolfo Flores	2,293	1.45
Independent	Ricardo Opoc	1,687	1.07
Valid ballots		157,961	91.00
Invalid or blank votes		15,702	9.00
Total votes		173,663	100.00
NPC hold			

=== Mayor ===
Incumbent mayor Abigail Binay won against her brother, former mayor Junjun Binay, Ricky Yabut (son of former mayor Nemesio Yabut), lawyer Rene Bondal, perennial candidate Willy Talag, and independent candidate Carmelle Alanzalon.

Makati Mayoralty Election
Party	Candidate	Votes	%
UNA	Abigail Binay (incumbent)	179,522	58.26
UAM	Junjun Binay	98,653	32.01
Bigkis	Ricardo "Ricky" Yabut	23,721	7.69
Independent	Renato "Rene" Bondal	3,565	1.15
PDP–Laban	Wilfredo "Willy" Talag	1,541	0.50
Independent	Carmelle Ainne Alanzalon	1,101	0.35
Total votes		308,103	100.00
UNA hold			

=== Vice Mayor ===
Incumbent vice mayor Monique Lagdameo won against incumbent 1st district representative Monsour del Rosario, Virgilio Batalla (Independent), Roberto Lantin (Independent), and Rod Biolena.

Makati Vice Mayoralty Election
Party	Candidate	Votes	%
UNA	Monique Lagdameo (incumbent)	182,655	60.82
PDP–Laban	Monsour del Rosario	105,153	35.01
Independent	Virgilio "Battle" Batalla	7,522	2.50
Independent	Roberto Lantin	3,439	1.14
Independent	Rodolfo "Rod" Biolena	1,538	0.51
Total votes		300,307	100.00
UNA hold			

=== Councilors ===
==== 1st District ====
Seven out of eight council seats in this district were won by Team Performance candidates.

Makati City Council Election – 1st District
Party	Candidate	Votes	%
UNA	Virgilio "Jhong" Hilario Jr. (incumbent)	90,525	9.77
UNA	Anna Alcina "Alcine" M. Yabut	78,590	8.49
UNA	Luis "Jojo" S. Javier Jr. (incumbent)	60,572	6.54
UNA	Jose "Joey" C. Villena IV	56,704	6.12
UNA	Martin John Pio Q. Arenas	53,590	5.78
UNA	Armando "Idol" P. Padilla	52,724	5.69
UNA	Rene Andrei "Rebo" Q. Saguisag Jr.	48,738	5.26
UAM	Tosca Camille T. Puno-Ramos (incumbent)^{[A]}	47,568	5.13
UNA	Carmina C. Ortega	46,338	5.01
UAM	Ma. Arlene M. Ortega	45,011	4.86
UAM	Rochelle G. Eusebio	44,848	4.84
UAM	Dim Ralyn N. Medina	42,035	4.54
UAM	Benhur L. Cruz	40,148	4.34
UAM	Kristine Mae "Kim" S. Casal-Reyes	36,978	3.99
UAM	Evangeline "Gel" T. Manotok	35,301	3.81
UAM	Michael A. Infante	32,831	3.55
PDP–Laban	Michael Anthony V. Abcede	16,667	1.80
Independent	Estelita "Star Uy" Manila	14,590	1.58
Independent	Jessielin "Jessy" O. Trinidad	12,262	1.32
Independent	Ricardo "Ric Nepo" C. Nepomuceno	9,879	1.07
Independent	Arlen G. Delos Angeles	7,757	0.84
Independent	Ruben C. Enciso	7,112	0.77
Independent	Ross Ives Vincens W. Valentin	5,985	0.65
PDP–Laban	Giovanni M. Manalo	5,834	0.63
PDP–Laban	Luther D. Lapira	5,540	0.60
PDP–Laban	Reynaldo C. Alzona	4,808	0.52
PDP–Laban	Orlando Stephen C. Solidum	4,748	0.51
Independent	Julius M. Matullano	4,559	0.49
PDP–Laban	Leopoldo N. Claracay	3,716	0.40
PFP	Imelda I. Mangalino	3,516	0.38
Independent	Elpidio Valino	3,100	0.33
PDP–Laban	Elmer B. Virtus	3,089	0.33
PGRP	Alberto G. Diaz	2,592	0.28
PDP–Laban	Alberto T. Pante (withdrew)	0	0.00
Total votes		925,663	100.00

Notes

- A Incumbent Rico J. Puno died on October 30, 2018. His daughter, former councilor Tosca Camille Puno-Ramos, was named as his substitute.

==== 2nd District ====
Five out of eight council seats in this district were won by Team Performance candidates. Three UNA ang Makati candidates also made the cut.

Makati City Council Election – 2nd District
Party	Candidate	Votes	%
UNA	Kristina "Ina" T. Sarosa	96,131	8.23
UAM	Leonardo "Leo" M. Magpantay (incumbent)	82,279	7.04
UNA	Arnold "Sammy" J. Cruz	79,387	6.79
UAM	Shirley "Aspi" C. Aspillaga (incumbent)	79,112	6.77
UNA	Alden Almario	78,093	6.68
UAM	Israel "Boyet" S. Cruzado (incumbent)	74,713	6.39
UNA	Benedict "Bodik" B. Baniqued	71,473	6.11
UNA	Ma. Dolores "Doc Doris" M. Arayon	69,191	5.92
UNA	Joel "Bong" M. Ariones	68,801	5.89
UAM	Vincent T. Sese	66,310	5.68
UAM	Grazielle Iony N. De Lara-Bes	64,953	5.56
UAM	Evelyn Delfina "Bing" E. Villamor	58,428	5.00
UAM	Henry A. Jacome	56,929	4.87
UNA	Ives M. Ebrada	53,740	4.60
UNA	Edralyn "Ed" M. Marquez	53,010	4.54
UAM	Michael C. Tolentino	52,045	4.46
PDP–Laban	McGreggory P. Almazan	9,376	0.80
PDP–Laban	Elizier C. Bongabong	9,125	0.78
PDP–Laban	Jerry P. Tan	8,811	0.75
Independent	Myla C. Liwanag	8,753	0.75
PDP–Laban	Pedrito S. Evangelista	7,921	0.68
Independent	Nilo R. Cumpa	5,474	0.47
PDP–Laban	Bercel John S. Tabian	5,297	0.45
PDP–Laban	Rolando T. Reodique	4,815	0.41
PDP–Laban	Sadat L. Tanggote	3,892	0.33
Total votes		1,168,059	100.00
