= 2007 Makati local elections =

5th City elections in Makati

2007 Makati mayoral elections
- May 14, 2007
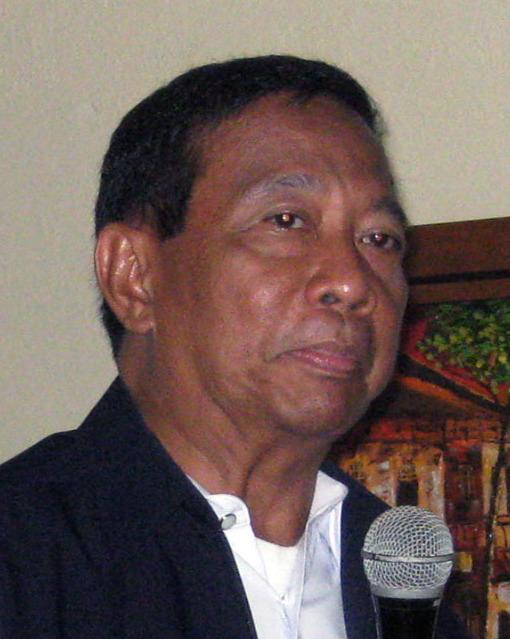

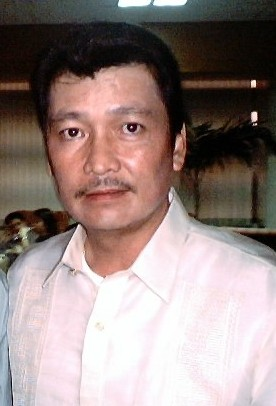
Nominee	Jejomar Binay	Lito Lapid	Elias Dulalia
Party	PDP–Laban	Lakas	Independent
Alliance	Performance Team	Team Lakas-Kampi
Running mate	Ernesto Mercado	Nemesio Yabut Jr.
Popular vote	198,814	22,461	1,243
Percentage	89.35	10.09	0.56
Mayor before election
Jejomar Binay
PDP–Laban
Elected mayor
Jejomar Binay
PDP–Laban

Vice mayoral election
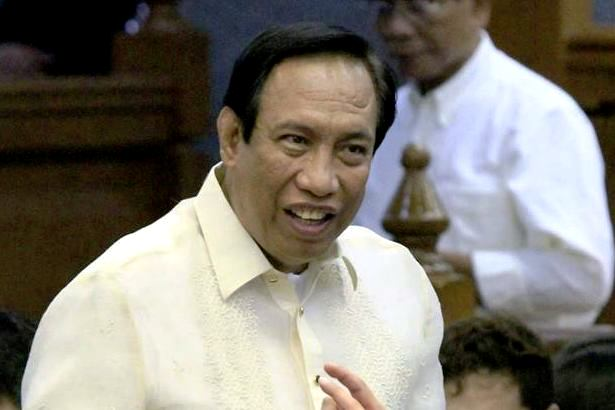

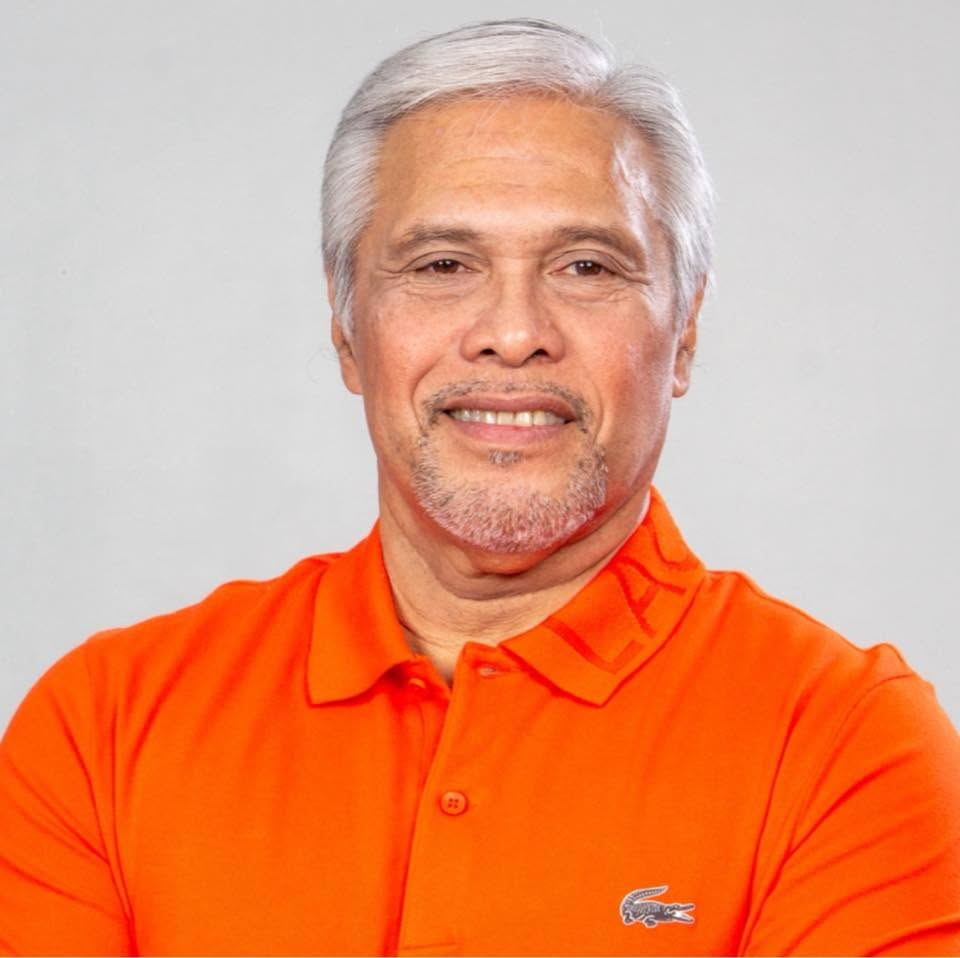
Candidate	Ernesto S. Mercado	Nemesio Yabut Jr.
Party	PDP–Laban	Lakas
Alliance	Performance Team	Team Lakas-Kampi
Popular vote	151,431	49,024
Percentage	75.76	24.24
Vice Mayor before election
Ernesto Mercado
PDP–Laban
Elected Vice Mayor
Ernesto Mercado
PDP–Laban

City Council election
16 of 18 seats in the Makati City Council 10 seats needed for a majority
	First party	Second party	Third party
Party	PDP–Laban	Independent	LDP
Last election	15	1	0
Seats won	11	1	1
Seat change	▼4	1	▲1
Popular vote	716,655	73,738	67,799

Local elections were held in the Makati on May 14, 2007, within the 2007 Philippine general election. The voters elected for the elective local posts in the city: the mayor, vice mayor, two district representatives, and councilors, eight in each of the city's two legislative districts.

== Background ==
Incumbents Jejomar Binay and Ernesto Mercado were running for their third consecutive term as mayor and vice mayor of Makati, respectively. Their main opponent, Senator Lito Lapid announced his candidacy for mayoral bid, with second district councilor Nemesio "King" Yabut Jr. as his running mate. Should Lapid lose, he would return to the Senate to finish his unexpired term that would last until 2010. The other candidate is businessman Elias Dulalia.

== Candidates ==
=== Performance Team ===
PDP–Laban/Liberal Party/Nationalist People's Coalition/Laban ng Demokratikong Pilipino/Performance Team
Name	Party
For Mayor
Jejomar "Jojo" C. Binay	PDP–Laban
For Vice Mayor
Ernesto "Nestor" S. Mercado	PDP–Laban
For House Of Representative (1st District)
Teodoro "Teddy Boy" L. Locsin Jr.	PDP–Laban
For Councilor (1st District)
Jejomar Erwin "Junjun" S. Binay Jr.	PDP–Laban
Monique "Nik" Lagdameo	PDP–Laban
Tosca Camille T. Puno-Ramos	PDP–Laban
Virgilio "VirJhong" V. Hilario Sr.	PDP–Laban
Armando "Idol" P. Padilla	PDP–Laban
Erlinda "Linda" S. Gonzales	Liberal
Arnold "Idol" C. Magpantay	NPC
Luis "Jojo" S. Javier Jr.	Independent
For House Of Representative (2nd District)
Mar-Len Abigail "Abby" S. Binay-Campos	PDP–Laban
For Councilor (2nd District)
Israel "Boyet" S. Cruzado	Independent
Ernesto "Aspi" A. Aspillaga	PDP–Laban
Vincent T. Sese	PDP–Laban
Elias "Boy" V. Tolentino	LDP
Salvador "Buddy" D. Pangilinan	PDP–Laban
Henry A. Jacome	PDP–Laban
Ma. Theresa "Tetchie" Nillo-de Lara	PDP–Laban
Angelito "Angie" D. Gatchalian	PDP–Laban

=== Team Lakas-Kampi ===
Lakas-CMD/Kabalikat ng Malayang Pilipino/Team Lakas-Kampi
Name	Party
For Mayor
Manuel "Lito" M. Lapid	Lakas
For Vice Mayor
Nemesio "King" S. Yabut Jr.	Lakas
For House Of Representative (1st District)
Oscar M. Ibay	Lakas
For Councilor (1st District)
Anthony "Ton" F. Genuino	KAMPI
Manuel Monsour T. del Rosario III	KAMPI
Frederick A. Ibay	Lakas
Jessielin "Jessy" O. Trinidad	Lakas
Nilo "Bobbit" B. Lopez Jr.	Lakas
Ricardo "Dick" T. Javier	KAMPI
Ronald M. Cahanding	Lakas
Felicisimo P. Bascon Jr.	Lakas
For House Of Representative (2nd District)
Erwin "Win" F. Genuino	Lakas
For Councilor (2nd District)
Aristotle B. Viray	Lakas
Elena B. Maccay	Lakas
Benedict "Bodik" B. Baniqued	KAMPI
Artemio "Art" A. Contreras II	KAMPI
Pedro R. Yabut Jr.	Lakas
Napoleon "Nap" M. Malimas	Lakas
Ceferino "Jun" V. Peralta Jr.	KAMPI
Catalina "Lina" A. Balaoing	KAMPI

=== Independent Candidates ===
Independent
Name	Party
For Mayor
Elias B. Dulalia	Independent
For Councilor (1st District)
John Mark C. Santiago	Independent
Racquel A. Manalili	Independent
Pedro P. Dadula	Independent
Eliseo T. Punzalan	Independent
Peter John C. Gonzalez	Independent
Edmundo "Eddie" H. Tagalog	Independent
Maximo B. Dilla	Independent
For Councilor (2nd District)
Ana-Luz "Atty. Luz" B. Cristal-Tenorio	Independent
Alfredo N. Lapasaran	Independent
Antonio "Tony" B. Villegas	Independent

=== Other Non-Independent Candidates ===
Lakas-CMD
For Councilor (2nd District)
Antonio "Tony" G. Manalili	Lakas

Laban ng Demokratikong Pilipino
For Councilor (2nd District)
John Christian M. Montes	LDP

== Results ==
=== Mayor ===
Incumbent mayor Jejomar Binay defeated Senator Lito Lapid and independent candidate Elias Dulalia in a landslide.

Makati mayoral election
Party	Candidate	Votes	%
PDP–Laban	Jejomar Binay	198,814	89.35
Lakas	Lito Lapid	22,461	10.09
Independent	Elias Dulalia	1,243	0.56
Total votes		222,518	100.00
PDP–Laban hold			

=== Vice Mayor ===
Incumbent vice mayor Ernesto Mercado handily defeated incumbent 2nd district councilor Nemesio "King" Yabut Jr.

Makati vice mayoral election
Party	Candidate	Votes	%
PDP–Laban	Ernesto "Nestor" Mercado	151,431	75.76
Lakas	Nemesio "King" Yabut Jr.	48,456	24.24
Total votes		199,887	100.00
PDP–Laban hold			

=== Representative ===
==== 1st District ====
Teodoro Locsin Jr. is the incumbent. He defeated former 1st district councilor Oscar Ibay.

2007 Philippine House of Representatives election at Makati's 1st District
Party	Candidate	Votes	%
PDP–Laban	Teodoro Locsin Jr.	85,598	83.03
Lakas	Oscar Ibay	17,489	16.97
Total votes		103,087	100.00
PDP–Laban hold			

==== 2nd District ====
Incumbent Butz Aquino is term-limited. Abigail Binay, a daughter of incumbent Mayor Jejomar Binay, defeated Erwin Genuino, son of PAGCOR Chairman Ephraim Genuino.

2007 Philippine House of Representatives election at Makati's 2nd District
Party	Candidate	Votes	%
PDP–Laban	Abigail Binay	70,904	63.25
Lakas	Erwin "Win" Genuino	41,191	36.75
Total votes		112,095	100.00
PDP–Laban gain from LDP			

=== City Council ===
==== 1st District ====
All eight candidates of the Performance Team won in this district.

City Council election at Makati's 1st district
Party	Candidate	Votes	%
PDP–Laban	Jejomar Erwin "Junjun" S. Binay Jr.	78,372	
PDP–Laban	Monique "Nik" Lagdameo	68,606	
PDP–Laban	Tosca Camille T. Puno-Ramos	61,828	
PDP–Laban	Virgilio "VirJhong" V. Hilario Sr.	60,974	
PDP–Laban	Armando "Idol" P. Padilla	55,573	
Liberal	Erlinda "Linda" S. Gonzales	53,235	
NPC	Arnold "Idol" C. Magpantay	51,813	
Independent	Luis "Jojo" S. Javier Jr.	49,467	
KAMPI	Antonio "Ton" F. Genuino	40,106	
Lakas	Manuel Monsour T. del Rosario III	35,790	
Independent	John Mark C. Santiago	24,795	
Lakas	Frederick A. Ibay	21,994	
Lakas	Jessielin "Jessy" O. Trinidad	18,010	
Lakas	Nilo "Bobbit" B. Lopez Jr.	13,345	
KAMPI	Ricardo "Dick" T. Javier	10,989	
Lakas	Ronaldo M. Cahanding	9,940	
Independent	Racquel A. Manalili	6,460	
Independent	Pedro P. Dadula	6,453	
Independent	Eliseo T. Punzalan	6,071	
Independent	Peter John C. Gonzalez	5,370	
Lakas	Feliciano P. Bascon Jr.	3,261	
Independent	Edmundo "Eddie" H. Tagalog	3,144	
Independent	Maximo B. Dilla	2,929	
Total votes			

==== 2nd District ====
All eight candidates of the Performance Team won in this district.

City Council election at Makati's 2nd district
Party	Candidate	Votes	%
Independent	Israel "Boyet" S. Cruzado	73,738	
PDP–Laban	Ernesto "Aspi" A. Aspillaga	72,291	
PDP–Laban	Vincent T. Sese	68,233	
LDP	Elias "Boy" V. Tolentino	67,799	
PDP–Laban	Salvador "Buddy" D. Pangilinan	66,751	
PDP–Laban	Henry A. Jacome	65,427	
PDP–Laban	Ma. Theresa "Tetchie" Nillo-de Lara	61,472	
PDP–Laban	Angelito "Angie" D. Gatchalian	57,128	
Lakas	Aristotle B. Viray	37,227	
Lakas	Elena B. Maccay	29,110	
KAMPI	Benedict "Bodik" B. Baniqued	23,592	
LDP	John Christian M. Montes	22,583	
KAMPI	Artemio "Art" A. Contreras II	22,575	
Independent	AnaLuz "Atty. Luz" B. Cristal-Tenorio	21,913	
Lakas	Pedro R. Yabut Jr.	21,792	
Lakas	Napoleon "Nap" M. Malimas	16,552	
KAMPI	Ceferino "Jun" V. Peralta Jr.	15,027	
KAMPI	Catalina "Lina" A. Balaoing	14,533	
Lakas	Antonio "Tony" G. Manalili	10,357	
Independent	Alfredo N. Lapasaran	4,862	
Independent	Antonio "Tony" B. Villegas	4,052	
Total votes			
