= Monsour del Rosario =

Taekwondo practitioner, martial arts actor

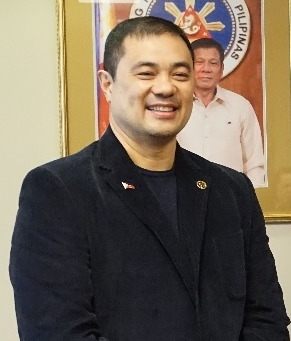
- Del Rosario in 2016

Member of the Philippine House of Representatives from Makati's 1st district
- In office June 30, 2016 – June 30, 2019
- Preceded by: Monique Lagdameo
- Succeeded by: Kid Peña

Member of the Makati City Council from the 1st District
- In office June 30, 2010 – June 30, 2016

Personal details
- Born: May 11, 1965 (age 61)
- Party: UNA (2012–2018, 2024–present)
- Other political affiliations: Reporma (2021–2024); PDP–Laban (2018–2021); Nacionalista (2009–2012); Lakas (2006–2009)
- Spouse: Joy Zapanta
- Relations: Albert del Rosario (uncle)
- Education: De La Salle University (BA)
- Occupation: Athlete, actor, politician, businessman
- Sports career
- Sport: Taekwondo
- Coached by: Hong Sung-chon
Medal record
Representing Philippines
Men's taekwondo
World Championships
Bronze medal – third place	1985 Seoul	Lightweight
Asian Games
Bronze medal – third place	1986 Seoul	Lightweight

Manuel Monsour del Rosario III (born May 11, 1965) is a Filipino actor, martial artist, producer, businessman, and politician. He is popularly known as a Filipino taekwondo champion and actor who starred in several Filipino and international action films. He is the Secretary General of the Philippine Taekwondo Association and a member of the Philippine Olympic National Sports Association Martial Arts Council. He has also served as a city councilor from the 1st district of Makati from 2010 to 2016 and later as congressman representing the same district from 2016 to 2019.

== Early life and education ==
Manuel Monsour T. del Rosario III was born in Manila on May 11, 1965. His mother was from Lebanon. He was raised in his family's hometown of Bacolod. Del Rosario has cited Bruce Lee as one of his idols and recalled being bullied as a skinny nine-year-old boy. He attributed some of the bullying to his inability to speak Illongo, as he spoke only English and Spanish at the time, as well as to his mestizo background. He later attended the De La Salle University in Manila.

== Taekwondo career ==
Del Rosario began his martial arts training under Joe Lopez-Vito, a practitioner of Tang Soo Do in the Moo Duk Kwan system. After returning to Manila for high school, he switched to taekwondo in 1977, training under Hong Sung-chon. Under Hong's instruction, del Rosario eventually earned a Korean 6th Dan black belt in taekwondo.

Del Rosario became a member of the Philippine national taekwondo team from 1982 until 1989, serving as the team's captain in his last four years on the team.

He was ranked first in the Philippines in the lightweight division while he was on the team, and was an eight-time national lightweight champion. He competed in several international competitions, including the 1988 Summer Olympics in Seoul, the Southeast Asian Games, the Asian Games, the World Games, the World Taekwondo Championships and the Asian Taekwondo Championships.

He earned a gold medal in the 1987 and 1989 SEA Games, a bronze medal in the 1986 Asian Games, and reached the quarterfinal round during the 1988 Olympics.

Along with Stephen Fernandez, del Rosario established the Olympians Taekwondo Training Center, a taekwondo dojang (school) in Taguig.

Del Rosario was recognized by the Kukkiwon for his promotion of taekwondo, when the body conferred him the Award for a Proud Taekwondo in 2017 becoming the first non-Korea to receive the honor.

== Acting career ==
Del Rosario was convinced by his taekwondo instructor Hong, to enter the entertainment industry to help popularize the martial arts in the Philippines. His preference in speaking English and lack of fluency in Tagalog affected his early career. He joined workshops of Bibsy Carballo to improve on his skill as an actor.

He later became known for his portrayals in action films in the 1990s. Among His more notable starring roles were in Bangis (1995), Buhawi Jack (1998) and Pintado (2000). He appeared in several international film productions, such as Demonstone (1990), Bloodfist II (1990), Techno Warriors (1998) working alongside international martial artist Darren Shahlavi, When Eagles Strike (2003), Bloodfist 2050 (2005) with young martial artist Matt Mullins, and The Hunt for Eagle One (2006). His recent films were Super Noypi (2005) and Tatlong Baraha (2006).

Del Rosario was offered to play a role in the action television series twice, Ang Probinsyano that of a congressman and a police official. He declined both after learning the characters are protectors of drug lords taking into account its effect on his reputation as a politician in real life.

The English-language 2018 martial arts film, The Trigonal marked as del Rosario's return to film. Although, he also featured in the Blood Hunters which was originally intended to premier a year prior.

Del Rosario appeared in the 2023 TV series, Black Rider.

== Political career ==
Del Rosario's exposure to politics came in 1998 when his former batchmate and Vice Mayor of Makati at the time Toro Yabut tried to convince him to run for councilor of Makati. He declined, still focusing on his career as a film actor. Edu Manzano, who was a vice mayor candidate at the time, tried to convince del Rosario to run as councilor. Again he declined, wanting to focus on his taekwondo business. In 2004, del Rosario declined another offer by Manzano due to his recent marriage.

Del Rosario first ran for councilor of Makati from the 1st district in 2007 under the ticket of mayoralty candidate and Senator Lito Lapid, but lost. While he had friends who are politicians, del Rosario was not part of a political family only able to cite his uncle Albert del Rosario as someone who is involved in government.

He ran for councilor in 2010 under Nacionalista Party and was successful this time. He was re-elected in 2013 under the United Nationalist Alliance (UNA), then the ruling party in Makati.

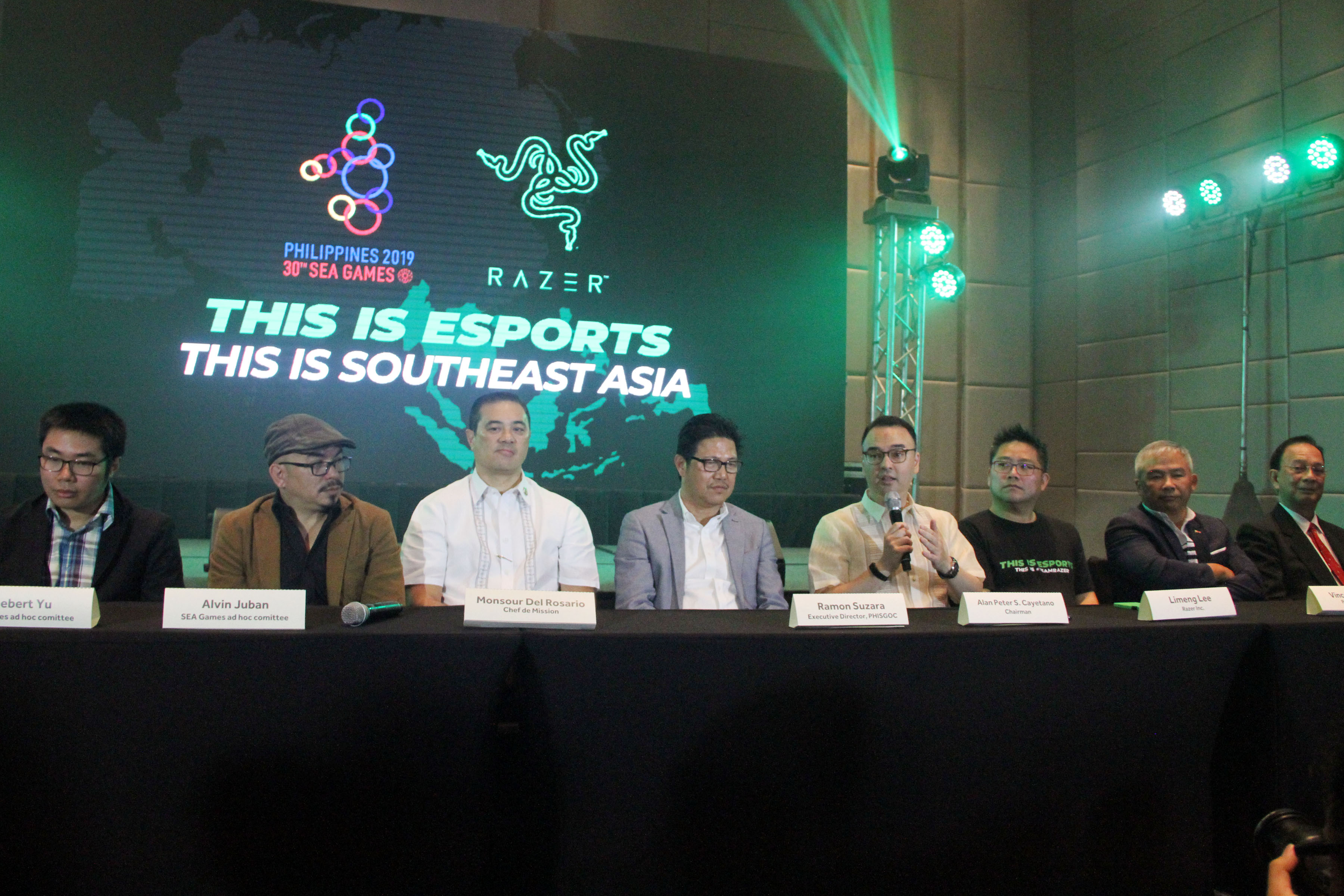
Del Rosario (third from left) during a press conference on the 2019 SEA Games at Manila Marriott Hotel, Newport World Resorts, Pasay in 2018

Initially running for re-election in 2016, he instead ran for representative of Makati's 1st district as a substitute to Ichi Yabut, who decided to seek re-election as a councillor instead, and he was elected to a three-year term. As a representative, he principally authored 58 House bills and 47 resolutions and co-authored 118 bills and 9 resolutions in total. The following are the bills he authored and enacted into law :

- Republic Act No. 11165: Telecommuting Act (as principal author)
- Republic Act No. 10931: Universal Access to Quality Tertiary Education Act (as co-author)
- Republic Act No. 10928: Philippine Passport Act (as co-author)
- Republic Act No. 10969: Free Irrigation Service Act (as co-author)
- Republic Act No. 11223: Universal Healthcare Act (as co-author)

Though eligible for re-election as representative, he ran for vice mayor of Makati in 2019 under the ruling PDP–Laban as the running mate of Junjun Binay, who ran under Una Ang Makati; however, they both lost. He ran for senator in 2022 under Reporma but lost, placing 29th overall.

He ran for vice mayor of Makati for the second time in 2025, this time as the running mate of Senator Nancy Binay and under UNA. However, he lost again, placing second to Kid Peña.

== Personal life ==
Del Rosario dated actress Dawn Zulueta. They ended their relation and Zulueta started a family of her own. Two of Zulueta's children enrolled at the del Rosario's Olympians Taekwondo Training Center.

Del Rosario himself went on to marry to Joy Zapanta. She suffered a miscarriage with their twins but later gave birth to their son Matthew in 2006 and their daughter Isabella, who grew up to be a taekwondo athlete.

== Electoral history ==
Electoral history of Monsour del Rosario
Year	Office	Party	Votes received				Result
Year	Office	Party	Total	%	P.	Swing	Result
2007	Councilor (Makati–1st)	Lakas	35,790	—N/a	10th	—N/a	Lost
2010	Councilor (Makati–1st)	Nacionalista	48,753	5.68%	6th	—N/a	Won
2013	Councilor (Makati–1st)	UNA	75,796	10.32%	3rd	+4.64	Won
2016	Representative (Makati–1st)	UNA	76,728	60.27%	1st	—N/a	Won
2019	Vice Mayor of Makati	PDP–Laban	105,153	35.01%	2nd	—N/a	Lost
2025	Vice Mayor of Makati	UNA	54,290	27.00%	2nd	-8.01	Lost
2022	Senator of the Philippines	Reporma	3,810,096	6.86%	29th	—N/a	Lost

== Filmography ==
=== Film ===
Year	Title	Role	Pruduction
1986	Gabi Na, Kumander		Viva Films
1986	Iisa Lang ang Dapat Mamatay		Imus Productions
1988	Enteng the Dragon		RVQ Productions
1989	Eagle Squad	Mon Rivera	Viva Films and Falcon Productions
1989	Hindi Pahuhuli Nang Buhay		Viva Films
1990	Demonstone	Pablo	
1990	Bloodfist II	Tobo Castanerra	
1990	Legend of Lost Dragon		Archer Films
1990	Dadaan Ka sa Ibabaw ng Aking Bangkay	Arnold	Red Horse Production and Seiko Films
1990	Subukan Kita Kung Kaya Mo!	Arnold	FLT Films
1990	Hanggang Kailan Ka Papatay	Hector	Regal Films and Moviestars Production
1991	Kidlat ng Maynila: Joe Pring 2	Nur Adiloka	Four-N Films and Moviestars Production
1991	Dinampot Ka Lang sa Putik	Ambet	Regal Films
1991	Lt. Jack Moreno, Medal of Valor: Habang Nasasaktan, Lalong Tumatapang	Cpl. Alvarez	Four-N Films
1991	Ganti ng Api	Andro	Vision Films
1991	Contreras Gang	Tenyente Lazaro	Moviestars Production
1992	Amang Capulong: Anak ng Tondo II	Amang Capulong	Four-N Films
1992	Alyas Hunyango	Victor	Omega Releasing Organization Inc.
1993	Maricris Sioson Story		Regal Films
1993	Magkasangga 2000	Sword Narding	Harvest Productions
1993	Lethal Panther 2	Nestor	Harvest International Films
1993	Kakambal Ko sa Tapang	Carding	Harvest International Films
1994	Massacre Files	Dante	Regal Films
1994	Chinatown 2: The Vigilantes		Four N Films
1994	Shake, Rattle & Roll V ("Maligno" segment)	Victor	Regal Films
1995	Romano Sagrado: Talim sa Dilim	Romano Sagrado	Regal Films
1995	Costales	Peter Cortez	Regal Films
1995	Escobar: Walang Sasantuhin - Lt. Escudero		Regal Films
1995	Bangis - Lt. Ariston Navarro		Regal Films
1995	Tough Beauty and the Sloppy Slop	Santos	
1996	Oki Doki Doc: The Movie	Taxi Driver	Star Cinema
1996	Huling Sagupaan - Leo		Regal Films
1997	Matang Aguila - Lt. Orlando Marquez		Regal Films
1997	Harangan - Lt. Willy Vergara		MaQ Productions and Regal Films
1997	Padre Kalibre - Marlon		Regal Films
1998	Techno Warriors	Ken	Filmswell International Limited
1998	Buhawi Jack - Buhawi Jack		Regal Films
1998	Codename: Bomba - Bernardo		Regal Films
1999	Kanang Kamay: Ituturo Mo, Itutumba Ko!	Paolo	MAQ Productions and Regal Films
1999	Luksong Tinik	Ado	Regal Films
1999	Pintado	Drigo	Regal Films
1999	Dugo ng Birhen: El Kapitan		Regal Films and Good Harvest Productions
1999	Lalaban Ako Hanggang sa Huling Hininga	Dario	Regal Films
2003	When Eagles Strike		Premiere Films
2004	Mano Mano 3: Ang Arnis Laban sa Kaaway	Dindo Aragon	Rocketts Films
2005	Uno	Mike	Rocketts Films
2006	The Hunt for Eagle One	Lt. Herman Reyes	
2006	Super Noypi	Diego	Regal Films
2006	Tatlong Baraha	Faustino	Lapid Films
2008	Namets!	Babyboy Labayen	
2016	Master	Philippine Senator	
2018	The Trigonal: Fight for Justice	Mike Vasquez	Viva Films
2019	Bato (The General Ronald dela Rosa Story)	Police officer	
2020	Blood Hunters: Rise of the Hybrids		
2024	Fuchsia Libre	Supremo	Mavx Productions

=== Television ===
Year	Title	Role
1997	O-Gag	
2002	Sa Puso Ko Iingatan Ka	Mario
2003	Narito ang Puso Ko	Ernesto San Vicente
2003	Basta't Kasama Kita	Ramir
2004	Spirits	Eric
2005	Maynila	
2006	Panday	Kaupay
2007	Rounin	Draco
2007	Zaido: Pulis Pangkalawakan	Izcaruz
2007–2009	Fit and Fast....	Host
2008	Kung Fu Kids	Yuen
2023	Black Rider	Nolan Alvarez

== See also ==
- Taekwondo in the Philippines

House of Representatives of the Philippines
Preceded by Monique Lagdameo	Representative, 1st district of Makati; 2016–2019	Succeeded by Romulo Peña Jr.
Party political offices
Vacant Title last held by Rico J. Puno	PDP–Laban nominee for Vice Mayor of Makati; 2019	Most recent
