= 2004 Makati local elections =

4th City elections in Makati

2004 Makati mayoral election
- May 14, 2004
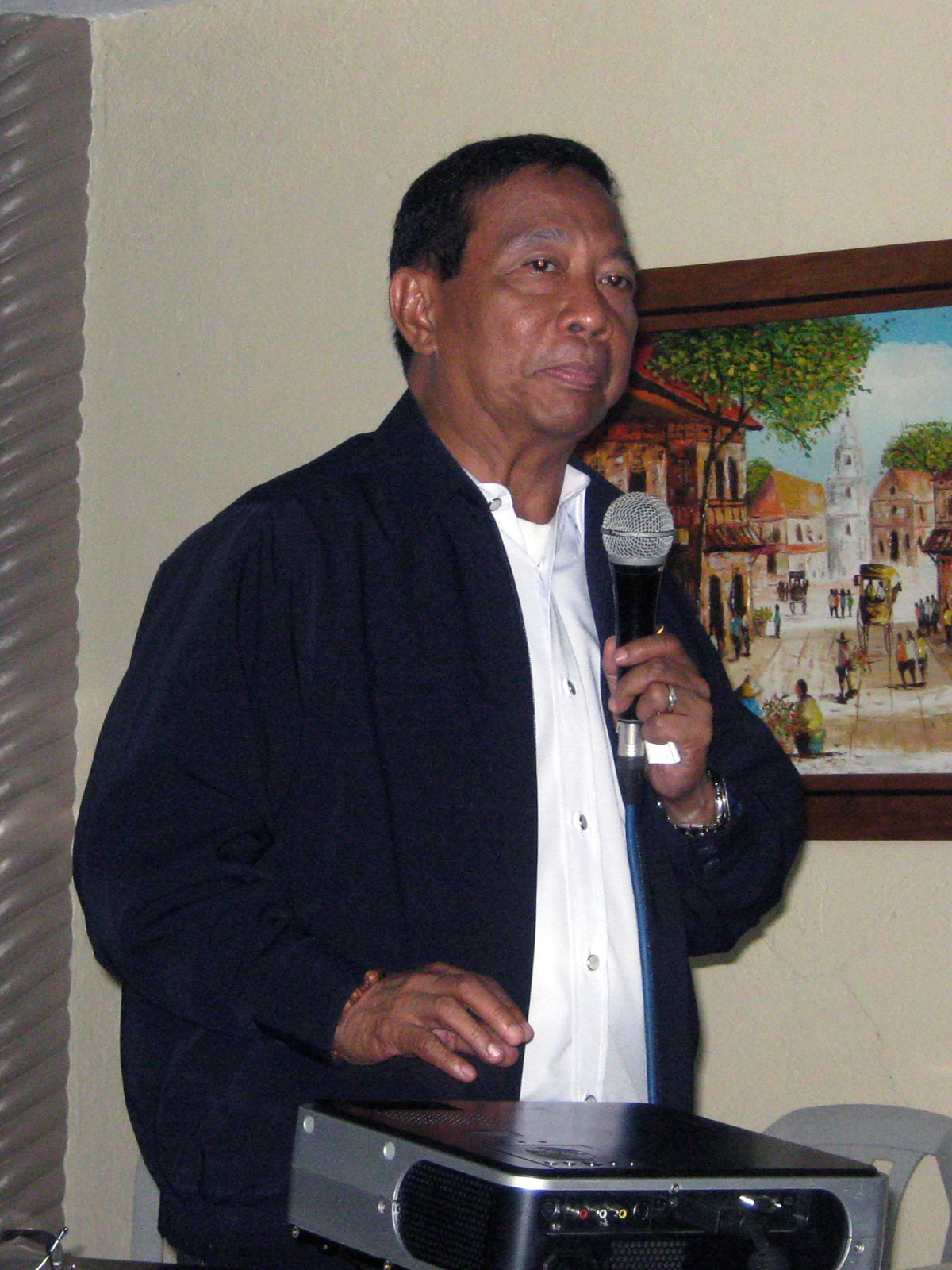
Nominee	Jejomar Binay	Oscar Ibay	Amado G. de Vera III
Party	PDP–Laban	Lakas	PIBID
Alliance	Performance Team	Team Ibay-Maccay
Running mate	Ernesto S. Mercado	Elena Maccay	Elena Maccay
Popular vote	186,655	50,518	1,197
Percentage	78.09	21.13	0.50
Nominee	Romeo Rempillo
Party	Independent
Popular vote	665
Percentage	0.28
Mayor before election
Jejomar Binay
PDP–Laban
Elected mayor
Jejomar Binay
PDP–Laban
- Vice mayoral election
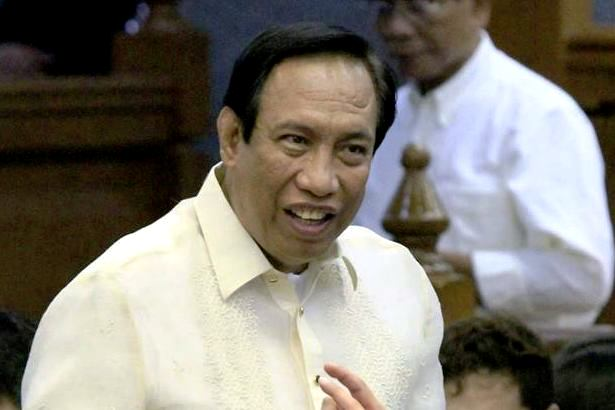

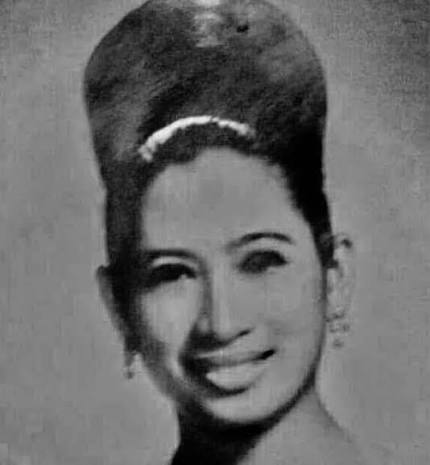

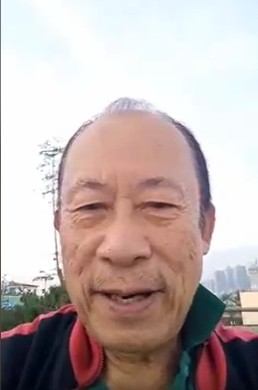
Candidate	Ernesto S. Mercado	Elena Maccay	John Arenas
Party	PDP–Laban	Lakas	Lakas
Alliance	Performance Team	Team Ibay-Maccay
Popular vote	146,809	56,956	15,942
Percentage	66.22	25.69	7.19
Candidate	Rodolfo Biolena
Party	Independent
Popular vote	1,998
Percentage	0.90
Vice Mayor before election
Ernesto Mercado
PDP–Laban
Elected Vice Mayor
Ernesto Mercado
PDP–Laban
- City Council election

16 of 18 seats in the Makati City Council 10 seats needed for a majority
	First party	Second party
Party	PDP–Laban	Independent
Alliance	Performance Team
Seats won	15	1

Local elections was held in the City of Makati on May 10, 2004, within the Philippine general election. The voters elected for the elective local posts in the city: the mayor, vice mayor, the two congressmen, and the councilors, eight in each of the city's two legislative districts.

== Background ==
Incumbent mayor Jejomar Binay of PDP–Laban will face 1st District Councilor Oscar Ibay from admin's Lakas–CMD, while Incumbent Vice Mayor Ernesto Mercado will face former 2nd District Councilor Elena Maccay. Binay also supported Fernando Poe Jr.'s candidacy for presidential elections, as Binay was one of Koalisyon ng Nagkakaisang Pilipino's executive committee members and Poe's campaign manager.

== Candidates ==
=== Performance Team ===
PDP–Laban/Liberal Party/Aksyon Demokratiko/Laban ng Demokratikong Pilipino/Performance Team
Name	Party
For Mayor
Jejomar "Jojo" C. Binay	PDP–Laban
For Vice Mayor
Ernesto "Nestor" S. Mercado	PDP–Laban
For House Of Representative (1st District)
Teodoro "Teddy Boy" L. Locsin Jr.	PDP–Laban
For Councilor (1st District)
Jejomar Erwin "Junjun" S. Binay Jr.	PDP–Laban
Monique "Nik" Lagdameo	PDP–Laban
Enrico "Rico J." Puno	PDP–Laban
Ricardo "Ric" S. Javier	PDP–Laban
Ferdinand Jacinto "Ferdie Tangol" T. Eusebio	PDP–Laban
Erlinda "Linda" S. Gonzales	Liberal
Romeo "Romy" C. Medina	Aksyon
Francisco Z. Lichauco	PDP–Laban
For House Of Representative (2nd District)
Agapito "Butz" A. Aquino	LDP
For Councilor (2nd District)
Israel "Boyet" S. Cruzado	Independent
Ernesto "Aspi" A. Aspillaga	PDP–Laban
Divina "Divine" A. Jacome	PDP–Laban
Elias "Boy" V. Tolentino	LDP
Romana "Baby" R. Pangilinan	PDP–Laban
Nelson "Doc" S. Pasia	PDP–Laban
Pedro A. Ibay	PDP–Laban
Liberato "Levi" G. Siaron	PDP–Laban

=== Team Ibay-Maccay ===
Lakas-CMD/Team Ibay-Maccay
Name	Party
For Mayor
Oscar M. Ibay	Lakas
For Vice Mayor
Elena B. Maccay	Lakas
For House Of Representative (1st District)
Mark Donald "Don" Bitanga	Lakas
For Councilor (1st District)
Edgardo Tolentino	Lakas
Arman Manalo	Lakas
Frederick C. Ibay	Lakas
Jessielin "Jessy" O. Trinidad	Lakas
Nilo "Bobbit" B. Lopez Jr.	Lakas
Racquel A. Manalili	Lakas
Ronaldo M. Cahanding	Lakas
Hilario Rivera	Lakas
For House Of Representative (2nd District)
Antonio "Tony" G. Manalili	Lakas
For Councilor (2nd District)
Eduardo "Ed" Causapin	Lakas
Flora "Flor" Peralta	Lakas
Erlinda "Dr. Linda" C. Usabal	Lakas
Alfredo N. Lapasaran	Lakas
Armando "Arman" I. Tercero	Lakas
Napoleon "Nap" M. Malimas	Lakas
Rolando "Rolly" T. Torrente	Lakas
Blanquita S. Fitzpatrick	Lakas

=== Independent Candidates ===
Independent
Name	Party
For Mayor
Romeo Rempillo	Independent
For Vice Mayor
Rodolfo "Rod" D. Biolena	Independent
For Councilor (1st District)
Miguel "Mace" B. Yabut Jr.	Independent
For Councilor (2nd District)
Nemesio "King" S. Yabut Jr.	Independent
Alicia "Alice" D. Paraan	Independent
Paulo Ortega	Independent
Nemesio "Manong" B. Beare	Independent

=== Other Non-Independent Candidates ===
Partido Isang Bansa, Isang Diwa
For Mayor
Amado G. de Vera III	PIBID

Lakas-CMD
For Vice Mayor
John J. Arenas	Lakas

Democratic Group for Integrity and Progress in the Philippines (DGIPP)
For Councilors (1st District)
Angelito Reyes	DGIPP
Eduardo Gusad	DGIPP

== Results ==
=== For Mayor ===
Incumbent mayor Jejomar Binay won against 1st District Councilor Oscar Ibay and two other independent candidates.

Makati Mayoral election
Party	Candidate	Votes	%
PDP–Laban	Jejomar Binay	186,655	78.09
Lakas	Oscar Ibay	50,518	21.13
PIBID	Amado de Vera III	1,197	0.50
Independent	Romeo Rempillo	665	0.28
Total votes		239,035	100.00
PDP–Laban hold			

=== For Vice Mayor ===
Incumbent vice mayor Ernesto Mercado won against former 2nd District Councilor Elena Maccay, John Arenas (Lakas) and Rod Biolena (Aksyon Demokratiko).

Makati Vice Mayoral election
Party	Candidate	Votes	%
PDP–Laban	Ernesto "Nestor" Mercado	146,809	66.22
Lakas	Elena Maccay	56,956	25.69
Lakas	John Arenas	15,942	7.19
Independent	Rodolfo "Rod" Biolena	1,998	0.90
Total votes		221,705	100.00
PDP–Laban hold			

=== For 1st district congressman ===
Incumbent Teddy Boy Locsin won against Donald Bitanga.

Makati 1st district representative election
Party	Candidate	Votes	%
PDP–Laban	Teodoro Locsin Jr.	96,765	88.71
Lakas	Mark Donald "Don" Bitanga	12,319	11.29
Total votes		109,084	100.00
PDP–Laban hold			

=== For 2nd district congressman ===
Former congressman Butz Aquino won against former 2nd district councilor Antonio Manalili.

Makati 2nd district representative election
Party	Candidate	Votes	%
LDP	Butz Aquino	86,937	79.44
Lakas	Antonio "Tony" Manalili	22,499	20.56
Total votes		109,436	100.00
LDP hold			

=== City Council ===
==== 1st District ====
All eight candidates of Performance Team won the city council seats for this district.

City Council election at Makati's 1st district
Party	Candidate	Votes	%
PDP–Laban	Jejomar Erwin "Junjun" S. Binay Jr.	78,926	
PDP–Laban	Enrico "Rico J." Puno	72,123	
PDP–Laban	Ricardo "Ric" S. Javier	72,031	
PDP–Laban	Ferdinand Jacinto "Ferdie Tangol" T. Eusebio	67,737	
Liberal	Erlinda "Linda" S. Gonzales	65,762	
Aksyon	Romeo "Romy" C. Medina	65,204	
PDP–Laban	Monique "Nik" Lagdameo	65,174	
PDP–Laban	Francisco Z. Lichauco	62,432	
Independent	Miguel "Mace" B. Yabut Jr.	45,025	
Lakas	Frederick C. Ibay	35,660	
Lakas	Jessielin "Jessy" O. Trinidad	21,612	
Lakas	Nilo "Bobbit" B. Lopez Jr.	21,138	
Lakas	Edgardo Tolentino	18,646	
Lakas	Arman Manalo	16,912	
Lakas	Ronaldo M. Cahanding	15,504	
Lakas	Racquel A. Manalili	15,194	
Lakas	Hilario Rivera	14,835	
DGIPP	Angelito Reyes	4,766	
DGIPP	Eduardo Gusad	1,531	

==== 2nd District ====
Seven of eight candidates of Performance Team won the city council seats for this district.

City Council election at Makati's 2nd district
Party	Candidate	Votes	%
PDP–Laban	Divina "Divine" A. Jacome	71,972	
PDP–Laban	Nelson "Doc" S. Pasia	69,196	
PDP–Laban	Pedro A. Ibay	68,560	
LDP	Elias "Boy" V. Tolentino	67,550	
Independent	Israel "Boyet" S. Cruzado	66,293	
PDP–Laban	Ernesto "Aspi" A. Aspillaga	66,046	
PDP–Laban	Romana "Baby" R. Pangilinan	61,604	
Independent	Nemesio "King" S. Yabut Jr.	61,139	
PDP–Laban	Liberato "Levi" G. Siaron	60,074	
Lakas	Napoleon "Nap" M. Malimas	26,998	
Lakas	Eduardo "Ed" Causapin	26,391	
Lakas	Flora "Flor" Peralta	24,402	
Lakas	Erlinda "Dr. Linda" C. Usabal	24,029	
Lakas	Alfredo N. Lapasaran	22,423	
Lakas	Armando "Arman" I. Tercero	21,157	
Lakas	Rolando "Rolly" T. Torrente	18,257	
Independent	Alicia "Alice" D. Paraan	11,079	
Lakas	Blanquita S. Fitzpatrick	9,755	
Independent	Paulo Ortega	6,739	
Independent	Nemesio "Manong" B. Beare	4,440	
