= Jejomar Binay Jr. =

Filipino politician (born 1977)

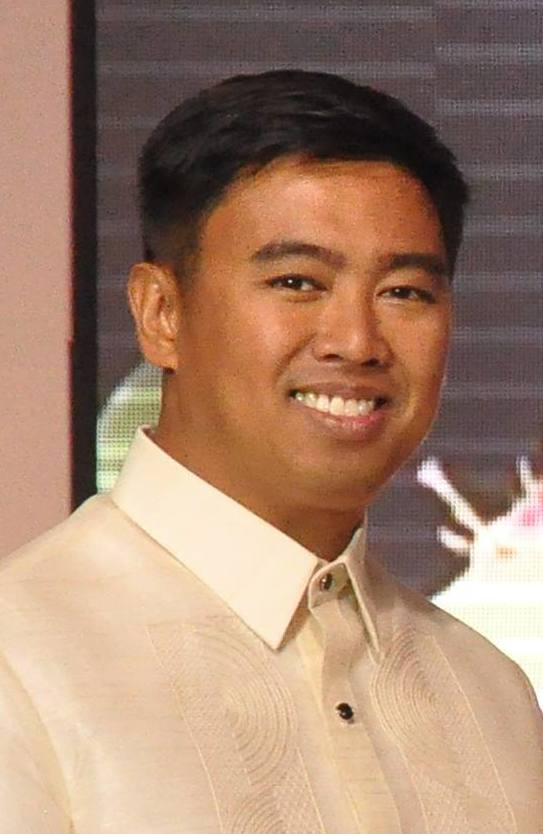
- Binay in July 2013

20th Mayor of Makati
- In office June 30, 2010 – June 30, 2015
- Vice Mayor: Romulo Peña Jr.
- Preceded by: Jejomar C. Binay
- Succeeded by: Romulo Peña Jr. (acting)

Member of the Makati City Council from the 1st district
- In office June 30, 2001 – June 30, 2010

Sangguniang Kabataan Chairman of Barangay San Antonio, Makati
- In office 1992–2001

Personal details
- Born: Jejomar Erwin Sombillo Binay Jr. July 12, 1977 (age 49) Makati, Metro Manila, Philippines
- Party: UNA Ang Makati (2018–present)
- Other political affiliations: UNA (2012–2018); PDP–Laban (2001–2012)
- Spouses: Kennely Ann Lacia (died 2009); Patricia Sandejas (m. 2023)
- Relations: Nancy Binay (sister); Abigail Binay (sister)
- Children: 4
- Parents: Jejomar Binay (father); Elenita Sombillo (mother)
- Education: University of the Philippines Diliman (BA, MPA)
- Occupation: Politician

Jejomar Erwin "Junjun" Sombillo Binay Jr. (born July 12, 1977) is a Filipino politician who served as the mayor of Makati from 2010 to 2015. He is the only son of former Vice President Jejomar Binay. He was initially dismissed from office by the Ombudsman of the Philippines but this decision was overturned by the Court of Appeals in a ruling dated May 3, 2018. He is perpetually banned from holding public office after the Court of Appeals affirmed on May 28, 2019, charges of grave misconduct, dishonesty and conduct prejudicial to the best interest of the service over the construction of a Makati school building.

== Early life ==
Binay was born on July 12, 1977, as the third of five children and the only son of Jejomar Binay and Elenita Sombillo. He is the younger brother of Nancy Binay, a current Mayor of Makati, and Abby Binay, the former mayor of Makati. From 1996 to 2001, Binay attended the University of the Philippines Diliman, where he graduated with a B.A. degree in Philippine studies major in Malikhaing Pagsulat (creative writing), and public administration, cum laude. He also holds a master's degree in public administration from the UP National College for Public Administration and Governance.

== Political career ==
At a young age, Binay was groomed by his father in local politics as a Sangguniang Kabataan (Youth Council) president of barangay San Antonio from 1992 to 2001 and later as city councilor for three consecutive terms.

During his days as councilor, he was concurrently chairman of the Committee of Rules, Legal Matters and Ethics and the Committee on Education, Arts and Sciences. He was also a member of three other committees.

Being barred by the constitution to run for a fourth consecutive term, he ran instead for mayor for the 2010 Makati local elections. He had singer and former councilor Rico J. Puno as his running mate for vice mayor. He won the mayoral race in a landslide victory, while Puno lost to outgoing vice mayor Ernesto Mercado's running mate, Councilor Kid Peña, who was a sectoral representative as Makati's Association of Barangay Captains (ABC) President. He took oath on June 28, 2010, before Senator Francis Escudero at the Makati City Hall.

In the May 13, 2013, Makati local elections, Binay won over token opponent Renato Bondal via a massive landslide by garnering 208,748 of the total popular votes to secure a second term.

On June 29, 2015, Binay received his second suspension order from the Office of the Ombudsman in connection to the corruption allegations in the construction of the ₱1.3-billion Makati Science High School building. One day later, Binay stepped down as Mayor of Makati.

Binay, together with 22 others, was charged by graft and falsification of documents cases by the Ombudsman filed before Sandiganbayan on February 19, 2016, in connection with the construction of Makati City Hall Building II (also known as the Makati City Hall Parking Building).

In 2019, Binay ran against his sister, incumbent Mayor Abby Binay, under the UNA Ang Makati local party. He chose Makati's 1st district representative Monsour del Rosario of PDP–Laban as his running mate for vice mayor. However, they were both unsuccessful, with Binay failing to regain the post.

Binay is perpetually barred from holding office after the Court of Appeals on May 28, 2019, found him guilty of serious dishonesty, grave misconduct, and conduct prejudicial to the best interest of the service over irregularities in the construction of the Makati Science High School building. Binay's lawyers said they will appeal the decision. In December 2024, however, the Sandiganbayan granted the demurrer and acquitted Jejomar Binay, Binay Jr. and all the accused in the case. In August 2025, the Sandiganbayan acquitted Binay and his father of graft, falsification of public documents, and malversation over the construction of the Makati City Hall Building II, citing lack of evidence.

== Electoral history ==
Electoral history of Jejomar Binay Jr.
Year	Office	Party	Votes received				Result
Year	Office	Party	Total	%	P.	Swing	Result
2001	Councilor (1st district)	PDP–Laban	64,329		2nd	—N/a	Won
2004	Councilor (1st district)	PDP–Laban	78,926		1st	—N/a	Won
2007	Councilor (1st district)	PDP–Laban	78,372		1st	—N/a	Won
2010	Mayor of Makati	PDP–Laban	125,664	46.02%	1st	—N/a	Won
2013	Mayor of Makati	UNA	208,748	83.06%	1st	—N/a	Won
2019	Mayor of Makati	UNA Ang Makati	98,653	32.01%	2nd	—N/a	Lost

== Controversies ==
On November 30, 2013, Binay, then the mayor of Makati, was involved in a standoff at the Banyan Gate of Dasmariñas Village in Makati. Security guards reportedly barred his convoy from exiting the gate due to a village policy that closes the exit late at night for security reasons. Contrary to reports of their detention, the three guards involved in the standoff were taken to the Makati Central Police Station only to seek clarification regarding village policies. Binay's spokesperson Joey Salgado maintained that the mayor was entitled to courtesy, while the village's residents and various groups criticized the incident as an overreach of power. The incident gained national attention after CCTV footage of the encounter was released by the Philippine Daily Inquirer.

== Personal life ==
Binay was married to Kennely Ann Lacia (1980–2009), who was also known as former ABS-CBN talent Audrey Vizcara, until her death on August 11, 2009. They had four children: Jejomarie Alexi, Maria Isabel, Jejomar III, and Maria Kennely. His wife died due to complications while giving birth to their fourth child, who survived despite being born prematurely and was named Maria Kennely in memory of her mother.

During his time as Mayor of Makati, he was romantically linked to Kris Aquino.

Binay married his second wife Patricia Sandejas in 2023. They first met during the ribbon-cutting ceremony of Bistro Mondo, a restaurant co-owned by the Sandejas family in Poblacion, Makati, in 2011.

Political offices
Preceded by Jejomar Binay	Mayor of Makati; 2010–2015	Succeeded by Romulo Peña Jr. Acting
