= The Trigonal: Fight for Justice =

Filipino action film

- Theatrical release poster
- Directed by: Vincent Soberano
- Produced by: Anthony Leo Aguirre
- Starring: Epy Quizon; Monsour Del Rosario; Rhian Ramos
- Cinematography: Takeyuki Onishi
- Edited by: Rex Villamor
- Music by: Johan Macaraeg; Danica Tolentino
- Production companies: Cinefenio Films; IndieGo Pictures; Piaya Network Broadcasting
- Distributed by: Viva Films
- Release date: September 26, 2018
- Running time: 122 minutes
- Country: Philippines
- Language: English

The Trigonal: Fight for Justice is a 2018 Philippine action film written and directed by Vincent Soberano starring Rhian Ramos, Epy Quizon and Monsour Del Rosario. The film was distributed by Viva Films and it first released in Singapore during the film festival of Cannes Film Market and was released in the Philippines on September 26, 2018.

Meant for international release, the film had its dialogue recorded in English.

== Cast ==
- Ian Ignacio as Jacob Casa
- Sarah Chang as Mei Li
- Rhian Ramos as Annie Casa
- Monsour Del Rosario as Mike Vasquez
- Gus Liem as Mike Vasquez
- Christian Vasquez as Allen
- Paul Allica as James Lowe
- John Arceo as MC
- Levi Ignacio as The Chemist
- Epy Quizon as Dodoy
- Jingliang Li as Mongolian Fighter
- Qian Li Yang as Master Li
- Eddie Tsai as Zhang
- Meiwa Javellana as Detective Sanchez
