= Jejomar Binay =

Filipino politician

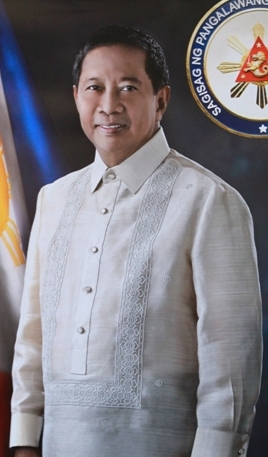
- Official portrait, 2011

13th Vice President of the Philippines
- In office June 30, 2010 – June 30, 2016
- President: Benigno Aquino III
- Preceded by: Noli de Castro
- Succeeded by: Leni Robredo

17th & 19th Mayor of Makati
- In office June 30, 2001 – June 30, 2010
- Vice Mayor: Ernesto Mercado
- Preceded by: Elenita Binay
- Succeeded by: Jejomar Binay Jr.
- In office February 2, 1988 – June 30, 1998
- Vice Mayor: Conchitina Sevilla-Bernardo (1988–89); Augusto Pangan (1989–92); Roberto Brillante (1992); Elena Maccay (1992); Arturo Yabut (1992–98)
- Preceded by: Sergio Santos (Acting)
- Succeeded by: Elenita Binay
- Officer-In-Charge
- In office February 27, 1986 – December 1, 1987
- Vice Mayor: Roberto Brillante
- Preceded by: Nemesio Yabut
- Succeeded by: Sergio Santos (Acting)

Chairman of the Metropolitan Manila Development Authority
- In office June 30, 1998 – January 20, 2001
- President: Joseph Estrada
- Preceded by: Prospero Oreta
- Succeeded by: Benjamin Abalos
- In office January 9, 1990 – June 30, 1991
- President: Corazon Aquino
- Preceded by: Office created
- Succeeded by: Ignacio Bunye

Governor of Metro Manila
- Acting
- In office December 31, 1987 – February 2, 1988
- Preceded by: Joey Lina (Acting)
- Succeeded by: Elfren Cruz (Acting)

3rd Chairman of Housing and Urban Development Coordinating Council
- In office June 30, 2010 – June 22, 2015
- President: Benigno Aquino III
- Preceded by: Noli de Castro
- Succeeded by: Chito Cruz

Presidential Adviser for Overseas Filipino Workers
- In office June 30, 2010 – June 22, 2015
- President: Benigno Aquino III

Personal details
- Born: Jesus Jose Cabauatan Binay (Note: His birth name was supposed to be Jesus Jose Maria Cabauatan Binay, but Maria was not entered into his birth certificate.); November 11, 1942 (age 84) (Note: According to his birth certificate, he was born on November 10, 1942. However, according to other official documents, he was born on November 11, 1942, which is the date he personally prefers.) Paco, Manila, Philippines
- Party: UNA (2012–present)
- Other political affiliations: PDP–Laban (1983–2014); UNO (2005–2010); Laban (1978–1983)
- Spouse: Elenita Sombillo (m. 1972)
- Children: 5 (including Nancy, Abigail and Jejomar Jr.)
- Education: University of the Philippines Diliman (BA, LLB); National Defense College of the Philippines; Philippine Christian University (MA); University of the Philippines Open University (Dip)
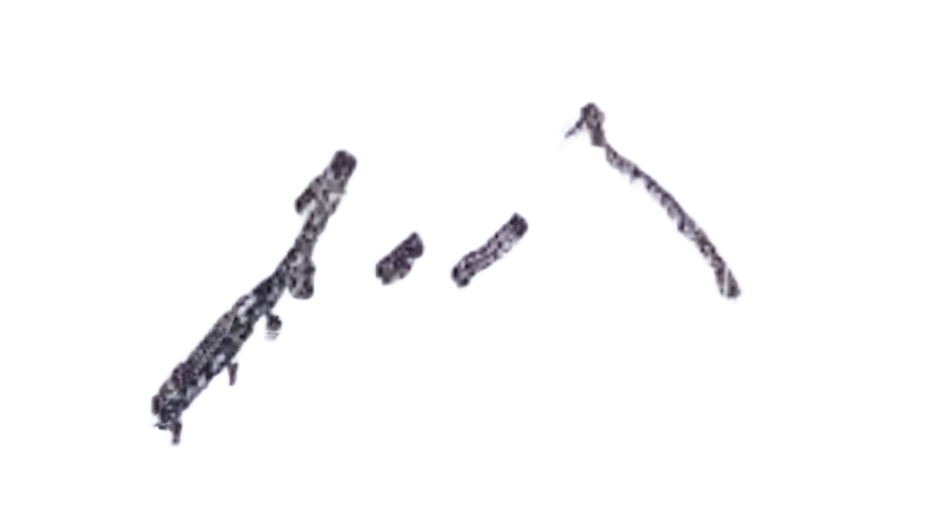
- Signature
- Website: Government website

Jejomar "Jojo" Cabauatan Binay Sr. (born Jesus Jose Cabauatan Binay; November 11, 1942) is a Filipino lawyer, politician and human rights activist who served as the 13th vice president of the Philippines from 2010 to 2016, under President Benigno Aquino III.

Binay was appointed by President Corazon Aquino as officer-in-charge (OIC) of Makati as mayor from 1986 to 1987. After his tenure, he became the appointed OIC governor of Metro Manila from 1987 to 1988 before being elected as mayor of Makati in 1988 and served until 2010, serving six terms as mayor. Concurrently, he was also the chairman of the Metropolitan Manila Development Authority (MMDA) from 1990 to 1991. On October 21, 2009 it was announced that Binay would seek the vice-presidency as the running mate of former president Joseph Estrada. Though the latter lost to Benigno Aquino III, Binay won the vice presidency, garnering 41.65% of the vote cast, with runner-up Mar Roxas receiving 39.58%. During his time as vice president of the Philippines, he was appointed chairman of the Housing and Urban Development Coordinating Council and as presidential adviser on overseas Filipino workers but resigned on June 22, 2015, due to differences with President Benigno Aquino and some of his cabinet members.

Binay ran and failed to secure a senate position in the 2022 general elections, garnering over 13 million votes and placing thirteenth on the vote list.

== Early life ==
Jejomar Binay was born in Paco, Manila. The name "Jejomar" is a portmanteau of Jesus, Joseph, and Mary. He is the younger of two children of Diego "Jego" Medrano Binay, a librarian from Bauan, Batangas, and Lourdes Gatan Cabauatan, a school teacher from Cabagan, Isabela. He had an older sibling who died before he was born, making him the only one who survived childhood. After being orphaned at the age of nine, he was adopted by his uncle, Ponciano Binay.

== Education ==
Binay finished basic education at the Philippine Normal College Training Department and graduated from the University of the Philippines Preparatory School.

He went to the University of the Philippines Diliman (UP) for college and graduated in 1962 with a degree in political science. While studying at UP, he became member of the Alpha Phi Omega fraternity. He continued on to the UP College of Law and also worked as a clerk at the Insular Life at the same time. He would graduate in 1967 and passed the bar examinations in 1968. He got a master's degree from the University of Santo Tomas in 1980 and a master's degree in National Security Administration from the National Defense College of the Philippines. He took up Strategic Economic Program in the Center for Research and Communication. He enrolled in a Non-Resident and General Staff Course at the Command and General Staff College, AFP and joined the seniors executive fellow program at the John F. Kennedy School of Government in Harvard University.

In 1993, he received a diploma in Land Use Program from the University of the Philippines. In 1996, he finished the Top Management Program at the Asian Institute of Management in Bali, Indonesia. He also took up the Joint Services and Command Staff course in the AFP. He also has a master's degree in management at the Philippine Christian University and a diploma in Environmental and Natural Resources Management from the University of the Philippines Open University.

== Legal career and political activism ==
Binay entered into legal aid by starting the Lupon ng mga Manananggol ng Bayan (LUMABAN) in 1970 during the First Quarter Storm. In 1973, during the onset of Marcos Sr. dictatorship, Binay was imprisoned in 1973 at the Ipil Reception Center (present-day Fort Bonifacio). Upon his release, Binay entered the Free Legal Assistance Group (FLAG) led by Jose W. Diokno, and became chairman of its Metro Manila Chapter.

In 1980, Binay, Augusto "Bobbit" Sanchez, Rene Saguisag, Fulgencio Factoran, Lorenzo Tañada, Joker Arroyo, and other human rights lawyers created the Movement for Brotherhood, Integrity and Nationalism, Inc. (MABINI).

== Political career ==
=== Mayor of Makati ===
==== First and second stints (1986–1998) ====
On February 27, 1986, Binay became one of President Corazon Aquino’s first appointed local officials after Mayor Nemesio Yabut died while in office during the EDSA Revolution. He was later appointed as the OIC governor of Metro Manila, serving from 1987 to 1988, when he resigned to focus on his mayoralty campaign in Makati. He was elected in his own right on January 18, 1988, and was reelected on May 11, 1992, and on May 8, 1995. Binay was known as the first city mayor of Makati, as the municipality became a highly urbanized city on February 4, 1995.

He joined pro-democracy forces in preventing the mutinies against the Aquino administration from being successful. His active role in the defense of the Constitution earned him the nickname "Rambotito" (or little Rambo, after the screen hero), the Outstanding Achievement Medal and a special commendation from Aquino. He became term-limited in 1998 and his position was kept by his wife Elenita.

==== Third stint (2001–2010) ====
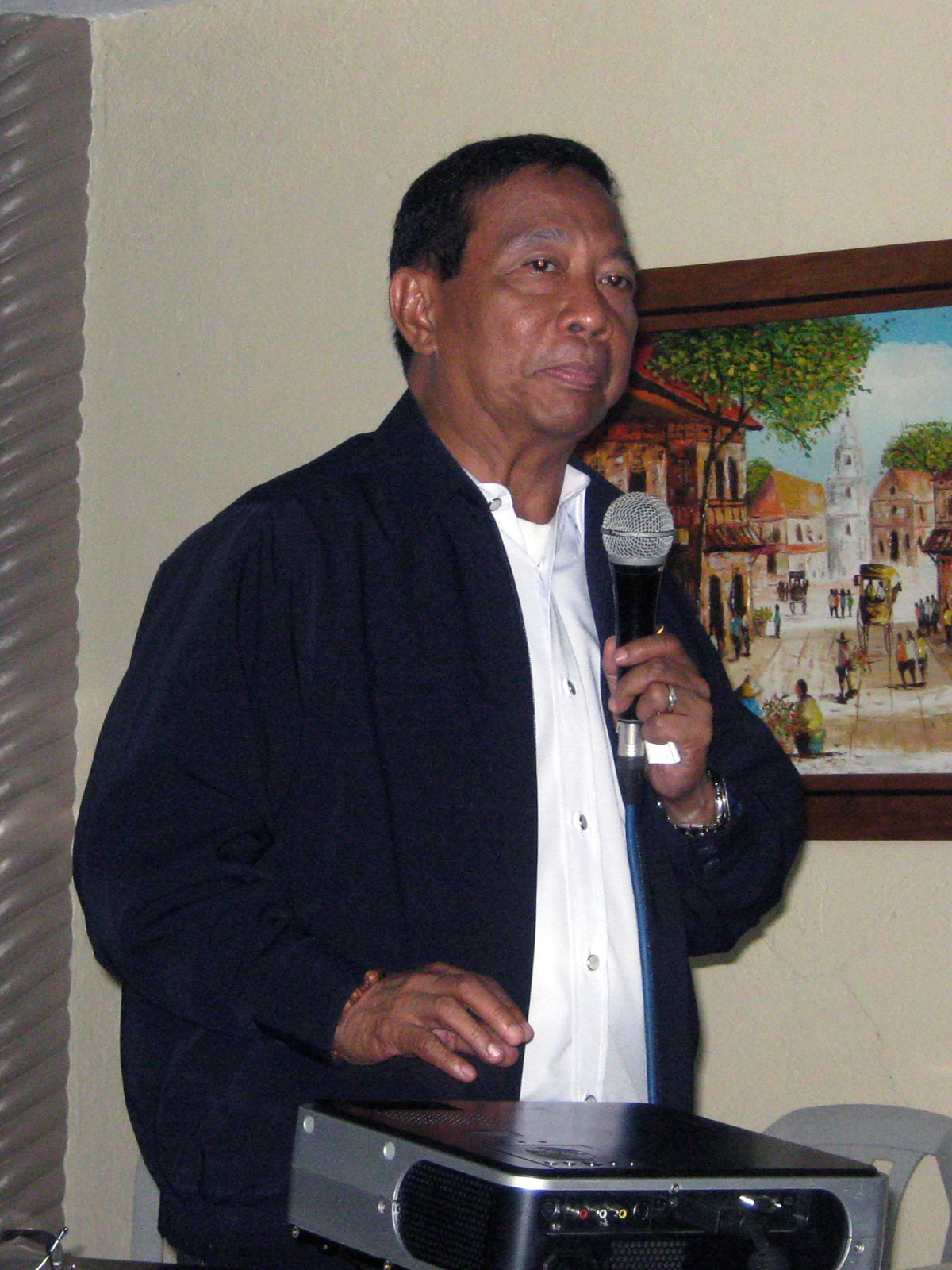
Then Makati Mayor Binay at a meeting of political leaders in Valencia, Negros Oriental in September 2009.

Following the May 14, 2001 election, Binay reclaimed his post as mayor of Makati, winning over actor, television host, and then-vice mayor Edu Manzano in a landslide victory and became a critic of President Gloria Macapagal Arroyo. In 2004, he became the general campaign manager of Fernando Poe Jr.'s unsuccessful presidential bid and served as a member of the executive committee of the Koalisyon ng Nagkakaisang Pilipino, the political coalition that backed Poe. He won his fifth term on May 10, 2004, by a large margin against 1st district councilor Oscar Ibay. He ran for his sixth and last term as mayor on May 14, 2007, and won again by a significant margin beating incumbent senator and actor Lito Lapid. His margin over Lapid was then considered as the largest margin in a local election in Makati.

In October 2006, the Department of the Interior and Local Government (DILG) issued a suspension order against Binay, Vice Mayor Ernesto Mercado, and all members of the city council following an accusation of 'ghost employees' on the city payroll by former vice mayor Roberto Brillante, a political rival. Refusing to cooperate with the suspension order, Binay barricaded himself inside the Makati City Hall. Among those who expressed support were former president Corazon Aquino, actress Susan Roces (widow of Fernando Poe Jr.), and several Catholic bishops. After a three-day stand-off, the Court of Appeals issued a temporary restraining order. Before it lapsed, the court issued an injunction order, thereby preventing the Office of the President from enforcing its suspension order until the case was resolved.

Binay – together with his wife, Elenita, and nine others – was vindicated by the courts in a graft case filed by the Office of the Ombudsman over allegations of overpricing in the purchase of office furniture. Allegedly, he had irregular purchases worth ₱232 million from the years 1991–2006. The case was also filed by Brillante, who at that time was leading in Makati a Palace-supported signature campaign to amend the Constitution. The Sandiganbayan Third Division dismissed the graft case filed against him and his six co-accused for lack of factual basis even prior to Binay's arraignment. Critics claimed the suspension order was intended to distract attention from the government's own scandals.

On May 2, 2007, the Bureau of Internal Revenue (BIR) froze all bank accounts of the city government of Makati and the personal accounts of Mayor Binay and Vice Mayor Mercado. The BIR issued the order after it said the city still owed the BIR ₱1.1 billion in withholding taxes of city employees from 1999 to 2002. BIR revenue officer Roberto Baquiran signed and issued the warrant of garnishment against the bank accounts that belonged to Binay, Mercado, the city government and the city's treasurer and accountant.

The city government protested the garnishment order, saying the city had already paid ₱200 million to the BIR as part of a settlement agreement agreed to by Finance Secretary Margarito Teves and former BIR chief Jose Buñag. The city government also said the order was flawed since Baquiran had no authority to issue writs of garnishment and freezing the personal accounts of Binay and Mercado were also unlawful. Ordered by the Court of Tax Appeals (CTA), Binay was made to pay the deficiency in taxes amounting to more than ₱1.1 billion to the BIR, in December 2009.

The garnishment orders were eventually lifted by Malacañang Palace, but not until after Binay slammed the move as politically motivated and patently illegal.

Binay's camp claimed and accused President Arroyo of political harassment. Because of this, as per the DILG, a suspension order was served against Binay over alleged corruption. The latter said that the tax obligations were already settled between the BIR and the Makati city government.

Barely a week before the local elections, the Ombudsman suspended Binay based on allegations made by a local candidate allied with Malacañang; it would be revealed that the charges were supported by falsified statements. In a repeat of the October 2006 incident, heavily armed policemen barged into the city hall after office hours, forcibly opening the offices and occupying the building. Binay confronted police officials and representatives of the DILG, while hundreds of supporters once again swarmed the city hall quadrangle to show their support.

The suspension order generated national media attention, and prompted even administration senatorial candidates to protest publicly, saying the action further undermined their chances in the elections. Despite the controversy of this tax liability issue, Binay still won the position of vice president in 2010 by a landslide victory.

=== Vice presidency (2010–2016) ===
Binay taking oath of office as Vice President of the Philippines in 2010.

Vice Presidential styles of Jejomar Binay
- Reference style: His Excellency, The Honorable
- Spoken style: Your Excellency
- Alternative style: Mr. Vice President

Binay initially announced his bid for the presidency for the 2010 elections during his 66th birthday celebration at the Makati City Hall on November 11, 2008, but abandoned his bid to give way to the comeback bid of former president Joseph Estrada. He eventually became Estrada's running mate and ran under the banner of PDP–Laban.

Binay initially showed a relatively poor performance in public opinion polls, trailing behind senators Loren Legarda and Mar Roxas, but Binay's standings improved as the elections approached, overtaking Legarda and tying with Roxas in the final survey conducted. He went on to defeat Roxas in the election.

During the campaign, a photo of Binay with his rumored mistress leaked online. Though he admitted to having an extramarital affair, Binay said that the leaked photo was part of "black propaganda" against him, because of his high ratings in a vice presidential survey conducted prior to the leaking of the photo. The alleged "black propaganda" device had little to no effect on the campaign of Binay, who closed the gap of votes between him and leading vice presidential candidate, Mar Roxas, in a survey. Despite the issue, Binay won the election.

Binay took his oath as vice president on June 30, 2010, becoming the first local government official to do so. He is also the oldest Filipino to be elected vice president at the age of 67 and the second overall after Teofisto Guingona Jr., who, at age 72, was appointed vice president by Gloria Macapagal Arroyo.

Binay was appointed chairman of the Housing Urban Development Coordinating Council (HUDCC) by President Noynoy Aquino, the same position held by his predecessor, Vice President Noli de Castro, and Presidential Adviser for Overseas Filipino Workers (Presidential Adviser for OFW Concerns). During this time, Binay was assigned to lead "Task Force OFW", which helped Overseas Filipino Workers who were maltreated by their employers to return to the Philippines with the assistance of the government.

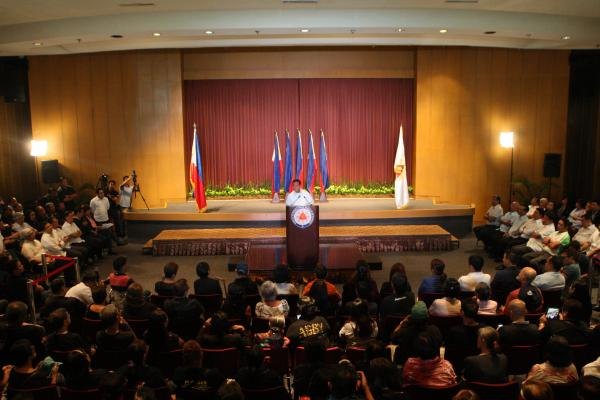
Binay delivering a speech as vice president

==== Presidential campaign ====
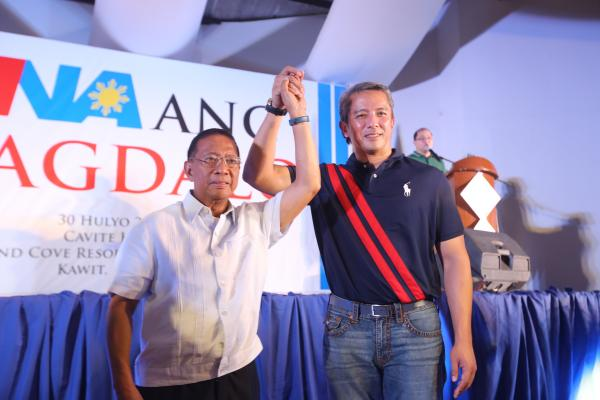
Binay with Cavite Governor Jonvic Remulla during the signing of a coalition agreement between the United Nationalist Alliance and Partido Magdalo.

Initially, Binay polled highly among expected presidential candidates for the 2016 Philippine general election. However, in a Pulse Asia survey released in September 2015, he placed third after senators Grace Poe and Mar Roxas, the latter of whom was the ruling Liberal Party's presidential candidate. Binay's trust rating had also dropped by 18%.

Speculation as to who Binay's running mate for 2016 saw fingers pointed in many directions, including the likes of PLDT Chairman Manuel V. Pangilinan, Senator Jinggoy Estrada, Rep. Manny Pacquiao, Nacionalista Party President Manny Villar, and Batangas Governor Vilma Santos. However, his running mate was later revealed to be Senator Gringo Honasan, who was also the vice president of the United Nationalist Alliance.

===== Platform =====
Binay disclosed his platform for his 2016 presidential bid during his speech to the Integrated Bar of the Philippines in Cebu City on March 20, 2015.

He aimed to improve the situation in state colleges and universities, public health hospitals and clinics, police stations, and mass housing. He also promised an increase in both salaries and benefits of public school teachers and health workers, members of the police force, and other public servants. As part of his plans, he included a redesigning and re-engineering of the transportation system of the country, as well as prioritizing the building of more infrastructure and the creation of more jobs. He proposed to change the constitution to boost the economy, and speed up the country's development.

In early July of the same year, Binay expressed UNA's (his party list) platform for 2016 in a speech:

Ang sigaw ng UNA at ng taumbayan sawa na tayo sa kahirapan, sawa na tayo sa kawalan ng hanapbuhay, sawa na tayo sa kriminalidad at ilegal na droga. Sawa na tayo sa kakulangan ng basic services... hirap na tayo sa manhid at palpak na pamahalaan,

What UNA and the citizens are expressing is that we're tired of poverty, we're tired of unemployment, we're tired of criminals and illegal drugs. We're tired of the lack of basic services...we're struggling under a numb and failed government,

== Post-vice presidency (2016–present) ==
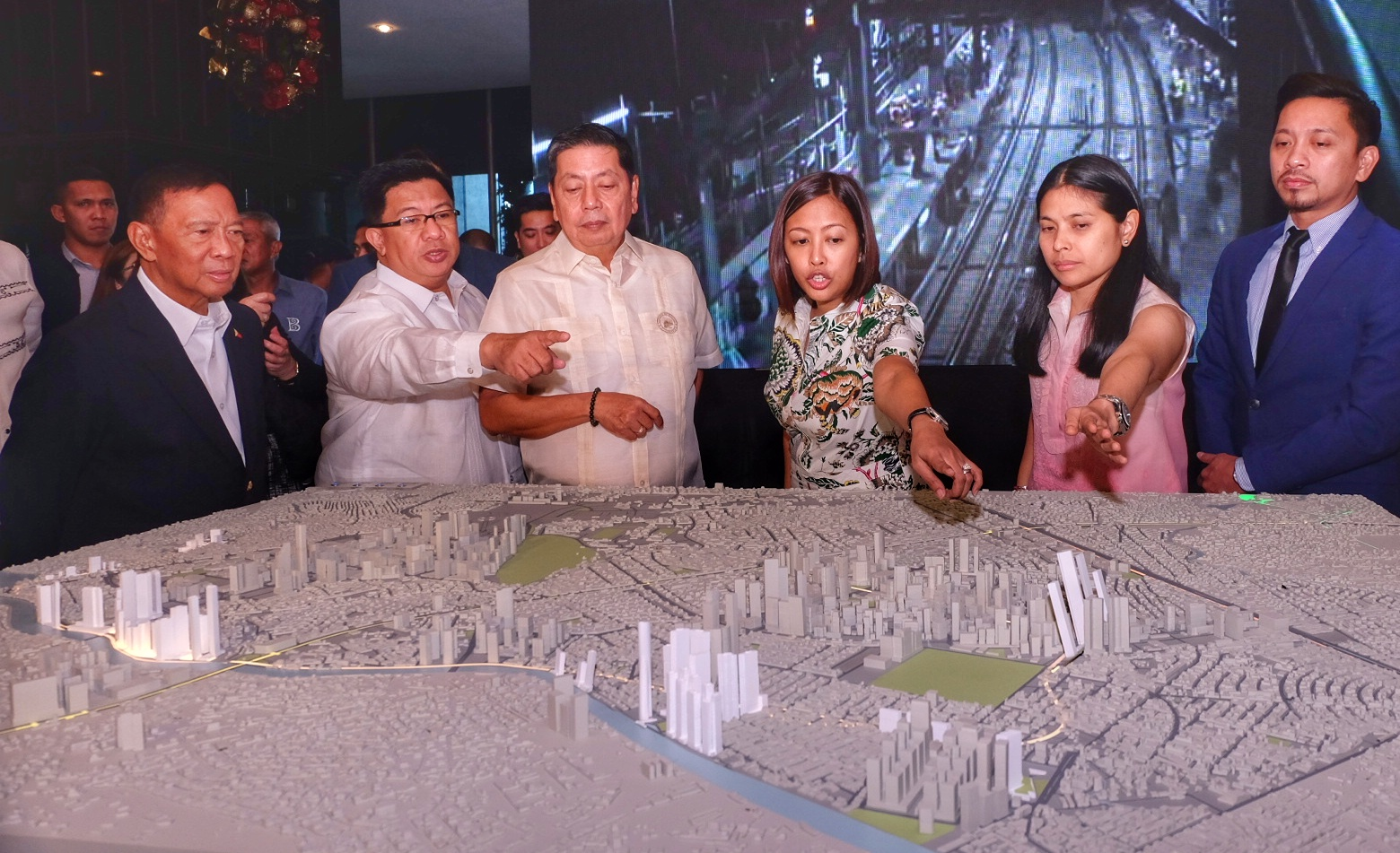
Former Vice President Binay (left), Makati Mayor Abigail Binay (third from right), and Vice Mayor Monique Lagdameo (second from right) viewing the scale model of the planned Makati City Subway project during the unveiling ceremony at the Makati City Hall on December 12, 2018

Binay lost the 2016 presidential election to Davao City Mayor Rodrigo Duterte. He called Duterte three days after the election to congratulate him. Later, in 2017, Binay became the founding dean of the University of Makati College of Law. In 2019, Binay ran in the congressional election in Makati's 1st district, but lost to former acting mayor Kid Peña.

Binay had also voiced out in political issues during the Duterte administration. He supported ABS-CBN amidst its franchise renewal controversy. He also stands against the controversial Anti-Terrorism Act of 2020. He has criticized the Duterte administration for failing to manage the COVID-19 pandemic situation in the Philippines. He also said that lawyers are more scared under Duterte than they were under former President Ferdinand Marcos.

=== 2022 senatorial bid ===
On July 24, 2021, Senate President Vicente Sotto III said that Binay would be running for a senatorial seat in 2022. Binay was named to the senatorial slate of Sotto's running mate for president, Senator Panfilo Lacson, as well as to the MP3 Alliance and TRoPa of presidential aspirants Manny Pacquiao and Leni Robredo, respectively, as a guest candidate. His Senate bid was also endorsed by vice presidential aspirant Sara Duterte, former President Gloria Macapagal Arroyo, the Makabayan bloc, Iglesia ni Cristo, and the Council of Bishops of the United Church of Christ in the Philippines. However, he lost in his bid, placing 13th out of the 12 seats up for election with more than 13 million votes.

=== Acquittals ===
In December 2024, the Sandiganbayan granted the demurrer and acquitted Binay, his son Jejomar Binay Jr. and all the accused in the Makati Science High School case. In August 2025, it also acquitted the elder Binay of multiple charges—one count of malversation of public funds, four counts of graft, and nine counts of falsification of public documents—related to the construction of the allegedly overpriced Makati City Hall Building II (Parking Building) that began during his mayoral term.

=== 2025 Makati local elections ===
Binay (right) and his daughter Nancy (left) in 2025

In 2025, Binay endorsed the Makati mayoralty bid of his daughter Nancy, who ran against his son-in-law Luis Campos, the husband of his other daughter, outgoing Mayor Abigail Binay. Nancy eventually won the race.

== Personal life ==
Binay is married to Dr. Elenita Sombillo, who also served as Mayor of Makati from 1998 to 2001. They have five children:

- Maria Lourdes Nancy (Nancy, born May 12, 1973), married to Jose Benjamin Angeles, with four children
- Mar-len Abigail (Abby, born December 12, 1975), married to Luis Jose Angel Campos Jr., with one child (Martina)
- Jejomar Erwin Jr. (Junjun, born July 12, 1977), married to Patricia Sandejas, previously a widower of Kennely Ann Lacia, with four children (Jejomarie Alexi, Maria Isabel, Jejomar III, and Maria Kennely)
- Marita Angeline (Anne, born May 12, 1979), married to Don Alcantara, with four children
- Joanna Marie Blanca (born November 22, 1988)

== Honors and awards ==
In 2018, the Human Rights Victims' Claims Board (HRVCB) formally recognized Binay as a motu proprio victim of human rights violations committed under the Marcos Sr. dictatorship.

=== Recognition ===
- Outstanding Award, Metro Manila Development Authority (MMDA), 1992
- Award on the Luzon Campaign Medal, 1992
- Special Presidential Award for Service, 2002
- Leadership Award, Presidential Citation, 2002
- Most Outstanding City Mayor of Makati and Consumers Advocate Award, 2003
- University of the Philippines Oblation Run Award Best in Sports Wear, 2004
- Centennial Medal of Honor, 2005
- Outstanding Public Official and Great Achiever, 2005
- World Mayor Award granted by London-based City Mayors, 2006
- Bronze Wolf, the only distinction of the World Organization of the Scout Movement, awarded by the World Scout Committee for exceptional services to world Scouting, 2018

=== Honorary degree ===
- Doctor of Public Administration, Polytechnic University of the Philippines, 1992

== Notes ==
Political offices
Preceded by Nemesio Yabut	Mayor of Makati; 1986–1987	Succeeded by Sergio Santos; Acting
Preceded by Joey Lina; Acting	Governor of Metro Manila; Acting; 1987–1988	Succeeded by Elfren Cruz; Acting
Preceded by Sergio Santos; Acting	Mayor of Makati; 1988–1998	Succeeded by Elenita Binay
New office	Chairman of the Metropolitan Manila Development Authority; 1990–1991	Succeeded by Ignacio Bunye
Preceded by Prospero Oreta	Chairman of the Metropolitan Manila Development Authority; 1998–2001	Succeeded by Benjamin Abalos
Preceded by Elenita Binay	Mayor of Makati; 2001–2010	Succeeded by Jejomar Binay Jr.
Preceded by Noli de Castro	Vice President of the Philippines; 2010–2016	Succeeded by Leni Robredo
Preceded by Noli de Castro	Chairman of Housing and Urban Development Coordinating Council; 2010–2015	Succeeded by Chito Cruz
Party political offices
Preceded by Aquilino Pimentel Jr.	Chairman of PDP–Laban; 2010–2014	Succeeded by Ismael Sueno
Preceded by Joseph Estrada	Chairman of UNA; 2015–2016	Succeeded by Nancy Binay
Vacant Title last held by Aquilino Pimentel Jr.	PDP–Laban nominee for Vice President of the Philippines; 2010	Most recent
First	UNA nominee for President of the Philippines; 2016	Most recent
Order of precedence
Preceded by Noli de Castro as Former Vice President	Order of Precedence of the Philippines (Ceremonial) as Former Vice President	Succeeded by Leni Robredo as Former Vice President
