= Philippine Sports Training Center =

Proposed sports complex in the Philippines

- Full name: Philippine Sports Training Center
- Owner: Philippine Sports Commission
- Facilities: Various (see below)

The Philippine Sports Training Center (PSTC) is a proposed sports complex in the Philippines. It will be owned by the Philippine Sports Commission and will be the official training facility for members of the Philippine national teams and national training pool.

Its construction is mandated by the Republic Act No. 11214 also known as Philippine Sports Training Center Act.

The PSTC is yet to be built. A groundbreaking ceremony was held for the construction of the PSTC in Bagac, Bataan in May 2022 but it was later shelved by August 2023.

== Legislation ==
The construction of the Philippine Sports Training Center was proposed through legislation. Senate Bill No. 1716, or the Philippine Amateur Sports Training Center Act was authored a sponsored by Senator and professional boxer Manny Pacquiao with the bill also co-sponsored by Senator Sonny Angara. On November 28, 2018, the Bicameral Conference Committee approved the bill after consolidating it with its version filed in the House of Representatives. A law leading to the construction of the facility, Republic Act No. 11214 also known as Philippine Sports Training Center Act, was signed into law by President Rodrigo Duterte on February 14, 2019.

== Proposed sites ==
=== Rosales, Pampanga ===
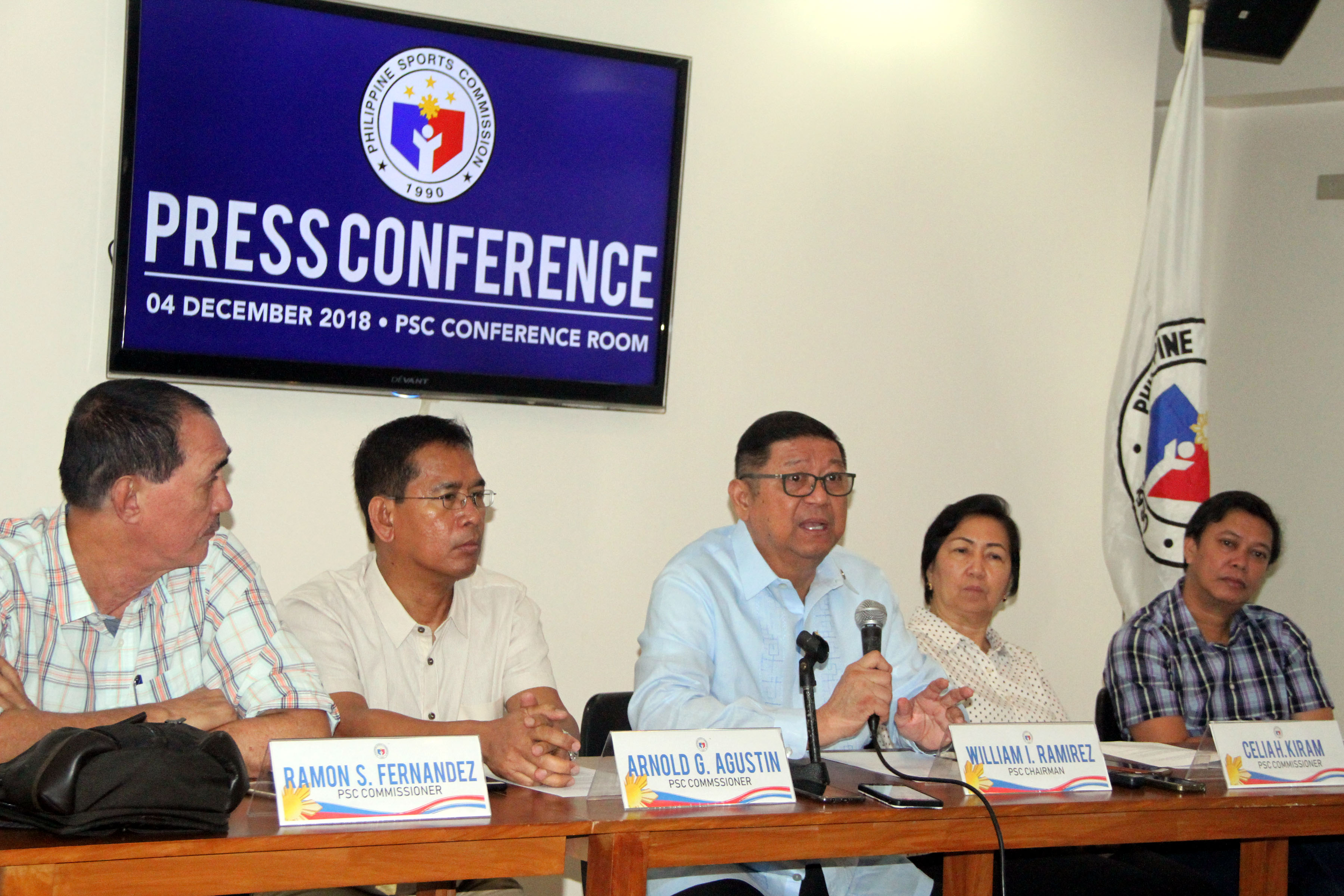
Philippine Sports Commission chairman Butch Ramirez discusses about the construction of the training center during a press conference held on December 4, 2018.

The Philippine Sports Commission (PSC) announced on December 4, 2018, that the Philippine Sports Training Center will be primarily built in Rosales, Pangasinan. It was also announced while Rosales will serve as the main hub of the center, some of the facilities will be hosted in the bordering province of Tarlac. The site was dropped in favor of Bataan.

=== Bagac, Bataan ===
By 2021, the proposed location for the sports complex has been changed, with the facility to be built in the town of Bagac in Bataan province instead of Pangasinan. The Bataan provincial government donated a 25 hectares (62 acres) property in the town for the construction of the PSTC.

Under the provisions of the deed of donation, signed during a ceremony in Mariveles, is that the infrastructure of the PTSC should be completed by December 31, 2025. ₱3.5 billion will be appropriated and included in the General Appropriations Act (GAA) for the construction of the PSTC. Any other funds will be drawn from the budget allocated to specifically the Philippine Sports Commission in the GAA.

The construction of an access road to the PTSC began in May 2022. President Rodrigo Duterte led the groundbreaking ceremony for the sports complex on June 17, 2022

However in August 2023, the plan to build on the PSTC in Bagac was reportedly shelved due to majority of the national sports associations not keen on a facility far from Metro Manila.

In August 2023, the PSC stated that there are seven local government units expressed interest hosting the PSTC.

== Future plans ==
The board of the PSC under the chairmanship of Patrick Gregorio approved an Implementing Rules and Regulations (IRR) for the Republic Act 11214 and has committed to the construction of the PSTC.

== Facilities ==
As per law the Philippine Sports Training Center are to have the following facilities:

Sports training venues

- Baseball field
- Beach volleyball courts
- Bowling center
- Covered swimming and diving pool
- Football field
- Gymnastics center
- Multi-purpose gymnasium
- Multi-purpose field
  - Archery range
  - BMX track
  - Lawn balls and petanque field
  - Rugby pitch
  - Skeet and trap range
  - Softball field
- Track and field oval
- Lawn tennis courts
- Velodrome

Other facilities

- Administration building
- Athletes' and coaches' dormitory
- Conference and seminar hall
- Guests' villas
- Sports science building
- Mess hall
- Recreation hall
- Library
- Weight training building
- School buildings
- Medical center
- Worship and meditation room

== See also ==
- New Clark City Sports Hub
- PFF National Training Centre
- Philippine Sports Institute
