= 2023 FIBA Basketball World Cup bids =

The bidding process for choosing the hosts of the 2023 FIBA Basketball World Cup by the International Basketball Federation (FIBA) began in 2016. Originally, national federations are allowed to bid for both the 2019 and 2023 editions, but on 16 March 2015, FIBA announced the 2019 edition will be held in Asia, which was then awarded to China on 7 August 2015. The 2023 Basketball World Cup will be held in three Asian countries; Philippines, Indonesia, and Japan. It will be the first Basketball World Cup to be held in multiple countries and the second straight World Cup to be staged in Asia. The decision was announced during FIBA's year-end meeting on 9 December 2017. The 2023 FIBA Basketball World Cup ran from 25 August – 10 September.

== Calendar ==
Date	Event	Phase
7 June 2016	Approval the bidding process during a FIBA Executive Committee meeting	
31 August 2016	Deadline to confirm interest for countries wishing to be taken into consideration	
1–2 November 2016	FIBA bidding workshop on hosting 2023 FIBA Basketball World Cup for all interested nations	Applicant Phase
1 June 2017	FIBA confirmed shortlist of candidates	Applicant Phase
31 August 2017	Candidature Files are to be submitted to FIBA	Candidate Phase
9 December 2017	FIBA awarding and announcing the 2023 FIBA Basketball World Cup hosts as per decision to be made by Central Board	Candidate Phase

== Background ==
On 7 June 2016, FIBA approved the bidding process for the 2023 FIBA Basketball World Cup.

Joint bids by member federations was approved by the FIBA Central Board starting from the 2023 edition and there is no restriction for a country from the confederation which hosted the previous edition (China of FIBA Asia) to bid for the World Cup hosting rights.

On 1–2 November 2016, FIBA organized a bidding workshop on the 2023 FIBA Basketball World Cup and its bidding process. On 1 June 2017, FIBA confirmed the list of candidates for the hosting of the World Cup. Solo bidders Russia and Turkey ended their bids, leaving joint bids of Philippines-Japan-Indonesia and Argentina-Uruguay left in the race.

After Philippines-Japan-Indonesia won the bid. Argentina-Uruguay may have fallen short, later they withdrawn the bid for 2027.

== Candidate countries ==
Country(s)	National Federation(s)
Philippines Japan Indonesia	Samahang Basketbol ng Pilipinas Japan Basketball Association Indonesian Basketball Association
Main article: Philippine–Japanese–Indonesian bid for the 2023 FIBA Basketball World Cup On 28 January 2017, the Philippines along with Indonesia submitted a joint bid to FIBA. Both countries proposed to hold group stage matches while the Philippines was proposed as the sole host country of the final knockout phase. The Philippines hosted the 1978 FIBA World Championship, three editions of the FIBA Asia Championship (1960, 1973, 2013), and also hosted one of the 2016 FIBA Olympic Qualifying Tournaments. Indonesia, meanwhile, had hosted the 1993 ABC Championship. The President of the Philippine Basketball Federation (SBP) Al Panlilio announced on 6 February 2017 that Japan was invited to join the Philippine-Indonesian bid. After the FIBA Board Meeting in May 2017 several media reported that Japan has joined the Philippine-Indonesian bid. Japan previously hosted the 2006 World Championship and 2007 Asia Championship.
Argentina Uruguay	Argentine Basketball Federation Uruguayan Basketball Federation
Main article: Argentina–Uruguay bid for the 2023 FIBA Basketball World Cup Argentina and Uruguay made a bid to host 2023 FIBA World Cup. Argentina has hosted the 1950 and 1990 FIBA World Cup, and the FIBA Americas Championship in 1995, 2001 and 2011. Uruguay has hosted the 1967 FIBA World Championship, and 1988 and 1997 Tournament of the Americas. Both countries hosted together with Colombia the 2017 FIBA AmeriCup.

== Withdrawn candidate countries ==
Russia	Russian Basketball Federation
Russian sports minister Vitaly Mutko announced on 20 April 2015 that he is in talks with the governing body of basketball for the country to bid to host the 2023 World Cup. However on 22 November 2017, Russia ended their bid for the hosting rights due to negative attitude and criticism.
Turkey	Turkish Basketball Federation
Turkey made a bid to host the 2023 FIBA World Cup. Turkey hosted the 2010 FIBA World Championship and Eurobasket 2001 and 2017. On 20 November 2017, Turkey ended its bid to host the tournament due to focus on development for basketball.

=== Earlier bidding workshop participants ===
The following National Federations not bidding to host the 2023 FIBA World Cup participated in a workshop held by FIBA on 1–2 November 2016 on the Basketball World Cup 2023 bidding process:

- Australia
- Germany
- Hong Kong
- Israel
- Poland
- Serbia

=== Earlier interested in bidding ===
- Qatar

Qatar was reported to have entered a bid when FIBA asked to bid for the 2019 and 2023 FIBA Basketball World Cups and specified that it was the only nation interested solely for 2023. They hosted the 2005 FIBA Asia Championship. However, Qatar was not present at the FIBA bidding workshop for the 2023 FIBA Basketball World Cup. Qatar was awarded the 2027 FIBA Basketball World Cup on 28 April 2023.

== Selection ==
The FIBA Central Board decided on the winning bid on 9 December 2017, during its year-end meeting in Mies, Switzerland.
