= 2027 FIBA Basketball World Cup bids =

The bidding process for choosing the hosts of the 2027 FIBA Basketball World Cup by the International Basketball Federation (FIBA) began in 2018. Originally, national federations were allowed to bid for both the 2023 and 2027 editions, but on 24 May 2018, Argentina and Uruguay withdrawn their joint bid, leaving bid process wide open. The 2027 Basketball World Cup will be held in Qatar. It will be the first Basketball World Cup to be held in the Arab World and the third straight World Cup to be staged in Asia. The decision was announced during FIBA's Central Board meeting ahead the final draw for the 2023 edition on 28 April 2023. 2027 FIBA Basketball World Cup starts from 27 August – 12 September.

== Calendar ==
Date	Event	Phase
24 May 2018	Approval the bidding process during a FIBA Executive Committee meeting.	
28 April 2023	FIBA awarding and announcing the 2027 FIBA Basketball World Cup hosts as per decision to be made by Central Board	

== Background ==
On 24 May 2018, FIBA approved the bidding process for the 2027 FIBA Basketball World Cup.

The process deadline was unknown after Argentina-Uruguay withdrawn their bid.

No other bid join the process, leaving 2027 bid uncertain, however Qatar became the only candidate to have join after Philippines-Japan-Indonesia won the bid. Argentina-Uruguay may have fallen short, later they withdrawn the bid for 2027.

Other undisclosed countries placed their bids.

== Candidate countries ==
Country(s)	National Federation(s)
Qatar	Qatar Basketball Federation
Main article: Qatari bid for the 2027 FIBA Basketball World Cup Qatar were previously interested of hosting the 2019 and 2023 editions. In August 2022, Qatar submitted the bid to FIBA. The Middle Eastern nation proposed to hold group stage matches and the final knockout phase. Qatar hosted the 2005 FIBA Asia Championship and also hosted 2006 Asian Games Men's Basketball tournament.

== Withdrawn candidate countries ==
Argentina Uruguay	Argentine Basketball Federation Uruguayan Basketball Federation
Main article: Argentina–Uruguay bid for the 2023 FIBA Basketball World Cup Argentina and Uruguay made a bid to host 2023 FIBA World Cup. Argentina has hosted the 1950 and 1990 FIBA World Cup, and the FIBA Americas Championship in 1995, 2001 and 2011. Uruguay has hosted the 1967 FIBA World Championship, and 1988 and 1997 Tournament of the Americas. Both countries hosted together with Colombia the 2017 FIBA AmeriCup. Previously bid for the 2023 edition, but lost out to the Philippines, Japan and Indonesia. After losing the 2023 edition, they were given a chance to make an unopposed bid by FIBA for the 2027 edition. However on 24 May 2018, they decided not to pursue a bid.

== Selection ==
The FIBA Central Board decided on the winning bid on 28 May 2023, during its meeting ahead of the final draw of the 2023 edition in Manila, Philippines.
