= 2019 FIBA Basketball World Cup bids =

The bidding process for the 2019 FIBA Basketball World Cup by the International Basketball Federation (FIBA) concluded on 7 August 2015, with China announced as hosts of the 2019 FIBA World Cup. The other candidate country was the Philippines.

All FIBA national federations are allowed to bid for the 2019 Basketball World Cup, but FIBA also added that a federation can bid on both the 2019 and 2023 World Cups or bid only for 2023 and award hosts for events at the same time.

== Bidding calendar ==
On 16 April 2014, in a press release, FIBA announced the bidding calendar for the 2019 and/or 2023 Basketball World Cup.

- Expression of interest phase
  - April 2014 – Request for Expression of Interest issued to National Federations
  - 9 June 2014 – Deadline for return of the Expression of Interest to FIBA
- Applicant phase
  - August 2014 – Deadline for the Observer Programme at the 2014 FIBA Basketball World Cup
  - September 2014 – Observer Programme on the 2014 FIBA Basketball World Cup in Spain
  - October 2014 – Deadline for submission of the bid application questionnaire
- Candidate phase
  - November 2014 – Announcement of the candidate nations by FIBA
  - December 2014 – Workshop for Candidates at Geneva, Switzerland
  - January–February 2015 – On-site inspection visits
  - April 2015 – Deadline of the submission of final candidature files
  - 7 August 2015 – Final bid presentations and announcement of the host nation by the FIBA Central Board in Tokyo.

== Candidate countries ==
On 16 March 2015, FIBA announced that its executive committee has decided that the 2019 World Cup would be held in Asia, putting the bids of China and the Philippines as the final candidates in the running as hosts.

Country	National Federation
Philippines	Samahang Basketbol ng Pilipinas
Main article: Philippine bid for the 2019 FIBA Basketball World Cup The Philippines had successfully hosted the 1978 FIBA World Championship and three FIBA Asia Championships (1960, 1973 and 2013).
China	Chinese Basketball Association
Main article: Chinese bid for the 2019 FIBA Basketball World Cup China hosted the 2015 FIBA Asia Championship, and also hosted four previous Asian championships this century.

Bids from Germany, Turkey and Qatar were moved for the 2023 FIBA Basketball World Cup. Those from France, Lithuania, Russia, Venezuela, and Mexico were disregarded.

== Selection ==
After the final bid presentation conducted by the two candidate countries in Tokyo, Japan on 7 August 2015. The FIBA Central Board decided on the hosts of the 2019 tournament and announced China as hosts of the tournament on the same day. 14 voted for China while 7 voted for the Philippines for the right to host the tournament.

2019 FIBA World Cup host vote results
Country	Vote
China	14
Philippines	7
Total Votes	21
