= National Sports Museum (Philippines) =

- Former name: Philippine Sports Museum
- Established: 2008
- Location: Rizal Memorial Sports Complex, Manila (former); PhilSports Complex, Pasig, Metro Manila, Philippines (since 2025)
- Type: Sports museum
- Owner: Philippine Sports Commission

The National Sports Museum is a museum in Pasig, Metro Manila, Philippines ran by the Philippine Sports Commission.

== History ==
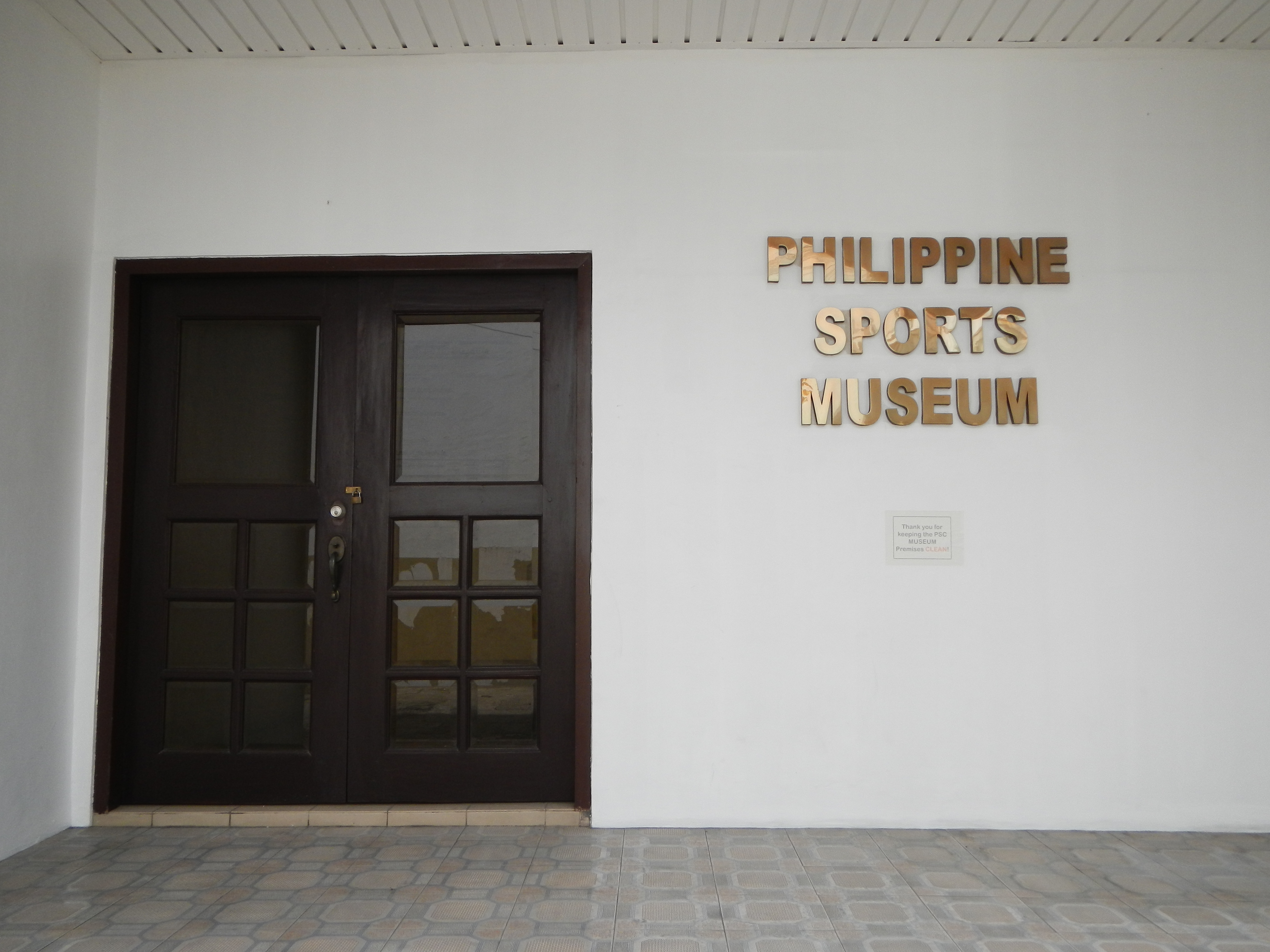
Philippine Sports Museum entrance. 2013

The Philippine Sports Museum (PSM) started from the idea of former Philippine Sports Commission (PSC) chairman Eric Buhain in 2002. It started as a travel exhibit by the PSC during chairman Butch Ramirez's term with the collection being displayed during PSC sanctioned tournaments and events.

The project was converted to a museum, opening as the PSM in 2008 within the Rizal Memorial Sports Complex in Manila. The museum is an initiative of the Philippine Sports Commission during the first tenure of Butch Ramirez from 2005 to 2008.

The PSM closed sometime later, before it was reopened in April 2013.

The museum was later relocated to the PhilSports Complex. It was reinaugurated as the National Sports Museum in November 2025.

== Collection ==
The museum hosts memoribilia from various Filipino athletes in different sports.

== Facilities ==
The National Sports Museum covers an area of 2,100 square meters (23,000 sq ft) within the PhilSports Complex.
