= Richie Garcia =

Filipino sporting official

9th Chairman of the Philippine Sports Commission
- In office July 19, 2010 – June 30, 2016
- President: Benigno Aquino III
- Preceded by: Harry Angping
- Succeeded by: Butch Ramirez

Ricardo "Richie" Garcia is a Filipino sports executive who formerly served as chairman of the Philippine Sports Commission.

== Background ==
Garcia is a native of Bacolod who attended the De La Salle University. He was first appointed as commissioner of the Philippine Sports Commission (PSC) by President Joseph Estrada in 1999 and was reappointed to the post by Estrada's successor, Gloria Macapagal Arroyo. He was appointed as chairman of the PSC on July 19, 2010 by then President Benigno Aquino III.

Aquino received a recommendation from Philippine Olympic Committee President Peping Cojuangco to appoint Ramirez. Ramirez and Cojuangco reportedly are golfing buddies.
