= 2016 Philippine House of Representatives elections in Metro Manila =

Elections were held in Metro Manila (the National Capital Region) for seats in the House of Representatives of the Philippines on May 9, 2016.

The candidate with the most votes won that district's seat for the 17th Congress of the Philippines.

== Summary ==
Party	Popular vote	%	Swing	Seats won	Change
Liberal				19	
UNA				4	
NPC				3	
Nacionalista				2	
KABAKA				1	
Lakas				1	
NUP				1	
Partido Magdiwang				1	
Aksyon				0	
Ang Kapatiran				0	
KKK				0	
PMP				0	
Independent				0	
Valid votes				32	
Invalid votes					
Turnout					
Registered voters					

== Caloocan ==
=== 1st District ===
Incumbent representative Enrico Echiverri, who was elected with 47% of the vote in 2013, chose not to seek re-election and will instead run again for mayor. Running for this seat areDale Gonzalo Malapitan, who lost to Echiverri in 2013, incumbent councilor Susana Punzalan, Garth Gollayan of PDP–Laban, Romualdo Orbe of Partido Bagong Maharlika, and independent candidates Violeta dela Cruz and Glenn Openiano. Malapitan is the son of incumbent Caloocan mayor Oscar Malapitan, who represented this district from 2004 to 2013.

2016 Philippine House of Representatives election in Caloocan's 1st District
Party	Candidate	Votes	%
Liberal	Along Malapitan	215,639	68.49
NPC	Susana Punzalan	90,950	28.89
Independent	Romualdo Orbe	2,996	0.95
PDP–Laban	Garth Gollayan	2,376	0.76
Independent	Violeta dela Cruz	1,744	0.55
Independent	Glenn Openiano	1,160	0.36
Valid ballots		314,865	
Invalid or blank votes		30,694	
Total votes		345,559	100%
Liberal hold			

=== 2nd District ===
First term incumbent Edgar Erice, who was elected with 39% of the vote in 2013, is seeking re-election. He will have a rematch with his 2013 opponent and then-incumbent Mary Mitzi Cajayon-Uy. Also running is Edgardo Espiritu of Partido Bagong Maharlika. Cajayon-Uy represented this district from 2007 to 2013.

2016 Philippine House of Representatives election in Caloocan's 2nd District
Party	Candidate	Votes	%
Liberal	Edgar Erice	101,051	64.67
NPC	Mitzi Cajayon-Uy	52,549	33.63
Independent	Edgardo Espiritu	2,655	1.70
Valid ballots		156,255	
Invalid or blank votes		13,500	
Total votes		169,755	100%
Liberal hold			

== Las Piñas ==
Two-term incumbent Mark Villar, who was re-elected with 90% of the vote in 2013, is seeking a third term.

2016 Philippine House of Representatives election in Las Piñas
Party	Candidate	Votes	%
Nacionalista	Mark Villar	174,533	86.05
Independent	Zardi Abellara	23,780	11.73
Independent	Filipino Alvarado	4,509	2.22
Valid ballots		202,822	
Invalid or blank votes		21,529	
Total votes		224,351	100%
Nacionalista hold			

== Makati ==
=== 1st District ===
Two-term incumbent Monique Lagdameo, who was re-elected with 71% of the vote in 2013, chose not to seek re-election and will instead run for vice mayor.

Incumbent councilor Maria Concepcion "Ichi" Yabut was supposed to run under the United Nationalist Alliance but later withdrew her candidacy and will instead seek another term as councilor. Actor and incumbent councilor Monsour del Rosario will replace her as UNA's candidate. Running against Del Rosario is Norman Nicholas Garcia of the Liberal Party, Willy Talag of the Nationalist People's Coalition, Eugenia Carreon of PBM, and independent candidate Lourdesiree Latimer.

2016 Philippine House of Representatives election in Makati's 1st District
Party	Candidate	Votes	%
UNA	Manuel Monsour T. del Rosario	76,728	
Liberal	Nico Garcia	38,377	
NPC	Willy Talag	6,043	
Independent	Eugenia Carreon	3,580	
Independent	Lourdesiree Latimer	2,584	
Invalid or blank votes			
Total votes			

=== 2nd District ===
Three-term incumbent Mar-len Abigail Binay, who was re-elected with 83% of the vote in 2013, is barred by term limits from seeking re-election and will instead run for mayor. Her party, the United Nationalist Alliance, nominated her husband, Luis Campos. He will be facing incumbent councilor Israel "Boyet" Cruzado of the Liberal Party, Levi Perez of PBM, and independent candidates Marvin "Vin" Porciuncula and Joel Sarza.

2016 Philippine House of Representatives election in Makati's 2nd District
Party	Candidate	Votes	%
UNA	Luis Campos	79,748	
Liberal	Israel Cruzado	62,145	
PBM	Levi Perez	3,394	
Independent	Joel Sarza	1,248	
Independent	Marvin "Vin" Porciuncula	1,111	
Invalid or blank votes			
Total votes			

== Malabon ==
Three-term incumbent Josephine Lacson-Noel, who ran unopposed in 2013, is barred by term limits from seeking re-election. Her party, the Nationalist People's Coalition, nominated former representative Federico Sandoval II.

Sandoval represented the now-defunct Malabon-Navotas legislative district from 1998 to 2007. Sandoval will be facing former senator Teresa Aquino-Oreta of the Liberal Party and independent candidate Robin Simon. Oreta, who is an aunt of incumbent President Benigno Aquino III, represented Malabon-Navotas in congress from 1987 to 1998 and served in the Senate from 1998 to 2004.

2016 Philippine House of Representatives election in Malabon's Lone District
Party	Candidate	Votes	%
NPC	Federico "Ricky" Sandoval II	69,887	50.0
Liberal	Teresa "Tessie" Aquino-Oreta	68,108	48.7
Independent	Robin Simon	1,886	1.3
Valid ballots		139,881	
Invalid or blank votes		13,639	
Total votes		153,520	100%
NPC hold			

== Mandaluyong ==
Three-term incumbent and House Majority Leader Neptali Gonzales III, who was re-elected with 89% of the vote in 2013, is barred by term limits from seeking re-election. His party, the Liberal Party, nominated his wife, Alexandra "Queenie" Gonzales. She will be facing Jack Ramel of PDP–Laban and independent candidates Francisco Reyes and Albert Yap.

2016 Philippine House of Representatives election in Mandaluyong's Lone District
Party	Candidate	Votes	%
Liberal	Alexandra "Queenie" Gonzales	122,792	79.00%
Independent	Francisco Reyes	9,543	6.14%
PDP–Laban	Jack Ramel	4,147	2.67%
Independent	Albert Yap	1,560	1.00%
Valid ballots		138,042	88.81%
Invalid or blank votes		17,391	11.19%
Total votes		155,433	100%
Liberal hold			

== Manila ==
=== 1st District ===
The 1st district is composed of the western part of Tondo. Three-term Liberal Party incumbent Benjamin "Atong" Asilo, who was re-elected with 64% of the vote in 2013, is term-limited and will instead run for vice mayor; his brother Roberto is his party's nominee.

Also running for this district are incumbent three-term councilors Ian "Banzai" Nieva and Ernesto Dionisio, Jr as well as Manny Lopez. Nieva is the son of the late Ernesto "Banzai" Nieva, who represented this district from 1998 to 2007.

2016 Philippine House of Representatives election in Manila's 1st District
Party	Candidate	Votes	%
NPC	Manny Lopez	55,627	35.35
Liberal	Roberto Asilo	43,640	27.73
Asenso	Ernesto Dionisio, Jr.	42,878	27.25
Nacionalista	Erick Ian Nieva	15,223	9.67
Total votes		157,368	100.00
NPC gain from Liberal			

=== 2nd District ===
The 2nd district is primarily composed of the eastern part of Tondo or also known as Gagalangin sub district. Two-term incumbent Carlo Lopez, who was re-elected with 69% of the vote in 2013, is running for a third term under the Liberal Party.

He is running unopposed because Councilor Numero "Uno" Lim, his supposed opponent, was later nominated by party-list group Tanggal Maralita Inc. (TAMA).

2016 Philippine House of Representatives election in Manila's 2nd District
Party	Candidate	Votes	%
Liberal	Carlo Lopez	72,409	100.00
Total votes		72,409	100.00
Liberal hold			

=== 3rd District ===
The 3rd district is composed of Binondo, Quiapo, San Nicolas, and Santa Cruz. Zenaida "Naida" Angping, who was re-elected with 62% of the vote in 2013, is term-limited and is barred from running again this election. Running to succeed her is her husband, former representative Harry Angping who represented this district from 1998 to 2004.

His opponents are three-term incumbent City Councilor John Marvin “Yul Servo” Nieto and former Councilor Ramon Morales. Morales also ran in this district in 2013 and lost receiving only 36% of the vote.

2016 Philippine House of Representatives election in Manila's 3rd District
Party	Candidate	Votes	%
PMP	John Marvin "Yul Servo" Nieto	46,353	44.93
Nacionalista	Harry Angping	38,636	37.44
Liberal	Ramon Morales	17,021	16.50
PGP	Ricardo Lee	689	0.67
Independent	Edgardo "Jojo" Ruiz	472	0.46
Total votes		103,183	100.00
PMP gain from NPC			

=== 4th District ===
The 4th district is composed of Sampaloc. Congresswoman Ma. Theresa "Trisha" Bonoan-David, who ran unopposed in 2013, is term-limited and is barred from running again this election. Her party nominated her sister, Annie.

Other candidates for this district are three-term councilor Edward Maceda, one-term councilor Science Reyes, two-term councilor Don Juan "DJ" Bagatsing, former Ateneo basketball player Jobe Nkemakolam.

2016 Philippine House of Representatives election in Manila's 4th District
Party	Candidate	Votes	%
Asenso	Edward Maceda	46,349	41.53
KABAKA	Don Juan Bagatsing	23,807	21.28
NPC	Science Reyes	23,650	21.25
NUP	Rosemary "Annie" Leilani Bonoan	16,525	14.81
PDP–Laban	Jobe Sherwin Nkemakolam	1,263	1.13
Total votes		111,594	100.00
PMP gain from NUP			

=== 5th District ===
The 5th district is composed of Ermita, Malate, Paco (excluding Zone 90), Intramuros, Port Area, and San Andres Bukid (including the Manila South Cemetery). Amado Bagatsing, who was re-elected with 89% of the vote in 2013, is term-limited and is barred from running again this election and will instead run for Mayor. His party's nominee is his daughter Cristal.

Her opponents are former representatives Joey Hizon and Mary Ann Susano as well as incumbent three-term councilor Josie Siscar. Joey Hizon represented this district from 1998 to 2007. Meanwhile, Mary Ann Susano represented Quezon City's 2nd Congressional District from 2004 to 2010.

2016 Philippine House of Representatives election in Manila's 5th District
Party	Candidate	Votes	%
KABAKA	Amanda Christina Bagatsing	48,380	37.40
PMP	Joey Hizon	34,952	27.02
NPC	Mary Ann Susano	27,083	20.93
Liberal	Josefina Siscar	16,420	12.69
LDP	Jupakar Arabani	1,882	1.45
LM	Mario Cayabyab	655	0.51
Total votes		129,372	100%
KABAKA hold			

=== 6th District ===
The 6th district is composed of Paco (Zone 90), Pandacan, Santa Ana, San Miguel, and Santa Mesa. Two-term incumbent Sandy Ocampo, who won re-election in 2013 with 51% of the vote, is seeking a third term. She is co-nominated by NUP and local party KABAKA.

This is the third straight election in which the two candidates are facing each other with Ocampo winning the first two by narrow margins.

2016 Philippine House of Representatives election in Manila's 6th District
Party	Candidate	Votes	%
Liberal	Rosenda Ann "Sandy" Ocampo	56,844	53.41
Asenso	Benny M. Abante	48,260	45.35
PGP	Richard Bautista	695	0.65
Independent	Jose Castillo	623	0.59
Total votes		106,422	100.00
Liberal hold			

== Marikina ==
=== 1st District ===
Incumbent Representative Marcelino Teodoro, who was re-elected in 2013 unopposed, is term-limited and is barred from running again this election. Incumbent councilor Samuel Ferriol, former Marikina mayor and MMDA Chairman Bayani Fernando, and independent candidate Jopet Sison are running to succeed him.

2016 Philippine House of Representatives election in Marikina's 1st District
Party	Candidate	Votes	%
NPC	Bayani "BF" Fernando	43,127	54.21%
Liberal	Samuel "SF" Ferriol	29,619	37.23%
Independent	Jopet Sison	3,490	4.39%
Margin of victory		13,508	16.98%
Valid ballots		76,236	95.83%
Invalid or blank votes		3,321	4.17%
Total votes		79,557	100%
NPC hold			

=== 2nd District ===
Two-term incumbent Miro Quimbo, who was re-elected with 95% of the vote in 2013, is running for a third term unopposed.

2016 Philippine House of Representatives election in Marikina's 2nd District
Party	Candidate	Votes	%
Liberal	Miro Quimbo	85,915	84.68%
Invalid or blank votes		15,547	15.32%
Total votes		101,462	100%
Liberal hold			

== Muntinlupa ==
Two-term incumbent Rodolfo Biazon, who was re-elected with 75% of the vote in 2013, decided not to file for re-election. His party, the Liberal Party, nominated his son, former Customs Commissioner Ruffy Biazon who represented this district from 2001 to 2010. He will be facing actor and Optical Media Board Chairman Ronnie Ricketts.

On January 29, 2016, the Sandiganbayan suspended Ricketts and three other Optical Media Board personnel due to graft charges in relation to a 2010 incident involving copyright infringing CDs and DVDs.

2016 Philippine House of Representatives election in Muntinlupa
Party	Candidate	Votes	%
Liberal	Rozzano Rufino "Ruffy" B. Biazon	135,472	60.36%
UNA	Ronald "Ronnie" Ricketts	69,508	30.97%
Valid ballots		204,980	91.33%
Invalid or blank votes		19,466	8.67%
Total votes		224,446	100.00%
Liberal hold			

== Navotas ==
Two-term incumbent Toby Tiangco, who was re-elected with 80% of the vote in 2013, is seeking a third term. He is facing independent candidate Dong Luna.

2016 Philippine House of Representatives election in Navotas Lone District
Party	Candidate	Votes	%
UNA	Tobias Reynald Tiangco	84,550	95.66
Independent	Dong Luna	3,827	4.33
Total votes		102,600	100.00
UNA hold			

== Parañaque ==
=== 1st District ===
First term incumbent Eric Olivarez, who was elected with 63% of the vote in 2013, is seeking a second term. Running against him is Vic Celeridad of Partido Bagong Maharlika.

2016 Philippine House of Representatives election in Parañaque's 1st District
Party	Candidate	Votes	%
Liberal	Eric Olivarez	79,760	97.26%
UNA	Vic Celeridad	2,243	2.73%
Total votes		82,003	100.00%

=== 2nd District ===
First term incumbent Gus Tambunting, who was elected with 53% of the vote in 2013, is seeking re-election. He will face former representative Roilo Golez, who represented this district from 2004 to 2013, as well as independent candidates Pete Montaño and Pacifico Rosal.

2016 Philippine House of Representatives election in Parañaque's 2nd District
Party	Candidate	Votes	%
UNA	Gustavo “Gus” Tambunting	64,545	50.58%
Independent	Roilo Golez	61,493	48.19%
Independent	Pacifico Rosal	881	0.69%
Lakas	Pete Montaño	666	0.52%
Total votes		127,585	100.00%

== Pasay ==
Two-term incumbent Imelda Calixto-Rubiano, who was re-elected with 82% of the vote in 2013, is seeking a third term. She will face independent candidate Sonny Quial, Deo Laguipo of Partido Bagong Maharlika and independent candidate Bong Tebelin.

2016 Philippine House of Representatives election in Pasay's Lone District
Party	Candidate	Votes	%
Liberal	Imelda “Emi” G. Calixto-Rubiano	140,774	80.51
Independent	Atty. Sonny Quial	30,890	17.67
PDP–Laban	Atty. Jose Allan “Bong” M. Tebelin	1,929	1.10
PBM	Deo Laguipo	1,265	0.72
Total votes		174,858	100.00

== Pasig ==
Three-term incumbent Roman Romulo, who was re-elected with 88% of the vote in 2013, is barred by term limits from seeking re-election. Incumbent councilors Ricky Eusebio and Christian Sia, and Romulo's sister, Mons Romulo are running to succeed him.

2016 Philippine House of Representatives election in Pasig's Lone District
Party	Candidate	Votes	%
Nacionalista	Ricky Eusebio	145,677	48.0
Liberal	Christian Sia	87,711	28.9
NPC	Mons Romulo	70,392	23.2
Total votes		303,770	100.0%

== Quezon City ==
Incumbent representatives from the 2nd, 3rd and 5th legislative districts are running for re-election unopposed.

=== 1st District ===
First term incumbent Francisco Calalay, who was elected with 51% of the vote in 2013, is seeking a second term. He will be facing former representative Vincent Crisologo who represented this district from 2004 to 2013.

On January 20, 2016, the Office of the Ombudsman found Calalay guilty of falsification of official documents, serious dishonesty, conduct prejudicial to the best interest of the service, and grave misconduct for allegedly hiring ghost employees when he was still a city councilor. This could mean that if Calalay would be disqualified, Crislogo will stand unopposed for election.

2016 Philippine House of Representatives election at Quezon City's 1st district
Party	Candidate	Votes	%
PDP–Laban	Vincent "Bingbong" Crisologo	81,799	55.20%
Liberal	Francisco "Boy" Calalay	57,056	38.50%
Margin of victory		24,743	16.70%
Valid ballots		138,855	93.70%
Invalid or blank votes		9,342	6.30%
Total votes		138,855	100%
PDP–Laban gain from Liberal			

=== 2nd District ===
Two-term incumbent Winston Castelo, who was re-elected with 63% of the vote in 2013, is seeking a third term unopposed.

2016 Philippine House of Representatives election at Quezon City's 2nd district
Party	Candidate	Votes	%
Liberal	Winston "Winnie" Castelo	172,001	79.36%
Invalid or blank votes		44,722	20.64%
Total votes		216,723	100.00
Liberal hold			

=== 3rd District ===
Two-term incumbent Jorge Banal, who was re-elected with 56% of the vote in 2013, is seeking a third term unopposed.

2016 Philippine House of Representatives election at Quezon City's 3rd district
Party	Candidate	Votes	%
Liberal	Jorge "Bolet" Banal	79,579	75.05%
Invalid or blank votes		26,458	24.95%
Total votes		106,037	100%
Liberal hold			

=== 4th District ===
Two-term incumbent and House Speaker Feliciano Belmonte, who was re-elected with 91% of the vote in 2013, is seeking re-election. He is facing Hadja Lorna Aquino of PBM, and his 2013 opponent, independent candidate Hans Palacios.

2016 Philippine House of Representatives election at Quezon City's 4th district
Party	Candidate	Votes	%
Liberal	Feliciano "Sonny" Belmonte, Jr.	115,007	77.08%
UNA	Hans Palacios	6,900	4.62%
PGP	Hadja Lorna Aquino	3,961	2.47%
Margin of victory		108,107	72.44%
Valid ballots		125,598	84.17%
Invalid or blank votes		23,614	15.83%
Total votes		149,212	100%
Liberal hold			

=== 5th District ===
First term incumbent and actor Alfred Vargas, who was elected with 62% of the vote in 2013, is running for a second term unopposed.

2016 Philippine House of Representatives election at Quezon City's 5th district
Party	Candidate	Votes	%
Liberal	Alfred Vargas	134,946	84.16%
Invalid or blank votes		25,398	15.84%
Total votes		160,344	100%
Liberal hold			

=== 6th District ===
First term incumbent Christopher Belmonte, who was elected in 2013 unopposed, is seeking another term unopposed.

2016 Philippine House of Representatives election at Quezon City's 6th district
Party	Candidate	Votes	%
Liberal	Jose Christopher "Kit" Belmonte	102,171	77.69%
Invalid or blank votes		29,344	22.31%
Total votes		131,515	100%
Liberal hold			

== San Juan ==
First term incumbent and House Minority Floor Leader Ronaldo Zamora, who was elected with 52% of the vote in 2013, is seeking re-election. He will be facing his 2013 opponent, former councilor Jana Ejercito and independent candidate George Cordero.

2016 Philippine House of Representatives election in San Juan's Lone district
Party	Candidate	Votes	%
Nacionalista	Ronaldo Zamora	31,172	56.63
PMP	Jana Ejercito	22,922	41.64
Independent	George Cordero	952	1.73
Total votes		55,046	100.00

== Taguig and Pateros ==
Taguig's 1st district and Pateros are grouped together for purposes of electing a member to the House of Representatives. Otherwise, both places have their own local officials.

=== 1st District of Taguig and Pateros ===
This district is composed of the Municipality of Pateros as well as the eastern half of Taguig. Two-term incumbent Arnel Cerafica, who was re-elected with 68% of the vote in 2013, is seeking re-election. He is facing Gloria Cabrera of PBM.

2016 Philippine House of Representatives election in Pateros-Taguig Lone District
Party	Candidate	Votes	%
Liberal	Arnel Cerafica	102,954	
Independent	Gloria Cabrera	11,051	
Valid ballots		114,005	
Invalid or blank votes		29,101	
Total votes		143,106	
Liberal hold			

=== 2nd District of Taguig ===
First term incumbent Lino Cayetano filed to run for a second term but later withdrew his candidacy. He was substituted by his sister, incumbent two-term Senator Pia Cayetano. She will be facing incumbent councilor Michelle Anne Gonzales.

2016 Philippine House of Representatives election in Taguig's Lone District
Party	Candidate	Votes	%
Nacionalista	Pia Cayetano	94,228	
UNA	Michelle Anne Gonzales	41,539	
Valid ballots		135,767	
Invalid or blank votes		10,590	
Total votes		146,357	
Nacionalista hold			

== Valenzuela ==
=== 1st District ===
First term incumbent Sherwin Gatchalian, who was elected with 74% of the vote in 2013, chose not to seek re-election and is running for a Senate seat instead. His brother, incumbent Alay Buhay Partylist representative Weslie Gatchalian is running to succeed him. Weslie is running against former councilor Ritche Cuadra who lost to Sherwin in 2013. Also running for the seat is Victor Reponia of PBM.

2016 Valenzuela congressional 1st district election
Party	Candidate	Votes	%
NPC	Weslie T. Gatchalian	92,541	74.26
Liberal	Ritche D. Cuadra	22,246	17.85
PBM	Victor Reponia	336	0.27
Valid ballots		115,123	92.38
Invalid or blank votes		9,491	7.62
Total votes		124,614	100.00
NPC hold			

=== 2nd District ===
Three-term incumbent Magtanggol Gunigundo, who was re-elected with 51% of the vote in 2013, is barred by term limits from seeking re-election and is running for Mayor instead. His wife, Adelma, is running against incumbent Valenzuela City Vice Mayor Eric Martinez.

2016 Valenzuela congressional 2nd district election
Party	Candidate	Votes	%
PDP–Laban	Eric M. Martinez	86,069	60.13
Liberal	Adelma Yang-Gunigundo	44,045	30.77
Valid ballots		130,114	90.90
Invalid or blank votes		13,027	9.10
Total votes		143,141	100.00
PDP–Laban hold			
