= Antel Arena =

Indoor arena in Montevideo, Uruguay

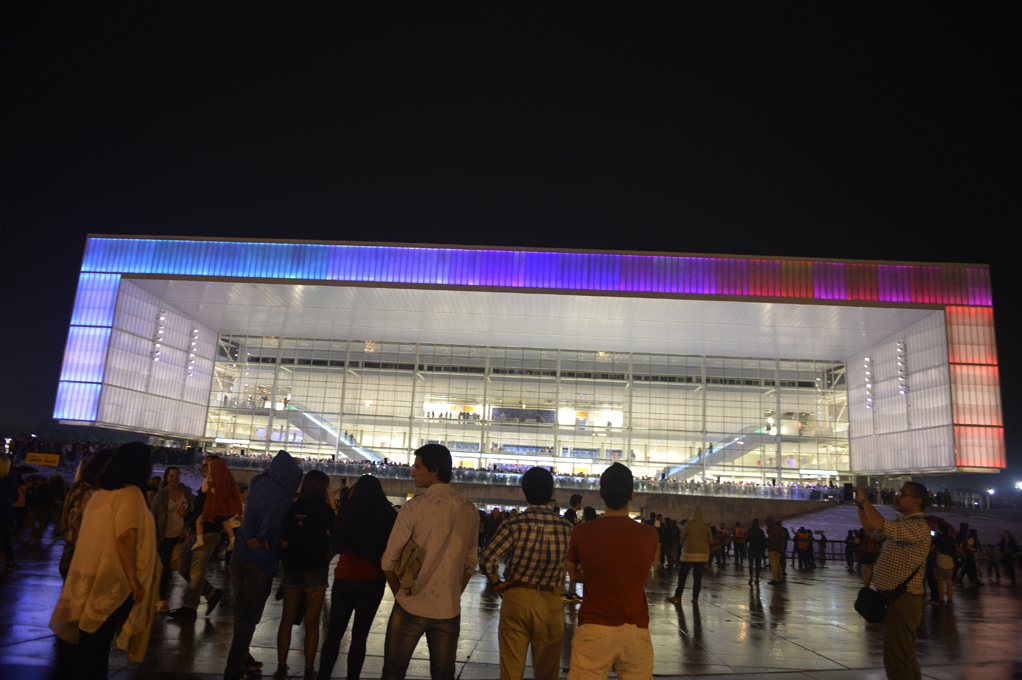
- The exterior of Antel Arena.
- Interactive map of Antel Arena
- Location: Villa Española, Montevideo, Uruguay
- Coordinates: 34.862844°S 56.153611°W
- Owner: Intendencia de Montevideo
- Operator: ASM Global
- Capacity: Concerts: 15,000; Basketball: 10,000
- Field size: 40,000 square meters

Construction
- Groundbreaking: May 2014
- Opened: November 12, 2018
- Cost: USD$118,000,000
- Architects: Pablo Bacchetta; Jose Flores; Rodrigo Carámbula
- Structural engineer: Magnone Pollio

Tenant
- Uruguayan basketball team (2018–present)

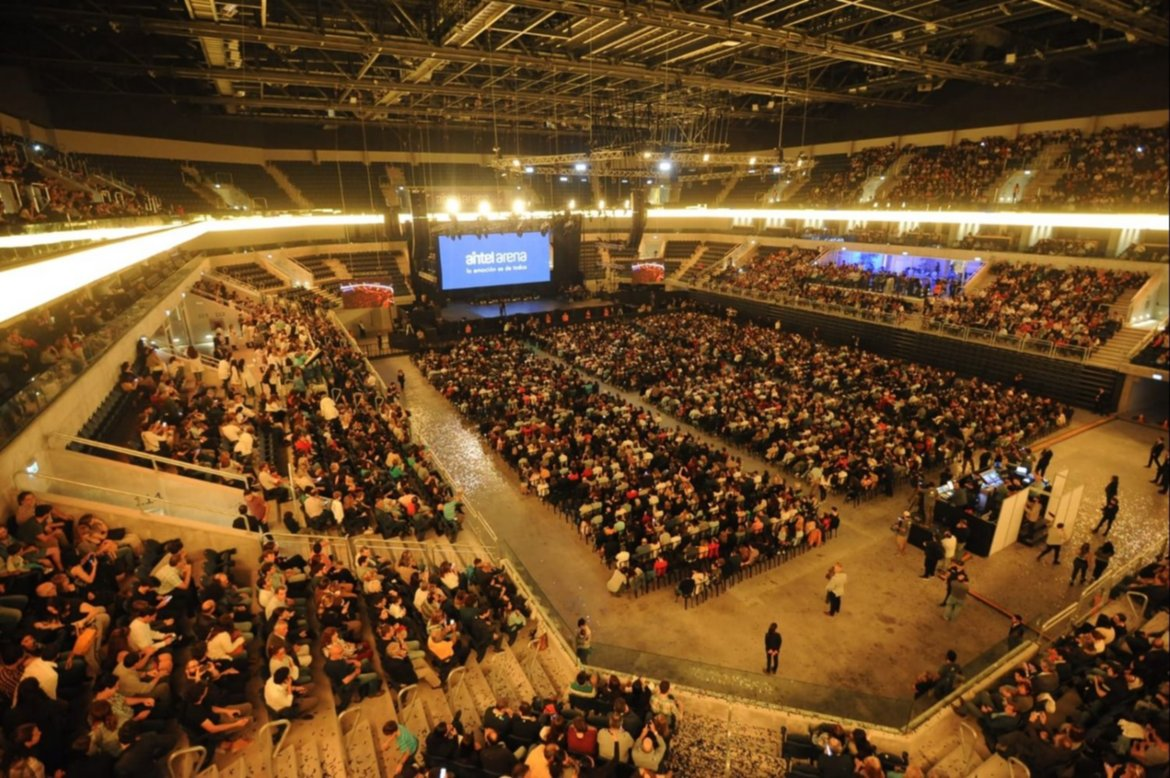
The interior of Antel Arena, during its inauguration.

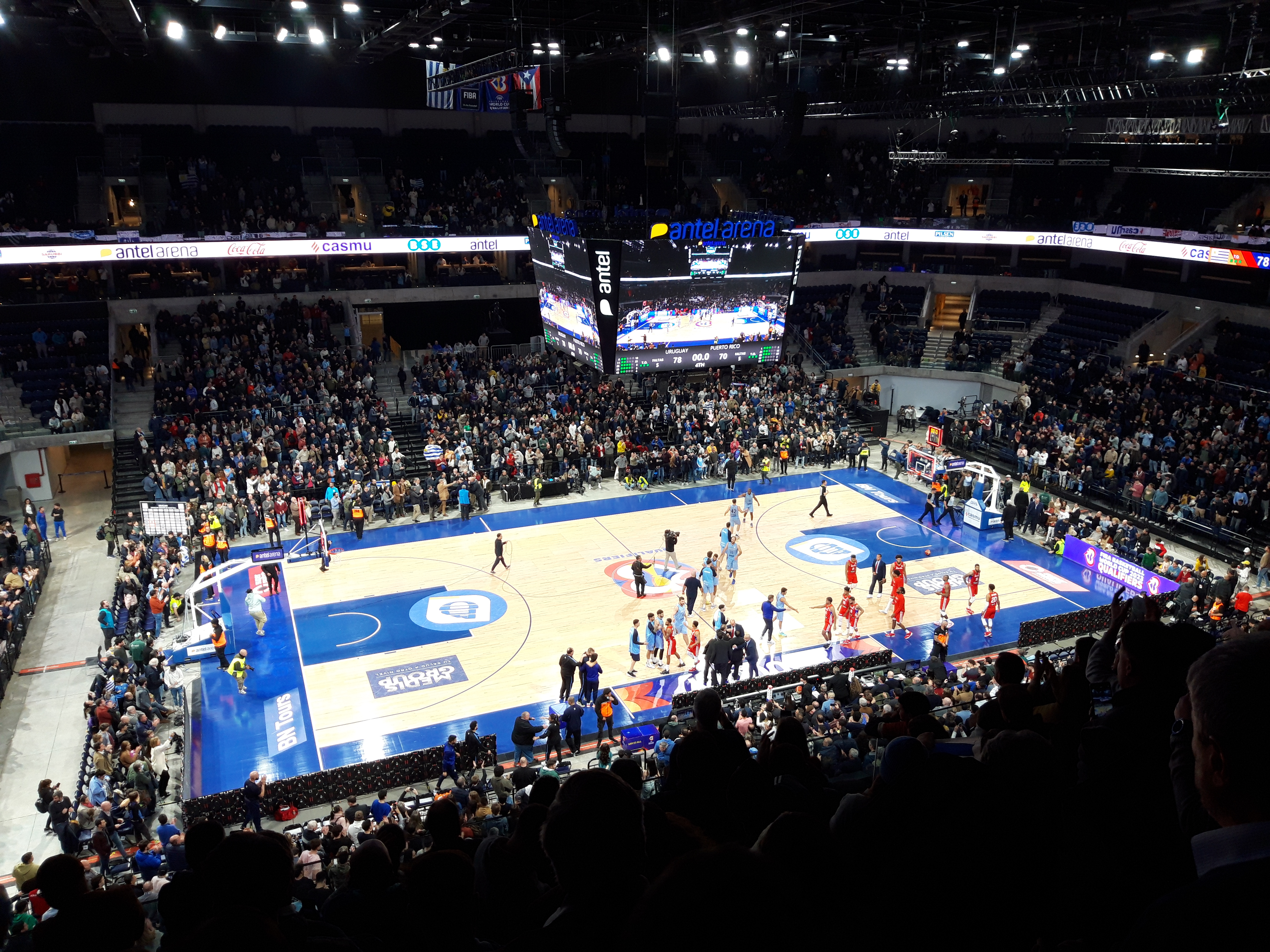
Basketball match in 2022.

The Antel Arena is a multipurpose indoor arena that is located in the neighborhood of Villa Española, Montevideo, Uruguay. The arena has a capacity of 15,000 people for concerts, and 10,000 people for basketball games.

The arena was built by the state telecommunications company ANTEL after they reached an agreement with the city of Montevideo, which granted them the rights to the arena for 30 years. The venue is operated by American company ASM Global.

== History ==
The arena was built at the location of the old Cilindro Municipal, after it was left in a dilapidated state after a fire. Before the Antel Arena could be constructed, the old Cilindro Municipal had to be demolished. Construction on Antel Arena began in May 2014, and the arena opened on November 12, 2018.

The arena was used to host home games of the senior men's Uruguayan national basketball team, during 2019 FIBA World Cup Americas qualifiers. The arena was also included as a proposed host venue, as a part of the Argentina–Uruguay bid for the 2023 FIBA World Cup. However, the right to host the 2023 FIBA World Cup was ultimately won by the rival Philippine–Japanese–Indonesian bid.

== Concerts and shows ==
Event	Date
(Uruguay) Antel Arena Inauguration	12 November 2018
(Argentina) (Mexico) Soy Luna en vivo	14 November 2018
(Spain) Joan Manuel Serrat	17 November 2018
(Colombia) Maluma	19 November 2018
(Uruguay) Gutenberg	24 November 2018
(United Kingdom) Sarah Brightman	6 December 2018
(Argentina) Abel Pintos	15 December 2018
(Uruguay) Agarrate Catalina|Agarrate Catalina 15 + 2	21 December 2018
(Spain) Pablo Alborán	11 April 2019
(United States) UFC on ESPN+ 14	10 August 2019
(Argentina) Tini Stoessel	7 September 2019
(Colombia) Sebastián Yatra	3 October 2019
(Brazil) Ivete Sangalo	12 October 2019
(Canada) Bryan Adams	14 October 2019
(United Kingdom) Passenger	4 December 2019
(Puerto Rico) Ricky Martin	2 March 2020
(United States) Backstreet Boys	8 March 2020; 9 March 2020
(Colombia) Karol G	11 March 2020
(Mexico) Julieta Venegas	7 November 2020
Got Talent Uruguay Season 1 Finale	7 December 2020
(Argentina) Don Osvaldo	6 March 2021
(Venezuela) Mau y Ricky	12 October 2021
(Uruguay) El Cuarteto de Nos	29 October 2021; 30 October 2021; 31 October 2021
(Argentina) Vicentico	4 November 2021
(Uruguay) Chacho Ramos	6 November 2021; 7 November 2021
(Colombia) Morat	11 November 2021; 12 November 2021
(Argentina) Luciano Pereyra	26 November 2021; 27 November 2021
(Argentina) (Uruguay) Bajofondo	9 December 2021
(Uruguay) Márama	17 December 2021; 23 December 2021
(Argentina) Soy Luna	17 November 2026

== Major sporting events ==
Event	Date
UFC Fight Night: Shevchenko vs. Carmouche 2	10 August, 2019
2019 NBA G League International Challenge	18–22 September, 2019
2020 BCL Americas Final	30 October 2020
