= Manila's 3rd congressional district =

Filipino congressional district

- Constituency for the House of Representatives of the Philippines
- Boundary of Manila's 3rd congressional district in Manila
- Location of Manila within Metro Manila
- City: Manila
- Region: Metro Manila
- Population: 220,029 (2020)
- Electorate: 156,053 (2025)
- Major settlements: 4 city districts: Binondo; Quiapo; San Nicolas; Santa Cruz
- Area: 6.24 km^{2} (2.41 sq mi)

Current constituency
- Created: 1949
- Representative: Joel R. Chua
- Political party: NUP; Asenso Manileño
- Congressional bloc: Majority

Manila's 3rd congressional district is one of the six congressional districts of the Philippines in the city of Manila. It has been represented in the House of Representatives of the Philippines since 1949. The district consists of barangays 268 to 394 in the northern Manila districts of Binondo, Quiapo, San Nicolas and Santa Cruz since 1987. Until 1972, the district encompassed the eastern Manila districts of Sampaloc, which included the present-day Santa Mesa, and San Miguel. It is currently represented in the 20th Congress by Joel Chua of National Unity Party and Asenso Manileño.

== Representation history ==
#	Image	Member	Term of office		Congress	Party	Electoral history	Constituent LGUs
#	Image	Member	Start	End	Congress	Party	Electoral history	Constituent LGUs
=== Manila's 3rd district for the House of Representatives of the Philippines ===
District created June 18, 1949.
1		Arturo Tolentino	December 30, 1949	December 30, 1957	2nd	Nacionalista	Elected in 1949.	1949–1972; Sampaloc, San Miguel
1		Arturo Tolentino	December 30, 1949	December 30, 1957	3rd	Nacionalista	Re-elected in 1953.	1949–1972; Sampaloc, San Miguel
2		Ramon Bagatsing	December 30, 1957	December 30, 1965	4th	Liberal	Elected in 1957.	1949–1972; Sampaloc, San Miguel
2		Ramon Bagatsing	December 30, 1957	December 30, 1965	5th	Liberal	Re-elected in 1961.	1949–1972; Sampaloc, San Miguel
3		Sergio H. Loyola	December 30, 1965	December 30, 1969	6th	Liberal	Elected in 1965.	1949–1972; Sampaloc, San Miguel
(2)		Ramon Bagatsing	December 30, 1969	January 1, 1972	7th	Liberal	Elected in 1969. Resigned on election as Manila mayor.	1949–1972; Sampaloc, San Miguel
District dissolved into the nineteen-seat Region IV's at-large district for the Interim Batasang Pambansa, followed by the six-seat Manila's at-large district for the Regular Batasang Pambansa.
District re-created February 2, 1987.
4		Leonardo B. Fugoso	June 30, 1987	June 30, 1998	8th	Liberal	Elected in 1987.	1987–present Binondo, Quiapo, San Nicolas, Santa Cruz (Barangays 268–394)
4		Leonardo B. Fugoso	June 30, 1987	June 30, 1998	9th	Liberal	Re-elected in 1992.	1987–present Binondo, Quiapo, San Nicolas, Santa Cruz (Barangays 268–394)
4		Leonardo B. Fugoso	June 30, 1987	June 30, 1998	10th	Liberal	Re-elected in 1995.	1987–present Binondo, Quiapo, San Nicolas, Santa Cruz (Barangays 268–394)
5		Harry Angping	June 30, 1998	June 30, 2004	11th	LAMMP	Elected in 1998.	1987–present Binondo, Quiapo, San Nicolas, Santa Cruz (Barangays 268–394)
5		Harry Angping	June 30, 1998	June 30, 2004	12th	NPC	Re-elected in 2001.	1987–present Binondo, Quiapo, San Nicolas, Santa Cruz (Barangays 268–394)
6		Miles Andrew M. Roces	June 30, 2004	June 30, 2007	13th	Liberal	Elected in 2004.	1987–present Binondo, Quiapo, San Nicolas, Santa Cruz (Barangays 268–394)
7		Zenaida Angping	June 30, 2007	June 30, 2016	14th	NPC	Elected in 2007.	1987–present Binondo, Quiapo, San Nicolas, Santa Cruz (Barangays 268–394)
7		Zenaida Angping	June 30, 2007	June 30, 2016	15th	NPC	Re-elected in 2010.	1987–present Binondo, Quiapo, San Nicolas, Santa Cruz (Barangays 268–394)
7		Zenaida Angping	June 30, 2007	June 30, 2016	16th	NPC	Re-elected in 2013.	1987–present Binondo, Quiapo, San Nicolas, Santa Cruz (Barangays 268–394)
8		Yul Servo Nieto	June 30, 2016	June 30, 2022	17th	PDP–Laban (Asenso)	Elected in 2016.	1987–present Binondo, Quiapo, San Nicolas, Santa Cruz (Barangays 268–394)
8		Yul Servo Nieto	June 30, 2016	June 30, 2022	18th	Aksyon (Asenso)	Re-elected in 2019.	1987–present Binondo, Quiapo, San Nicolas, Santa Cruz (Barangays 268–394)
9		Joel Chua	June 30, 2022	Incumbent	19th	Aksyon (Asenso)	Elected in 2022.	1987–present Binondo, Quiapo, San Nicolas, Santa Cruz (Barangays 268–394)
9		Joel Chua	June 30, 2022	Incumbent	19th	Lakas (Asenso)	Elected in 2022.	1987–present Binondo, Quiapo, San Nicolas, Santa Cruz (Barangays 268–394)
9		Joel Chua	June 30, 2022	Incumbent	20th	NUP (Asenso)	Re-elected in 2025.	1987–present Binondo, Quiapo, San Nicolas, Santa Cruz (Barangays 268–394)

== Election results ==
=== 2025 ===
Candidate	Party	Votes	%
Joel Chua (incumbent)	Lakas–CMD	55,007	47.83
Apple Nieto-Rodriguez	Aksyon Demokratiko	51,283	44.59
Ramon Morales	Partido Demokratiko Pilipino	8,725	7.59
Total		115,015	100.00
Lakas–CMD hold			

=== 2022 ===
2022 Philippine House of Representatives elections
Party	Candidate	Votes	%
Asenso	Joel Chua	68,946	67.78
PDP–Laban	Ramon Morales	31,030	30.50
Independent	Clark Field Arroño	1,748	1.72
Total votes		101,724	100.00
Asenso hold			

=== 2019 ===
2019 Philippine House of Representatives elections
Party	Candidate	Votes	%
PDP–Laban	John Marvin "Yul Servo" Nieto (incumbent)	65,153	67.81
Lakas	Zenaida Angping	30,925	32.19
Total votes		96,078	100.00
PDP–Laban hold			

=== 2016 ===
2016 Philippine House of Representatives elections
Party	Candidate	Votes	%
Asenso	John Marvin "Yul Servo" Nieto	46,353	
Nacionalista	Harry Angping	38,636	
Liberal	Ramon Morales	17,021	
Independent	Ricardo Lee	701	
Independent	Jojo Ruiz	472	
Invalid or blank votes		8,083	
Total votes		111,266	
Asenso gain from NPC			

=== 2013 ===
2013 Philippine House of Representatives election at Manila's 3rd district
Party	Candidate	Votes	%
NPC	Zenaida Angping	50,466	62.18
KKK	Ramon Morales	29,606	36.48
Independent	Alex Garcia	1,091	1.34
Margin of victory		20,860	25.70
Rejected ballots		7,352	8.31
Turnout		88,515	
NPC hold			

=== 2010 ===
2010 Philippine House of Representatives elections
Party	Candidate	Votes	%
NPC	Zenaida Angping	62,085	64.06
PMP	Manuel Zarcal	32.634	33.67
Independent	Erlinda Reyes	912	0.94
Independent	Cristina Zamora	512	0.53
Independent	Wally Dizon	389	0.40
Independent	Rodolfo Flores	381	0.40
Valid ballots		96,913	94.00
Invalid or blank votes		6,182	6.00
Total votes		103,095	100.00
NPC hold			

== See also ==
- Legislative districts of Manila
