= Philippine bid for the 2019 FIBA Basketball World Cup =

Bid of the Philippines for the 2019 FIBA Basketball World cup

Philippines bid
- for the 2019 FIBA Basketball World Cup

Bid details
- Bidding nation: Philippines
- Bidding federation: Samahang Basketbol ng Pilipinas
- Proposed venues: 4 (in 4 cities)
- Bidding decision: 7 August 2015 in Tokyo, Japan

Bid result
- Lost to China's bid

In early 2015, the National Basketball Association of the Philippines, Samahang Basketbol ng Pilipinas, unsuccessfully bid for the right to host the 2019 FIBA Basketball World Cup. On 16 March 2015, the bid became one of the only two formal candidates with the other bidding nation being China, as FIBA decided that the 2019 World Cup will be played in Asia.

== Bid team ==
A six-man bidding team was formed in December 2014, to attend the bid workshop in Geneva, Switzerland. It was led by Philippine Tourism Undersecretary Domingo Ramon Eneiro, Philippine Basketball Association Chairman Pato Gregorio, and SBP Executive Director Sonny Barrios. Also included in the team are SBP Deputy Executive Director Butch Antonio, Logistics Consultant Andrew Teh, and Octagon Asia-Pacific President Sean Nicholls.

== Timeline ==
Date	Notes
17 July 2014	SBP President Manny V. Pangilinan confirmed the formal bidding.
30 August-15 September 2014	Observers Programme at the 2014 FIBA Basketball World Cup in Spain
11 December 2014	FIBA announced the 6 shortlisted nations.
15–16 December 2014	Workshop in Geneva, Switzerland
26–30 January 2015	On-site Inspection of Probable Venues in the Philippines.
16 March 2015	The Philippine Bid was listed as a Candidate together with China.
April 2015	Submission of Final Candidature Files
7 August 2015	FIBA to appoint host nations for 2019 and 2023 FIBA Basketball World Cup.

The SBP announced its interest to host the 2019 Basketball World Cup in September 2013, right after the successful hosting of the 2013 FIBA Asia Championship, which top FIBA officials commended the nation for the high attendance rating, TV coverage, and logistics management.

== Details ==
A number of sites were proposed as venues for the Basketball World Cup.

FIBA underlined some requirements for the venues to be used:

- There should be at least a minimum of 4-5 venues, 2 venues for the Knock-out Stage
- A press center 150 pax for the group stage and 300 pax for the final Round, 2 square meters per person

== Proposed venues ==
At least four venues to be proposed as venues.

The Solaire Arena in Parañaque which is part of the Solaire Resort & Casino, and the Bacolod City Arena in Bacolod were also planned to be venues for the bid but was not part of the final list of venues for the Philippine bid for the 2019 FIBA Basketball World Cup.

A three-man FIBA Evaluation Commission fly arrived in the Philippines on January 26, 2015, to inspect the four venues and assess the Philippines' capability to host the 2019 FIBA Basketball World Cup. Patrick Baumann, secretary-general of FIBA three days after the first group arrived.

On January 30, 2015, in a press conference at the Makati Shangri-La Hotel, FIBA secretary general Patrick Baumann declared that the Philippines is capable of hosting the FIBA World Cup in 2019.

Venues throughout the Philippines	Pasay	Quezon City	Venues within Metro Manila
Philippine bid for the 2019 FIBA Basketball World Cup is located in Philippines	Mall of Asia Arena	Smart Araneta Coliseum	Philippine bid for the 2019 FIBA Basketball World Cup is located in Metro Manila
Philippine bid for the 2019 FIBA Basketball World Cup is located in Philippines	Capacity: 20,000	Capacity: 25,000	Philippine bid for the 2019 FIBA Basketball World Cup is located in Metro Manila
Philippine bid for the 2019 FIBA Basketball World Cup is located in Philippines	Bocaue	Cebu City	Philippine bid for the 2019 FIBA Basketball World Cup is located in Metro Manila
Philippine bid for the 2019 FIBA Basketball World Cup is located in Philippines	Philippine Arena	Seaside City Arena (new venue)	Philippine bid for the 2019 FIBA Basketball World Cup is located in Metro Manila
Philippine bid for the 2019 FIBA Basketball World Cup is located in Philippines	Capacity: 55,000	Capacity: 16,000	Philippine bid for the 2019 FIBA Basketball World Cup is located in Metro Manila

== Final Bid Presentation ==
The final bid presentation was made in Tokyo on August 7, 2015. Filipino fans were urged to make the hashtag #PUSO2019 trending on social media while the final bid was being presented. The bid focused on "heartware,” or what the bidding team describes as the passion of the Filipino for basketball. The bid also highlighted the designation of the country as the "social media capital of the world".

A bidding team composing of 11 people was sent to Tokyo for the final bid presentation. The people who composed the bidding team were:

- Jimmy Alapag
- Sonny Angara
- Patrick Gregorio
- Manny Pacquiao
- Manny V. Pangilinan
- Lou Diamond Phillips
- Robbie Puno
- Chot Reyes
- Albert del Rosario
- Chito Salud
- Reynaldo Umali

== Reception ==
On 12 June 2015, a fan rally was held to highlight the Filipino spirit for basketball in the country at the parking area of the Smart Araneta Coliseum. It was held during the Independence Day of the Philippines. The event was attended by around 2,000 to 3,000 people. It was also attended by some members of the Philippines men's national basketball team, former national team member and captain Jimmy Alapag, then UCLA prospect Kobe Paras, and his father Benjie Paras.

Official Twitter and Facebook accounts were launched by July, a month before the host nation is announced. The #PUSO2019 hashtag was promoted and made trending as part of the campaign. “Dunkfies" where netizens posts selfies using a makeshift toy ring instead of a selfie stick also became trending in social media as part of the #PUSO2019 campaign. A campaign similar to the ALS Ice Bucket Challenge, "Para sa Pinas" (For the Philippines) was also conducted where fans express support though video and calling others to do the same.

== Aftermath ==
In January 2016, after losing the bid to China, the Philippines expressed its interest to bid for the 2023 FIBA Basketball World Cup along with another country. It was considered whether to make a joint bid for the 2023 tournament with Malaysia, Singapore or South Korea. The country was also awarded the hosting rights of one of the 2016 FIBA World Olympic Qualifying Tournaments for Men on 19 January 2016, and hosted the 2019 Southeast Asian Games, where the country hosted 56 sports and 530 events.

On 1 June 2017, FIBA announced the joint bid of the Philippines, Indonesia, and Japan as one of the shortlisted bids to host the FIBA Basketball World Cup 2023. On 9 December 2017, the joint bid of the Philippines, Indonesia, and Japan won after Argentina and Uruguay, the only other candidates, withdrew their joint bid.
