= Joel Chua =

Filipino lawyer and politician (born 1972)

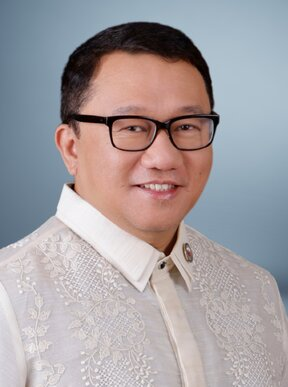
- Official portrait, 2026

Member of the Philippine House of Representatives from Manila's 3rd congressional district
- Incumbent
- Assumed office June 30, 2022
- Preceded by: Yul Servo

Chairman of the House Committee on Good Government and Public Accountability
- Incumbent
- Assumed office September 4, 2024
- Preceded by: Florida Robes

Member of the Manila City Council from the 3rd district
- In office June 30, 2019 – June 30, 2022
- In office June 30, 2007 – June 30, 2016

Personal details
- Born: Joel Respall Chua; August 17, 1972 (age 54) Quiapo, Manila, Philippines
- Party: NUP (2026–present); Asenso Manileño (local party; 2018–present)
- Other political affiliations: Lakas–CMD (2024–2026); Aksyon (2021–2024); UNA (2012–2018); PMP (2009–2012); Lakas–CMD (I) (2007–2009)
- Spouse: Eiline Buenaventura Chua
- Children: 3
- Education: University of Santo Tomas (BS); San Sebastian College – Recoletos (LL.B.); University of the Philippines (MPA)
- Occupation: Politician
- Profession: Lawyer

Joel Respall Chua (born August 17, 1972) is a Filipino lawyer and politician who has served as the representative for Manila's third district since 2022. He previously served as a member of the Manila City Council from 2007 to 2016 and again from 2019 to 2022. He is also the secretary-general of the Asenso Manileño, a local party in Manila.

== Early life and career ==
Joel Respal Chua was born on August 17, 1972, in Quiapo, Manila. He earned his bachelor's degree in accountancy from the University of Santo Tomas, a law degree from San Sebastian College – Recoletos, and a master's degree in public administration from the University of the Philippines.

Chua began his political career in 2007 when he was elected as a city councilor for Manila's third district. He served three consecutive terms until 2016, when he reached his term limit. During this period, he focused on local governance and community development. After a brief hiatus, he returned to the council in 2019 and served until his election to Congress in 2022.

== House of Representatives (2022–present) ==
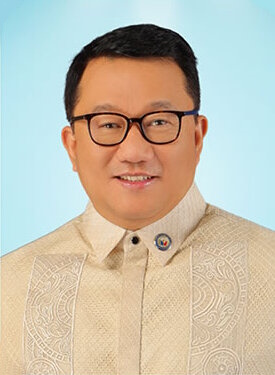
Chua's official portrait during the 19th Congress

=== Elections ===
In the 2022 elections, Chua ran for the congressional seat of Manila's 3rd district under the banner of Asenso Manileño, following the decision of incumbent Yul Servo Nieto to run as vice mayor. Chua defeated his opponent, former councilor Ramon Morales of PDP–Laban, by a significant margin.

In 2024, after the announcement of their former ally Isko Moreno's candidacy against Lacuna's re-election bid, Chua stated that he and his group felt 'betrayed', as Moreno ran for mayor in 2025. But while Moreno met with some barangay officials for lunch, he accused Chua of shouting at him while they were in a meeting, saying, 'Di bale nang matalo kami sa iba, wag lang sa'yo!' (transl. "It doesn't matter if we lose to others, just not to you!"). In 2025, Chua faced Moreno's congressional bet and councilor Apple Nieto, the sister of Vice Mayor Yul Servo. During the campaign, Vice President Sara Duterte endorsed Nieto while speaking negatively of Chua. Despite the vice president's verbal attacks, Chua defeated Nieto in the election, winning a second term in Congress.

=== Tenure ===
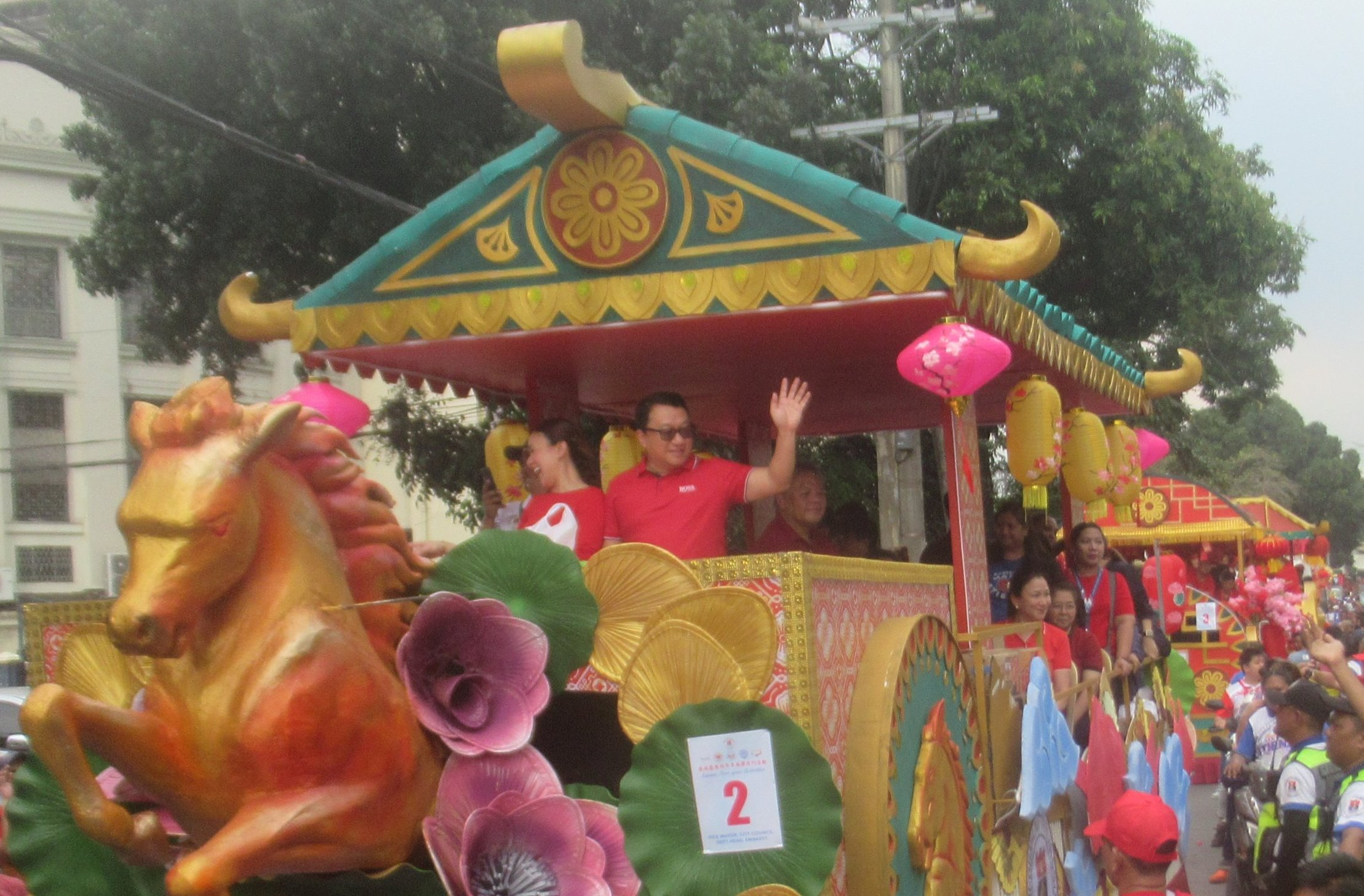
Chua and Manila Vice Mayor Chi Atienza on a motorcade in Manila during Chinese New Year 2026

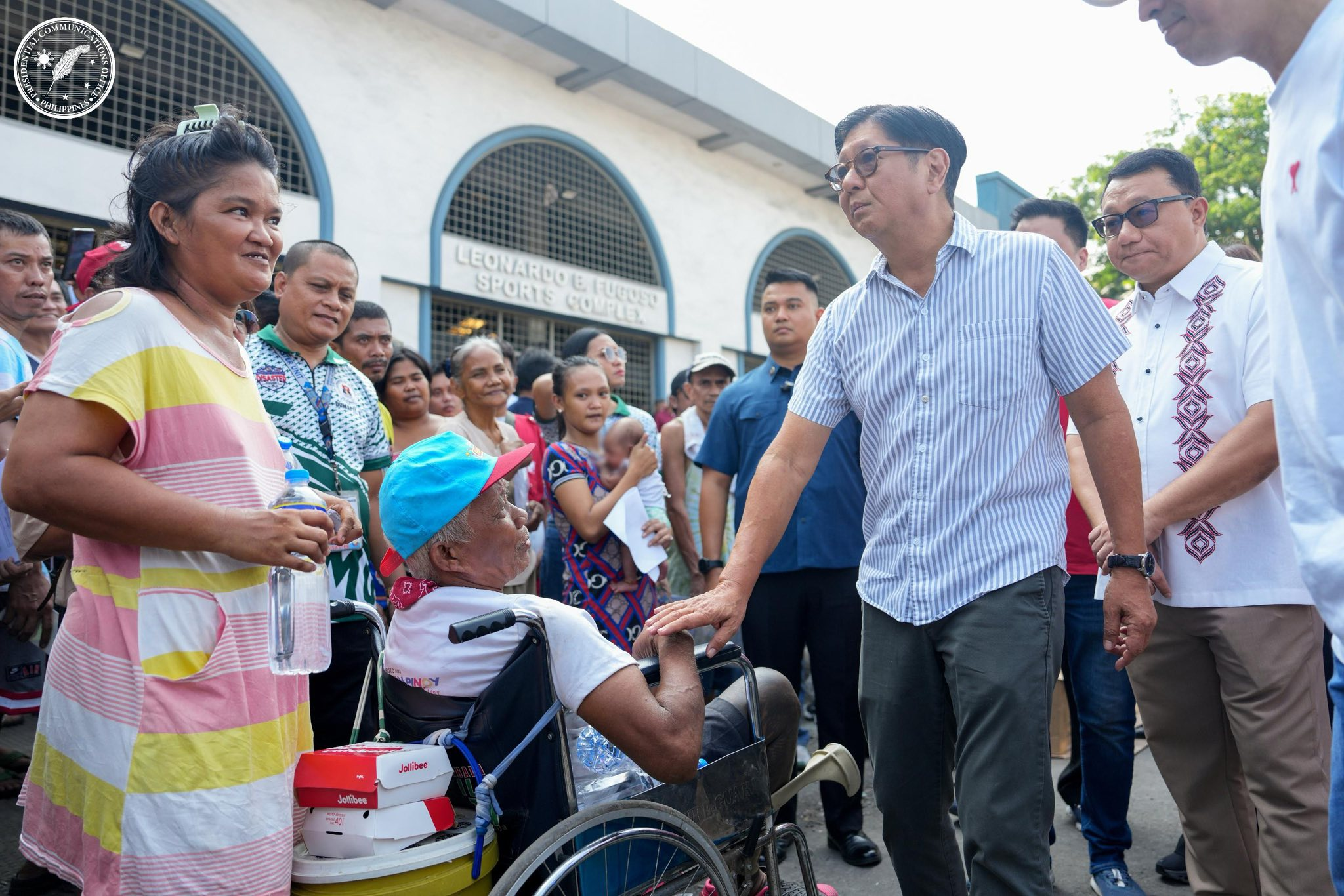
Chua joins President Bongbong Marcos and the DSWD aiding Parola fire victims in San Nicolas, Manila, May 2026

As a congressman, Chua has authored and co-authored several bills, including measures to waive college entrance examination fees for underprivileged students, regulate the operations of motorcycles-for-hire, including Angkas, and establish the Maharlika Investment Fund, a sovereign wealth fund for the Philippines.

Chua was the only congressman from Manila to vote in favor of the divorce bill. In 2023, he called for the abolishment of the Metro Manila Development Authority, describing it as "disruptive" and that its responsibilities are better off handled by national agencies and local government units. In September 2024, Chua was named Chairman of the House Committee on Good Government and Public Accountability. He also serves as the vice chairperson of the House Committee on Public Accounts.

Being a critic of Vice President Sara Duterte, he voted for the impeachment and was nominated to be one of the prosecutors for the impeachment trial.

=== Party affiliations ===
Chua has been affiliated with several political parties throughout his career. He initially joined the original Lakas–CMD in 2007 and the party was later merged with Kabalikat ng Malayang Pilipino (KAMPI) to become Lakas–Kampi–CMD (now the second iteration of Lakas–CMD) in 2008. He later switched to Pwersa ng Masang Pilipino (PMP) in 2009 and became part of Lito Atienza's ticket for the latter's unsuccessful mayoral comeback bid in 2010. He later became a member of the United Nationalist Alliance (UNA) from 2012 to 2016, during which he supported Joseph Estrada, who was elected mayor in 2013. He joined the local party Asenso Manileño in 2013, eventually becoming a member of Aksyon Demokratiko (the new national affiliation of then-Asenso leader and Manila Mayor Isko Moreno) ahead of the 2022 elections. He rejoined Lakas–CMD as his new national affiliation in July 2024. He later defected from the Lakas–CMD and joined the National Unity Party (NUP) in 2026.

== Personal life ==
Chua is married to Eiline Buenaventura, and they have three children. He grew up in Quiapo, Manila, as the eldest and only son among three siblings. His sister, Grace Chua, also a lawyer, succeeded him as a city councilor in 2016.

== Electoral history ==
Electoral history of Joel Chua
Year	Office	Party	Votes received				Result
Year	Office	Party	Total	%	P.	Swing	Result
2007	Councilor (3rd district)	Lakas	31,728		4th	—N/a	Won
2010	Councilor (3rd district)	PMP	46,561	9.34	5th	—N/a	Won
2013	Councilor (3rd district)	UNA	51,603		3rd	—N/a	Won
2019	Councilor (3rd district)	Asenso	49,515		4th	—N/a	Won
2022	Representative (Manila–3rd)	Asenso	68,946	67.78	1st	—N/a	Won
2025	Representative (Manila–3rd)	Lakas	55,007	47.83	1st	—N/a	Won

== Controversies ==
On February 16, 2013, months before the election, police arrested and detained Chua, three other incumbent councilors including Yul Servo, vice mayor Isko Moreno, and former councilor Manuel Zarcal due to alleged bingo operations in Santa Cruz, Manila, and a lack of permit. They were released on the next day and the gambling charges were eventually dismissed by the Department of Justice due to lack of evidence and vague allegations.

Chua's clash against erstwhile ally, Manila Mayor Isko Moreno, continued during their second terms in 2025, mainly over Chua's infrastructure projects. In July 2025, a barangay hall of Barangay 313, located on the sidewalk next to Arellano High School along T. Alonzo Street in Santa Cruz, Manila, was demolished for Building Code violations and lack of legal permits. Another project, the demolition of structures for a proposed community center in Barangay 334, also in Santa Cruz, was halted the following month for lacking permits. Chua accused Moreno of political bias and called him a “bully,” while Moreno denied the accusation, stating that he had approved the projects of two other Asenso-allied congressmen and Chua's project violated urban planning standards. On August 31, Moreno and Chua have decided to reconcile after meeting at the former's office at the Manila City Hall, committing to the best interests of their constituents.
