= Zenaida Angping =

Filipina politician

The Honorable Zenaida Angping
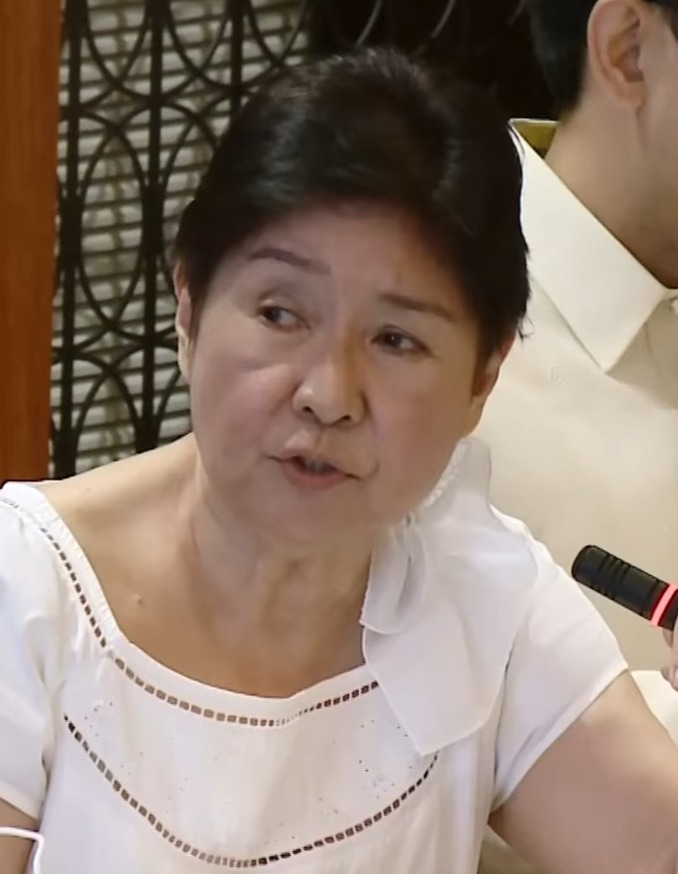

Ambassador of the Philippines to France
- Designate
- Assuming office TBD
- President: Bongbong Marcos
- Succeeding: Junever M. Mahilum-West

Secretary of the Presidential Management Staff
- Ad interim
- In office June 30, 2022 – December 2, 2022
- Preceded by: Jesus Melchor Quitain
- Succeeded by: Elaine T. Masukat

Member of the Philippine House of Representatives from Manila's 3rd congressional district
- In office June 30, 2007 – June 30, 2016
- Preceded by: Miles Roces
- Succeeded by: Yul Servo Nieto

Personal details
- Born: Ma. Zenaida Arteche Benedicto
- Party: Lakas (2018–present)
- Other political affiliations: NPC (until 2018)
- Spouse: Harry Angping

Maria Zenaida "Naida" Arteche Benedicto Angping is a Filipina politician who served as the secretary of the Presidential Management Staff (PMS) from June 30, 2022, to December 2, 2022, under the administration of President Bongbong Marcos. She previously represented Manila's 3rd congressional district in the House of Representatives from 2007 to 2016.

== Early life and education ==
Before entering politics, Zenaida Benedicto gained prominence as a beauty pageant contestant and was crowned Miss Caltex on December 19, 1969.

Angping later became a close aide to Leyte Governor Benjamin Romualdez, the brother of Imelda Marcos. During the term of her husband Harry between 1998 and 2004, she was the vice president of the Congressional Spouses Foundation Inc.

== Political career ==
=== House of Representatives ===
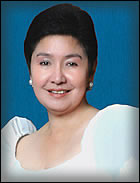
Official portrait during the 16th Congress

Angping served as the representative of Manila's 3rd congressional district from 2007 to 2016.

In the 2004 Philippine House of Representatives elections, she was initially considered a substitute candidate for her husband, Harry Angping, following his withdrawal from the race. However, the substitution was disallowed due to her husband’s disqualification on citizenship issues, and Miles Roces was declared the winner.

Angping attempted a political comeback in the 2019 Manila local elections but was defeated by her successor, Yul Servo.

=== Presidential Management Staff ===
She was selected to head the Presidential Management Staff as its secretary under the administration of President Bongbong Marcos. On December 2, 2022, Angping requested for "some personal time off," which the president granted; she would later officially quit from the post in January 2023 for personal reasons.

=== Diplomatic Appointment ===
On January 13, 2023, President Bongbong Marcos nominated Angping as Ambassador Extraordinary and Plenipotentiary to the French Republic. The Commission on Appointments received her nomination on January 17, 2023.

== Personal life ==
Zenaida Angping is married to former Manila 3rd District Representative Harry Angping.

House of Representatives of the Philippines
Preceded by Miles Roces	Member of the House of Representatives from Manila's 3rd district 2007–2016	Succeeded by Yul Servo
Political offices
Preceded by Jesus Melchor Quitain	Head of the Presidential Management Staff; 2022	Succeeded by Elaine Masukat; Officer-in-Charge (OIC)
Diplomatic posts
Preceded by Junever M. Mahilum-West	Ambassador of the Philippines to France; TBD	Designate
