= Yul Servo =

Filipino actor, visual artist and politician (born 1977)

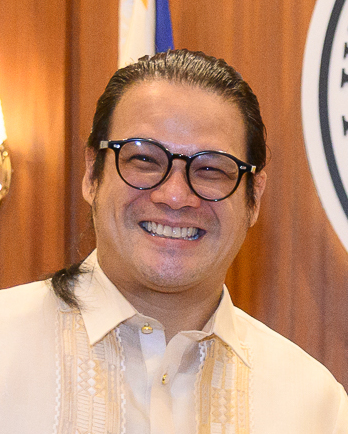
- Servo in 2024

35th Vice Mayor of Manila
- In office June 30, 2022 – June 30, 2025
- Mayor: Honey Lacuna
- Preceded by: Honey Lacuna
- Succeeded by: Chi Atienza

Chair of the House Committee on Youth and Sports Development
- In office October 6, 2020 – June 30, 2021
- Preceded by: Eric Martinez

Member of the Philippine House of Representatives from Manila's 3rd congressional district
- In office June 30, 2016 – June 30, 2022
- Preceded by: Zenaida Angping
- Succeeded by: Joel Chua

Member of the Manila City Council from the 3rd district
- In office June 30, 2007 – June 30, 2016

Deputy Leader of Asenso Manileño
- Incumbent
- Assumed office August 6, 2024
- Party Leader: Honey Lacuna
- Preceded by: Honey Lacuna

Personal details
- Born: John Marvin Cruz Nieto; February 22, 1977 (age 49) Calumpit, Bulacan, Philippines
- Party: Lakas (2024–present); Asenso Manileño (local party; 2015–present)
- Other political affiliations: Aksyon (2021–2024); PDP–Laban (2007–2009; 2016–2021); PMP (2015–2016); UNA (2012–2015); Nacionalista (2009–2012)
- Spouse: Flovelyn Nieto
- Children: 5
- Education: Philippine College of Criminology (BS)
- Occupation: Actor; politician; visual artist
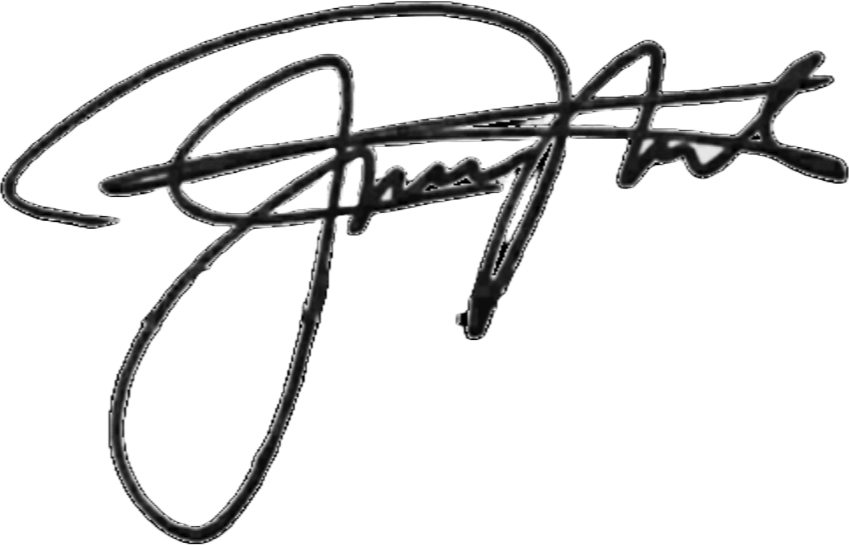
- Signature

John Marvin "Yul Servo" Cruz Nieto (Note: Servo is known as Yul Servo Nieto during his political career. He still uses the name Yul Servo for his acting career.) (born February 22, 1977) is a Filipino actor and politician who has served as the 34th Vice Mayor of Manila from 2022 to 2025.

== Early life and education ==
Nieto, nicknamed "Jon-Jon" as a child, was born in Calumpit, Bulacan, and was raised in Binondo, Manila. Nieto's father, Glenn Martin Romano Nieto (born 1952), is an architect by profession who used to own a tailoring shop and served as a city councilor from 1988 to 1995. His mother was Zenaida Cruz Nieto (1948–2024). The second of eight children in a Manila middle-class family, Nieto studied and graduated from the Philippine College of Criminology to become a policeman but was pushed into acting by his maternal uncle.

== Entertainment career ==
Servo entered show business in 2001. His stage name Yul Servo was chosen by director Maryo J. de los Reyes in homage to Russian actor Yul Brynner and Servo being the name of the head waiter in the restaurant de los Reyes frequented. He initially wanted his stage name as Ador Papa, after a famous swimmer, but agreed to the stage name given by the director. Servo started his career as a theater actor. Servo's notable films include Batang West Side (2001), Laman (2002), Naglalayag (2004), Torotot, and Brutus (2008). Several of Servo's notable acting accolades include winning the Best Actor award for Naglalayag at the 2004 Brussels Independent Film Festival, an international award-giving body based in Belgium.

Following his loss in the 2025 Manila local elections, which ended his 18-year political stint in the city, he returned to show business through GMA Network's TV series My Father's Wife.

== Political career ==
Servo entered politics in 2007 with his election to the Manila City Council. Upon being term-limited during his third term, Servo was elected to the House of Representatives in 2016 to represent Manila's 3rd congressional district in the chamber, being reelected to a second term in 2019.

Although he was one of the actors who appeared on some of the programs of ABS-CBN, he is among the 70 representatives who voted "yes" to "kill" (reject) the franchise renewal of the said network, the largest in the Philippines. A former heavy smoker himself and quitter, Servo is also the proponent of the Smoke-Free Environment Bill which aims to create more public places for people to be free from the dangers of second-hand smoke.

Servo was later elected vice mayor of Manila in 2022 under the local party Asenso Manileño. He was the running mate of then-vice mayor Honey Lacuna, who was elected mayor.

As vice mayor, Servo highlighted the Manila City Council’s efforts to improve transparency by launching a website to access the city's ordinances and establishing a legislative team to develop new ordinances. During his tenure, the city council has approved 185 ordinances and 1,119 resolutions as of August 2024. He also emphasized his near-perfect attendance record, missing only one session as vice mayor due to late arrival on August 22, 2024. He ran for re-election in 2025, but lost to Chi Atienza.

== Controversies ==
On February 16, 2013, months before the election, police arrested and detained Servo, fellow councilor Joel Chua, two other incumbent councilors, former councilor Manuel Zarcal, and vice mayor Isko Moreno due to alleged bingo operations held in a public place in Santa Cruz, Manila, and a lack of permit. Moreno claimed Mayor Alfredo Lim was behind his arrest, which Lim denied, and they asserted that the bingo game was not illegal as it involved no wagers, was held in a private compound, and aimed to entertain attendees of a consultation program. They were released a day later, and the gambling charges were eventually dismissed by the Department of Justice due to lack of evidence and vague allegations. The police complainants also failed to cite a particular provision of the law that was violated.

In August 2024, members of the Manila City Council allied with former Mayor Isko Moreno filed an injunction against Servo, Majority Floor Leader Ernesto Isip Jr., Minority Floor Leader Philip Lacuna, and 19 other councilors allied with incumbent Mayor Honey Lacuna for allegedly conducting a session during recess on July 23, when the city government declared all work to be suspended in view of Typhoon Carina. The Moreno allies who filed the suit condemned the meeting as being "illegal and secret", noting that ₱83 million city council funds were transferred to the office of the mayor during the meeting. Servo belied the suit and said that the session was livestreamed.

In September 2024, Manila Sangguniang Kabataan Federation President Juliana Rae “Yanyan” Ibay filed with the Ombudsman a complaint against Servo and the city councilors for violation of the Local Government Code and the Sangguniang Kabataan Act of 2015. The case stemmed from her alleged illegal ouster as youth committee chairwoman during a ‘secret session.'

== Personal life ==
Servo is married to Flovelyn Lola and has six children. Their son Lucas (born 1998) was the third nominee of Juan Pinoy Partylist for the 2025 election, where it ran unsuccessfully.

Outside acting and politics, Servo is an avid skateboarding fan and rides the skateboard. Servo is good friends with fellow actor Piolo Pascual, who is also the godfather to four of Servo's children.

== Electoral history ==
Electoral history of Yul Servo
Year	Office	Party		Votes received				Result
Year	Office	Local	National	Total	%	P.	Swing	Result
2007	Councilor (Manila–3rd district)	—N/a	PDP–Laban	31,220	—N/a	5th	—N/a	Won
2010	Councilor (Manila–3rd district)	—N/a	Nacionalista	60,301	12.10%	2nd	—N/a	Won
2013	Councilor (Manila–3rd district)	—N/a	UNA	61,028	—N/a	1st	—N/a	Won
2016	Representative (Manila–3rd district)	Asenso	PMP	46,353	44.93%	1st	—N/a	Won
2019	Representative (Manila–3rd district)	Asenso	PDP–Laban	65,153	67.81%	1st	—N/a	Won
2022	Vice Mayor of Manila	Asenso	Aksyon	586,855	73.67%	1st	—N/a	Won
2025	Vice Mayor of Manila	Asenso	Lakas	249,691	28.49%	2nd	—N/a	Lost

== Filmography ==
=== Film ===
Year	Title	Role
2001	Batang West Side	Hanzel Harana
2002	Laman	Dodong
2004	Naglalayag	Noah Garcia
2005	Ilusyon	Miguel
2008	Brutus, Ang Paglalakbay	
2008	Torotot (Destierro)	Gabby
2010	Rosario	Vicente Velez
2011	Manila Kingpin: The Asiong Salonga Story	Bimbo
2012	El Presidente	Pedro Paterno
2013	Porno	Xander
2017	Kiko Boksingero	

=== Television ===
Year	Title	Role	Ref.
2001–2003	Sa Puso Ko Iingatan Ka	Epoy	
2002–2003	Habang Kapiling Ka	Nonoy Bautista	
2005	Kampanerang Kuba	Antonio	
2006	Calla Lily	Ramil	
2007	Maria Flordeluna	Danillo Ferrer	
2008	Maalaala Mo Kaya: Bisikleta	Piano	
2008–2009	LaLola	Matias	
2009	Rosalinda	Roberto	
2009	Zorro	Samurai	
2010	Sine Novela Presents: Mars Ravelo's Trudis Liit	Lando	
2010–2011	Jillian: Namamasko Po	Roberto	
2011	Carlo J. Caparas' Bangis	Don Dominador Serpente Jr.	
2012	Biritera	Jerome Macapagal	
2013	Anna Karenina	Kadyo	
2014	Kambal Sirena	Damos	
2015	Baker King	Manager Henry Lee	
2016	Pepito Manaloto	Francis Might	
2016	Oh, My Mama!	Roberto Reyes	
2017	Magpakailanman: Love Is Complicated: The Edgar Mendoza Story	Colonel Danny	
2018	The Cure	Pia's father	
2018	Tadhana: Mabuting Anak	Philip	
2018	Maalaala Mo Kaya: Sementeryo	Kokoy	
2019	Ipaglaban Mo: Ingrata	Dado	
2019	Magpakailanman: Yanig ng Buhay - The Pampanga Earthquake Victims Story	Jason	
2019	Sahaya	Nolan del Sol	
2024	Black Rider	Miguel Rosales	
2025	My Father's Wife	Marcelino "Marcel/Jun" Santos Jr.	

== Acting awards and nominations ==
Year	Award giving body	Category	Nominated work	Results
2001	Cinemanila International Film Festival	Best Actor	Batang West Side	Won
2004	Brussels Independent Film Festival (International competition)	Best Actor	Naglalayag	Won
2005	FAMAS Award	Best Actor	Naglalayag	Nominated
2008	Brussels Independent Film Festival	Best Actor	Torotot (Destierro)	Won
2008	Brussels Independent Film Festival	Best Actor	Brutus, Ang Paglalakbay	Won
2008	Cinemalaya Philippine Independent Film Festival	Best Supporting Actor (Balanghai Trophy)	Brutus, Ang Paglalakbay	Won

== Notes ==
House of Representatives of the Philippines
Preceded by Zenaida Angping	Member of the House of Representatives from Manila's 3rd district 2016–2022	Succeeded by Joel Chua
Political offices
Preceded by Honey Lacuna	Vice Mayor of Manila; 2022–2025	Succeeded by Chi Atienza
Party political offices
Preceded by Honey Lacuna	Asenso Manileño nominee for Vice Mayor of Manila; 2022, 2025	Most recent
Preceded by Honey Lacuna	Deputy Leader of Asenso Manileño; 2024–present	Incumbent
