= Philippine Sports Institute =

Sports training organization

- Active: 1996–1998; 2005–2009; 2016–
- Parent institution: Philippine Sports Commission
- National Training Director: Marc Velasco
- Location: Pasig, Metro Manila, Philippines

The Philippine Sports Institute (PSI) is a sports training organization in the Philippines. It is under the Philippine Sports Commission.

== History ==
The Philippine Sports Institute (PSI) was first launched in May 1996 as the Philippine Institute of Sports (PhilSports). Then President Fidel Ramos instructed then Philippine Sports Commission (PSC) Chairman Philip Ella Juico to form the sports institute which was inaugurated on November that year. With the help of former PSC Chairman Perry Mequi, Philsports organized various programs. It was disestablished in 1998 by Juico's successor. Under the Republic Act 6847 of 1990, the PSC is mandated to run a sports institute alongside of maintaining a Philippine Sports Hall of Fame.

The sports institute was briefly revived in 2005 by PSC Chairman William Ramirez under the administration of then President Gloria Macapagal Arroyo but was made defunct by Ramirez's successor. When Ramirez was appointed once again to the post by President Rodrigo Duterte, the organization was revived once again.

The PSI was reestablished two weeks before September 16, 2016. The sports institute was patterned after the Canberra based Australian Institute of Sport. Marc Velasco was appointed as the first national training director of the PSI since its revival.

On January 16, 2017, the PSI was formally launched at the PhilSports Arena. President Rodrigo Duterte was supposed to lead the ceremony, but did not make it due to prior commitments. Instead, Cabinet Secretary Leoncio Evasco was sent as the President's representative in the ceremony. PSC Chairman William Ramirez led the relaunch with Philippine Olympic Committee President Peping Cojuangco also in attendance.

== Programs ==
With support from the United States Sports Academy, the PSI will provide Filipino officials international courses on sports management, coaching, and physical education.
