= Philippine Sports Commission =

Philippine government agency

- Komisyon sa Isports ng Pilipinas
- Official seal

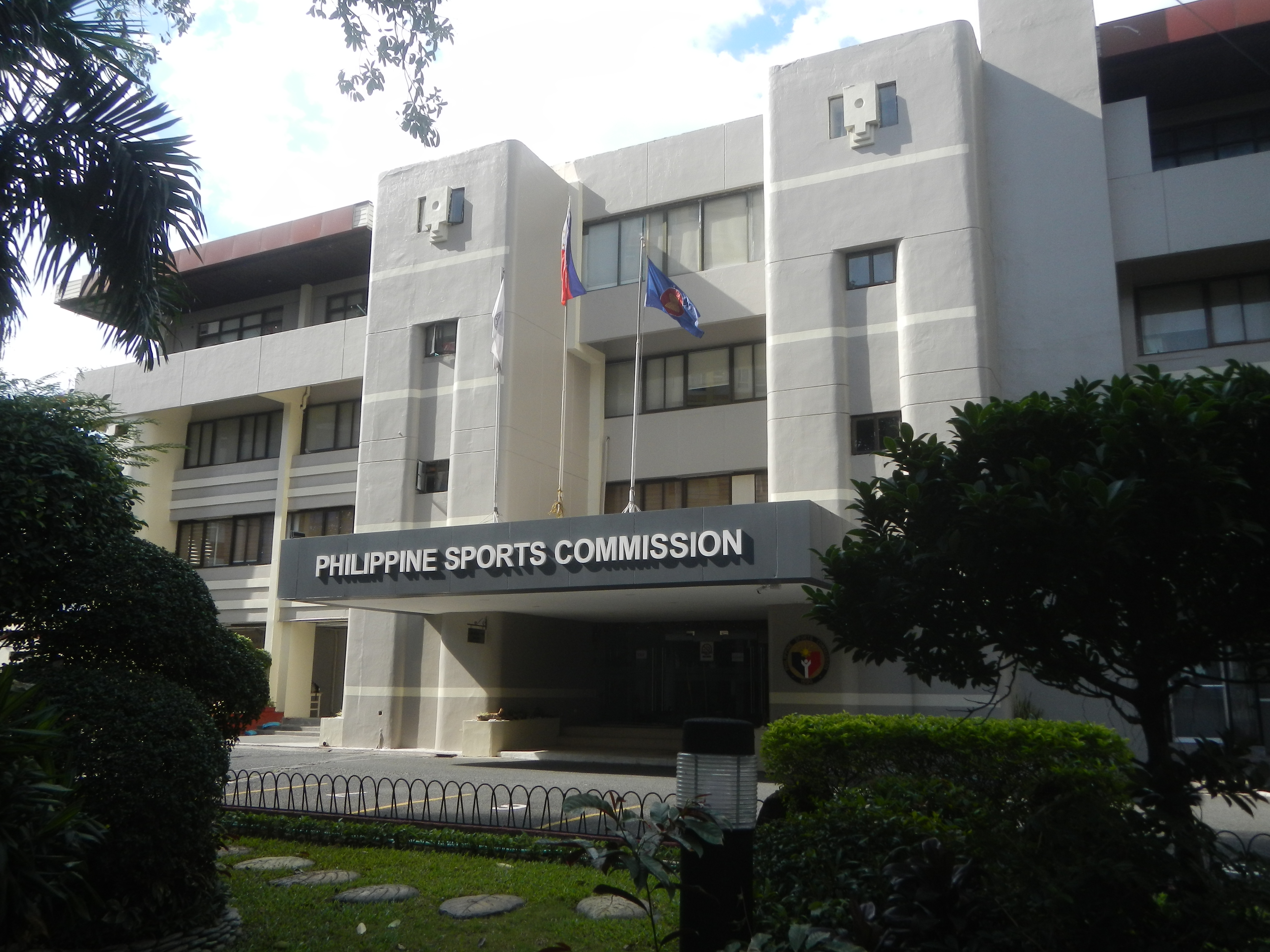

Agency overview
- Formed: February 12, 1990
- Headquarters: Rizal Memorial Sports Complex, Malate, Manila, Philippines
- Employees: 105 (2024)
- Agency executive: Patrick Gregorio, Chairperson
- Parent Agency: Office of the President of the Philippines
- Website: www.psc.gov.ph

The Philippine Sports Commission (PSC; Filipino: Komisyon sa Isports ng Pilipinas) is an agency of the Philippine government that tackles matters concerning sports in the country. The sports agency is independent from the Philippine Olympic Committee, a privately-ran organization that enjoys autonomy from the government.

== History ==
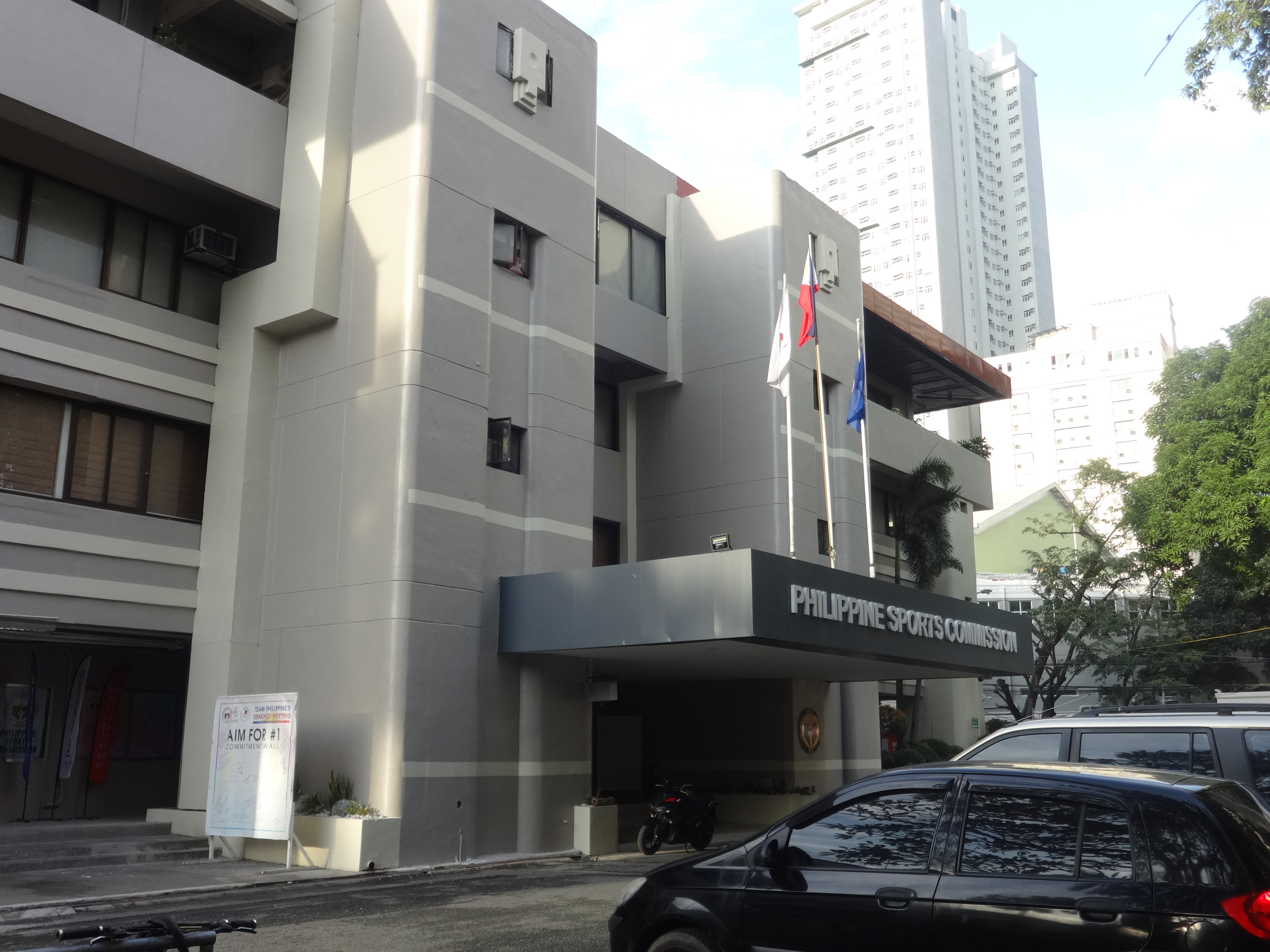
Facade of the PSC Administrative Building

The Philippine Sports Commission was created through Republic Act No. 6847 or "The Philippine Sports Commission Act". The charter was signed by then-President Corazon Aquino on January 24, 1990.

== Relations ==
=== Philippine Olympic Committee ===
The Philippine Sports Commission Act recognizes the role of the Philippine Olympic Committee as the national Olympic body for the International Olympic Committee. It also recognizes the autonomy of the Philippine Olympic Committee and likewise states that all National Sports Associations shall be autonomous as well.

The Act designates the Philippine Olympic Committee as primarily responsible for activities related to the country's participation in the Olympic Games (International Olympic Committee), Asian Games (Olympic Council of Asia), Southeast Asian Games (Southeast Asian Games Federation), and other international athletic competitions.

=== Philippine National Anti-Doping Organization ===
The PSC funds the Philippine National Anti-Doping Organization (PHI-NADO), an organization in the Philippines which tackles doping in sports in the Philippines. PHI-NADO is recognized as the national anti-doping body for the Philippines by the World Anti Doping Agency (WADA).

The Philippines were under threat of sanctions by WADA in early 2024 due to non-compliance of the international body's regulations. This has since been resolved. There are moves to make PHI-NADO a more independent body from the PSC.

=== Others ===
The Philippine Sports Commission has a partnership with the United States Sports Academy (USSA) through a Protocol of Cooperation signed in 2017. In May 2018, the PSC entered into a partnership with the USSA where the latter will provide masters and doctorate degree certifications to Filipino sports officials. The Philippine government and the USSA had a similar program in the early 1980s during the administration of then-President Ferdinand Marcos.

The PSC has also relations with bodies from other countries such as Australia, Cuba, China, South Korea, Russia, and Spain to help the PSC develop sports in the country.

In August 2024, Supreme Court Justice Marvic Leonen granted Yeng Guiao's 2016 mandamus nullifying the Ramos-era Pagcor memorandum. It directed the Pagcor to remit 5% of its gross income per year to PSC from 1993. The PCSO was ordered to account and refund to the PSC, 30% charity fund from the six lottery draws annually, starting 2006.

== Leadership ==
=== Chairpersons ===
List of Philippine Sports Commission chairpersons
#	Chairman	Term		Appointed by
#	Chairman	From	To	Appointed by
1	Cecil Hechanova	1990	1992	Corazon Aquino
2	Aparicio Mequi	1992	1993	Fidel V. Ramos
3	Mel Lopez	1993	1996	Fidel V. Ramos
4	Philip Ella Juico	1996	June 30, 1998	Fidel V. Ramos
5	Carlos Tuazon	June 30, 1998	January 23, 2002	Joseph Estrada
6	Eric Buhain	January 23, 2002	June 8, 2005	Gloria Macapagal Arroyo
7	Butch Ramirez	June 8, 2005	January 23, 2009	Gloria Macapagal Arroyo
8	Harry Angping	January 23, 2009	June 30, 2010	Gloria Macapagal Arroyo
9	Richie Garcia	June 30, 2010	June 30, 2016	Benigno Aquino III
10	Butch Ramirez	June 30, 2016	June 30, 2022	Rodrigo Duterte
OIC	Guillermo Iroy	June 30, 2022	August 30, 2022	Bongbong Marcos
11	Noli Eala	August 30, 2022	December 28, 2022	Bongbong Marcos
12	Richard Bachmann	December 28, 2022	July 1, 2025	Bongbong Marcos
13	Patrick Gregorio	June 28, 2025	Present	Bongbong Marcos

=== Composition ===
Chairman: Patrick Gregorio

Commissioners:

1. Olivia "Bong" Coo
2. Edward Hayco
3. Walter Torres
4. Matthew Gaston
- Term ends on June 30, 2028.

== See also ==
- Philippine Olympic Committee
- Philippine Sports Institute
- Philippine Sports Training Center
- Philippine Sports Hall of Fame
- Philippines at the Olympics
- Project Gintong Alay
- Siklab Atleta
