= Harry Angping =

Filipino politician

The Honorable Harry Angping

8th Chairman of the Philippine Sports Commission
- In office January 23, 2009 – June 30, 2010
- President: Gloria Macapagal Arroyo
- Preceded by: Butch Ramirez
- Succeeded by: Richie Garcia

Member of the Philippine House of Representatives from Manila's 3rd district
- In office June 30, 1998 – June 30, 2004
- Preceded by: Leonardo Fugoso
- Succeeded by: Miles Roces

Personal details
- Born: 12 January 1952 (age 74)
- Party: Nacionalista (2015–present)
- Other political affiliations: NPC (2001–2015); LAMMP (1998–2001); Lakas (1995–1998)
- Spouse: Zenaida Angping

Harry Angping (born 12 January 1952) is a Filipino politician who was a former member of the House of Representatives of the Philippines. He is also a former chairman of the Philippine Sports Commission.

== Political career ==
Angping formerly served as a member of the House of Representatives of the Philippines representing the third district of the city of Manila from 1998 to 2004. When he ran in the 1998 and 2001 elections, his citizenship was questioned by political rivals alleging him to not have Filipino citizenship but the Comelec ruled in his favor. Running under the Koalisyon ng Nagkakaisang Pilipino, he campaigned to secure for a third consecutive term as Congressman but withdrew from the elections in May 2004. Again his citizenship was disputed. Despite Angping believing that he has a strong case, he decided to be substituted by his wife, Zenaida Angping.

Under the presidency of Gloria Macapagal Arroyo, he served as special envoy to China for tourism and investment.

He ran for his former post as Congressman representing Manila's third district in 2016 but lost to Yul Servo Nieto.

== Sports administration ==
Angping was formerly the president of the Amateur Softball Association of the Philippines. He is one of the reported supporters of the Art Macapagal who ran against Peping Cojuangco for presidency of the Philippine Olympic Committee (POC) in 2008. Cojuangco was re-elected as POC president in the election.

He is appointed by then President Gloria Macapagal Arroyo as the 8th chairman of the Philippine Sports Commission (PSC) in January 2009.

In 2013, Angping and Edmund Montanes, president of Philcare Manpower Services, a janitorial firm, was charged with graft before the Sandiganbayan for the alleged connivance of the two in hiring 80 personnel without public bidding and authority from the PSC board in 2009. In December 2018, they were acquitted of their graft charges by the Sandiganbayan.

House of Representatives of the Philippines
Preceded by Leonardo Fugoso	Member of the House of Representatives from Manila's 3rd district 1998–2004	Succeeded by Miles Roces
