= Chinese bid for the 2019 FIBA Basketball World Cup =

Bid of China for the 2019 FIBA Basketball World Cup

Chinese bid
- for the 2019 FIBA World Cup

Bid details
- Bidding nation: China
- Bidding federation: Chinese Basketball Association
- Proposed venues: 8 (in 8 cities)
- Bidding decision: 7 August 2015 in Tokyo, Japan

Bid result
- Won

The Chinese Basketball Association (not to be confused with the basketball league of the same English-language name) was the successful bid for the right to host the 2019 FIBA Basketball World Cup. On 16 March 2015, the bid became a formal candidate together with the Philippines, as FIBA decided that the 2019 World Cup will be played in Asia. China officially won the bid against the Philippines on 7 August 2015.

== Timeline ==
| Date | Notes |
|---|---|
| 30 August-15 September 2014 | Observers Programme at the 2014 FIBA Basketball World Cup in Spain |
| 11 December 2014 | FIBA announced the 6 shortlisted nations. |
| 15–16 December 2014 | Workshop in Geneva, Switzerland |
| March 2015 | On-site inspection of probable venues in China. |
| 16 March 2015 | China's bid listed as a candidate, together with the Philippines. |
| April 2015 | Submission of final candidature files |
| 7 August 2015 | FIBA announced that China will be hosting the 2019 World Cup |

== Details ==
A number of sites were proposed as venues for the Basketball World Cup.

FIBA underlined some requirements for the venues to be used:

- There should be at least a minimum of 4-5 venues; 2 venues for the knock-out stage
- A press center 150 pax for the group stage and 300 pax for the final round, 2 square meters per person

== Venues ==
There are eight venues proposed by the Chinese bid committee:

| Mainland China | Beijing | Dongguan | Guangzhou | Foshan |
|---|---|---|---|---|
Chinese bid for the 2019 FIBA Basketball World Cup is located in China
| Chinese bid for the 2019 FIBA Basketball World Cup is located in China | MasterCard Center; Capacity: 18,000 | Dongguan Basketball Center; Capacity: 16,000 | Guangzhou International Sports Arena; Capacity: 18,000 | Foshan Metro Sports Arena; Capacity:14,700 (new venue) |
| Guangdong | Nanjing | Shenzhen | Suzhou (Note: Suzhou was originally among the eight host cities proposed by China when it won its bid. Suzhou was replaced by Shanghai with the change approved by the FIBA Central Board in early 2016. Shanghai is subject to a positive evaluation in April 2016.) | Wuhan |
Chinese bid for the 2019 FIBA Basketball World Cup is located in Guangdong
| Chinese bid for the 2019 FIBA Basketball World Cup is located in Guangdong | Youth Olympic Sports Park Gymnasium; Capacity: 20,000 | Shenzhen Universiade Sports Center Gymnasium; Capacity: 18,000 | Suzhou Industrial Park Sports Center; Capacity: 13,000 (new venue) | Wuhan Sports Center Gymnasium; Capacity: 13,000 |
