= Argentina–Uruguay bid for the 2023 FIBA Basketball World Cup =

Argentina–Uruguay bid
- for the 2023 FIBA Basketball World Cup
- Bidding Logo

Bid details
- Bidding nations: Argentina; Uruguay
- Bidding federations: Argentine Basketball Federation; Uruguayan Basketball Federation
- Proposed venues: 5 (in 5 cities)
- Bidding decision: 9 December 2017 in Mies, Switzerland

Bid result
- Lost to Philippines-Japan-Indonesia's Bid

The joint Argentina–Uruguay bid for the 2023 FIBA Basketball World Cup was the Argentine Basketball Federation and Uruguayan Basketball Federation's unsuccessful joint bid for the right to host the 2023 FIBA Basketball World Cup.

The campaign was led by Argentina, where most of the proposed venues were situated. The bid was one of the two finalist bids, along with the joint Philippines–Japan–Indonesia winning bid.

== Background ==
On January 11, 2017, the joint bid was announced in Buenos Aires, by the Argentine Basketball Federation and the Uruguayan Basketball Federation. The bid was launched by Argentine politician Esteban Bullrich, footballer Fernando Cáceres, and bid presidents Federico Susbielles and Ricardo Vairo. On May 22, 2017, the bid team unveiled its candidature logo and slogan: "Two Countries, One Passion" (Spanish: "Dos países, una pasión"), in Montevideo.

According to media reports, Buenos Aires would have been the host to four Preliminary Round Groups, two Second Round Groups, and the Final tournament phase, from the Quarterfinals onward. Montevideo would have been the host to two Preliminary Round Groups and two Second Round Groups.

== Proposed venues ==
Five venues, from five host cities were proposed for the bid.

Location of proposed venues for the losing Argentina–Uruguay bid for the 2023 FIBA Basketball World Cup.	Argentina			
Location of proposed venues for the losing Argentina–Uruguay bid for the 2023 FIBA Basketball World Cup.	Buenos Aires	Mendoza	Córdoba	Mar del Plata
Location of proposed venues for the losing Argentina–Uruguay bid for the 2023 FIBA Basketball World Cup.	Estadio Mary Terán de Weiss Capacity: 15,500	Villa Panamericana (new venue); Capacity: 12,800	Orfeo Superdomo Capacity: 14,000	Polideportivo Islas Malvinas Capacity: 8,000
Location of proposed venues for the losing Argentina–Uruguay bid for the 2023 FIBA Basketball World Cup.	Uruguay			
Location of proposed venues for the losing Argentina–Uruguay bid for the 2023 FIBA Basketball World Cup.	Montevideo			
Location of proposed venues for the losing Argentina–Uruguay bid for the 2023 FIBA Basketball World Cup.	Antel Arena (new venue); Capacity: 15,000			

== Bid presentation ==
The bid was presented on October 17, 2017, in Buenos Aires.

== Aftermath ==
Argentina + Uruguay bid banner, based on the flags of the bidding countries, as presented by the bid delegation in Mies, Switzerland.

On December 9, 2017, FIBA decided to award the hosting rights of the 2023 FIBA Basketball World Cup to the Philippines, Japan, and Indonesia, over Argentina and Uruguay, following the final bid presentation, that was held on the same day, in Mies, Switzerland. However, citing the quality of the two joint-bids, FIBA decided to give Argentina and Uruguay the chance to make an unopposed bid for the 2027 FIBA Basketball World Cup. They were told to make adjustments to their original bid, as recommended by FIBA, and were scheduled to represent their new bid to the basketball world body in June 2018; after which FIBA was to decide if it would award the hosting rights for the 2027 edition of the tournament to the two South American countries.

However, Argentina and Uruguay ultimately decided not to pursue a bid for the 2027 FIBA Basketball World Cup, on 24 May 2018. On 28 April 2023, the 20th edition was awarded to Qatar.

== See also ==
- 2017 FIBA AmeriCup
