= Patrick Gregorio =

Filipino sporting official (born 1967 or 1968)

13th Chairperson of the Philippine Sports Commission
- Incumbent
- Assumed office July 1, 2025
- President: Bongbong Marcos
- Preceded by: Dickie Bachmann

Personal details
- Born: Patrick Gregorio; July 22, 1966 (age 60)
- Education: University of the Philippines Diliman (BS)

Patrick "Pato" C. Gregorio is a Filipino businessman, hotelier, and sports executive who has served as the chairperson of the Philippine Sports Commission since 2025.

== Early life and education ==
Born in 1967 or 1968, Patrick Gregorio is the eldest son of University of the Philippines (UP) Spanish professor Martin Verdeprado Gregorio and Lucille Kapunan. Gregorio attended the University of the Philippines Diliman, where he earned a bachelor's degree of tourism from the Asian Institute of Tourism. During his undergraduate years at UP Diliman, he also became a member of the UP Alpha Sigma.

== Career ==
=== Hotel management ===
Gregorio was the youngest general manager of the Manila Hotel and president of Waterfront Hotels and Resorts, which include the Waterfront Cebu City Hotel & Casino. He has been the head of hospitality and lifestyle ventures with Landco Lifestyle Ventures (LLV) since early 2025.

=== Sports administration ===
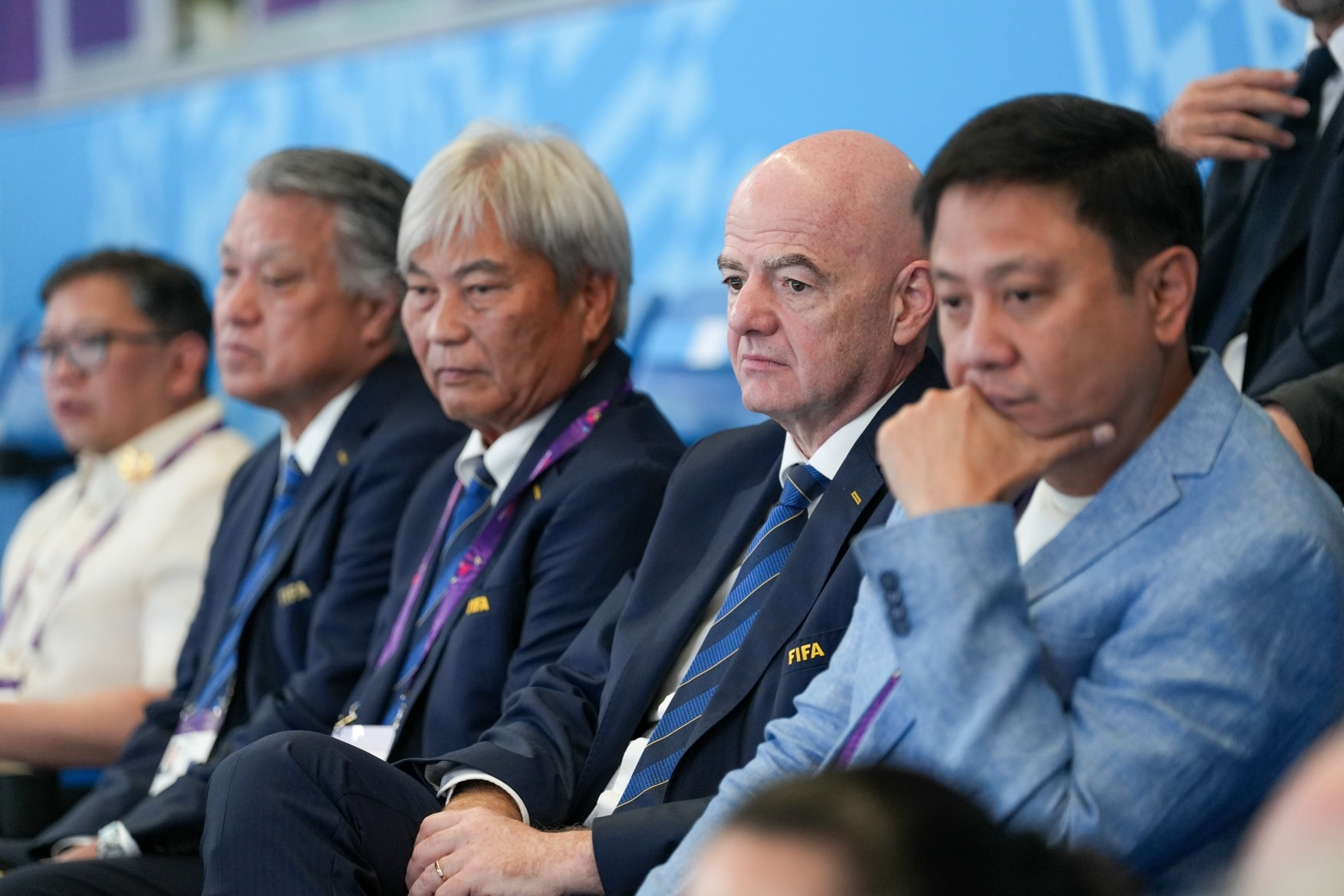
Gregorio with FIFA president Gianni Infantino, FIFA Council members Mariano Araneta and Kozo Tashima, and PFF president John Gutierrez (R-L) at the 2025 FIFA Futsal Women's World Cup in Pasig

Gregorio was president of the Philippine Rowing Association (PRA).

Gregorio became the chairperson of the Philippine Basketball Association during the 2014–15 season. He has also headed Smart Communications' sports marketing arm.

Private firm DuckWorld PH also has Gregorio as its chairperson. In collaboration with the Metro Pacific Tollways Corporation, it relaunched the Tour of Luzon in 2025.

==== Philippine Sports Commission ====
On July 1, 2025, Gregorio assumed the position of chairperson of the Philippine Sports Commission, succeeding Dickie Bachmann. The PRA will hold an election to determine its next president after Gregorio's appointment to the PSC.

Gregorio proposed that the Philippines could bid to host the 2033 World Games during a meeting with International World Games Association president José Perurena López and chief executive officer Joachim Gossow on August 9, 2025.

On October 29, 2025, President Bongbong Marcos created the National Sports Tourism Inter-Agency Committee which Gregorio as the PSC chairperson was tasked to head.

His role with the NST-IAC helped the organization of the Philippines' first WTA 125 tournament, the 2026 Philippine Women's Open in January.
