= Philippine–Japanese–Indonesian bid for the 2023 FIBA Basketball World Cup =

Bid for the 2023 FIBA Basketball World Cup

Philippine–Japanese–Indonesian bid
- for the 2023 FIBA Basketball World Cup

Bid details
- Bidding nations: Philippines; Japan; Indonesia
- Bidding federations: Samahang Basketbol ng Pilipinas; Japan Basketball Association; Indonesian Basketball Association
- Proposed venues: 6 (in 6 cities)
- Bidding decision: December 9, 2017 in Mies, Switzerland

Bid result
- Won

The joint Philippine–Japanese–Indonesian bid for the 2023 FIBA Basketball World Cup was the Samahang Basketbol ng Pilipinas, Japan Basketball Association, and the Indonesian Basketball Association's successful bid for the right to host the 2023 FIBA Basketball World Cup.

The campaign was led by the Philippines where most of the proposed venues are situated. The bid was one of the two finalist bids, along with the joint Argentina–Uruguay bid.

== Background ==
=== Bid Development ===
==== Philippine-led initiatives ====
Following the failed bid to China, the Philippines as early as January 2016 expressed interest to make a joint bid for the 2023 FIBA World Cup with another country. The Philippines considered to make a joint bid with Malaysia, Singapore or South Korea.

==== Indonesia as co-bidding country ====
The bid was initially submitted as a joint bid by two countries; Philippines and Indonesia. It was submitted to FIBA on January 28, 2017 with the group stage proposed to be held in both countries and the Philippines solely host the final knockout phase.

==== Japan joins the co-bidding ====
The President of the Philippine Basketball Federation (SBP) Al Panlilio announced on February 6, 2017 that Japan was invited to join the Philippine-Indonesian bid. After the FIBA Board Meeting in May 2017 several media reported that Japan has joined the Philippine-Indonesian bid. Japan's participation in the bid was proposed by FIBA

According to media reports Manila will be host to four Preliminary Round Groups, two Second Round Groups and the Final tournament phase from Quarterfinals onwards. As well Okinawa and Jakarta will each be host to two Preliminary Round Groups and one Second Round Group.

==== Singapore ====
There were plans to have Singapore as the fourth co-bidding country in the joint bid. On May 25, 2017 SBP officials had a dialog with their counterparts from the Basketball Association of Singapore (BAS) about joining the bid. If Singapore joined the each venue would have stage two Preliminary Round Groups and one Second Round Group.

=== Bid rationale and theme ===
The bid focused on the passion for the game especially by fans from the primary hosting country, the Philippines, and the Consortium appealed to FIBA goal in growing the sport of basketball, with a combined population base of 500 million people. The bid revolved on the mottos "The Power of Three" and "Play Louder than Ever". Future infrastructure plans were also discussed during the bid presentation.

== Proposed venues ==
Six venues from six host cities were proposed for the bid.

Philippines
Bulacan	Metro Manila		
Bocaue	Quezon City	Pasay	Pasig
Philippine Arena; Capacity: 55,000	Smart Araneta Coliseum; Capacity: 15,959 (renovated venue)	Mall of Asia Arena; Capacity: 15,000	PhilSports Arena; Capacity: 10,000
Location of the venues for the 2023 FIBA Basketball World Cup		Venues within Metro Manila	
Location of the venues for the 2023 FIBA Basketball World Cup		Venues within Metro Manila	
Indonesia		Japan	
Jakarta		Okinawa City	
Istora Gelora Bung Karno; Capacity: 7,166 (renovated venue)		Okinawa Arena; Capacity: 10,000 (new venue)	

== Bid evaluation and review ==
=== Philippines ===
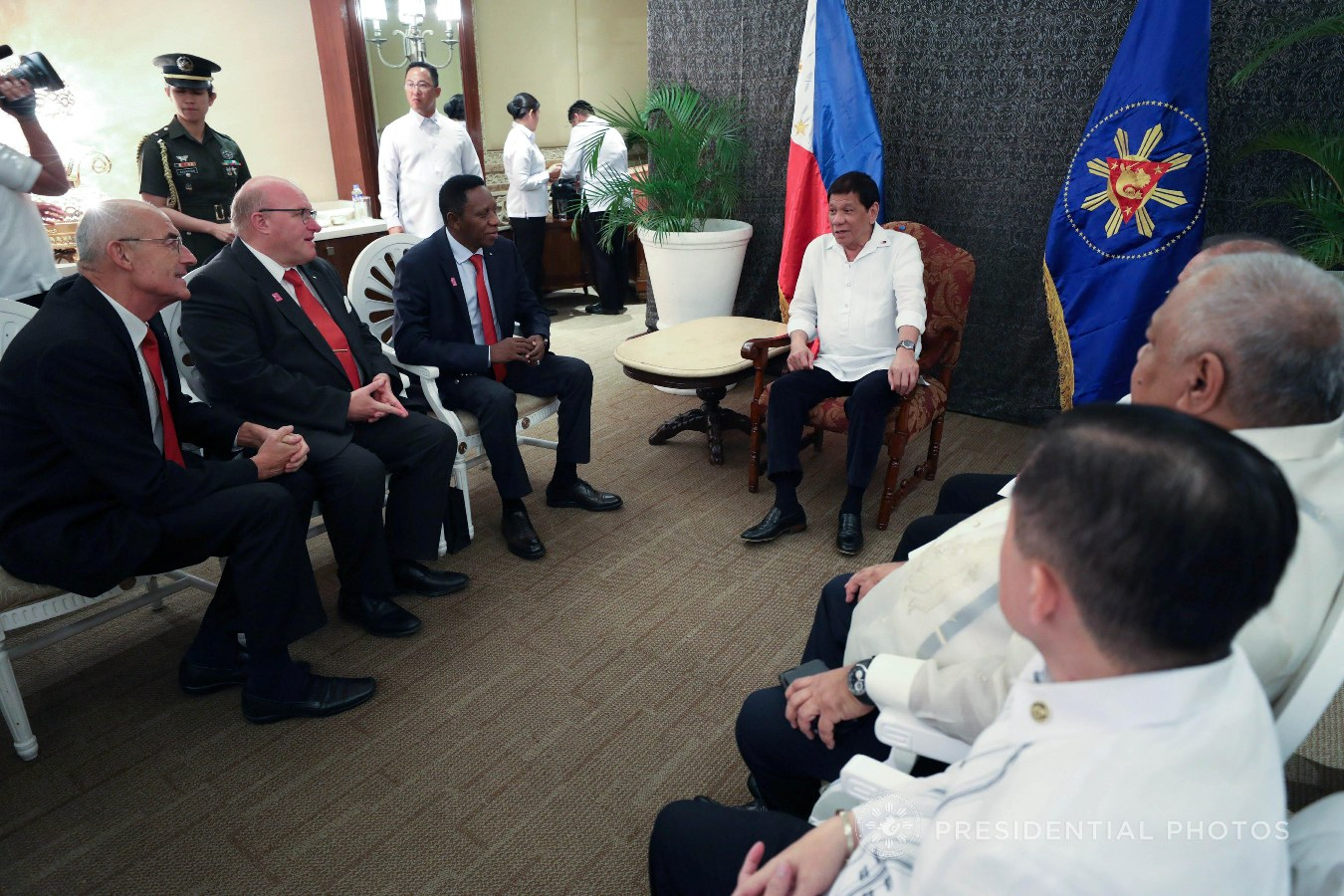
Philippine President Rodrigo Duterte meets with FIBA officials at the Manila Hotel.

From October 21-22, 2017, a three-man evaluation commission consisting of FIBA Central Board Members Hamane Niang of Mali and Ingo Weiss of Germany, and FIBA Senior Consultant Lubomir Kotleba of Slovakia came to the Philippines having already evaluated the Russian and Argentina-Uruguay bids. The Philippine government through Foreign Affairs Secretary Alan Peter Cayetano and President Rodrigo Duterte assured the commission of its support in a 19 October meeting at the Manila Hotel.

A bid presentation was held on October 21 at the Conrad Manila hotel in Pasay, Metro Manila. The bid which has the official slogan of "Play Louder Than Ever", was presented to the visiting FIBA commission.

Among those who spoke during the bid presentation are SBP Chairman emeritus Manny Pangilinan, SBP President Al Panlilio, and Foreign Affairs Secretary Cayetano. Consortium partners were also present during the bid presentation, with Japan Basketball Association Secretary-General Hirota Matsuhiro and Indonesian Basketball Association President Danny Kosasih, coming in with a staff of three.

=== Japan ===
When FIBA officials made evaluations in Okinawa, Japan, they were presented blueprints and animated sketches of Okinawa Arena, the proposed Japanese venue for the FIBA Basketball World Cup which was then in the planning stages. It is planned to be ready for the 2020 Summer Olympics.

== Bid presentation ==
The final bid presentation was made in Mies, Switzerland with the host countries of the 2023 FIBA Basketball World Cup announced on the same day. The joint Philippine-Japanese-Indonesian bid was favored by FIBA over Argentina and Uruguay's. However the two South American countries are given the chance to bid for the 2027 FIBA Basketball World Cup unopposed. They are to revise their bid according to FIBA's recommendations and represent their bid in June 2018. However Argentina and Uruguay decided to withdraw the bid for the 2027 edition.

== Aftermath ==
After winning the bid and hosting the tournament in 2023, the Philippines and Indonesia were awarded hosting rights for different international sporting events, including FIBA competitions.

On 20 March 2024, the Philippines was announced as the host of the 2025 FIVB Men's Volleyball World Championship. Subsequently, the hosting rights of the 2029 FIVB Women's Volleyball World Championship was awarded to the Philippines after the 2025 Men's World Championship. The country was also awarded the hosting rights of the 2025 FIFA Futsal Women's World Cup during a FIFA Council meeting on 15 May 2025 before the 74th FIFA Congress. On 3 July 2025, the Philippines was appointed as hosts of the 2027 FIBA Women's Asia Cup - the first FIBA-sanctioned continental event to be held in the country since the 2013 FIBA Asia Championship.

In May 2024, Indonesia won the right to host the 2025 World Artistic Gymnastics Championships, with Jakarta serving as host city. During a visit to the same city by FIBA representatives a year later, the organization announced that the country will host the 2028 FIBA Under-17 Women's Basketball World Cup and the 2029 FIBA Under-19 Basketball World Cup. It was also later announced on 3 July 2025 that Indonesia would host the 2027 FIBA Under-16 Women's Asia Cup and 2028 FIBA Under-18 Asia Cup.

== See also ==
- Philippine bid for the 2019 FIBA Basketball World Cup
