= 2022 Lipa local elections =

Philippine election

2022 Lipa mayoral election
- May 9, 2022
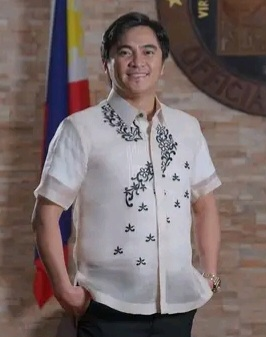
Nominee	Eric Africa	Meynardo Sabili	Nestor Sanares
Party	Nacionalista	PMP	PDR
Running mate	Mark Aries Luancing	Patmon Monfero	Camille Lopez
Popular vote	138,674	45,000	6,018
Percentage	73.10	23.73	3.17
Mayor before election
Eric Africa
Nacionalista
Elected mayor
Eric Africa
Nacionalista

Lipa City held its local elections on Monday, May 9, 2022, as a part of the 2022 Philippine general election. The voters will elect candidates for the elective local posts in the city: the mayor, vice mayor, the congressman (which will represent Batangas' sixth district which is composed of just the city), two provincial board members.

There are a total of 194,712 people who voted out of the 222,589 registered voters. Incumbent Mayor Eric Africa ran for re-election and won in the mayoralty race garnering 138,674 votes. Africa had 93,674 votes over his closest rival Meynardo Sabili. Camille Lopez defeated Incumbent Vice Mayor Mark Aries Luancing

== Background ==
=== Mayoral and Vice Mayoral elections ===
Incumbent Mayor Eric Africa is running for re-election to secure his second term as mayor. Africa initially won the mayorship in the 2019 elections by defeating former long-time mayor Meynardo Sabili. Prior to becoming mayor, Africa served as a city councilor from 1998 to 2007, returned to the council in 2010, and served as Vice Mayor from 2013 to 2019. Running under the Nacionalista party, Africa's platform focuses on expanding healthcare access, improving infrastructure, and enhancing public services to ensure sustainable development in the city.

In the vice mayoral race, Africa's running mate is Mark Luancing who is also running for his second term as the vice mayor.

The other candidate in the race was Nestor Sanares, who entered the mayoral elections with Camille Lopez as his running mate for vice mayor. Lopez ran against the incumbent Vice Mayor Mark Aries Luancing. Despite his efforts to secure another term, Luancing was defeated by Lopez.

Former Mayor Meynardo Sabili, who previously held office from 2010 to 2019, attempted to reclaim the mayoral seat under the Partido ng Masang Lipeno ticket. He was joined by his running mate, Patmon Monfero, who aimed to bring continuity to Sabili’s previous programs. Sabili campaigned on a platform of reviving his administration’s initiatives, focusing on economic growth and social welfare. However, despite their strong efforts, both Sabili and Monfero were defeated by the incumbents Africa and Lopez.

Key campaign issues for this election included addressing traffic congestion, improving the city's waste management system, and continuing economic recovery efforts after the challenges posed by the COVID-19 pandemic.

=== Congressional elections ===
Incumbent Congresswoman and Representative Vilma Santos-Recto opted not to seek re-election due to health concerns. Vilma Santos-Recto, who previously served as the city mayor and Batangas Governor before becoming the district’s representative, decided to focus on her recovery and personal well-being.

In her place, her husband, Ralph Recto, a seasoned politician with a long history in public service, ran for the congressional seat. Recto, who previously served as a Senator, campaigned on his extensive legislative experience and commitment to continuing the development programs initiated by his wife. His platform focused on economic recovery, healthcare, and infrastructure improvements for Lipa City, aiming to build on the Recto-Santos legacy in the region.

Ralph Recto’s candidacy drew considerable attention, as he sought to leverage his political experience to secure the congressional seat in place of his wife, a well-respected figure in Batangas politics. The election featured a competitive race among other candidates who aimed to introduce new leadership and direction for the 6th District of Batangas amidst ongoing concerns over economic growth and social services.
