= 2022 Philippine general election =

- May 9, 2022
- Registered: 67,523,697
- Turnout: 56,028,855 (82.98% ▲8.67pp from 2019)
- Presidential election
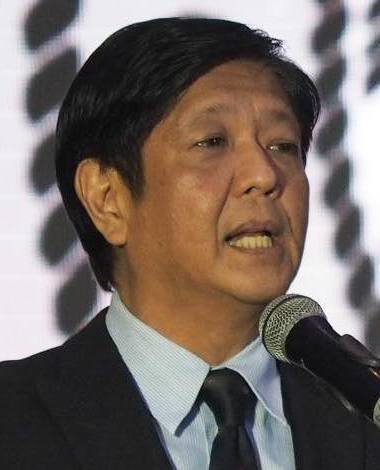

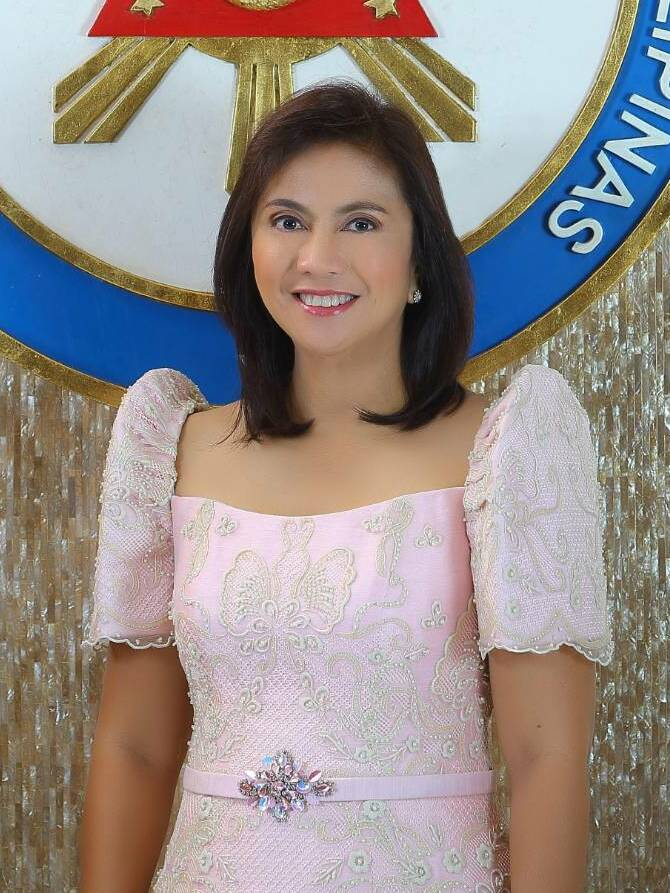

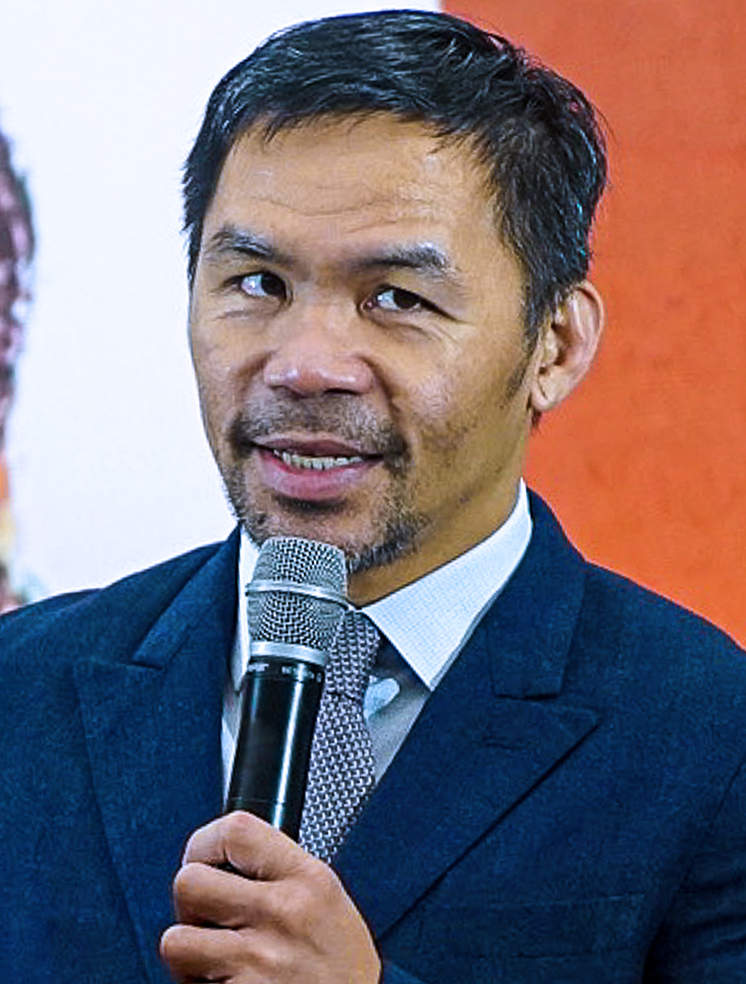
Candidate	Bongbong Marcos	Leni Robredo	Manny Pacquiao
Party	PFP	Independent (Note: Liberal Party member running as an independent)	PROMDI
Alliance	UniTeam	TRoPa	MP3
Running mate	Sara Duterte	Francis Pangilinan	Lito Atienza
Popular vote	31,629,783	15,035,773	3,663,113
Percentage	58.77%	27.94%	6.81%
President before election
Rodrigo Duterte
PDP–Laban
Elected President
Bongbong Marcos
PFP
- Vice presidential election
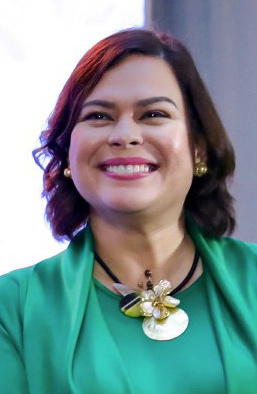

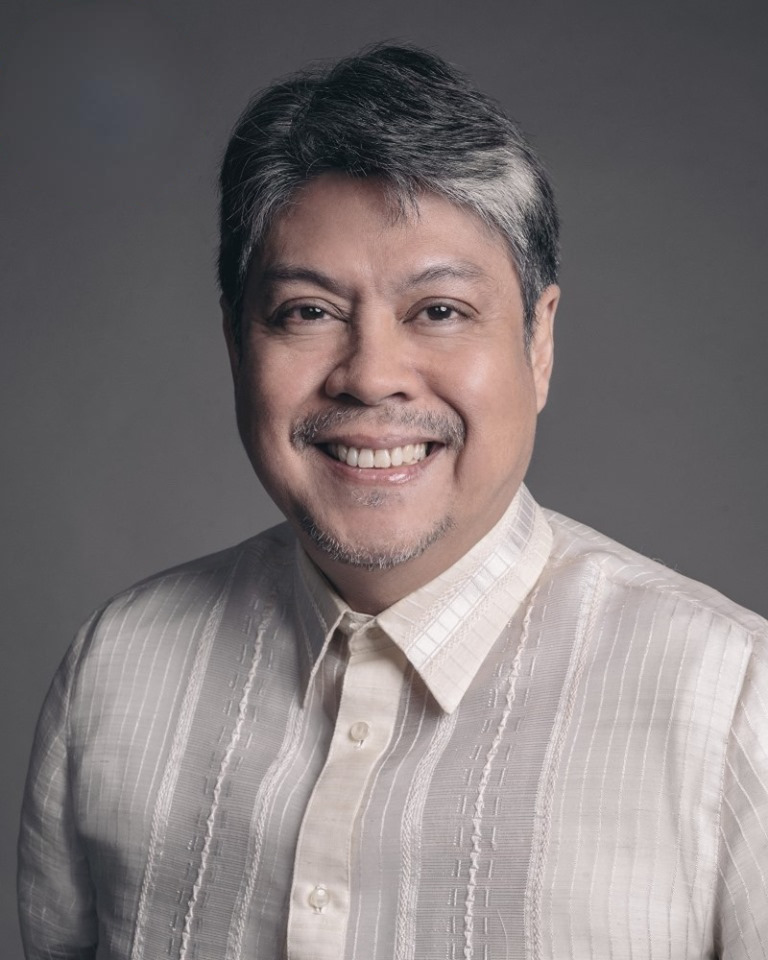

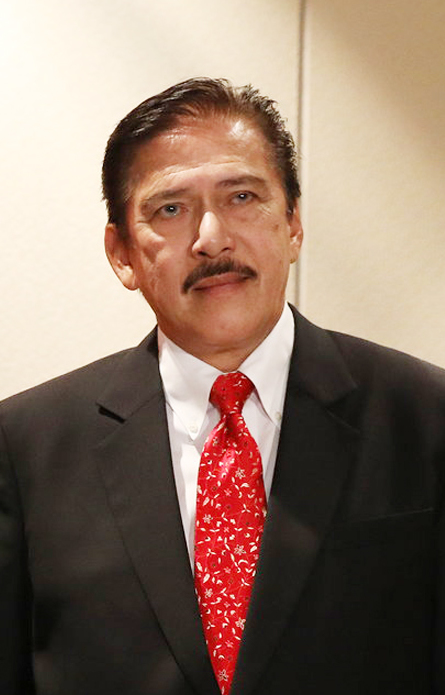
Candidate	Sara Duterte	Francis Pangilinan	Tito Sotto
Party	Lakas	Liberal	NPC
Alliance	UniTeam	TRoPa	Reporma–NPC
Popular vote	32,208,417	9,329,207	8,251,267
Percentage	61.53%	17.82%	15.67%
Vice President before election
Leni Robredo
Liberal
Elected Vice President
Sara Duterte
Lakas
- Senate election

12 of the 24 seats of the Senate of the Philippines 13 seats needed for a majority
Alliance	UniTeam	Reporma–NPC	TRoPa
Seats won	4+2 guests	3+1 guest	1+2 guests
Popular vote	120,752,210	82,579,024	53,753,651
Percentage	27.95%	19.12%	12.44%
- House of Representatives elections
- All 316 seats of the House of Representatives of the Philippines; 159 seats needed for a majority
Party	Vote %	Seats	+/–
PDP–Laban	22.77	66	−16
Nacionalista	13.75	36	−6
NUP	12.66	33	+8
NPC	11.72	35	−2
Lakas	9.22	26	+14
Liberal	3.79	10	−8
Others	26.09	47	+20
Party-list	—	63	+2
This lists parties that won seats. See the complete results below.
Speaker before	Speaker after
Lord Allan Velasco; PDP–Laban	Martin Romualdez; Lakas

The 2022 Philippine general election took place on May 9, 2022, for the executive and legislative branches of government at every level – national, provincial, and local – except for the barangay officials.

At the top of the ballot is the election for the successors to President Rodrigo Duterte and Vice President Leni Robredo. There were also elections for:

- 12 seats of the Senate
- All 316 seats of the House of Representatives
- All 81 governors and vice governors, and 782 seats of the provincial boards in all provinces
- All 146 city mayors and vice mayors, and 1,650 seats of the city councils in all cities
- All 1,488 municipal mayors and vice mayors, and 11,908 seats of the municipal councils in all municipalities

The first election of the Bangsamoro Parliament was scheduled to be held on the same date, but was rescheduled to 2025, then to 2026.

This is the first election in Davao de Oro under that name, as it was renamed from Compostela Valley in December 2019 after a successful plebiscite.

Logo for the 2022 NLE used for public materials and election awareness campaigns.

== Preparation ==
=== Commission on Elections membership ===
In September 2020, President Rodrigo Duterte appointed lawyer Michael Peloton as commissioner, filling in for the seat vacated by Luie Tito Guia's retirement. As this was a regular appointment as opposed to an ad interim one made when Congress is in recess, Peloton had to be confirmed by the Commission on Appointments before he could take office. In November, Duterte appointed Davao del Norte election supervisor Aimee Ferolino-Ampoloquio to the seat vacated by Al Parreño.

By October 2021, there were reports that Duterte would appoint Melvin Matibag, the secretary-general of the PDP–Laban faction preferred by the former, as chairman. Matibag denied he knew about talks of him being appointed as chairman. Several weeks later, Duterte appointed Rey Bulay, chief prosecutor of Manila, as commissioner, with a term ending in 2027, replacing Peloton, who was rejected by the Commission on Appointments. Bulay was accepted by the Commission on Appointments on December 1.

Chairman Sheriff Abas and commissioners Rowena Guanzon and Antonio Kho Jr. retired on February 2, 2022. Over a month later, acting presidential spokesperson Martin Andanar announced the appointments of Saidamen Balt Pangarungan as chairman, and George Erwin Garcia and Aimee Neri as commissioners. Garcia, who lists presidential candidate Bongbong Marcos as a previous client, promised to inhibit (i.e., recuse) himself from cases involving his former clients, including Marcos.

=== Voter registration ===
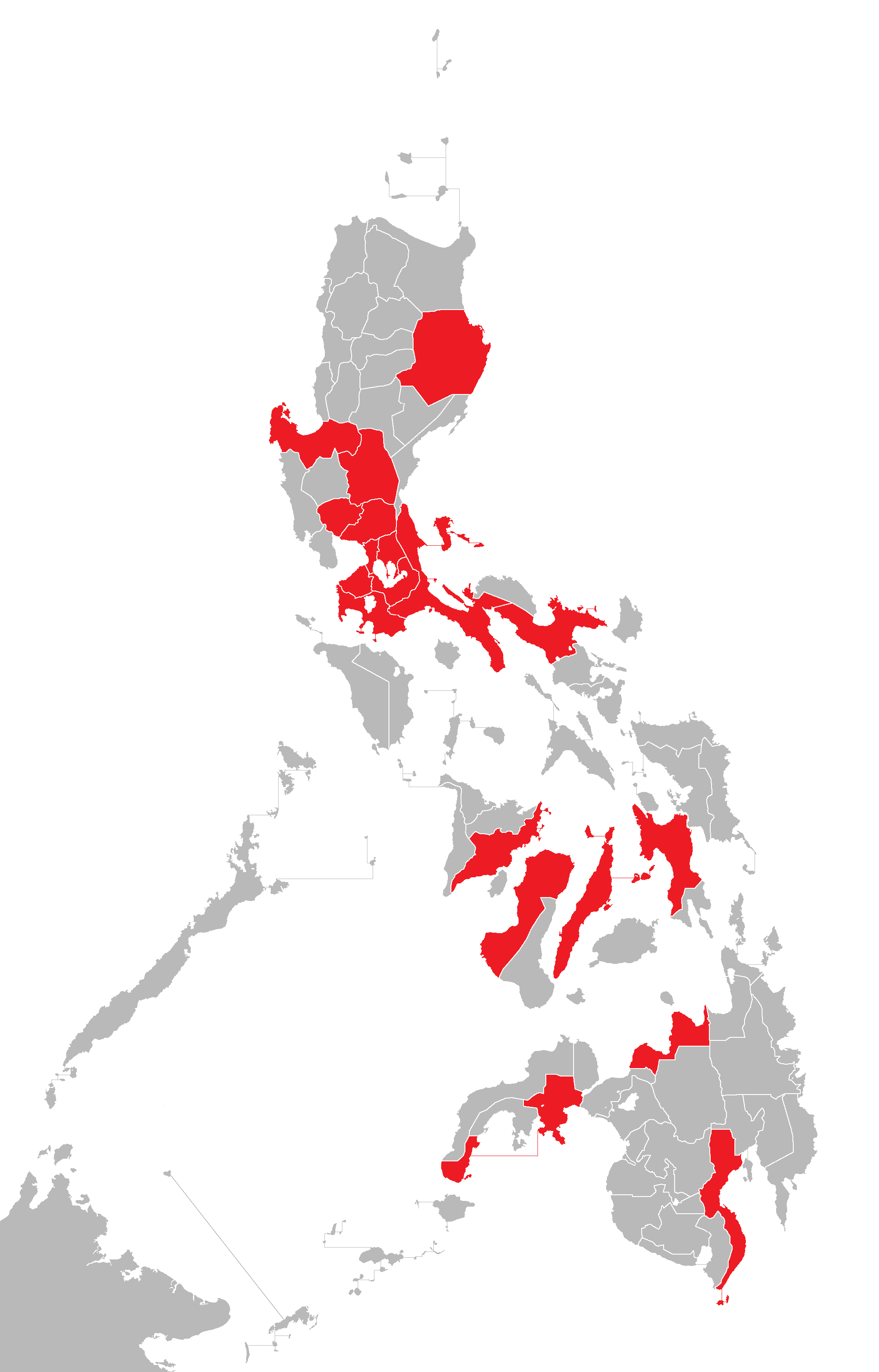
Vote-rich provinces, or provinces and Metro Manila as a whole that have more than one million voters. Nationally elected candidates and parties typically campaign in these areas to reduce costs.

Voter registration began on January 20, 2020, and was scheduled to end on September 30, 2021. The commission expects 4.3 million eligible voters to register. Registration was suspended in some areas in Cavite, Laguna and Batangas due to the Taal Volcano eruption, and in Makilala, Cotabato due to an earthquake. However, even before registration for 2022 opened, many voters enrolled early between August 1 and September 30, 2019, ahead of the barangay and Sangguniang Kabataan elections. These were initially scheduled for May 11, 2020, but were eventually postponed after the general election to December 5, 2022.

On March 10, 2020, the commission suspended voter registration in the entire country due to the COVID-19 pandemic in the Philippines. By June, the commission announced its initial resumption on July 1. However, the commission suspended voter registration anew up to August 31. The commission later stated on August 15 that voter registration would resume on September 1 in areas under general community quarantine (GCQ) or modified general community quarantine (MGCQ). Areas under enhanced community quarantine (ECQ) and modified enhanced community quarantine (MECQ) will have their registration suspended.

Registration in the province of Palawan was also suspended due to the plebiscite to divide it into three provinces on March 13, 2021. The plebiscite was originally set for May 11, 2020, but was rescheduled due to the pandemic.

In some areas, almost eight months of voter registration were lost due to lockdowns. There were calls to extend voter registration after September 30, 2021, but the commission rejected this, saying that this will delay other election-related activities. The commission instead allowed voter registration to continue in areas under MECQ starting on September 6, with longer hours and in malls.

With barely a week before the close of registration, the Senate passed a bill on second reading extending registration for another month. The House of Representatives passed a similar bill days later, also on second reading. Earlier, both chambers separately passed resolutions urging the commission to extend registration, while the Senate threatened to cut the commission's 2022 budget if registration was not extended. On the eve of the end of registration, Sheriff Abas announced that they approved extending registration from October 11 to 30 for voters in the Philippines, and from October 1 to 14 for overseas voters. On the same day, President Duterte signed into law extending registration for 30 days from when it was made effective.

After extended registration ended, the commission announced that 400,000 people registered in October. The commission tallied 65,745,529 voters in the Philippines, with Calabarzon being the region with the most voters, with 9.1 million. The total was almost 4 million more compared to 2019. By January 2022, the commission announced that they will print 67,442,714 ballots, with 1,697,202 of these for overseas absentee voting. The commission later released per-location total of registered voters, with Cebu (including independent cities associated with it) as the most vote-rich province, Quezon City as the most vote-rich city, and Calabarzon as the most vote-rich region.

In connection to the 2021 Southeast Asian Games which were held in Vietnam from May 12 to 23, 2022, the Philippine Sports Commission lobbied the commission to allow the participants to vote as local absentee voters. The commission denied the request, saying that unless a participant is a government official or employee, a member of either the Philippine National Police or Armed Forces of the Philippines who was assigned in places where one is not a voter, or media covering the games, the athlete cannot vote as a local absentee voter.

=== Election automation and logistics ===
Camarines Sur Representative Luis Raymund Villafuerte proposed to use a hybrid electoral system in 2022, or manual counting of votes, then electronic transmission of results. This is in contrast to the automated counting and transmission system used since 2010. He cited 40 lawsuits on the current system used by the Commission on Elections as evidence to shift away from automated counting of votes. President Rodrigo Duterte suggested junking Smartmatic as the automation partner for future elections because of problems from the previous election. However, Smartmatic expressed its interest to participate in future elections. In May 2021, the commission awarded the contract to conduct automated elections, specifically the software that will be used in the voting machines, to Smartmatic.

Administration of logistics related to the election was awarded to F2 Logistics in August 2021. A former commissioner questioned the deal because of the company's association with Dennis Uy, who donated to Duterte's 2016 presidential campaign. The commission stated that the deal with F2 Logistics is legal and valid.

=== Effects of the COVID-19 pandemic ===
In April 2020, COMELEC Commissioner Rowena Guanzon proposed voting by mail as an option in the elections, mainly due to the COVID-19 pandemic. By May 2021, Commissioner Antonio Kho Jr. said that voting hours would be extended, as the eight-hour timeframe given for previous elections could not be used any longer. As for multiple days of voting, Kho said that only a law passed by Congress would allow that to happen.

Senator Migz Zubiri, in a privileged speech, disclosed that he commissioned a Pulse Asia survey in July 2021 which said that 46% of voters will not vote if COVID-19 cases in their barangay are high on election day, with 35% willing to vote and 19% undecided. Zubiri questioned if the public would accept the results if less than a majority of voters turned out to vote.

==== Postponement of the elections due to COVID-19 ====
The 1987 Constitution of the Philippines states that unless otherwise provided by law, the election of members of Congress is held on the second Monday of May. According to Republic Act No. 7166, the election for national, provincial, city and municipal positions are held on the second Monday of May, since 1992, and every three years thereafter, with the president and vice president being elected in six-year intervals. It has been three years since the 2019 general election and six years since the 2016 presidential election, and with no law postponing the election to date, this meant that the election was scheduled to be held on May 9, 2022.

However, some congressmen and government officials suggested postponing the election due to the COVID-19 pandemic in the Philippines. Sherriff Abas, the chairman of the commission, said that it had not entered their minds, that the terms are fixed, adding that they are planning on having the vote over two days. Postponement is only possible if Congress passes a law permitting such, and if it is approved by the people in a plebiscite. The commission has no part in scheduling the election outside from what is mandated by the constitution.

A group called Coalition for Life and Democracy petitioned the commission to postpone the elections due to the ongoing pandemic. The group conceded that only Congress can postpone the election, and that their petition contained different dates to hold the election: the body of the petition called for it to be rescheduled to May 2023, but the prayer in it called for May 2025. Another petition that would affect the election's date was filed on December 31 by the Cusi wing of PDP–Laban. Their petition aimed to re-open the filing of candidacies, and to suspend the printing of ballots. The commission tackled both petitions, and announced that both were unanimously dismissed on January 12.

=== Postponement of the Bangsamoro Parliament election ===
In November 2020, the 80-person Bangsamoro Parliament passed a resolution urging Congress to extend the transition from June 2022 to 2025. If Congress agreed, no election would be held. By July 2021, Senator Migz Zubiri said that postponing the Bangsamoro election to 2025 is likely. In September, the Senate passed a bill postponing the election to 2025. A few days later, the House of Representatives passed their own version of the bill. As the two bills are different, they had to be reconciled before being sent to President Duterte for his signature. The conference committee approved the Senate version, giving the winner of the 2022 presidential election the power of appointing the next transitional parliament. Duterte then signed the bill into law, postponing the election to 2025.

== Electoral system ==
In the Philippines, congressional and local elections, excluding the regional and barangay levels, have been synchronized to be held on the second Monday of May every three years, starting in 1992. Presidents and vice presidents have six-year terms, so they are only elected on even-numbered years (1992, 1998, and so on). Elections where the presidency is not on the ballot are called midterm elections, and occur on odd-numbered years (1995, 2001, and so on).

Every seat up for election is voted on separately. Since 2010, general elections have been automated, with voters shading an oval next to their chosen candidate. For executive positions, elections are decided via the first-past-the-post voting (FPTP) system, where the voter has one choice. Elections to the Senate and local legislatures are held via multiple non-transferable vote, where the voter has x number of choices depending on the number of seats up for election (12 in the case of the Senate), and the x candidates with the highest number of votes win. For House elections, each voter has two votes, one via FPTP, and the other via a modified party-list proportional representation system.

Elections are organized, run, and adjudicated by the Commission on Elections (COMELEC), an independent governmental body. Appeals are allowed under certain conditions to the Regional Trial Courts, the Congress, or the Supreme Court, sitting as the House of Representatives Electoral Tribunal, the Senate Electoral Tribunal, or the Presidential Electoral Tribunal depending on the election being appealed.

== Calendar ==
The election calendar was published by COMELEC in February 2021:

=== Timetable ===
Activity	Start	End
Voter registration	January 20, 2020	March 9, 2020
Suspension of voter registration nationwide due to the COVID-19 pandemic	March 10, 2020	August 31, 2020
Holding of political conventions	September 1, 2021	September 28, 2021
Resumption of voter registration	September 1, 2020	September 30, 2021
Filing of certificates of candidacies	October 1, 2021	October 8, 2021
Extension of voter registration for overseas voters	October 1, 2021	October 14, 2021
Extension of voter registration for voters in the Philippines	October 11, 2021	October 30, 2021
Deadline in substituting a candidate for it to appear on the ballot	November 15, 2021	
Printing of ballots	January 20, 2022	April 2, 2022
Election period: Prohibition on carrying and usage of firearms; Prohibition on suspending from office of local elective officials	January 9, 2022	June 8, 2022
Campaign period for nationally elected positions	February 8, 2022	May 7, 2022
Campaign period for locally elected positions	March 25, 2022	May 7, 2022
Voting for overseas voters	April 10, 2022	May 9, 2022
Election silence (Maundy Thursday and Good Friday)	April 14, 2022	April 15, 2022
Voting for local absentee voters in the Philippines	April 27, 2022	April 29, 2022
Election silence	May 8, 2022	
Election day; voting for non-absentee voters in the Philippines	May 9, 2022	May 9, 2022
Counting of votes for city and municipal officials	May 9, 2022	May 12, 2022
Counting of votes for provincial officials and members of Congress	May 10, 2022	May 16, 2022
Term of office of winning candidates for local officials and House representatives	June 30, 2022	June 30, 2025
Term of office of winning candidates for president, vice president and senators	June 30, 2022	June 30, 2028

Ballot printing was initially scheduled to start on January 15, 2022. However, technical issues hounded the printing, and the commission postponed it to January 17, and then to January 19. The commission started printing ballots on January 20, 2022.

== Parties and coalitions ==
As this was a presidential election year, presidential candidates could endorse a running mate for vice president, a senatorial slate, district and party-list representatives, and local officials, who may not necessarily be of the same party or coalition. According to Joy Aceron, an academic from the Ateneo De Manila University, political parties in the Philippines have been described as "temporary political alliances", or it is argued that there are no parties at all, merely "fan clubs of politicians". Party-switching is not uncommon, and the dependence of parties on personalities instead of issues is seen as a factor of why this is so.

=== Parties and seats held prior to the elections ===
The following table is sorted by which party holds the presidency, vice presidency, number of House seats, and number of Senate seats.

Party		Abbr.	Leaders		Ideology	House seats	Senate seats	Endorsed presidential candidate
Party		Abbr.	Chairperson	President	Ideology	House seats	Senate seats	Endorsed presidential candidate
Partido Demokratiko Pilipino-Lakas ng Bayan; Philippine Democratic Party-People's Power	Cusi wing	PDP–Laban	President Rodrigo Duterte	Energy Secretary Alfonso Cusi	Social democracy Democratic socialism	62 / 304	5 / 24	Bongbong Marcos
Partido Demokratiko Pilipino-Lakas ng Bayan; Philippine Democratic Party-People's Power	Pimentel wing	PDP–Laban	Senator Koko Pimentel	Senator Manny Pacquiao	Social democracy Democratic socialism	62 / 304	5 / 24	Manny Pacquiao
Liberal Party; Liberal Party		LP	Vice President Leni Robredo	Senator Francis Pangilinan	Liberalism	16 / 304	3 / 24	Leni Robredo
Nacionalista Party; Nationalist Party		NP	Senator Cynthia Villar	Former Senate President Manny Villar	Conservatism	42 / 304	4 / 24	Bongbong Marcos
Nationalist People's Coalition		NPC	Senate President Tito Sotto	Former House Representative from Isabela Giorgidi Aggabao	Conservatism	33 / 304	3 / 24	None (Note: Some members of the party supported candidates other than Lacson. Therefore, the party has no official endorsed presidential candidate.)
National Unity Party		NUP	Former House Representative from Antipolo Ronaldo Puno	House Representative from Cavite Elpidio Barzaga Jr.	Social conservatism, Christian democracy	44 / 304	0 / 24	Bongbong Marcos
Lakas–Christian Muslim Democrats; People Power-Christian Muslim Democrats		Lakas–CMD	Davao City Mayor Sara Duterte	House Representative from Leyte Martin Romualdez	Christian democracy, Islamic democracy	19 / 304	1 / 24	Bongbong Marcos
Makabayang Koalisyon ng Mamamayan; Patriotic Coalition of the People		Makabayan or MKM	Former House Representative for Bayan Muna Neri Colmenares; Former Gabriela Women's Party House Representative Liza Maza; Former Agrarian Reform Secretary Rafael V. Mariano	Former House Representative for Bayan Muna Satur Ocampo	Progressivism, National Democracy	6 / 304	0 / 24	Leni Robredo
Laban ng Demokratikong Pilipino; Struggle of Democratic Filipinos		LDP	Senator Sonny Angara	House Representative from Aurora Bella Angara	Economic liberalism	2 / 304	1 / 24	None yet
Partido para sa Demokratikong Reporma; Party for Democratic Reforms		Reporma or PDR	Vacant	House Representative from Davao del Norte Pantaleon Alvarez	Conservative liberalism	1 / 304	1 / 24	Leni Robredo
Aksyon Demokratiko; Democratic Action		Aksyon	Ernesto Ramel Jr.	Manila Mayor Isko Moreno	Progressivism, liberal democracy	1 / 304	0 / 24	Isko Moreno
Akbayan Citizens Action Party		Akbayan	Gio Tiongson	Rafaela David	Progressivism, democratic socialism	0 / 304	1 / 24	Leni Robredo
Progressive Movement for the Devolution of Initiatives		PROMDI	Senator Manny Pacquiao (honorary chairperson)	Mimo Osmeña	Devolution	0 / 304	1 / 24	Manny Pacquiao
Partido Federal ng Pilipinas; Federal Party of the Philippines		PFP	Former Senator Bongbong Marcos	South Cotabato Governor Reynaldo Tamayo Jr.	Federalism	0 / 304	0 / 24	Bongbong Marcos

=== National conventions and assemblies ===
National political conventions and assemblies were held to nominate candidates for the upcoming election. The PDP–Laban's two factions held separate conventions. On September 8, 2021, the Cusi faction held their national convention in San Fernando, Pampanga, where they selected Senator Bong Go as their presidential nominee and incumbent President Rodrigo Duterte as his running mate. They also nominated eight people for senator. The opposing faction led by Pimentel held their convention in Quezon City on September 19. Senator Manny Pacquiao was nominated as their presidential candidate. On the same day, the Partido Federal ng Pilipinas (PFP) held their own convention, nominating former Senator Bongbong Marcos as their presidential candidate. He was also nominated by the Kilusang Bagong Lipunan (KBL) at their convention on September 24. National democracy coalition Makabayan held its assembly on September 27 and nominated members for its party lists. The Aksyon Demokratiko party also held their convention on September 27 in Manila, selecting Manila Mayor Isko Moreno and Willie Ong as their standard bearers for the presidential and vice presidential elections respectively. Aksyon also nominated two people for Senate. PROMDI held their national convention in Cebu City on the same day, nominating Pacquiao for president and approving an electoral alliance with the Pimentel faction of PDP–Laban. On September 28, two labor parties, Labor Party Philippines (LPP) and Partido Lakas ng Manggagawang Pilipino (PLMP), held their political convention in Mabalacat. This convention nominated Marcos for president, approved an electoral alliance between LPP and PLMP, endorsed the Asenso Manileño party list, and approved partnerships between LPP and KBL and PFP. The Partido Lakas ng Masa (PLM) held their national convention on the same day and nominated labor leader Leody de Guzman for president. Former Akbayan representative Walden Bello was eventually chosen to be his running mate.

Some of the results of the national conventions were noticeably not followed. For the Cusi faction of the PDP–Laban, Go declined to run for president, and Duterte, who originally accepted the nomination, changed his mind and announced his retirement from politics. In the end, Go became the vice presidential nominee, while Ronald dela Rosa was named their presidential nominee. Pacquiao ran under the PROMDI party instead of PDP–Laban, after the Pimentel faction forged an electoral alliance with them. Marcos, who was nominated by at least four parties, chose to run under the PFP. The Makabayan bloc would also later endorse incumbent VP Robredo and Senator Francis Pangilinan as their presidential and vice presidential candidates respectively.

In the flurry of substitutions prior to the deadline, Duterte and Go, erstwhile PDP–Laban politicians, were to run under the Pederalismo ng Dugong Dakilang Samahan as senator and president respectively, to avoid legal complications amidst the ongoing dispute in PDP–Laban. Go announced his withdrawal from the presidential election on November 30, 2021.

=== Coalitions ===
The Philippines is a multi-party democracy. This means parties enter into coalitions and alliances with each other prior to, during, and after elections in order to be part of the government. These coalitions are ordered by formalization date.

Coalition	Parties	Presidential ticket		Senatorial slate
Coalition	Parties	President	Vice president	Senatorial slate
MP3 Alliance; Formalized September 18, 2021	PDP–Laban Pimentel wing	Manny Pacquiao; PROMDI	Lito Atienza; PROMDI	Lutgardo Barbo (PDP–Laban); Jejomar Binay (UNA); Neri Colmenares (Makabayan); JV Ejercito (NPC); Chiz Escudero (NPC); Sherwin Gatchalian (NPC); Dick Gordon (Bagumbayan–VNP); Elmer Labog (Makabayan); Loren Legarda (NPC); Raffy Tulfo (Independent); Joel Villanueva (Independent); Migz Zubiri (Independent)
MP3 Alliance; Formalized September 18, 2021	PROMDI	Manny Pacquiao; PROMDI	Lito Atienza; PROMDI	Lutgardo Barbo (PDP–Laban); Jejomar Binay (UNA); Neri Colmenares (Makabayan); JV Ejercito (NPC); Chiz Escudero (NPC); Sherwin Gatchalian (NPC); Dick Gordon (Bagumbayan–VNP); Elmer Labog (Makabayan); Loren Legarda (NPC); Raffy Tulfo (Independent); Joel Villanueva (Independent); Migz Zubiri (Independent)
MP3 Alliance; Formalized September 18, 2021	People's Champ Movement	Manny Pacquiao; PROMDI	Lito Atienza; PROMDI	Lutgardo Barbo (PDP–Laban); Jejomar Binay (UNA); Neri Colmenares (Makabayan); JV Ejercito (NPC); Chiz Escudero (NPC); Sherwin Gatchalian (NPC); Dick Gordon (Bagumbayan–VNP); Elmer Labog (Makabayan); Loren Legarda (NPC); Raffy Tulfo (Independent); Joel Villanueva (Independent); Migz Zubiri (Independent)
Tuloy ang Pagbabago coalition Formalized September 23, 2021	PDP–Laban Cusi wing	none	Sara Duterte; Lakas–CMD	Greco Belgica (PDDS); John Castriciones (PDP–Laban); Gregorio Honasan (Independent); Rey Langit (PDP–Laban); Rodante Marcoleta (PDP–Laban); Robin Padilla (PDP–Laban); Salvador Panelo (PDP–Laban); Astravel Pimentel-Naik (PDP–Laban); Mark Villar (Nacionalista)
Tuloy ang Pagbabago coalition Formalized September 23, 2021	Pederalismo ng Dugong Dakilang Samahan (PDDS)	none	Sara Duterte; Lakas–CMD	Greco Belgica (PDDS); John Castriciones (PDP–Laban); Gregorio Honasan (Independent); Rey Langit (PDP–Laban); Rodante Marcoleta (PDP–Laban); Robin Padilla (PDP–Laban); Salvador Panelo (PDP–Laban); Astravel Pimentel-Naik (PDP–Laban); Mark Villar (Nacionalista)
UniTeam; Formalized November 25, 2021	Partido Federal ng Pilipinas (PFP)	Bongbong Marcos; PFP	Sara Duterte; Lakas–CMD	Herbert Bautista (NPC); Jinggoy Estrada (PMP); Larry Gadon (KBL); Sherwin Gatchalian (NPC); Gregorio Honasan (Independent); Loren Legarda (NPC); Rodante Marcoleta (PDP–Laban); Robin Padilla (PDP–Laban); Harry Roque (PRP); Gilbert Teodoro (PRP); Mark Villar (Nacionalista); Migz Zubiri (Independent)
UniTeam; Formalized November 25, 2021	Lakas–CMD	Bongbong Marcos; PFP	Sara Duterte; Lakas–CMD	Herbert Bautista (NPC); Jinggoy Estrada (PMP); Larry Gadon (KBL); Sherwin Gatchalian (NPC); Gregorio Honasan (Independent); Loren Legarda (NPC); Rodante Marcoleta (PDP–Laban); Robin Padilla (PDP–Laban); Harry Roque (PRP); Gilbert Teodoro (PRP); Mark Villar (Nacionalista); Migz Zubiri (Independent)
UniTeam; Formalized November 25, 2021	Pwersa ng Masang Pilipino (PMP)	Bongbong Marcos; PFP	Sara Duterte; Lakas–CMD	Herbert Bautista (NPC); Jinggoy Estrada (PMP); Larry Gadon (KBL); Sherwin Gatchalian (NPC); Gregorio Honasan (Independent); Loren Legarda (NPC); Rodante Marcoleta (PDP–Laban); Robin Padilla (PDP–Laban); Harry Roque (PRP); Gilbert Teodoro (PRP); Mark Villar (Nacionalista); Migz Zubiri (Independent)
UniTeam; Formalized November 25, 2021	Hugpong ng Pagbabago (HNP)	Bongbong Marcos; PFP	Sara Duterte; Lakas–CMD	Herbert Bautista (NPC); Jinggoy Estrada (PMP); Larry Gadon (KBL); Sherwin Gatchalian (NPC); Gregorio Honasan (Independent); Loren Legarda (NPC); Rodante Marcoleta (PDP–Laban); Robin Padilla (PDP–Laban); Harry Roque (PRP); Gilbert Teodoro (PRP); Mark Villar (Nacionalista); Migz Zubiri (Independent)
Team Robredo–Pangilinan	Liberal Party (LP)	Leni Robredo; Independent	Francis Pangilinan; Liberal	Teddy Baguilat (Liberal); Jejomar Binay (UNA); Leila de Lima (Liberal); Chel Diokno (KANP); Francis Escudero (NPC); Dick Gordon (Bagumbayan–VNP); Risa Hontiveros (Akbayan); Alex Lacson (Ang Kapatiran); Sonny Matula (Independent); Antonio Trillanes (Liberal); Joel Villanueva (Independent)
Team Robredo–Pangilinan	Akbayan	Leni Robredo; Independent	Francis Pangilinan; Liberal	Teddy Baguilat (Liberal); Jejomar Binay (UNA); Leila de Lima (Liberal); Chel Diokno (KANP); Francis Escudero (NPC); Dick Gordon (Bagumbayan–VNP); Risa Hontiveros (Akbayan); Alex Lacson (Ang Kapatiran); Sonny Matula (Independent); Antonio Trillanes (Liberal); Joel Villanueva (Independent)
Team Robredo–Pangilinan	Katipunan ng Nagkakaisang Pilipino (KANP)	Leni Robredo; Independent	Francis Pangilinan; Liberal	Teddy Baguilat (Liberal); Jejomar Binay (UNA); Leila de Lima (Liberal); Chel Diokno (KANP); Francis Escudero (NPC); Dick Gordon (Bagumbayan–VNP); Risa Hontiveros (Akbayan); Alex Lacson (Ang Kapatiran); Sonny Matula (Independent); Antonio Trillanes (Liberal); Joel Villanueva (Independent)
Team Robredo–Pangilinan	Ang Kapatiran	Leni Robredo; Independent	Francis Pangilinan; Liberal	Teddy Baguilat (Liberal); Jejomar Binay (UNA); Leila de Lima (Liberal); Chel Diokno (KANP); Francis Escudero (NPC); Dick Gordon (Bagumbayan–VNP); Risa Hontiveros (Akbayan); Alex Lacson (Ang Kapatiran); Sonny Matula (Independent); Antonio Trillanes (Liberal); Joel Villanueva (Independent)
Laban ng Masa	Partido Lakas ng Masa (PLM)	Leody de Guzman; PLM	Walden Bello; PLM	Teddy Baguilat (Liberal); Roy Cabonegro (PLM); Neri Colmenares (Makabayan); David D'Angelo (PLM); Leila de Lima (Liberal); Chel Diokno (KANP); Luke Espíritu (BMP); Risa Hontiveros (Akbayan); Elmer Labog (Makabayan); Sonny Matula (Independent)
Laban ng Masa	Sanlakas	Leody de Guzman; PLM	Walden Bello; PLM	Teddy Baguilat (Liberal); Roy Cabonegro (PLM); Neri Colmenares (Makabayan); David D'Angelo (PLM); Leila de Lima (Liberal); Chel Diokno (KANP); Luke Espíritu (BMP); Risa Hontiveros (Akbayan); Elmer Labog (Makabayan); Sonny Matula (Independent)

== Issues ==
=== Relationship with China ===
Laura del Rosario, former Undersecretary for International Economic Affairs, alleged that to ensure a pro-Chinese leader is elected, multiple candidates would be clandestinely supported by China, and encouraged the public to reject these "Manchurian candidates". China was involved in territorial disputes with the Philippines throughout the election period. Rodrigo Duterte's office described former Secretary of Foreign Affairs Albert del Rosario's allegation that he received support from China in 2016 as nonsensical.

=== Candidate substitution ===
Substitution of candidates aside from death or illness is allowed in the Philippines, under the Omnibus Election Code. A substitute can replace a withdrawn candidate only on COMELEC's set schedule; for death or disqualification, the substitute can replace the original candidate until midday on election day. Notably, incumbent president Rodrigo Duterte was a substitute in 2016. Deputy speaker Rufus Rodriguez proposed to ban such substitutions, and to reimpose the old rule that requires candidates to resign from any political positions they hold when running for a different position. The commission promised to be firm on rules regarding substitution after Sara Duterte missed the deadline to file for presidential candidacy.

=== Smartmatic data breach ===
On January 10, 2022, the Manila Bulletin published an article alleging that COMELEC's servers were hacked by a group who downloaded more than 60 gigabytes of data containing usernames and passwords for the vote-counting machines (VCMs), and other sensitive information. The commission initially denied its servers were breached and asserted that their system has not yet been connected to any network and no PINs have been generated. Following the report, the National Bureau of Investigation (NBI) launched its own investigation into the incident. Another investigation by the Department of Information and Communications Technology (DICT) asserted that it was not COMELEC that was hacked, but its software contractor, Smartmatic. A public hearing was held by the Senate. On March 17, 2022 after the Senate's executive session with COMELEC officials, senators Imee Marcos and Tito Sotto revealed that Smartmatic was breached after an employee allowed a group to copy data from a company-issued laptop. The commission later met with Smartmatic officials on March 31. On April 1, COMELEC confirmed the Smartmatic breach, but clarified that the leaked data was not related to the elections, and the SD cards for the VCMs were not compromised.

=== Election-related violence ===
Even before election day, multiple cases of gun violence and attacks were reported in different areas of the country. In Ilocos Sur, a shoot-out led to 2 injuries.

COMELEC placed the following areas under strict control. Once an area is placed under the commission's control, it has direct supervision over officials and employees, and full control over law enforcement agencies guarding the area. Prior to the release of the initial two places, the commission withheld releasing a list of such areas because it had not yet been validated. Most of the places under commission control are located in Mindanao.

- Malabang, in Lanao del Sur, due to a "recent spate of killings"
- Tubaran, Lanao del Sur, which has a history of election-related violence
- The following places in Bangsamoro, upon recommendation of the police, military, and regional election director:
  - Marawi, Lanao del Sur
  - Maguing, Lanao del Sur
  - Buluan, Maguindanao
  - Datu Odin Sinsuat, Maguindanao
  - Datu Piang, Maguindanao
  - Mangudadatu, Maguindanao
  - Pandag, Maguindanao
  - Sultan Kudarat, Maguindanao
- Misamis Occidental, for security and safety concerns
- Pilar, in Abra, upon petition of its mayor

On the election day itself, several separate incidents of grenade explosions were reported in the Maguindanaon towns of Datu Unsay and Shariff Aguak, which resulted in nine minor injuries. In Buluan in the same province, a shooting led to the deaths of three guards. In Datu Piang, six were hurt when a grenade exploded in front of a polling center.

One day after the elections, escalating protests at the Butig town hall in Lanao del Sur resulted in multiple injuries and damage to the hall's windows. The AFP calmed down the situation after sending additional personnel to the area. Accusations of electoral cheating by bringing VCMs into the hall as well as allegations of ballot fraud were seen as the primary reasons for the conflict between the two camps in the mayoral race.

=== Issues with vote-counting machines ===
Out of the 106,174 VCMs used in the elections, about 1,800 malfunctioned in election day. Commissioner George Garcia listed the common issues that the VCMs encountered as follows:

- 940 VCMs had a paper jam
- 606 VCMs rejected ballots
- 158 VCMs had scanner issues
- 87 VCMs were not printing
- 76 VCMs were not printing properly

The affected VCMs were repaired by technicians and only ten faulty machines needed to be replaced.

Voters in several precincts complained about the ordeal and many of them exceeded the allotted voting time during election day due to delays and machine malfunctions. Many were told to leave their ballots for the precinct director to scan, with some required to sign a waiver. This resulted in dismay from voters with many rejecting the offer. Some ballots which were successfully entered into the VCMs were reportedly not counted after the machine broke down requiring a designated technician to repair or replace it. COMELEC then ordered a temporary time extension for the precincts encountering problems.

According to national security adviser Hermogenes Esperon Jr., there were more than 20,000 attempts to hack the VCM system and automated fraud attempts but all were prevented. Esperon also noted that the number of malfunctioning VCMs did not reach one percent of the total number of VCMs that were used during the elections, signifying that the system was effective.

=== Red-tagging and harassment of candidates ===
Red-tagging has been used as a "weapon" against opposition candidates during election campaigns, according to media watchdogs and members of the political opposition. Red-tagging has also been used to divert public attention from economic hardships and extrajudicial killings attributed to incumbent candidates.

During the 2022 Philippine presidential election, the red-tagging of presidential candidate Leni Robredo by incumbent officials were frequently featured on the Manila Times and the Daily Tribune, according to media observers. A report by the ASEAN Parliamentarians for Human Rights said that Robredo was the "prime target of intensified disinformation and red-tagging in social media leading up to election day." The report also said that candidates and elected representatives of the Makabayan bloc were also red-tagged. Former Congress representative and senatorial candidate Neri Colmenares said that red-tagging increased during elections and targeted opposition candidates who protested the Philippine government's poor COVID pandemic response, the Anti-Terrorism Law, and the extrajudicial killing of activists. Colmenares said that candidates of the Otso Diretso senatorial slate were also red-tagged during the 2019 election campaign, and that the red-tagging died down after the election.

In February 2025, the Philippine Commission on Elections (COMELEC) issued Resolution No. 11116, which made red-tagging and discrimination during election campaigns offenses punishable with imprisonment of one to six years and disqualification from public office. COMELEC Chair George Erwin Garcia said that the policy is based on the Supreme Court ruling that defined red-tagging as an act that threatens individuals.

In March 2025, during the campaign for the 2025 Philippine general election, Bayan Muna party-list nominee Neri Colmenares filed a complaint urging COMELEC to investigate allegations of red-tagging and vilification constituting "massive and widespread black propaganda" and the destruction of campaign materials. Vote Report PH noted reports of red-tagging, harassment, and disinformation prior to the elections, alongside vote buying and abuse of government resources in campaigns.

The International Coalition for Human Rights in the Philippines stated that red-tagging was the most common election violation as of April 30, 2025, making up 78.7% of the election violations it had recorded. "This level of systematic red-tagging is not only a violation of human rights, it's a coordinated effort to intimidate and discredit democratic actors," the group said.

=== Observations ===
The International Coalition for Human Rights in the Philippines (ICHRP), a global human rights group, released its final report in June 2022. The report said the elections failed to meet the standards of "free, honest, and fair" voting, citing reports of human rights violations and fraud. The ICHRP recommended the restructuring of COMELEC and replacing VCMs for future elections.

== Campaign ==
Campaigning for nationally elected positions began on February 8, 2022. COMELEC, due to the ongoing COVID-19 pandemic, prohibited entering houses, kissing and hugging, and taking selfies with voters. Campaigns also required approval from the local elections office before being allowed to start. The commission also set up a Facebook page for its e-rallies, allowing candidates and parties a limited time to campaign. With most of the country being placed in Alert Level 1, the commission recalibrated its rules on March 16, increasing the capacity for venues and removing the need for permits for localities in levels 1 and 2.

The commission, as mandated by the Fair Elections Act, also banned campaign paraphernalia outside the common posting areas in every locality, in public spaces, and in private property without the owner's consent.

=== Oplan Baklas ===
The Philippine National Police started Oplan Baklas (lit. 'operation plan remove') on the first day of campaigning. The Leni Robredo presidential campaign, citing the arbitrary application of the law, was considering legal action in response to the actions of the authorities, as they removed campaign materials from private property. This followed the removal of campaign materials from their media center in Quezon City, and from their Santiago, Isabela campaign headquarters. Interior Secretary Eduardo Año defended the police actions, saying that private property owners were notified of the violations before the campaign materials were removed. 1Sambayan cited the Diocese of Bacolod v. COMELEC Supreme Court case, which states "COMELEC [has] no legal basis to regulate expressions made by private citizens." On March 8, the Supreme Court issued a restraining order against the operation.

One day after the elections, the MMDA and several LGUs conducted widespread enforcement, removing campaign posters and electoral paraphernalia. Posters near schools and government buildings were prioritized for clearance ahead of incoming classes. A week after the election, the MMDA had removed more than 470 tons of campaign material.

In March 2024, almost two years after the election, the Supreme Court ruled Oplan Baklas, as it pertains to removal of campaign materials in private property, as unconstitutional, citing the aforementioned Diocese of Bacolod v. COMELEC case as precedent.

== Candidates ==
These are the candidates for national-level positions, except for party list candidates:

=== For president ===
#	Name	Party
1	Ernesto Abella	Independent
2	Leody de Guzman	PLM
3	Isko Moreno	Aksyon
4	Norberto Gonzales	PDSP
5	Panfilo Lacson	Independent (Note: Originally ran under Partido para sa Demokratikong Reporma; resigned from the party mid-way through the campaign. Still labeled as a Reporma candidate on official ballots.)
6	Faisal Mangondato	Katipunan
7	Bongbong Marcos	PFP
8	Jose Montemayor Jr.	DPP
9	Manny Pacquiao	PROMDI
10	Leni Robredo	Independent (Note: Liberal Party member running as an independent)

=== For vice president ===
#	Name	Party
1	Lito Atienza	PROMDI
2	Walden Bello	PLM
3	Rizalito David	DPP
4	Sara Duterte	Lakas
5	Manny SD Lopez	WPP
6	Willie Ong	Aksyon
7	Francis Pangilinan	Liberal
8	Carlos Serapio	Katipunan
9	Tito Sotto	NPC

=== For senator ===
#	Name	Party
1	Abner Afuang	Independent
2	Ibrahim Albani	WPP
3	Jess Arranza	Independent
4	Teddy Baguilat	Liberal
5	Agnes Bailen	Independent
6	Carl Balita	Aksyon
7	Lutgardo Barbo	PDP–Laban
8	Herbert Bautista	NPC
9	Greco Belgica	PDDS
10	Silvestro Bello Jr.	PDP–Laban
11	Jejomar Binay	UNA
12	Roy Cabonegro	PLM
13	John Castriciones	PDP–Laban
14	Alan Peter Cayetano	Independent
15	Melchor Chavez	WPP
16	Neri Colmenares	Makabayan
17	David D'Angelo	PLM
18	Leila de Lima	Liberal
19	Monsour del Rosario	Reporma
20	Ding Diaz	PPP
21	Chel Diokno	KANP
22	JV Ejercito	NPC
23	Guillermo Eleazar	Reporma
24	Ernie Ereño	PM
25	Francis Escudero	NPC
26	Luke Espiritu	PLM
27	Jinggoy Estrada	PMP
28	Baldomero Falcone	DPP
29	Larry Gadon	KBL
30	Sherwin Gatchalian	NPC
31	Richard Gordon	Bagumbayan
32	Samira Gutoc	Aksyon

#	Name	Party
33	Gringo Honasan	Independent
34	Risa Hontiveros	Akbayan
35	RJ Javellana	Independent
36	Nur-Mahal Kiram	Independent
37	Elmer Labog	Makabayan
38	Alex Lacson	Ang Kapatiran
39	Rey Langit	PDP–Laban
40	Loren Legarda	NPC
41	Ariel Lim	Independent
42	Emily Mallillin	PPM
43	Rodante Marcoleta (Note: Withdrew; name remained on ballot)	PDP–Laban
44	Francis Leo Marcos	Independent
45	Sonny Matula	Independent
46	Marieta Mindalano-Adam	Katipunan
47	Leo Olarte	Bigkis
48	Minguita Padilla	Reporma
49	Robin Padilla	PDP–Laban
50	Salvador Panelo	PDP–Laban
51	Astra Pimentel	PDP–Laban
52	Manny Piñol	NPC
53	Willie Ricablanca Jr.	PM
54	Harry Roque	PRP
55	Nur-Ana Sahidulla	PDDS
56	Jopet Sison	Aksyon
57	Gilberto Teodoro	PRP
58	Antonio Trillanes	Liberal
59	Raffy Tulfo	Independent
60	Rey Valeros	Independent
61	Joel Villanueva	Independent
62	Mark Villar	Nacionalista
63	Carmen Zubiaga	Independent
64	Migz Zubiri	Independent

== Results ==
COMELEC announced that there would be 18,180 posts up for election, including the 80 seats that would have been contested in the Bangsamoro Parliament. The commission then announced that there will be 18,100 posts up, with a total of 47,853 candidates running across all posts.

Overseas absentee voting began on April 10 and ended on May 9, election day in the Philippines. There were about 1.6 million registered voters outside the country.

The commission declared the winners for all positions except for president and vice president, who were declared by Congress.

=== For president ===
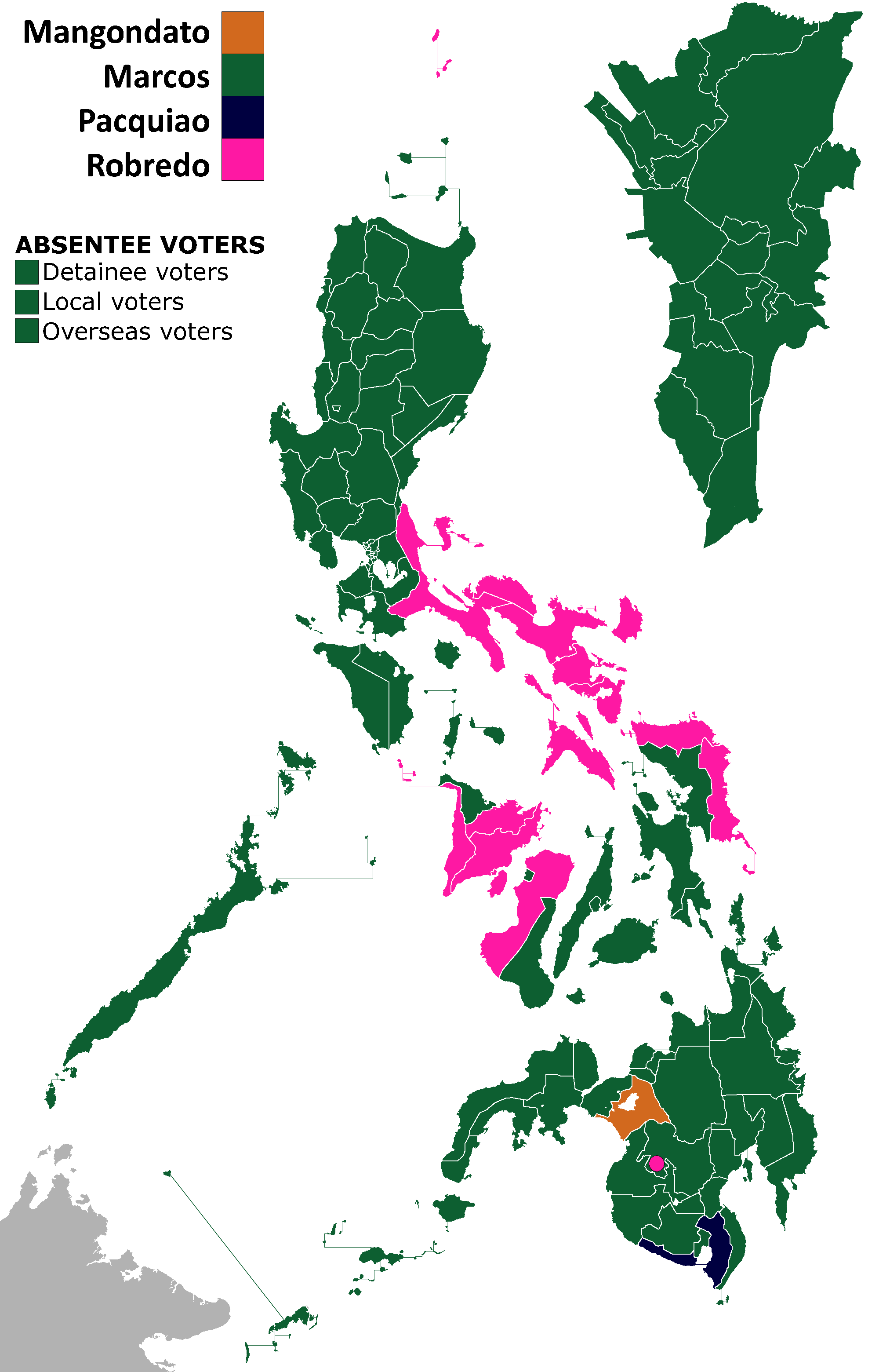
Map showing which presidential candidate won each province and select cities

The presidential election determined the successor of Rodrigo Duterte, who was term-limited and thus could not run for re-election. COMELEC released the official list of candidates on January 18, 2022, with 10 candidates listed on the final ballot.

Bongbong Marcos was elected with over 31 million votes.

Candidate	Party	Votes	%
Bongbong Marcos	Partido Federal ng Pilipinas	31,629,783	58.77
Leni Robredo	Independent (Note: Liberal Party member running as an independent)	15,035,773	27.94
Manny Pacquiao	PROMDI	3,663,113	6.81
Isko Moreno	Aksyon Demokratiko	1,933,909	3.59
Panfilo Lacson	Independent (Note: Originally ran under Partido para sa Demokratikong Reporma; resigned from the party mid-way through the campaign. Still labeled as a Reporma candidate on the official ballots.)	892,375	1.66
Faisal Mangondato	Katipunan ng Kamalayang Kayumanggi	301,629	0.56
Ernesto Abella	Independent	114,627	0.21
Leody de Guzman	Partido Lakas ng Masa	93,027	0.17
Norberto Gonzales	Partido Demokratiko Sosyalista ng Pilipinas	90,656	0.17
Jose Montemayor Jr.	Democratic Party of the Philippines	60,592	0.11
Total		53,815,484	100.00
Valid votes		53,815,484	96.05
Invalid/blank votes		2,213,371	3.95
Total votes		56,028,855	100.00
Registered voters/turnout		67,523,697	82.98
Source: Congress (vote totals); COMELEC (election day turnout, absentee turnout)

=== For vice president ===
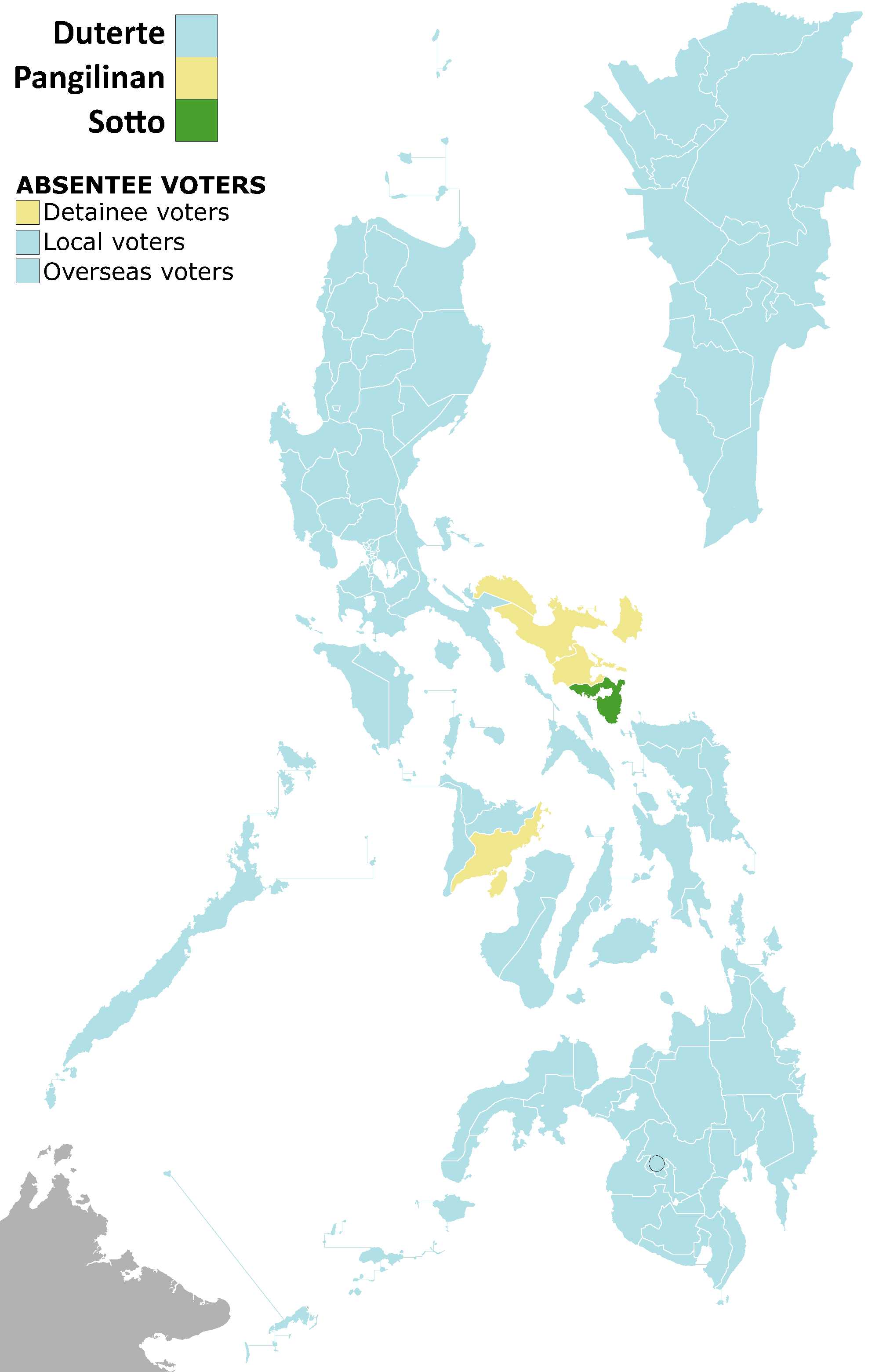
Map showing which vice presidential candidate won each province and select cities

The vice presidential election determined the successor of Leni Robredo, who was eligible for a second term but decided to run for president. COMELEC released the official list of candidates on January 18, 2022. There were nine candidates on the ballot.

Sara Duterte, daughter of outgoing president Rodrigo Duterte, was elected with over 32 million votes.

Candidate	Party	Votes	%
Sara Duterte (Note: Running mate of Bongbong Marcos (Partido Federal ng Pilipinas))	Lakas–CMD	32,208,417	61.53
Kiko Pangilinan (Note: Running mate of Leni Robredo (Independent))	Liberal Party	9,329,207	17.82
Tito Sotto (Note: Running mate of Panfilo Lacson (Independent))	Nationalist People's Coalition	8,251,267	15.76
Willie Ong	Aksyon Demokratiko	1,878,531	3.59
Lito Atienza	PROMDI	270,381	0.52
Manny SD Lopez	Labor Party Philippines	159,670	0.31
Walden Bello	Partido Lakas ng Masa	100,827	0.19
Carlos Serapio	Katipunan ng Kamalayang Kayumanggi	90,989	0.17
Rizalito David	Democratic Party of the Philippines	56,711	0.11
Total		52,346,000	100.00
Valid votes		52,346,000	93.43
Invalid/blank votes		3,682,855	6.57
Total votes		56,028,855	100.00
Registered voters/turnout		67,523,697	82.98
Source: Congress (vote totals); COMELEC (election day turnout, absentee turnout)

=== Congress ===
Members of the 19th Congress of the Philippines were elected in this election.

==== Senate ====
One half of the senators, or 12 of 24 seats in the Senate, last contested in 2016, were up for election. Those elected in 2019 were joined by the winners of this election to serve in the 19th Congress. There were 178 people who filed to run for Senate, and the final ballot included 64 names.

Among the senators-elect, four were reelected, five returned to the Senate, and three including top vote-winner Robin Padilla were new. Migz Zubiri was elected Senate President.

Candidate	Party or alliance		Votes	%
Robin Padilla	Tuloy ang Pagbabago (Note: Guest candidate of the UniTeam)	PDP–Laban	26,612,434	47.91
Loren Legarda	Lacson–Sotto slate (Note: Guest candidate of the MP3 Alliance) (Note: Guest candidate of Tuloy ang Pagbabago)	Nationalist People's Coalition	24,264,969	43.68
Raffy Tulfo	Independent (Note: Guest candidate of the Lacson–Sotto slate)		23,396,954	42.12
Sherwin Gatchalian	UniTeam	Nationalist People's Coalition	20,602,655	37.09
Francis Escudero	Lacson–Sotto slate (Note: Guest candidate of Team Robredo–Pangilinan)	Nationalist People's Coalition	20,271,458	36.49
Mark Villar	UniTeam	Nacionalista Party	19,475,592	35.06
Alan Peter Cayetano	Independent		19,295,314	34.74
Juan Miguel Zubiri	UniTeam	Independent	18,734,336	33.73
Joel Villanueva	Independent		18,486,034	33.28
JV Ejercito	Lacson–Sotto slate (Note: Guest candidate of Aksyon Demokratiko)	Nationalist People's Coalition	15,841,858	28.52
Risa Hontiveros	Team Robredo–Pangilinan (Note: Guest candidate of Laban ng Masa)	Akbayan	15,420,807	27.76
Jinggoy Estrada	UniTeam	Pwersa ng Masang Pilipino	15,108,625	27.20
Jejomar Binay	United Nationalist Alliance		13,263,970	23.88
Herbert Bautista	UniTeam	Nationalist People's Coalition	13,104,710	23.59
Gilbert Teodoro	UniTeam	People's Reform Party	12,788,479	23.02
Guillermo Eleazar	Lacson–Sotto slate	Partido para sa Demokratikong Reporma	11,305,322	20.35
Harry Roque	UniTeam	People's Reform Party	11,246,206	20.25
Gregorio Honasan	Independent		10,643,491	19.16
Chel Diokno	Team Robredo–Pangilinan	Katipunan ng Nagkakaisang Pilipino	9,978,444	17.96
Larry Gadon	UniTeam	Kilusang Bagong Lipunan	9,691,607	17.45
Antonio Trillanes	Team Robredo–Pangilinan	Liberal Party	8,630,272	15.54
Dick Gordon	Bagumbayan–VNP		8,377,893	15.08
Leila de Lima	Team Robredo–Pangilinan	Liberal Party	7,278,602	13.10
Neri Colmenares	Makabayan		6,098,782	10.98
Alex Lacson	Team Robredo–Pangilinan	Ang Kapatiran	5,477,088	9.86
Salvador Panelo	Tuloy ang Pagbabago	PDP–Laban	4,887,066	8.80
Francis Leo Marcos	Independent		4,538,857	8.17
Teddy Baguilat	Team Robredo–Pangilinan	Liberal Party	4,275,873	7.70
Monsour del Rosario	Lacson–Sotto slate	Partido para sa Demokratikong Reporma	3,810,096	6.86
Carl Balita	Aksyon Demokratiko		3,730,164	6.71
Rodante Marcoleta (Note: Withdrew but remained on the ballot)	Tuloy ang Pagbabago	PDP–Laban	3,591,899	6.47
Emmanuel Piñol	Lacson–Sotto slate	Nationalist People's Coalition	3,544,283	6.38
Minguita Padilla	Lacson–Sotto slate	Partido para sa Demokratikong Reporma	3,541,038	6.37
Luke Espiritu	Laban ng Masa	Partido Lakas ng Masa	3,470,550	6.25
Astra Pimentel-Naik	Tuloy ang Pagbabago	PDP–Laban	2,975,908	5.36
Sonny Matula	Team Robredo–Pangilinan	Independent	2,692,565	4.85
Greco Belgica	Tuloy ang Pagbabago	Pederalismo ng Dugong Dakilang Samahan	2,349,040	4.23
Jopet Sison	Aksyon Demokratiko		2,218,095	3.99
Samira Gutoc	Aksyon Demokratiko		1,834,705	3.30
Carmen Zubiaga	Independent		1,763,898	3.18
Silvestre Bello Jr.	PDP–Laban		1,738,387	3.13
Elmer Labog	Makabayan		1,578,385	2.84
Rey Langit	Tuloy ang Pagbabago	PDP–Laban	1,364,548	2.46
Melchor Chavez	Labor Party Philippines		953,241	1.72
Abner Afuang	Independent		901,196	1.62
Roy Cabonegro	Laban ng Masa	Partido Lakas ng Masa	880,919	1.59
Ibrahim Albani	Labor Party Philippines		792,117	1.43
Lutgardo Barbo	MP3 Alliance	PDP–Laban	749,472	1.35
John Castriciones	Tuloy ang Pagbabago	PDP–Laban	712,852	1.28
David d'Angelo	Laban ng Masa	Partido Lakas ng Masa	693,932	1.25
Agnes Bailen	Independent		670,678	1.21
Nur-Mahal Kiram	Independent		585,337	1.05
Nur-Ana Sahidulla	Pederalismo ng Dugong Dakilang Samahan		572,645	1.03
Leo Olarte	Bigkis Pinoy Movement		567,649	1.02
Ariel Lim	Independent		560,660	1.01
Fernando Diaz	Partido Pilipino sa Pagbabago		557,522	1.00
Jesus Arranza	Independent		526,705	0.95
Willie Ricablanca Jr.	Partido Maharlika		490,712	0.88
RJ Javellana	Independent		471,999	0.85
Marieta Mindalano-Adam	Katipunan ng Kamalayang Kayumanggi		446,295	0.80
Ernie Ereño	Partido Maharlika		408,366	0.74
Baldomero Falcone	Democratic Party of the Philippines		396,527	0.71
Emily Mallillin	Partido Pederal ng Maharlika		390,134	0.70
Rey Valeros	Independent		353,730	0.64
Total			431,983,947	100.00
Total votes			55,549,791	–
Registered voters/turnout			66,839,976	83.11
Source: COMELEC

==== House of Representatives ====
Results of the House of Representatives elections

All 316 seats in the House were up for election, an increase of 12 seats from the outgoing 18th Congress. There are now 253 congressional districts, each electing one representative, and 63 seats elected via the party-list system on a nationwide vote. There were 733 people who filed to run in congressional districts. A total of 177 parties contested the party-list election.

After the election, allies of President-elect Bongbong Marcos obtained a supermajority in the House. Martin Romauldez, a cousin of Marcos, was subsequently elected Speaker.

===== By congressional district =====
Party	Votes	%	+/–	Seats	+/–
PDP–Laban	10,950,696	22.77	−8.45	66	−16
Nacionalista Party	6,610,876	13.75	−2.35	36	−6
National Unity Party	6,087,288	12.66	+3.15	33	+8
Nationalist People's Coalition	5,637,211	11.72	−2.59	35	−2
Lakas–CMD	4,432,113	9.22	+4.11	26	+14
Liberal Party	1,823,426	3.79	−1.94	10	−8
Hugpong ng Pagbabago	1,223,815	2.54	+0.93	6	+3
People's Reform Party	942,719	1.96	+1.62	3	+2
Aksyon Demokratiko	868,668	1.81	+0.83	0	0
Partido Pilipino sa Pagbabago	503,827	1.05	New	0	0
Partido para sa Demokratikong Reporma	478,031	0.99	New	2	New
Partido Federal ng Pilipinas	458,038	0.95	−1.43	2	−3
Pederalismo ng Dugong Dakilang Samahan	426,451	0.89	+0.25	2	New
National Unity Party/One Cebu	423,818	0.88	New	2	New
Laban ng Demokratikong Pilipino	373,988	0.78	+0.16	1	−1
Bukidnon Paglaum	336,266	0.70	−0.13	2	0
Unang Sigaw	313,521	0.65	+0.35	0	0
United Bangsamoro Justice Party	292,110	0.61	New	0	0
PROMDI	288,049	0.60	New	0	0
National Unity Party/United Negros Alliance	254,355	0.53	New	2	New
Padayon Pilipino	245,206	0.51	+0.27	2	New
Aksyon Demokratiko/Asenso Manileño	240,559	0.50	New	3	New
Kilusang Bagong Lipunan	213,950	0.44	+0.36	0	0
People's Champ Movement	204,076	0.42	New	1	New
Nacionalista Party/Bileg Ti Ilokano	201,418	0.42	New	1	New
National Unity Party/Asenso Manileño	165,577	0.34	New	2	New
Sulong Zambales Party	144,060	0.30	New	1	New
Mindoro bago Sarili	142,095	0.30	New	1	New
Basilan Unity Party	137,976	0.29	New	1	New
Centrist Democratic Party of the Philippines	128,134	0.27	+0.07	1	0
United Benguet Party	123,801	0.26	New	1	New
Partido Pederal ng Maharlika	104,588	0.22	New	0	0
Bigkis Pinoy Movement	94,571	0.20	New	0	0
Nationalist People's Coalition/Asenso Manileño	90,075	0.19	New	1	New
Partido Navoteño	79,505	0.17	−0.03	1	0
Partido Demokratiko Sosyalista ng Pilipinas	78,029	0.16	+0.02	0	0
Lakas–CMD/United Negros Alliance	76,115	0.16	New	0	New
Hugpong sa Tawong Lungsod	73,796	0.15	−0.34	0	−1
Adelante Zamboanga Party	73,785	0.15	+0.08	1	New
Samahang Kaagapay ng Agilang Pilipino	73,346	0.15	New	0	0
Partidong Pagbabago ng Palawan	71,986	0.15	−0.31	0	−2
Reform Party	70,116	0.15	New	0	0
United Nationalist Alliance	68,572	0.14	−0.43	1	New
Partido Prosperidad y Amor para na Zamboanga	67,133	0.14	New	0	0
Lingkod ng Mamamayan ng Valenzuela City	50,599	0.11	New	0	0
Labor Party Philippines	50,150	0.10	+0.08	0	0
Achievers with Integrity Movement	48,462	0.10	New	0	0
PDP–Laban/Partido Siquijodnon	33,989	0.07	New	1	New
Ummah Party	29,043	0.06	New	0	0
Ang Kapatiran	17,484	0.04	New	0	0
Pwersa ng Masang Pilipino	10,642	0.02	−0.96	0	−1
Partido Lakas ng Masa	5,223	0.01	New	0	0
Philippine Green Republican Party	4,856	0.01	+0.01	0	0
Katipunan ng Nagkakaisang Pilipino	4,370	0.01	−0.28	0	0
Katipunan ng Kamalayang Kayumanggi	2,295	0.00	New	0	0
Bagumbayan–VNP	1,607	0.00	−0.08	0	0
Independent	2,137,093	4.44	−0.53	6	+4
Party-list seats				63	+2
Total	48,089,548	100.00	–	316	+12
Valid votes	48,089,548	86.98	+0.64		
Invalid/blank votes	7,201,273	13.02	−0.64		
Total votes	55,290,821	100.00	–		
Registered voters/turnout	65,745,526	84.10	+8.20		
Source: COMELEC (Results per individual province/city, election day turnout, absentee turnout

===== By party list =====
Party	Votes	%	+/–	Seats	+/–
ACT-CIS Partylist	2,111,091	5.80	−3.77	3	0
1-Rider Partylist	1,001,243	2.75	New	2	New
Tingog Party List	886,959	2.44	+1.01	2	+1
4Ps Party-list	848,237	2.33	New	2	New
Ako Bicol	816,445	2.24	−1.54	2	0
SAGIP Partylist	780,456	2.14	+1.20	2	+1
Ang Probinsyano Party-list	714,634	1.96	−0.82	1	−1
Uswag Ilonggo	689,607	1.89	New	1	New
Tutok To Win Party-List	685,578	1.88	New	1	New
Citizens' Battle Against Corruption	637,044	1.75	−1.60	1	−1
Senior Citizens Partylist	614,671	1.69	−0.18	1	0
Duterte Youth	602,196	1.65	+0.37	1	0
Agimat Partylist	586,909	1.61	New	1	New
Kabataan	536,690	1.47	+0.76	1	0
ANGAT Party List	530,485	1.46	New	1	New
Marino Party List	530,382	1.46	−1.00	1	−1
Ako Bisaya	512,795	1.41	−0.02	1	0
Probinsyano Ako	471,904	1.30	−0.98	1	−1
LPG Marketers Association	453,895	1.25	+0.48	1	0
Abante Pangasinan-Ilokano Party	451,372	1.24	New	1	New
Gabriela Women's Party	423,891	1.16	−0.46	1	0
Construction Workers Solidarity	412,333	1.13	+0.12	1	0
AGRI Partylist	393,987	1.08	+0.59	1	+1
P3PWD	391,174	1.07	New	1	New
Ako Ilocano Ako	387,086	1.06	New	1	New
Kusug Tausug	385,770	1.06	+0.23	1	0
Kalinga Partylist	374,308	1.03	−0.20	1	0
AGAP Partylist	367,533	1.01	+0.25	1	0
Coop-NATCCO	346,341	0.95	−0.56	1	0
Malasakit@Bayanihan	345,199	0.95	New	1	New
Barangay Health Wellness Partylist	335,598	0.92	−0.06	1	0
Galing sa Puso Party	333,817	0.92	+0.02	1	0
Bagong Henerasyon	330,937	0.91	−0.14	1	0
Alliance of Concerned Teachers	330,529	0.91	−0.52	1	0
TGP Partylist	327,912	0.90	+0.11	1	0
Bicol Saro	325,371	0.89	New	1	New
United Senior Citizens Partylist (Note: United Senior Citizens is entitled to a seat in Congress based on the results. However, as of May 25th, they have not been proclaimed as they have a pending case in the COMELEC regarding their accreditation. United Senior Citizens was later proclaimed as a winning party, with its nominee being sworn in in November 2022.)	320,627	0.88	New	1	New
DUMPER Partylist	314,618	0.86	+0.05	1	0
Pinuno Partylist	299,990	0.82	New	1	New
Abang Lingkod	296,800	0.82	−0.18	1	0
PBA Partylist	294,619	0.81	−0.37	1	0
OFW Partylist	293,301	0.81	New	1	New
Abono Partylist	288,752	0.79	−0.58	1	0
Anakalusugan	281,512	0.77	−0.09	1	0
Kabalikat ng Mamamayan	280,066	0.77	+0.05	1	0
Magsasaka Partylist	276,889	0.76	−1.03	1	0
1-Pacman Party List	273,195	0.75	−1.82	1	−1
APEC Partylist	271,380	0.75	−0.98	1	0
Pusong Pinoy	262,044	0.72	New	1	New
Trade Union Congress Party	260,779	0.72	−0.21	1	0
Patrol Partylist	252,571	0.69	−0.09	1	0
Manila Teachers Party-List	249,525	0.69	−0.21	1	0
AAMBIS-Owa Party List	246,053	0.68	−0.17	1	0
Philreca Party-List	243,487	0.67	−0.76	1	0
Alona Party List	238,704	0.66	−0.50	1	0
Akbayan (Note: Akbayan was later proclaimed as a winning party, with its nominee set to be sworn in by September 2024, after the Supreme Court affirmed the COMELEC's decision to cancel the registration of An Waray in September 2024.)	236,226	0.65	+0.02	1	+1
Democratic Independent Workers Association	234,996	0.65	−0.06	0	−1
Asenso Pinoy	232,229	0.64	New	0	0
Ipeace Epanaw (Note: This partylist was rejected by COMELEC from joining the 2022 elections, but has secured a Temporary Restraining Order from the Supreme Court. Because of this, they have been included in the ballot and their votes are counted for calculation purposes.)	230,315	0.63	New	0	0
Ang Pamilya Muna	225,041	0.62	New	0	0
A Teacher Partylist	221,327	0.61	−0.38	0	−1
Bayan Muna	219,848	0.60	−3.41	0	−3
1CARE Party-list	218,215	0.60	+0.13	0	0
YACAP Partylist	214,694	0.59	−0.02	0	0
Kasama Partylist	213,539	0.59	New	0	0
Ako Bisdak Partylist	204,111	0.56	+0.37	0	0
Abante Sambayanan	201,961	0.55	New	0	0
1-APTO	183,869	0.50	New	0	0
Angat Pinoy Partylist	174,452	0.48	New	0	0
TODA Partylist	174,396	0.48	New	0	0
AKO OFW Partylist	169,177	0.46	New	0	0
PNP Retirees Association	160,418	0.44	+0.15	0	0
SMILE Partylist	158,245	0.43	New	0	0
Pamilyang Magsasaka	158,034	0.43	New	0	0
PEACE Party-list	157,617	0.43	0.00	0	0
Bayaning Tsuper	157,278	0.43	New	0	0
ACTS-OFW	155,072	0.43	−0.05	0	0
Buklod Filipino Party List	151,502	0.42	+0.34	0	0
Tulungan Tayo	147,050	0.40	New	0	0
Filipino Rights Protection Advocates of Manila Movement	144,969	0.40	New	0	0
BAHAY Partylist	142,676	0.39	−0.62	0	−1
Trabaho Partylist	138,973	0.38	New	0	0
Anak Mindanao	134,647	0.37	−0.39	0	−1
Ako Padayon Pilipino Party List	132,222	0.36	−0.48	0	−1
CANCER Partylist	128,284	0.35	New	0	0
Kamalayan	126,393	0.35	New	0	0
Magdalo Party-List	119,189	0.33	−0.59	0	−1
PDP Cares Foundation	117,139	0.32	New	0	0
RECOBADA Partylist	117,126	0.32	−0.82	0	−1
Act as One Philippines	116,173	0.32	New	0	0
Koop-KAMPI Partylist	114,587	0.31	+0.13	0	0
WIFI Partylist	113,971	0.31	New	0	0
Bisaya Gyud Party-List	113,388	0.31	New	0	0
Hugpong Federal Movement of the Philippines	112,654	0.31	New	0	0
Moro Ako - Ok Party-List	110,171	0.30	New	0	0
Angkla Patylist	109,343	0.30	−0.35	0	0
ANAC-IP Partylist	108,807	0.30	New	0	0
Passengers and Riders Organization	108,647	0.30	New	0	0
Ang Kabuhayan Partylist	108,535	0.30	+0.02	0	0
Ang Tinig ng Seniors Citizens	104,957	0.29	New	0	0
Lungsod Aasenso	103,149	0.28	New	0	0
Buhay Party-List	103,077	0.28	−1.02	0	−1
Una ang Edukasyon	102,687	0.28	−0.15	0	0
Igorot Warriors International, Inc.	95,217	0.26	New	0	0
OFW Family Club	93,059	0.26	−0.47	0	−1
HELP Pilipinas	93,007	0.26	New	0	0
Wow Pilipinas Movement	90,698	0.25	−0.37	0	0
Kapamilya ng Manggagawang Pilipino	89,695	0.25	New	0	0
Aasenso Partylist	88,611	0.24	−0.03	0	0
FPJ Partylist	88,564	0.24	New	0	0
Butil Farmers Party	87,305	0.24	−0.35	0	0
Abante Pilipinas	87,211	0.24	−0.11	0	0
Subanen Party-List	86,533	0.24	New	0	0
Turismo Isulong Mo	86,119	0.24	New	0	0
Abe Kapampangan	85,226	0.23	−0.07	0	0
Barkadahan para sa Bansa	83,860	0.23	New	0	0
Anakpawis	81,436	0.22	−0.31	0	0
UMA Ilonggo Party-List	73,454	0.20	New	0	0
Ang Kabuhayang Kayang Kaya	72,547	0.20	New	0	0
NASECORE Partylist	71,822	0.20	−0.09	0	0
Rebolusyonaryong Alyansang Makabansa	69,740	0.19	−0.66	0	−1
Ayuda sa May Kapansanan	66,457	0.18	New	0	0
Ang Bumbero ng Pilipinas	65,929	0.18	New	0	0
Kilusang Maypagasa	65,133	0.18	−0.10	0	0
Mothers for Change	64,785	0.18	New	0	0
One Coop	64,627	0.18	New	0	0
Ang Komadrona	64,087	0.18	New	0	0
STL Partylist	60,384	0.17	New	0	0
Malabung Workers Party	59,499	0.16	New	0	0
Ang Laban ng Indiginong Filipino	58,658	0.16	−0.09	0	0
Kabalikat ng Bayan sa Kaunlaran	57,692	0.16	New	0	0
Bunyog Party	57,030	0.16	New	0	0
CLICK Partylist	55,842	0.15	New	0	0
KAPUSO PM	53,635	0.15	New	0	0
HOME OWNER Partylist	53,560	0.15	New	0	0
Kilos Mamamayan Ngayon Na	52,205	0.14	New	0	0
United Frontliners of the Philippines	50,849	0.14	New	0	0
Alsa Bisaya	47,415	0.13	New	0	0
Bangon Philippine Outsourcing	47,382	0.13	New	0	0
Lingkud Bayanihan Party	43,896	0.12	New	0	0
Maharlikang Pilipino Party	43,260	0.12	New	0	0
ARTE Partylist	42,086	0.12	New	0	0
Ipatupad for Workers Inc.	41,797	0.11	New	0	0
Kabalikat Partylist	39,344	0.11	+0.01	0	0
Babae Ako para sa Bayan	39,254	0.11	New	0	0
Damayan Partylist	36,394	0.10	New	0	0
Partido Cocoman	35,583	0.10	New	0	0
Aktibong Kaagapay ng mga Manggagawa	34,338	0.09	New	0	0
Ako Breeder Party-List	32,630	0.09	New	0	0
Ako Musikero Association	28,297	0.08	New	0	0
Philippine Society for Industrial Security	27,851	0.08	New	0	0
Ang Koalisyon ng Indigenous People	27,583	0.08	New	0	0
Aksyon Magsasaka-Partido Tinig ng Masa	27,364	0.08	−0.62	0	0
Mindoro Sandugo para sa Kaunlaran	26,800	0.07	New	0	0
Samahang Ilaw at Bisig	25,871	0.07	New	0	0
1-UTAP Bicol	23,021	0.06	−0.02	0	0
Alagaan ang Sambayanang Pilipino	22,543	0.06	New	0	0
Parents Teachers Alliance	22,319	0.06	−0.04	0	0
APAT-DAPAT Partylist	20,949	0.06	New	0	0
Arts Business and Science Professionals	20,149	0.06	−0.06	0	0
ARISE Partylist	20,131	0.06	New	0	0
Maagap Partylist	19,645	0.05	New	0	0
Solid Change Partylist	18,954	0.05	New	0	0
Marvelous Tayo	18,172	0.05	+0.01	0	0
Alternatiba ng Masa	18,048	0.05	New	0	0
Partido Lakas ng Masa	17,783	0.05	−0.05	0	0
PASADA CC Partylist	17,406	0.05	New	0	0
UFCC Party-List	16,733	0.05	New	0	0
AKAP Pinoy Partylist	16,116	0.04	New	0	0
PVAID Partylist	14,330	0.04	New	0	0
National Firemen's Confederation of the Philippines	11,692	0.03	New	0	0
LIBRO Partylist	11,067	0.03	New	0	0
1 Tahanan	10,383	0.03	New	0	0
Pilipinas para sa Pinoy	8,774	0.02	−0.03	0	0
Aangat Kusinerong Pinoy	8,261	0.02	New	0	0
Kusog Bikolandia	7,840	0.02	New	0	0
Total	36,416,604	100.00	–	63	+2
Valid votes	36,416,604	65.45	+6.49		
Invalid/blank votes (Note: Includes 385,460 votes for An Waray, which COMELEC had cancelled its certificate of registration in August 2023, after it had allowed its nominee Victoria Isabel Noel assume a seat in the House of Representatives starting in 2016 without proper authority. The House of Representatives then dropped from the rolls Bem Noel in September 2023, removing him from office. The Supreme Court affirmed the COMELEC's decision in September 2024.)	19,226,791	34.55	−6.49		
Total votes	55,643,395	100.00	–		
Registered voters/turnout	67,523,697	82.41	+8.67		
Source: COMELEC

=== Local ===
Local elections above the barangay level were held along with the national elections:

- All 81 governors and vice governors, and 782 seats to provincial boards in all provinces
- All 146 city mayors and vice mayors, and 1,650 seats to city councils in all cities
- All 1,488 municipal mayors and vice mayors, and 11,908 seats to municipal councils in all municipalities

== In popular culture ==
- A "two joints" hand gesture in support of Isko Moreno went viral during the campaign
- A chant in support of Leni Robredo called "Ang Presidente, Bise Presidente" was turned into a song by Gabriel Valenciano
- "Bagong Pagsilang", a march commissioned in 1973 during the presidency of Ferdinand Marcos, was re-released in 2022 with a new version for Bongbong Marcos's campaign
- Yorme: The Isko Domagoso Story, a biographical film about Isko Moreno, was released in January 2022
