= Panfilo Lacson 2022 presidential campaign =

Presidential campaign for the 2022 Philippine presidential elections

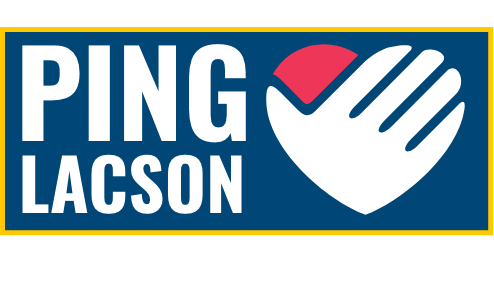
- Campaign: 2022 Philippine presidential election
- Candidate: Panfilo Lacson (Presidential candidate) Tito Sotto (Vice presidential candidate)
- Affiliation: NPC; UNA; Partido Reporma (de jure (Note: Partido Reporma previously nominated Lacson as its presidential candidate until March 24, 2022, when it endorses Leni Robredo as its guest presidential nominee. While Lacson will now run as independent candidate, Reporma continues to endorse his running mate Tito Sotto as vice-presidential nominee, and will still reflected as Lacson's party on official ballots.))
- Status: Official launch: September 8, 2021; Lost election: May 9, 2022; Conceded: May 10, 2022
- Slogan(s): Katapangan, Kakayahan at Katapatan transl. (Courage, Competence and Honesty); Aayusin ang Gobyerno, Aayusin ang Buhay Mo transl. ([We'll] Fix the Government, Fix your Life)

The 2022 presidential campaign of Panfilo Lacson was announced in a televised launch on September 8, 2021, along with his running mate Tito Sotto. Panfilo Lacson is a three-term senator of the Philippines and former chief of the Philippine National Police, while Sotto is a four-term senator who served as the president of the senate from 2018 to 2022.

Lacson and Sotto were the first tandem to announce their candidacy for president and vice president, respectively, for the 2022 Philippine presidential election. Both candidates lost to the tandem of Bongbong Marcos and Sara Duterte, respectively.

== Background ==
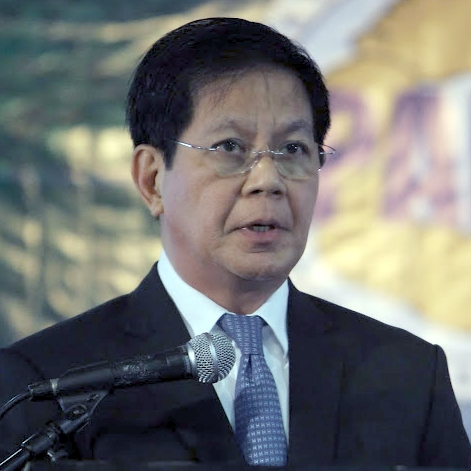
Panfilo Lacson

Panfilo Lacson, more commonly known as Ping Lacson, a graduate of the Philippine Military Academy first served in the Philippine Constabulary, holding numerous positions throughout his entire career. During the administration of President Joseph Estrada, he was appointed as head of the Presidential Anti-Organized Crime Task Force and eventually as PNP Chief. During the Second EDSA Revolution, Lacson along with several PNP officers withdrew their support to President Estrada and eventually resigned from his post.

Lacson then ran and won for a Senate seat in 2001 and was reelected in 2007. Lacson earned the reputation of being the only Philippine Senator who didn't receive any Priority Development Assistance Fund or Pork Barrel during his term in the Senate. He also ran for the presidency in 2004, but lost to then-incumbent Gloria Macapagal Arroyo placing third in the presidential race.

After he finished his term in the Senate, Lacson was appointed by then-President Benigno Aquino III as Presidential Assistant on Rehabilitation and Recovery which is tasked for the rehabilitation of areas that were destructed by the Typhoon Yolanda.

=== Running mate ===
Vicente Sotto III, who is known in the entertainment industry as Tito Sotto is a known composer, comedian and TV host, being one of the most famous trio Tito, Vic and Joey or TVJ along with his younger brother Vic Sotto and Joey De Leon. He is also known as one of the original hosts of the longest-running noontime show Eat Bulaga!.

He started his political career in 1988 when he won as Vice Mayor of Quezon City. In 1992, Sotto ran for a Senate seat and placed as the topnotcher in the polls. He was then reelected in 1998. In 2007, he failed to reclaim his seat in the Senate and was appointed as Chairman of the Dangerous Drugs Board a year after.

In 2010, Sotto reclaimed his post in the Senate. During his first term, he held the position of Senate Majority Floor Leader. In 2016, Sotto was once again reelected and took the position of Senate President in 2018 up to the present.

Sotto stated that he is running for the position of Vice President, if his colleague Panfilo Lacson will run for president. President Rodrigo Duterte in his sixth and final State of the Nation Address also called Sotto as the next vice president.

== Campaign ==
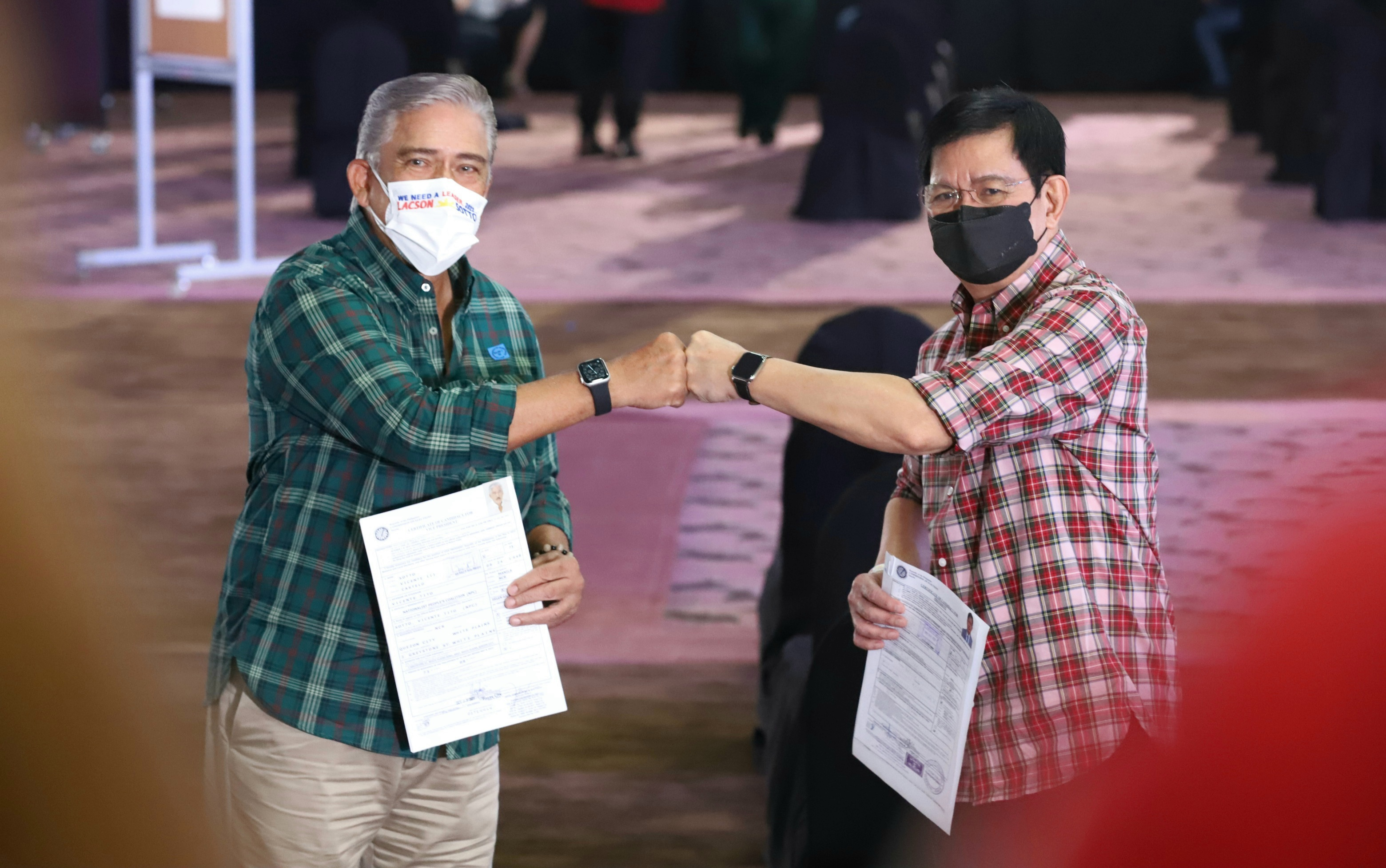
Lacson (right) and his running mate Sotto (left) filing their certificates of candidacy on October 6, 2021

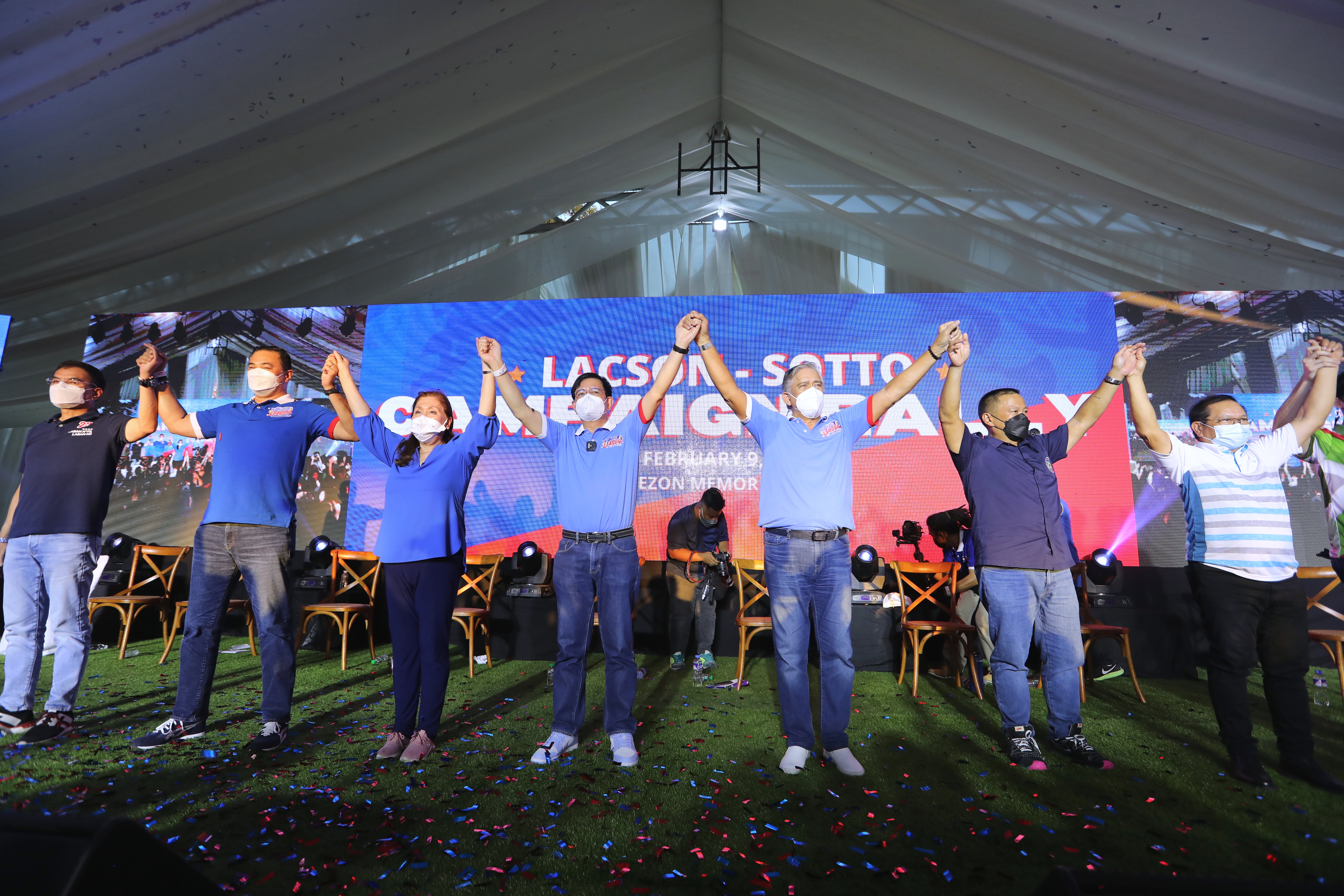
Lacson, Sotto, and their senatorial slate during a campaign rally on February 9, 2022.

By June 2021, Lacson and Sotto visited some provinces in Luzon for a series of consultative meetings.

On July 20, 2021, Lacson confirmed that he was running for president with Tito Sotto as his running mate for vice president. Both Lacson and Sotto reiterated that they are not "pro or anti-administration" but are alternative candidates.

On September 8, 2021, Lacson and Sotto officially launched their presidential and vice-presidential bid in a televised event entitled Ito ang Simula (lit. transl. This is the Beginning) which was attended by mostly family and friends of both candidates. The 30-minute event, which was aired on almost all television stations and through the internet, was taped in an undisclosed location with a mixture of both live (composed only of friends of both Lacson and Sotto) and virtual audience. According to them, their combined 83 years of public service (50 years for Lacson, 33 years for Sotto) are their main qualifications.

The tandem officially launched their proclamation rally at the City of Imus Grandstand and Track Oval, at the official start of the 2022 Philippine presidential election campaign period on February 8, 2022.

On March 24, Lacson resigned as chairperson and member of Partido Reporma a few hours before the party's leaders endorsed the presidential bid of Vice President Leni Robredo. Reporma's president, Representative Pantaleon Alvarez, praised Lacson's experience in government and called him the "most qualified" to be the next president of the Philippines. However, Lacson's poor performance in pre-election opinion polls forced the party to consider another candidate. Lacson announced that he "harbor[s] no ill-feelings" towards his former party, and would continue his presidential bid as an independent candidate. However, on official ballots, Reporma will still be indicated as his affiliation based on the certificate of candidacy he filed in October 2021. On the following day, Lacson claimed that Reporma's withdrawal of support "was actually more about the issue of campaign expenses." Lacson disclosed that Alvarez's chief of staff requested him for ₱800 million to fund the party's campaign, an amount he was unable to produce. Alvarez denied Lacson's accusation, asserting that the party "can very well fund its own candidates," but admitted that the issue of funding was a major consideration in their change of support. Robredo's team also denied giving ₱800 million to Reporma in exchange for their support. Meanwhile, Partido Reporma founder and chairman emeritus Renato de Villa would continue to support Lacson.

Lacson's campaign was also hampered by his poor standings in the pre-election surveys.

== Senatorial slate ==
Lacson and Sotto also bared their list of their senatorial candidates for the 2022 Philippine Senate election. Among those include:

- Jojo Binay, former vice president of the Philippines (UNA)
- JV Ejercito, former Senator (NPC)
- Ret. Police Gen. Guillermo Eleazar, former Chief of the Philippine National Police (PDR)
- Chiz Escudero, former Senator, incumbent Governor of Sorsogon (NPC)
- Richard Gordon, incumbent Senator (BVNP)
- Gringo Honasan, former secretary of information and communications technology (Independent)
- Loren Legarda, former Senator, incumbent representative of Antique lone district, current house deputy speaker (NPC)
- Minguita Padilla, physician, Eye Bank Foundation president and former head executive staff of the Department of Health (Reporma)
- Emmanuel Piñol, former Secretary of Agriculture and former Mindanao Development Authority chairman (NPC)
- Raffy Tulfo, broadcaster (Independent)
- Joel Villanueva, incumbent Senator (Independent)
- Dropped candidates (candidates who were part of the line up but removed lately):
  - Herbert Bautista, former mayor of Quezon City (NPC)
  - Monsour del Rosario, former Member of the Philippine House of Representatives from Makati's 1st district (Reporma)
  - Win Gatchalian, incumbent senator (NPC)
  - Migz Zubiri, incumbent senate majority leader (Independent)

One of their senatorial candidates, media practitioner Paolo Capino, withdrew his candidacy. He was substituted by former Philippine National Police chief Guillermo Eleazar, who had just retired from his post. Former mayor of Quezon City Herbert Bautista of NPC and Senator Sherwin Gatchalian were also part of Lacson's slate but were later removed after joining the UniTeam alliance. After Lacson's resignation from Reporma, Monsour del Rosario announced his support for Leni Robredo's presidential campaign. On April 4, reelectionist senator Migz Zubiri was dropped from the slate after openly endorsing the campaign of Bongbong Marcos.

== Endorsements ==
Panfilo Lacson

National-level cabinet and executive officials

- Honorio Azcueta, Former Undersecretary of Defense
- Kim Henares, Commissioner of the Bureau of Internal Revenue (2010–2016)
- Orlando Mercado, Secretary of National Defense (1998–2001)
- Eliseo Rio, Secretary of Information and Communications Technology (2017–2019)

Military officials

- Renato De Villa, Secretary of National Defense (1991–1997), Chief of Staff of the Armed Forces of the Philippines (1988–1991), Executive Secretary (2001), 1998 Philippine presidential candidate, Chairman of Partido para sa Demokratikong Reporma

Philippine Congress

- Romeo Acop, Antipolo's 1st district representative (2010–2019)
- ~~Pantaleon Alvarez, Davao del Norte's 1st district representative (1998–2001, 2019–present), Speaker of the House of Representatives (2016–2018)~~ (switched endorsement to Leni Robredo)

Provincial and local officials

- ~~Edwin Jubahib, Governor of Davao del Norte (2019–present)~~ (switched endorsement to Leni Robredo)
- Benjamin Magalong, Mayor of Baguio (2019–present)
- Emmanuel Maliksi, Mayor of Imus, Cavite (2007–2010, 2011–present)
- Joseph Rañola, Mayor of Jagna, Bohol

Entertainment personalities

- Wally Bayola, television host, comedian, Tito Sotto's co-host on Eat Bulaga!
- Joey de Leon, television host, comedian, Sotto's co-host on Eat Bulaga!
- Pauleen Luna-Sotto, television host, actress, Sotto's sister-in-law and co-host on Eat Bulaga!
- Jose Manalo, television host, comedian, Sotto's co-host on Eat Bulaga!
- Iwa Moto, actress, daughter-in-law of Panfilo Lacson
- Ciara Sotto, actress, Sotto's daughter
- Vic Sotto, television host, actor, Sotto's brother and co-host on Eat Bulaga!
Tito Sotto

Military officials

- Renato De Villa, Secretary of National Defense (1991–1997), Chief of Staff of the Armed Forces of the Philippines (1988–1991), Executive Secretary (2001), 1998 Philippine presidential candidate, Chairman of Partido para sa Demokratikong Reporma

Philippine Congress

- Pantaleon Alvarez, Davao del Norte's 1st district representative (1998–2001, 2019–present), Speaker of the House of Representatives (2016–2018)

Provincial and local officials

- Joy Belmonte, Mayor of Quezon City, Metro Manila (2019–present), Vice Mayor of Quezon City (2010–2019)
- Edwin Jubahib, Governor of Davao del Norte (2019–present)
- Eugenio Jose Lacson, Governor of Negros Occidental (2019–present), Vice Governor of Negros Occidental (2013–2019), Mayor of San Carlos, Negros Occidental (2001–2010)
- Benjamin Magalong, Mayor of Baguio (2019–present)
- Emmanuel Maliksi, Mayor of Imus, Cavite (2007–2010, 2011–present)
- Joseph Rañola, Mayor of Jagna, Bohol
- Gian Sotto, Vice Mayor of Quezon City (2019–present), actor

Entertainment personalities

- Kakai Bautista, actress, comedian, singer
- Wally Bayola, television host, comedian, Tito Sotto's co-host on Eat Bulaga!
- Joey de Leon, television host, comedian, Sotto's co-host on Eat Bulaga!
- Pauleen Luna-Sotto, television host, actress, Sotto's sister-in-law and co-host on Eat Bulaga!
- Jose Manalo, television host, comedian, Sotto's co-host on Eat Bulaga!
- Iwa Moto, actress, daughter-in-law of Panfilo Lacson
- Maja Salvador, actress, singer, co-host on Eat Bulaga!
- Ciara Sotto, actress, Sotto's daughter
- Vic Sotto, television host, actor, Sotto's brother and co-host on Eat Bulaga!

Organizations

- Bando Osmeña – Pundok Kauswagan
- Serbisyo sa Bayan Party (Quezon City)

Others

- Rizalito David, rival vice presidential candidate

== See also ==
- Panfilo Lacson 2004 presidential campaign
- Panfilo Lacson 2010 presidential campaign
