= 2019 Lipa local elections =

2019 Lipa mayoral election
- May 13, 2019
Nominee	Eric Africa	Bernadette Sabili	Mario Panganiban
Party	Nacionalista	NPC	Independent
Running mate	Mark Aries Luancing	Ruben Umali	Ricardo Leyesa
Popular vote	78,109	76,511	2,575
Percentage	49.68	48.67	1.63
Mayor before election
Meynardo Sabili
NPC
Elected mayor
Eric Africa
Nacionalista

Lipa City held its local elections on Monday, May 13, 2019, as a part of the 2019 Philippine general election. The voters will elect candidates for the elective local posts in the city: the mayor, vice mayor, the congressman (which will represent Batangas' sixth district which is composed of just the city), two provincial board members, and the 12 members of its city council.

There are a total of 162,042 people who voted out of the 200,706 registered voters. Incumbent Vice Mayor Eric Africa won in the mayoralty race garnering 78,109 votes. Africa had 1,598 votes over his closest rival Bernadette Sabili, wife of incumbent Mayor Meynardo Sabili. Incumbent councilor Mark Aries Luancing won as vice mayor.

== Background ==
=== Mayoral and Vice Mayoral elections ===
Incumbent Mayor Meynardo Sabili is now on his third and final term as Mayor of the City of Lipa. He assumed the mayorship in 2010, defeating then-incumbent and former 4th District Representative Oscar Gozos. This is despite Sabili's disqualification to run because of residency dispute. Sabili, a former Provincial Board Member used to be a registered voter Barangay Sico 1, San Juan, Batangas and transferred to Barangay Pinagtong-Ulan, Lipa City. However, the Supreme Court annulled and dismissed the Commission on Elections' ruling on Sabili's cancellation of his Certificate of Candidacy. He is running for representative of the 6th District of Batangas, which comprises only the city itself, under the Nationalist People's Coalition. His wife, Bernadette Sabili is his party's nominee. This will be Sabili's third time that she will run in the elections. She first ran for Representative of the 4th District of Batangas, when Lipa is still part of that district, but was defeated by then-incumbent Mark Llandro Mendoza. She then ran again for representative of the newly created 6th District, but was defeated again by former Mayor and then-incumbent Batangas Governor Vilma Santos-Recto. If elected, she will be the city's second female mayor next to Santos-Recto. Her running mate is former City Mayor Ruben Umali. Umali served as city mayor from 1986 to 1998. Sabili's platform is to continue the programs of her husband.

Her opponents are incumbent Vice Mayor Eric Africa who is running under the Nacionalista Party, the party of incumbent Representative and former City Mayor and Governor Vilma Santos-Recto. Africa served as city councilor from 1998 to 2007 and from 2010 to 2013 before being elected as vice mayor in 2013 and reelected in 2016. His running mate is incumbent councilor Mark Aries Luancing. Their platform is to resolve the problems that the city is enduring such as the worsening traffic in the city and garbage problems in the city. Another mayoralty candidate is lawyer Mario Panganiban with Ricardo Leyesa as his running mate. Incumbent councilor Merlo Silva is running as vice mayor.

=== Congressional election ===
Incumbent representative Vilma Santos-Recto, is running for reelection. Recto became its first female city mayor from 1998 until she was elected first female governor of Batangas in 2007 and became the first representative of the newly created 6th District of Batangas, which comprises only the city itself. Her main opponent is incumbent mayor Meynard Sabili who is running under the Nationalist People's Coalition. This is Sabili's third congressional attempt. He ran in 2001 and 2007 as Representative of the 4th District of Batangas (where Lipa is still part of it), but was defeated by his erstwhile predecessor Oscar Gozos and Mark Llandro Mendoza, respectively. However, NPC withdrew his nomination two hours before the deadline of filing of Certificates of Candidacies. However, in the certified list of candidates and in the official ballot, Sabili is still running under NPC.

== Congressional election ==
=== 6th District (Lipa City) ===
Incumbent Vilma Santos-Recto is running for reelection. Her main opponent is incumbent Lipa Mayor Meynardo Sabili.

2019 Philippine House of Representatives election in Batangas's 6th District (Lone District of Lipa City)
Party	Candidate	Votes	%
Nacionalista	Vilma Santos-Recto	96,743	61.01
NPC	Meynardo Sabili	61,821	38.98
Total votes		158,570	100.00
Nacionalista hold			

== Provincial Board Elections ==
=== 6th District ===
Incumbent Lydio Lopez, Jr. is running for reelection. Incumbent Rowena Africa is term-limited.

2019 Provincial Board Election in 6th District of Batangas
Party	Candidate	Votes	%
Nacionalista	Lydio Lopez, Jr.	95,128	41.37
Nacionalista	Aries Emmanuel Mendoza	73,647	32.03
NPC	Federico Caisip	61,130	26.58
Total votes		229,905	100.00

== Mayoralty and Vice Mayoralty Elections ==
=== Mayor ===
Incumbent Mayor Meynardo Sabili is now on third and final term as Mayor of the City of Lipa and he is ineligible to run for another term. He assumed the mayorship in 2010, defeating then-incumbent and former 4th District Representative Oscar Gozos. This is despite Sabili's disqualification to run because of residency dispute. Sabili, a former Provincial Board Member used to be a registered voter Barangay Sico 1, San Juan, Batangas and transferred to Barangay Pinagtong-Ulan, Lipa City. However, the Supreme Court annulled and dismissed the Commission on Elections' ruling on Sabili's cancellation of his Certificate of Candidacy. He is now running for Representative of the 6th District of Batangas, which only comprises the City of Lipa.

His wife, Bernadette Sabili is running in his place as Mayor. Her opponents is incumbent Vice Mayor Eric Africa and Mario Panganiban.

Lipa City mayoralty elections
Party	Candidate	Votes	%
Nacionalista	Eric Africa	78,109	49.68
NPC	Bernadette Sabili	76,511	48.67
Independent	Mario Panganiban	2,575	1.63
Margin of victory		1,598	0.99%
Valid ballots		157,195	97.01%
Invalid or blank votes		4,874	30.08%
Total votes		162,042	100.00
Nacionalista gain from NPC			

=== Vice Mayor ===
Incumbent Vice Mayor Eric Africa is running for Mayor. His party nominated incumbent councilor Mark Aries Luancing. His main opponents are Ricardo Leyesa, incumbent councilor Merlo Silva and former Mayor Ruben Umali.

Lipa City vice mayoralty elections
Party	Candidate	Votes	%
Nacionalista	Mark Aries Luancing	63,848	42.31
NPC	Ruben Umali	47,795	31.67
Independent	Merlo Silva	36,739	24.35
Independent	Ricardo Leyesa	2,488	1.64
Margin of victory		16,053	5.32%
Valid ballots		150,870	99.07%
Invalid or blank votes		11,172	68.94%
Total votes		162,042	100.00
Nacionalista hold			

== City Council ==
Eight incumbent councilors are running for reelections, upon which both Team Bangon Lipa and Team Sabili-Umali had four reelectionists for each team. Team Bangon Lipa had incumbent councilors Leonilo Catipon, Oscar Gozos II, Camille Angeline Lopez and Avior Rocafort. Both Lopez and Rocafort are former allies of Mayor Meynard Sabili. While Team Sabili-Umali had incumbent councilors Emmanuel De Castro, Nonato Monfero, Joel Pua and Ralph Peter Umali. Incumbents Mark Aries Luancing, Gwendolyn Wong, Merlo Silva, and Aries Emmanuel Mendoza are retiring. Both Luancing and Silva are challengers for City Vice Mayor, Wong is retiring from politics and Mendoza is running for provincial board member.

Incumbents are expressed in italics.

=== By ticket ===
==== Team Bangon Lipa ====
Nacionalista/Team Bangon Lipa
Name	Party	Result
Gerardo America	Nacionalista	Lost
Atty. Gally Angeles	Nacionalista	Won
Nilo Catipon	Nacionalista	Won
Oscar "Junjun" Gozos II	Nacionalista	Won
George Katigbak	Nacionalista	Lost
Mike Lina	Nacionalista	Lost
Camile Lopez	Nacionalista	Won
Aries Macala	Nacionalista	Lost
Mikee Morada	Nacionalista	Won
Avior Rocafort	Nacionalista	Won
Nicole Ronquillo	Nacionalista	Won
Spye Toledo	Nacionalista	Won

==== Team Sabili-Umali ====
NPC/Team Sabili-Umali
Name	Party	Result
Jonas Anciano	NPC	Lost
Emmanuel "Oweng" De Castro	NPC	Lost
Beverly Luancing Luna	NPC	Won
Virgilio Macasaet, Jr.	NPC	Lost
Venice Manalo	NPC	Won
Marcus Dominic Mendoza	NPC	Lost
Nonato "Patmon" Monfero	NPC	Lost
Raul Montealto	NPC	Lost
Joel Pua	NPC	Won
Reman Eric "Emer" Recio	NPC	Lost
Paolo Santino Soriano	NPC	Lost
Ralph Peter "King" Umali	NPC	Won

==== Independent ====
Independent/Team Panganiban
Name	Party
Ramir Bathan	Independent
Rodel Macasael	Independent

=== Councilors ===
As per results of the elections, 8 out of 12 seats were occupied by Team Bangon Lipa. 6 of them are reelectionists (4 from Team Bangon Lipa and 2 from Team Sabili-Umali) while other 6 are newly elected councilors (4 from Team Bangon Lipa and 2 from Team Sabili-Umali).

2019 Lipa City Council Elections
Party	Candidate	Votes	%
Nacionalista	Camille Lopez	91,782	6.23
Nacionalista	Mikee Morada	80,568	5.47
NPC	Joel Pua	77,715	5.27
Nacionalista	Nilo Catipon	75,301	5.11
Nacionalista	Atty. Gally Angeles	73,383	4.98
Nacionalista	Oscar "Junjun" Gozos II	72,609	4.93
NPC	King Umali	71,102	4.82
Nacionalista	Spye Toledo	70,994	4.82
NPC	Beverly Luancing Luna	67,909	4.61
NPC	Venice Manalo	67,138	4.55
Nacionalista	Avior Rocafort	66,095	4.48
Nacionalista	Nicole Ronquillo	63,239	4.29
Nacionalista	Mike Lina	56,377	
NPC	Virgilio Macasaet, Jr.	55,515	
NPC	Nonato Monfero	53,746	
Nacionalista	Aries Macala	53,413	
NPC	Raul Montealto	52,428	
NPC	Marcus Dominic Mendoza	50,996	
NPC	Emmanuel De Castro	50,882	
Nacionalista	Gerardo America	35,590	
Nacionalista	George Katigbak	35,526	
NPC	Reman Eric Recio	35,252	
NPC	Jonas Anciano	32,613	
NPC	Paolo Soriano	29,974	
Independent	Rodel Macasaet	17,307	
Independent	Florencio Fonte, Jr.	13,136	
Independent	Ramir Bathan	7,530	
Independent	Sonia Milan-Crisostomo	7,309	
Independent	Ireneo Aguilera	3,837	
Independent	Carlos Barde	3,242	
Total votes		1,472,508	100.00%
