= Quezon City Youth Development Council =

Youth policy-making body of Quezon City, Philippines

- 3rd Council
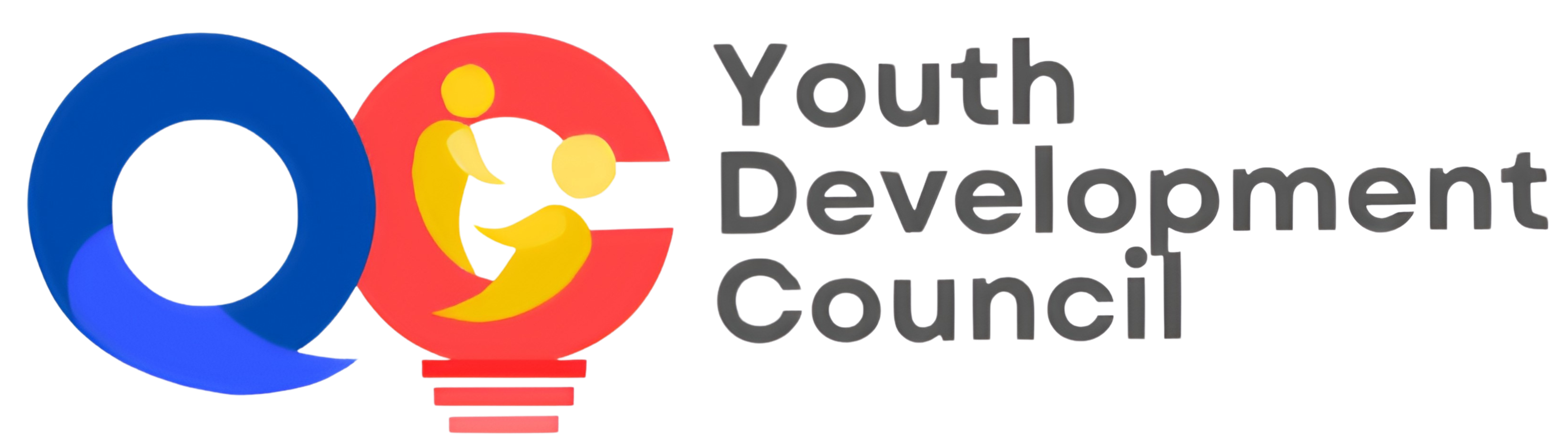

Type
- Type: Advisory and deliberative

History
- Founded: May 31, 2005; 21 years ago (thru Ordinance No. SP-1542)

Leadership
- Chairperson: Jhon Angelli "Sami" C. Neri, Sangguniang Kabataan Federation
- Vice Chairperson: Gabriel A. Peralta, Sangguniang Kabataan Federation
- Floor Leader: Rodel John "RJ" Q. Damian
- Deputy Floor Leaders: Ronald John L. Espiritu; Neilvin John P. Aventurado
- Assistant Floor Leaders: Carl Joseph S. Alcones; Nils Jian V. Ledesma
- Chairperson of the Executive Board: Joy Belmonte, Office of the City Mayor
- Head of the Secretariat: Dr. Eddilyn D.C. Dividina, Youth Development Office

Structure
- Seats: 21 (including 2 ex officio members from the Sangguniang Kabataan Federation)
- Length of term: 3 years
- Authority: Sangguniang Kabataan Reform Act of 2015

Elections
- Voting system: Indirect election
- Last election: September 2024
- Next election: September 2027

Meeting place
- Quezon City Hall

The Quezon City Youth Development Council (QCYDC) is the youth policymaking, planning, and coordinating body of Quezon City. It is led by the Sangguniang Kabataan Federation president and vice president and composed of nineteen elected representatives from different youth-led and youth-serving organizations throughout the city.

The council is responsible for finalizing, monitoring, and implementing the projects and programs in the city's three-year Local Youth Development Plan.

== History ==
=== Before Sangguniang Kabataan reform ===
The Quezon City Youth Development Council was established on May 31, 2005, pursuant to the city's Ordinance No. SP-1542, enacted by the Quezon City Council and approved by Mayor Feliciano Belmonte Jr. The council was initially composed of the mayor as the chairman, the Sangguniang Kabataan Federation president as vice chairman, city planning and development coordinator, city social welfare and development officer, president of youth organization federation created and accredited by the city government, and one representative each per church-based and community-based youth-serving organization.

The council was mandated to:

- Formulate policies and component program in coordination with the various government agencies handling youth-related programs, projects and activities;
- Coordinate and harmonize activities of all agencies and organizations in the city engaged in youth development programs;
- Develop and provide support for the development and coordination of youth projects and design strategies to gain support and participation of the youth;
- Assist national government and local government agencies in the promotion of programs, projects and activities in the local level;
- Assist various government and non-government agencies in the identification and nomination of qualified participants to different programs, projects and activities;
- Conduct fund raising and solicitation, receive donations and bequests, and enter into contracts with other government and non-government agencies necessary for the accomplishment of the council's objectives;
- Recommend youth programs and proposals to appropriate government agencies and non-government organizations;
- Accredit Training Pools for the project proposals to appropriate government agencies necessary agencies necessary for the accomplishment of the council's objectives;
- Solicit and receive donations from any individual, non- government agencies, both local and international;
- Create research team that will formulate a mechanism for Youth Situationer;
- Establish youth centers as deemed necessary;
- Monitor implementation programs and projects at all local level;
- Nominate its delegate to the National Youth Parliament; and
- Perform other functions as may be provided by the law.

=== After Sangguniang Kabataan reform ===
Kayo ang pioneer sa Metro Manila, kauna-unahan sa history under the SK Reform Law. Kayo rin ang magsisimula ng programang pang-kabataan dito sa Quezon City.

— Quezon City Mayor Herbert Bautista as he administered the oath of the first youth development council.

The concept of local youth development councils in city, municipal, and provincial levels was institutionalized by the Sangguniang Kabataan Reform Act of 2015 to assist the planning and execution of SK projects and programs.

Described as the "first local youth development council convened and activated in Metro Manila," the members of the first council took their oath of office on July 13, 2018, which was administered by Quezon City mayor Herbert Bautista.

On February 4, 2019, the Quezon City Youth Development Office was institutionalized in the local government through Ordinance SP-2803. The said ordinance mandated the QCYDO to facilitate the election of QCYDC sectoral representatives every three years and to serve as the council's secretariat.

The Quezon City Council enacted Ordinance No. SP-3162 on December 5, 2022, creating QCYDC's executive board to be composed of representatives from different local government offices. The ordinance was approved by Mayor Joy Belmonte on January 3 the following year.

== Composition ==
Mayor Joy Belmonte administered the oath of office of the 3rd Quezon City Youth Development Council on September 23, 2024.

3rd Council (2024–2027)
Position	Name	Committee	Organization	District
Chairperson	Jhon Angelli "Sami" C. Neri		Sangguniang Kabataan Federation	1st
Vice Chairperson	Gabriel A. Peralta		Sangguniang Kabataan Federation	2nd
Majority Floor Leader	Rodel John "RJ" Q. Damian	Peace Building and Security; Rules and Ethics	National Youth Volunteers' Coalition	2nd
Deputy Majority Floor Leader for Internal Affairs	Ronald John "Ron" L. Espiritu	Active Citizenship; Rules and Ethics	Sulong Kabataan Youth Organization - San Bartolome	5th
Deputy Majority Floor Leader for External Affairs	Neilvin John "Neil" P. Aventurado	Social Inclusion and Equity; Governance; Rules and Ethics	Socorro Youth for Church and Community Development	3rd
Assistant Majority Floor Leader for Internal Affairs	vacant	Rules and Ethics		
Assistant Majority Floor Leader for External Affairs	Carl Joseph S. Alcones	Active Citizenship; Rules and Ethics	Batasan Youth Leaders Coalition	2nd
Chairperson of the Committee on Public Information	Christian C. Bartina	Health; Public Information	Batang Del Monte Organization	1st
Members / Representatives	Joseph L. Prasas	Agriculture	Pinagsamang Lakas ng Kabataan (PILAK)	6th
Members / Representatives	John Ernie Odasco	Economic Empowerment	Barkadahan Youth Organization (BYO) of Barangay Del Monte, Inc.	1st
Members / Representatives	Eliza-Ann A. Hecto	Economic Empowerment	Payatas Blue Eagle Youth Organization	2nd
Members / Representatives	Renz Andrew C. Leocadio	Education	Tayo'y Alas ng Bayan Youth Movement	2nd
Members / Representatives	Joel Jay G. Esparza	Environment	Youth for Environmental Sustainability Organization - Barangay Commonwealth	2nd
Members / Representatives	Milanie P. Jurban	Environment	Saint Mary Youth Organization	2nd
Members / Representatives	Sarip R. Macasari	Global Mobility	Youth in Action of Villa Severa Town Homes	5th
Members / Representatives	Raizen C. Pascual	Health	Lupang Pangako Phase 3 - Block 2, 3, and 4 Youth Society	2nd
Members / Representatives	Jamil Allen G. Fortaleza	Health	MGT League of Youth Organization	5th
Members / Representatives	Johnsen B. Dela Peña	Peace Building and Security	Youth Society	4th
Members / Representatives	Gener B. Bitancur	Social Inclusion and Equity	Kabataang May Dedikasyon para sa Loyola Heights	3rd
Members / Representatives	Christine Joy F. Manalastas	Social Inclusion and Equity	Luzviminda Youth Organization	2nd
Secretariat	Dr. Eddilyn D.C. Dividina		Quezon City Youth Development Office	
