= León Guinto =

Filipino public servant

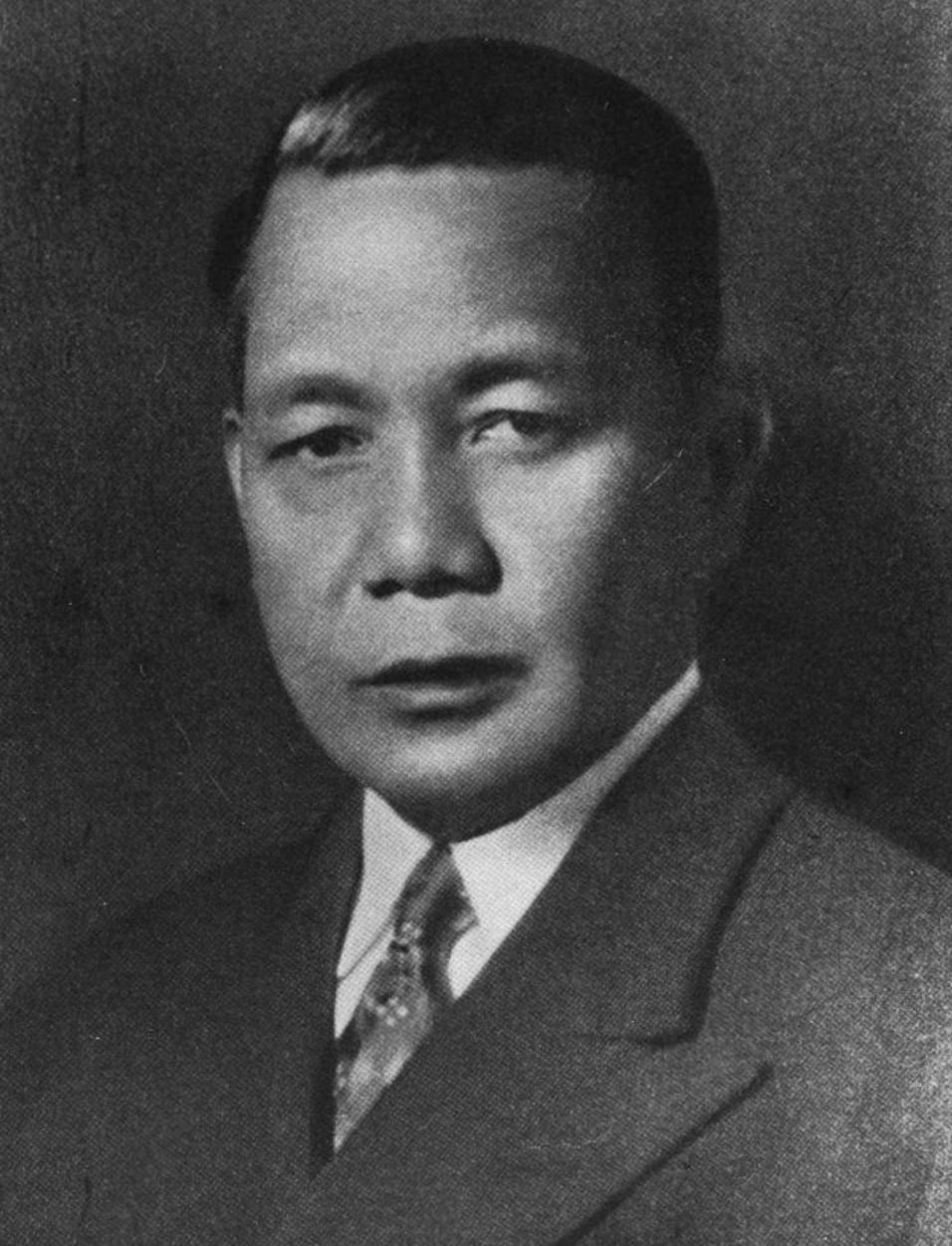
- Photograph from The Commercial & Industrial Manual of the Philippines, 1941

2nd Mayor of the City of Greater Manila (12th Mayor of Manila)
- In office January 27, 1942 – July 17, 1944
- Appointed by: Jorge B. Vargas
- Vice Mayor: Hermenegildo Atienza (as Vice Mayor for Manila)
- Preceded by: Jorge B. Vargas
- Succeeded by: Hermenegildo Atienza (as Mayor of Manila)

Member of the National Assembly from Manila
- Ex officio
- In office September 25, 1943 – February 2, 1944 Serving with Alfonso E. Mendoza

3rd Secretary of Labor
- In office 1940–1941
- President: Manuel L. Quezon
- Preceded by: Jose Avelino
- Succeeded by: Basilio Valdes

Member of the House of Representatives from Tayabas's 2nd district
- In office 1925–1928
- Preceded by: Rafael R. Vilar
- Succeeded by: Marcelo T. Boncan

11th & 19th Governor of Tayabas
- In office December 30, 1955 – December 30, 1959
- Preceded by: Vicente Constantino
- Succeeded by: Claro Robles
- In office 1928–1933
- Preceded by: Filemon Perez
- Succeeded by: Maximo Rodriguez

Member of the Tayabas Provincial Board
- In office 1922–1925

Personal details
- Born: León Gawaran Guinto; June 28, 1886 Bacoor, Cavite, Captaincy General of the Philippines
- Died: July 10, 1962 (aged 76) Manila, Philippines
- Resting place: Manila South Cemetery
- Party: Nacionalista (1922–1942; 1945–1962)
- Other political affiliations: KALIBAPI (1942–1945)
- Spouse: Marta Montes
- Children: 5
- Education: Colegio de San Juan de Letran
- Occupation: Politician

León Gawaran Guinto Sr. (June 28, 1886 – July 10, 1962) was a public servant in the Philippines from the Commonwealth period up to the post-war era, best remembered as the war-time Mayor of the City of Greater Manila in the Philippines.

== Early life ==
Guinto was born to Juan P. Guinto and Pia Gawaran in the village of San Nicolas in Bacoor, Cavite province. He completed his early education from his home town and earned his college degree from the Colegio de San Juan de Letran. He first got work at the Weather Bureau, married Marta Montes from Atimonan, Tayabas Province (now Quezon). The union produced three sons and two daughters.

By 1916, Guinto left his job at the Weather Bureau to pursue law studies at the old Escuela de Derecho and by 1920, after completing his law studies and qualifying as a bona fide lawyer, Guinto was employed as private secretary to the then Senate President, Manuel L. Quezon.

== Government service ==
=== Pre-World War II ===
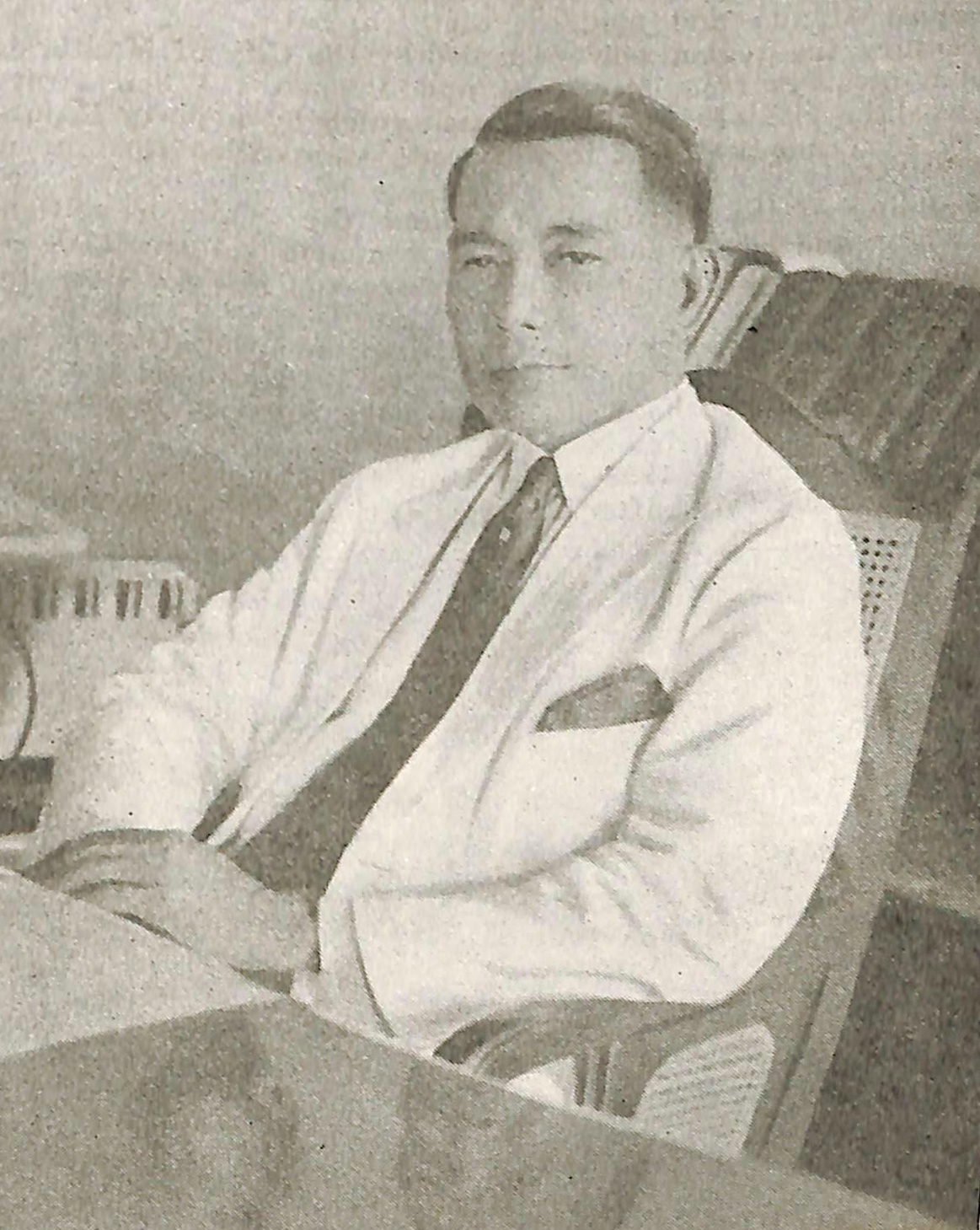
Guinto as Commissioner of Public Safety in 1939

Guinto, after serving briefly as private secretary to Senate President Manuel L. Quezon, launched his political career in 1922 by running as member of the Provincial Board of Tayabas Province, the home province of his wife Marta Montes.

By 1925, he pursued the position of representative of the 2nd district of Tayabas under the Lower House of the Philippine Legislature. He held the post of legislator for six years until 1928.

He was elected provincial governor of Tayabas in 1928 but his term was cut short when he was appointed as Commissioner of Public Safety by then American Governor-General Theodore Roosevelt Jr. In the later part of 1933, Governor-General Frank Murphy named undersecretary of the Interior Department. By 1934, the Departments of Interior and Labor were merged and Guinto continued to serve as undersecretary.

In 1940, Guinto was appointed Secretary of Labor in the Commonwealth government of President Manuel L. Quezon.

=== Greater Manila's war-time mayor ===
By 1942, Guinto was appointed by Jorge B. Vargas, the then incoming chairman of the Japanese-created government structure called the Philippine Executive Commission, to assume the position of mayor of City of Greater Manila and look after the city's administration during the Japanese occupation during World War II. Guinto's close relations with the labor sector proved useful to his administration of Greater Manila, of which a number of labor leaders served as heads of the city government departments. He held the position until 1944, a year before the city was officially disestablished.

In 1945, Guinto was indicted as a war criminal for collaborating with the Japanese forces. A blanket amnesty was issued before the granting of Philippine Independence on July 4, 1946, sparing the former Manila mayor of a war crimes trial.

=== Post-World War II ===
Guinto went into the private sector, taught in the academe and even served as Dean of the College of Arts and Sciences of the Lyceum of the Philippines University.

In 1955, Guinto returned home to Quezon Province and was elected governor, only to lose re-election in 1959.

== Death ==
Guinto died in 1962 at the age of 76 in Manila, Philippines.

== Legacy ==
Pennsylvania Street, which runs through the Ermita and Malate districts in Manila, was renamed in his honor and memory.

House of Representatives of the Philippines
Preceded by Rafael Villar	Member of the House of Representatives from Tayabas's 2nd district 1925–1928	Succeeded by Marcelo Boncan
Political offices
Preceded by Filemon Perez	Governor of Tayabas; 1928–1933	Succeeded by Maximo Rodriguez
Preceded by Jorge B. Vargas	Mayor of the City of Greater Manila; 1942–1944	Position abolished
Preceded by Jorge B. Vargas	Mayor of the City of Greater Manila; 1942–1944	Succeeded by Hermenegildo Atienza as Mayor of Manila
Preceded by Vicente Constantino	Governor of Quezon; 1955–1959	Succeeded by Claro Robles
Government offices
Preceded by Sotero Baluyut	Secretary of Labor; 1940–1941	Succeeded by Basilio Valdes as Secretary of National Defense, Public Works, Communications and Labor
