= Jorge B. Vargas =

Filipino lawyer, diplomat and youth advocate

The Honorable Jorge B. Vargas
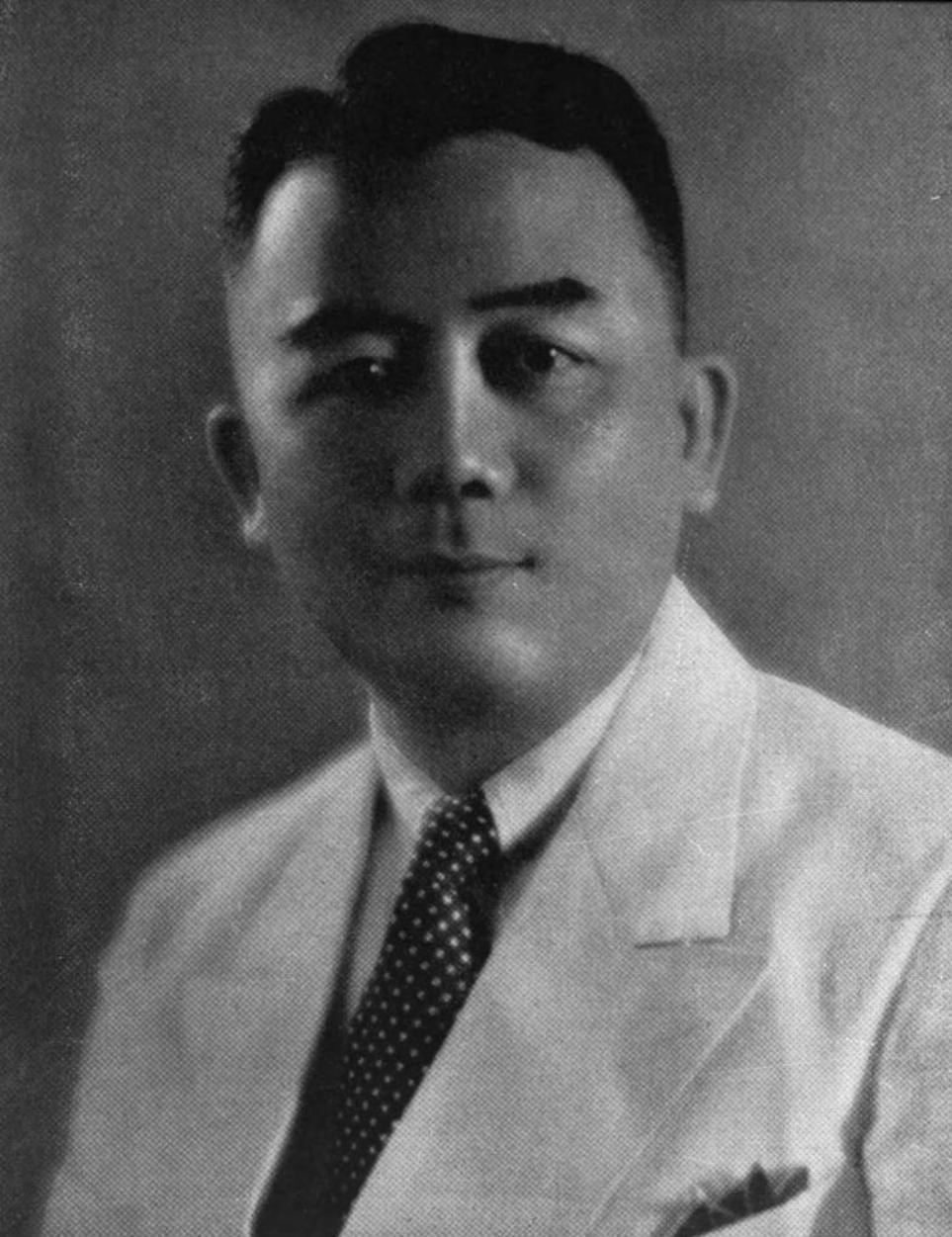
- Photograph from The Commercial & Industrial Manual of the Philippines, 1941

Presiding Officer of the Philippine Executive Commission
- In office January 23, 1942 – October 14, 1943
- Governor-General: Masaharu Homma; Shizuichi Tanaka; Shigenori Kuroda
- Preceded by: Himself; As Head of the Civilian Emergency Administration
- Succeeded by: José P. Laurel (as President)

Head of the Civilian Emergency Administration In concurrent capacity with the mayoralty of Manila
- In office December 22, 1941 – January 23, 1942
- Appointed by: Manuel L. Quezon
- Succeeded by: Himself; As Presiding Officer of the Philippine Executive Commission

1st Mayor of the City of Greater Manila (11th Mayor of Manila)
- In office December 24, 1941 – January 26, 1942
- Appointed by: Manuel L. Quezon
- Deputy: List: Hermenegildo Atienza (as Vice Mayor of Manila); Cornelio Cordero (as Assistant Mayor for Caloocan); José Villena (as Assistant Mayor for Makati); Pedro Cruz (as Assistant Mayor for Mandaluyong); Moises San Juan (as Assistant Mayor for Pasay); Daniel Santiago (as Assistant Mayor for San Juan)
- Preceded by: Position established (City of Greater Manila); Juan Nolasco (as Mayor of Manila)
- Succeeded by: León Guinto

Secretary of National Defense
- In office December 11, 1941 – December 22, 1941
- Appointed by: Manuel L. Quezon
- Preceded by: Manuel L. Quezon in concurrent capacity as President
- Succeeded by: Basilio Valdez

1st Executive Secretary of the Philippines
- In office January 30, 1936 – December 11, 1941
- Appointed by: Manuel L. Quezon
- Preceded by: Post created
- Succeeded by: Manuel Roxas

10th Vice Mayor of Manila
- In office January 1, 1932 – January 4, 1940
- Appointed by: Manuel L. Quezon
- Mayor: Tomas Earnshaw (1932–1933); Juan Posadas Jr. (1934–1940)
- Preceded by: Isabelo de los Reyes
- Succeeded by: Carmen Planas

Director General of the Philippine Carnival Association
- In office 1921–1922
- Preceded by: Vicente Morente
- Succeeded by: Arsenio Luz

Personal details
- Born: Jorge Bartolomé Vargas y Celis; August 24, 1890 Bago, Negros Occidental, Captaincy General of the Philippines, Spanish East Indies
- Died: February 22, 1980 (aged 89) Manila, Philippines
- Resting place: Manila Memorial Park – Sucat, Paranaque, Philippines
- Party: Nacionalista (1932–1942; 1945–1980)
- Other political affiliations: KALIBAPI (1942–1945)
- Spouse(s): Marina Yulo; Adelaida Montilla Peña
- Children: 8
- Parent(s): Ángel Tiongco Vargas (father); Filomena Trinidad Celis (mother)
- Relatives: Ricky Vargas (grandson)
- Education: University of the Philippines Diliman (BA, LL.B)

Jorge Bartolomé Vargas y Celis (August 24, 1890 – February 22, 1980) was a Filipino lawyer, diplomat and youth advocate born in Bago, Negros Occidental, Philippines. He graduated valedictorian from Negros Occidental High School in 1909 and obtained a Bachelor of Arts degree in 1911 and a Bachelor of Law degree with honors in 1914, both from the University of the Philippines. He was a founding member of the Philippine Amateur Athletic Federation (now the Philippine Olympic Committee) in 1911 and served in its executive committee in 1918. He served as its second chairman from 1935 to 1955. He was also the first Filipino member of the International Olympic Committee.

== Early life and education ==
Vargas was born on August 24, 1890, in Bago, Negros Occidental, Philippines. He graduated valedictorian from Negros Occidental High School in 1909 and obtained a Bachelor of Arts degree in 1911 and a Bachelor of Law degree with honors in 1914, both from the University of the Philippines.

== Career and founder ==
He was a founding member of the Philippine Amateur Athletic Federation (now the Philippine Olympic Committee) in 1911 and served in its executive committee in 1918. He served as its second chairman from 1935 to 1955. He was also the first Filipino member of the International Olympic Committee.

As a member of the IOC, he proposed in 1960 that the disagreement about how to name the Republic of China's National Olympic Committee should be resolved by using the name Chinese Taipei for the ROC's committee.

== Government service ==
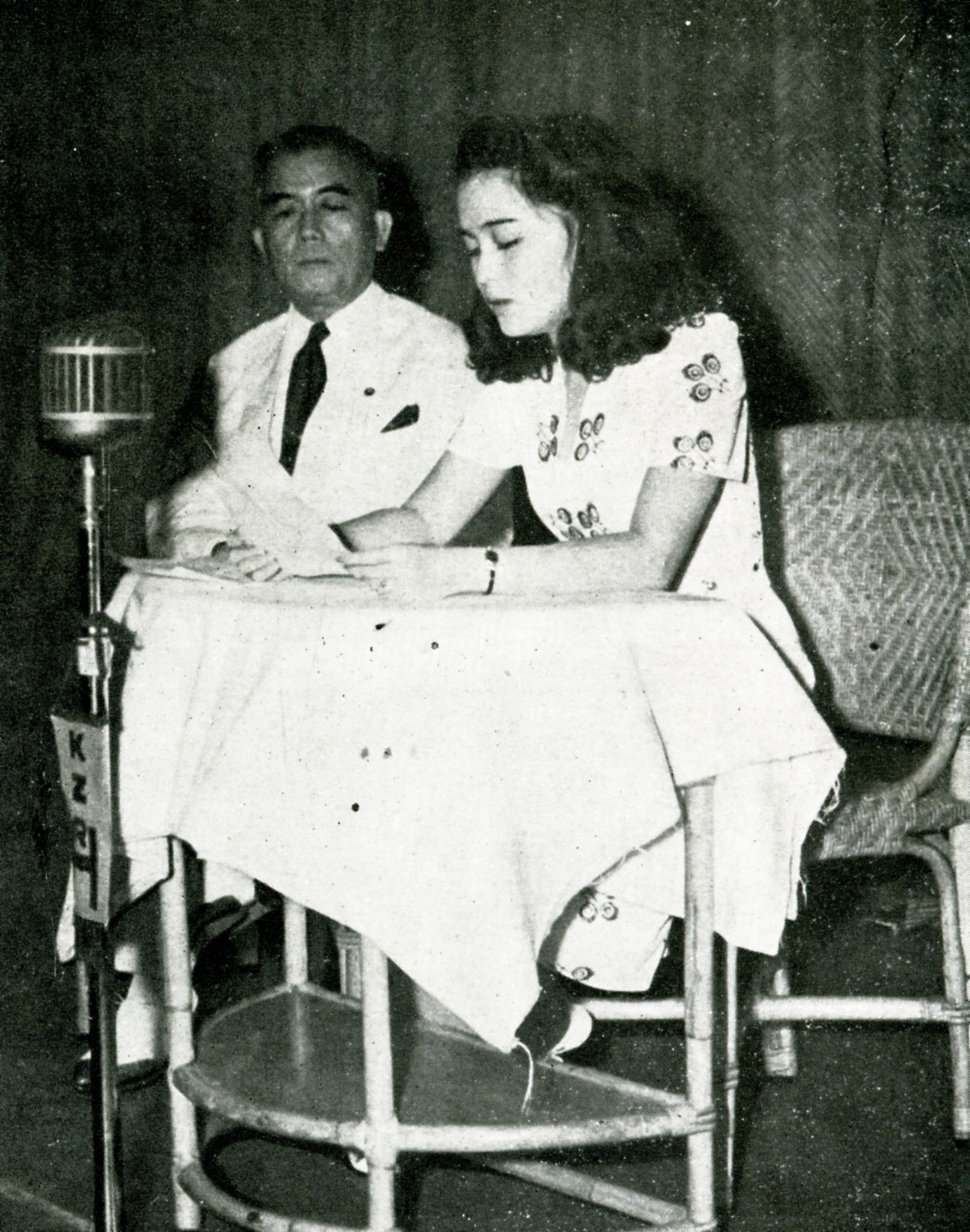
Vargas and his daughter, 1943

After being admitted to the Philippine Bar in 1914, he was appointed as a law clerk for the Philippine Commission in 1915. He was promoted to the position of chief clerk of the Department of the Interior in 1917.

In 1918, he served as the legislative secretary to Speaker Sergio Osmeña of the House of Representatives.

In 1921, Vargas succeeded Vicente Morente as director-general of the Philippine Carnival Association which ran the Manila Carnival. He was succeeded by Arsenio Luz the following year.

In 1936, Vargas was appointed by President Manuel L. Quezon as his executive secretary, becoming the first in the country to serve in such a position.

When the Japanese invaded the country in 1941, Vargas was designated to the Department of National Defense as its secretary. A few weeks later, he was appointed by President Quezon as mayor of the City of Greater Manila in 1941. His responsibilities included administering the open city upon the arrival of occupational troops of the Imperial Japanese Army on January 2, 1942.

By 1942, Vargas became chairman of the Japanese-sponsored Philippine Executive Commission. During the collaborationist Second Philippine Republic, he was once asked by the Japanese to assume the Presidency, but he declined. He instead served as the regime's ambassador to Japan. In that position, he was quoted shortly before Japanese troops were driven from Manila as stating that "we know Japan is destined for sure victory and prosperity for ages to come."

Vargas served as chairman of the National Planning Commission from 1946 to 1954 and was a member of the Board of Regents of the University of the Philippines from 1961 to 1965. In 1960, the Philippines conferred on him the Legion of Honor with the rank of commander.

== Scouting ==
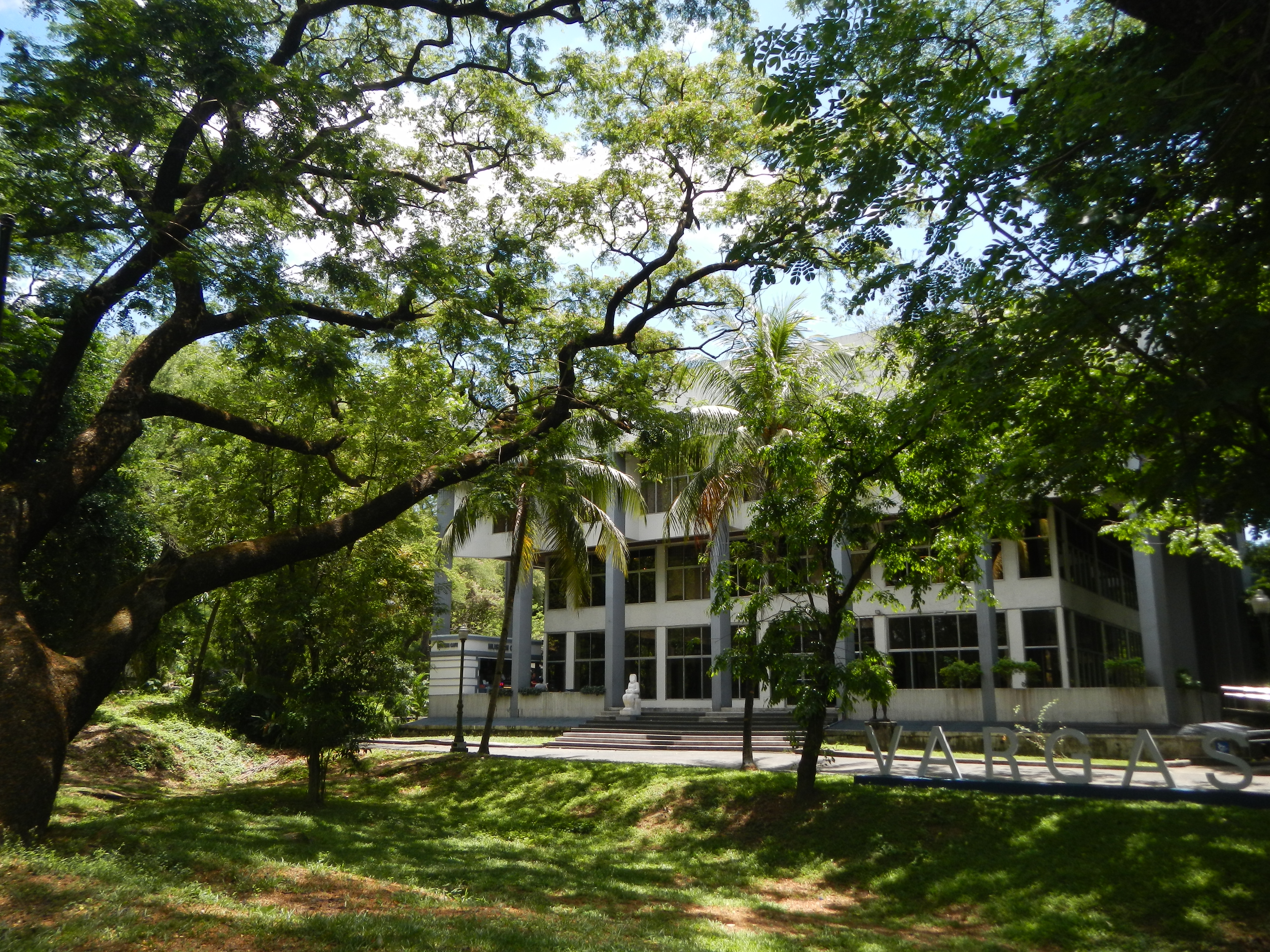
Jorge B. Vargas Museum and Filipiniana Research Center (UP Diliman)

Vargas involvement with scouting started in 1935 when he became a member of the executive board of the Philippine Council of the Boy Scouts of America. Together with other Philippine scouting advocates, he became one of the charter members of the Boy Scouts of the Philippines in 1936.

Upon the death of Manuel Camus in 1949, Vargas was unanimously chosen by the National Executive Board to serve as the president and chief scout of the Boy Scouts of the Philippines. He served the position of national president until 1961. He became a member of the World Scout Committee of the World Organization of the Scout Movement from 1951 to 1957.

Vargas was awarded the Bronze Wolf in 1959 and received other awards including the Silver Tamaraw (Philippines), Silver Fox (Canada), Silver Ibex (Austria), Silver Wolf (UK), and in 1959 also received the highest distinction of the Scout Association of Japan, the Golden Pheasant Award. He also became the first recipient of the Tanglaw ng Kabataan (Light of the Youth) Award of the BSP in 1961.

== Death ==
Vargas died on February 22, 1980, in Manila, Philippines at the age of 89.

== Honours ==
- Japan: Grand Cordon (1st Class) of the Order of the Rising Sun (October 1, 1943)

== Gallery ==
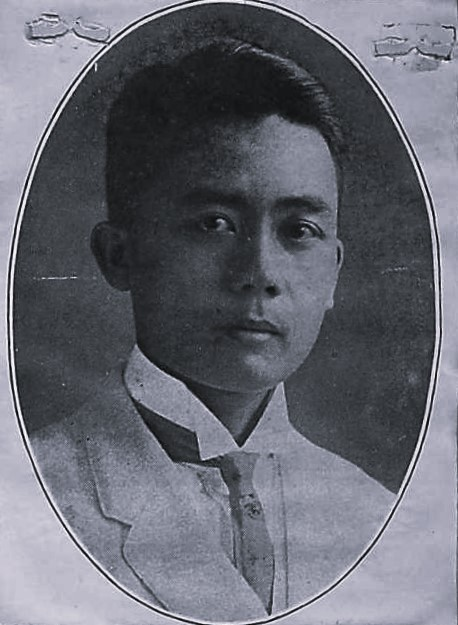
Vargas in 1915

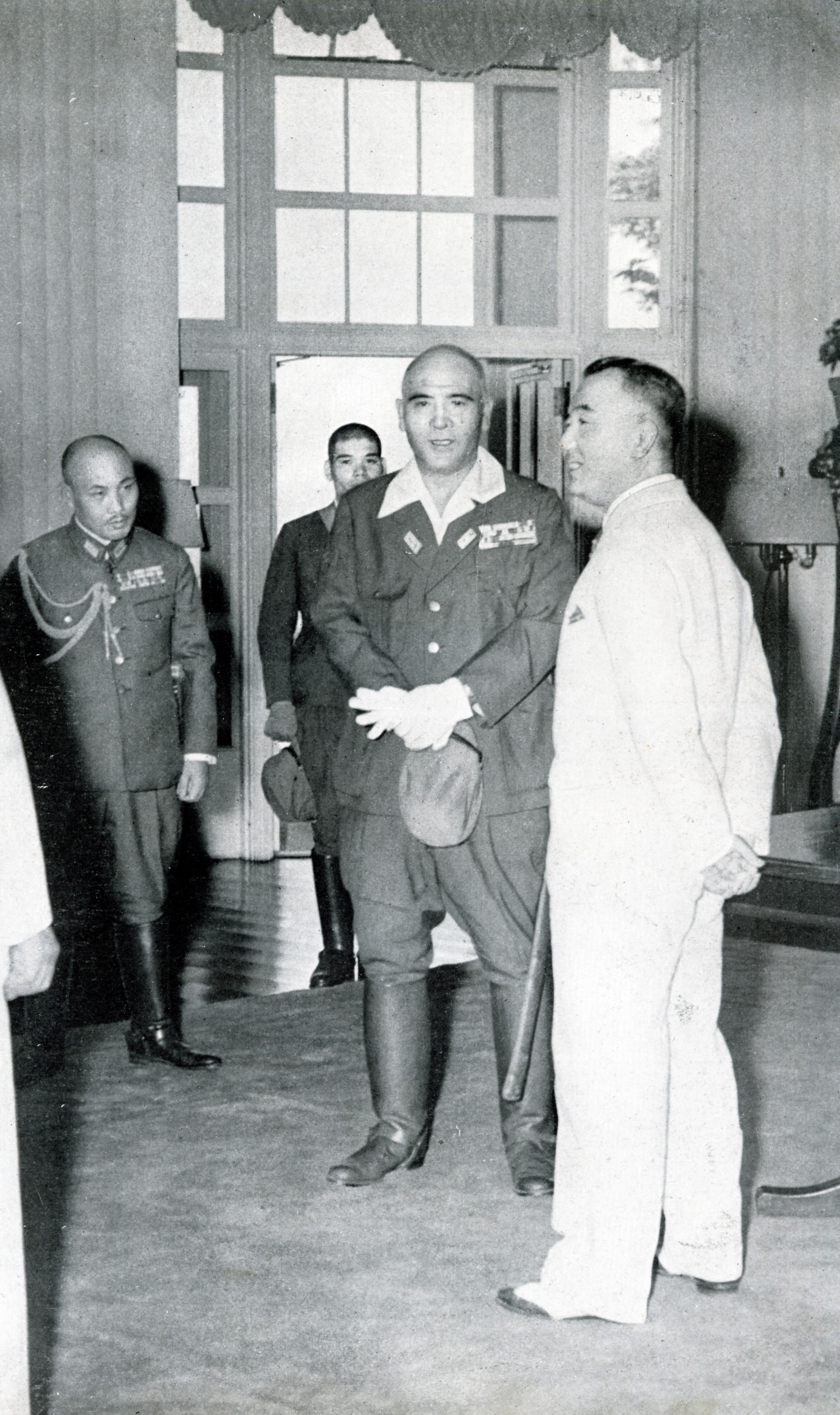
Vargas ''(in white)'' with Japanese General Homma, 1943

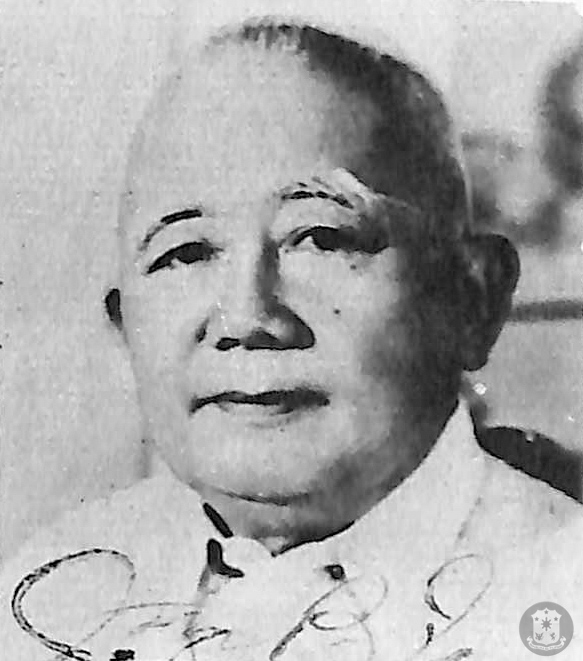
Vargas in 1978

== See also ==
- Jorge B. Vargas Museum and Filipiniana Research Center

Government offices
Preceded by Vicente Morente	Director-General of the Philippine Carnival Association; 1921–1922	Succeeded by Arsenio Luz
Political offices
Preceded by Isabelo de los Reyes	Vice Mayor of Manila; 1932–1940	Succeeded by Carmen Planas
New office	Executive Secretary; 1936–1941	Succeeded by Manuel Roxas
Preceded by Manuel L. Quezon	Secretary of National Defense; 1941	Succeeded by Basilio Valdez
New office	Mayor of the City of Greater Manila; 1941–1942	Succeeded by León Guinto
Preceded by Juan Nolasco as Mayor of Manila	Mayor of the City of Greater Manila; 1941–1942	Succeeded by León Guinto
Preceded by Masaharu Homma as Japanese Military Administration	Presiding Officer of the Philippine Executive Commission (de facto Head of Government); 1942–1943	Succeeded by Jose P. Laurel as President of the Philippines
