= Juan Nolasco =

Filipino doctor and politician

The Honourable Juan G. Nolasco
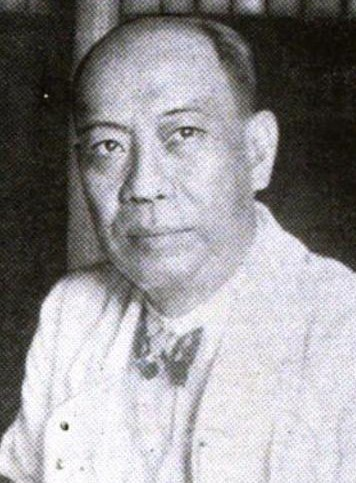
- Senatorial portrait of Nolasco, published by Benipayo Press, c. 1935

10th and 14th Mayor of Manila
- In office July 19, 1945 – June 6, 1946
- Vice Mayor: Carmen Planas
- Preceded by: Hermenegildo Atienza
- Succeeded by: Valeriano E. Fugoso, Sr.
- In office August 29, 1941 – December 23, 1941
- Appointed by: Manuel L. Quezon
- Vice Mayor: Hermenegildo Atienza
- Preceded by: Eulogio Rodriguez
- Succeeded by: Jorge B. Vargas

Senator of the Philippines from the 4th District
- In office June 2, 1931 – September 16, 1935
- Preceded by: Juan Sumulong
- Succeeded by: Office abolished

1st Secretary of Public Instruction, Health, and Public Welfare
- In office November 15, 1935 – December 24, 1941
- President: Manuel L. Quezon
- Preceded by: Position established Jose Fabella (as Commissioner of Public Welfare)
- Succeeded by: Sergio Osmeña

Member of the House of Representatives from Manila's 1st district
- In office July 21, 1919 – October 27, 1922
- Preceded by: Antonio Montenegro
- Succeeded by: Gregorio Perfecto

Member of the Manila City Council
- In office 1916–1919

Personal details
- Born: March 8, 1885 Tondo, Manila, Captaincy General of the Philippines
- Died: September 18, 1960 (aged 75) Manila, Philippines
- Party: Nacionalista
- Education: Ateneo de Manila (BA); University of Santo Tomas (LMS)

Juan Gomez Nolasco (March 8, 1885 – September 18, 1960) was a Filipino doctor and politician who served as the 10th and 14th Mayor of Manila from August to December 1941 again on 1945 to 1946, he also served as a Senator of the Philippines from the 4th District from 1931 to 1935.

== Early life and career ==
Nolasco was born on March 8, 1885, in Tondo, Manila to Ceferino Nolasco and Severa Gomez. He received his Bachelor of Arts degree from the Ateneo de Manila and his Licentiate in Medicine and Surgery from the University of Santo Tomas. He worked as a consulting physician of the Mary Johnston Hospital before entering politics.

== Political career ==
Nolasco first joined politics as a member of the Manila City Council from 1916 to 1919. He was then elected to the House of Representatives to represent the 1st district of Manila from 1919 to 1922. In 1931, he was elected to the Philippine Senate to represent the 4th District, and served until the abolition of the body in 1935. In August 1941, he was appointed by President Manuel L. Quezon as Mayor of Manila and served in that position until December, shortly after the beginning of the Japanese invasion.

== Legacy ==
A high school and a street in Tondo is named after him.
