= Hotshots (1984 film) =

1986 Filipino film

- Directed by: Jeric Soriano
- Screenplay by: Jose Javier Reyes
- Story by: Jose Javier Reyes
- Produced by: Ramon Salvador
- Starring: Herbert Bautista; Aga Muhlach; Raymond Lauchengco; Gary Valenciano; Eula Valdez; Jobelle Salvador; Monette Rivera
- Cinematography: Conrado Baltazar; Rody Lacap
- Edited by: George Jarlego; Max Jocson
- Music by: Max Jocson
- Production company: Viva Films
- Distributed by: Viva Films
- Release date: August 9, 1984
- Running time: 109 minutes
- Country: Philippines
- Languages: Filipino; English

Hotshots is a 1984 Filipino youth-oriented musical film directed by Jeric Soriano on his directorial debut. The film stars Gary Valenciano on his theatrical debut, Herbert Bautista, Aga Muhlach, Raymond Lauchengco, Eula Valdez, Jobelle Salvador and Monette Rivera.

== Cast ==
- Herbert Bautista as Boy
- Raymond Lauchengco as Danny
- Aga Muhlach as Archie
- Gary Valenciano as Mike
- Jobelle Salvador as Susan
- Eula Valdez as Elaine
- Monette Rivera as Alice
- Debraliz Valasote as Cynthia
- Paquito Salcedo as Lolo
- Naty Mallares as Lola
- Hector Reyes as Danny's Father
- Zorayda Sanchez as Ms. Armacost
- Ginny Lim as Cherry
- Carme Sanchez as Fat Lady
- Jose Antonio Barrios as Julius
- Jose Maria Barrios as Caesar
- Chesley Masias as Brutus
- Jay Garcia Ariño as Anne Marie
- Mary Joy Mañego as Nini
- Claudette Khan as Gigi
- Carolyn Calo as Cindy
- Rene Diaz as Little
- Josie Shoemaker as Alice's Maid
- Edna Vida Reyes as Ballet Instructor
- Nena Marquez as Alice's Mother
- Crispina dela Cruz as Debutante

== Soundtrack ==
Hotshots

Soundtrack album by Various artists
- Released: 1984
- Recorded: 1984
- Genre: Dance pop
- Label: Sunshine Records
- Producer: Spanky Rigor

Accompanying the movie is its soundtrack, released in 1984 on Vicor Music subsidiary Sunshine Records.

Side A
No.	Title	Writer(s)	Performer	Length
1.	"Theme From Hotshots"	Eddie Formoso	Gary Valenciano
2.	"Just Gotta Do It"	Tats Faustino	Gary Valenciano
3.	"Shadow Of Time"	Louie Ocampo, Jim Millbower	Raymond Lauchengco
4.	"Kalybration"	Homer Flores	Musix
5.	"Reachin' Out"	Cecile Azarcon-Picazo	Gary Valenciano
6.	"Who Can It Be Now?"	Colin Hay	Gang War

Side B
No.	Title	Writer(s)	Performer	Length
7.	"Dance"	Eddie Formoso	Musix
8.	"Ocean Deep"	Rod Trott, Jon Sweet, Cliff Richard	Don Bailey
9.	"Footloose"	Kenny Loggins, Dean Pitchford	Matt Klein
10.	"The Reflex"	Duran Duran	Smoking Gun
11.	"Special Memory"	Cecile Azarcon-Picazo	Iwi Laurel
12.	"Theme From Hotshots (Instrumental)"	Eddie Formoso
