= Mel Mathay =

Filipino lawyer and politician (1932–2013)

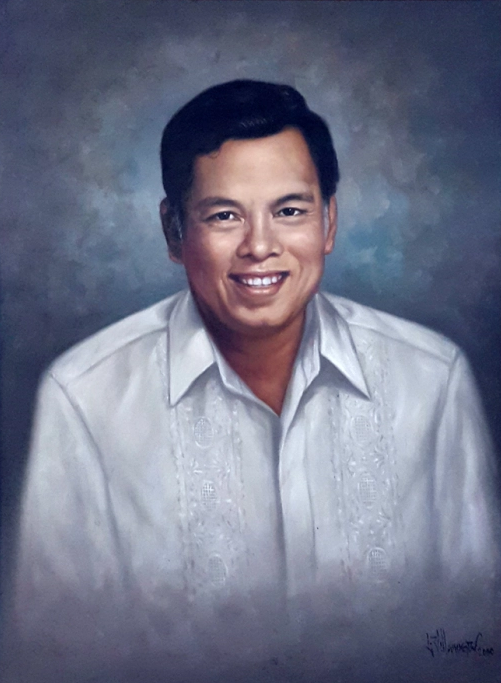
- Painted by Luisito Villanueva, c. 2000

9th Mayor of Quezon City
- In office June 30, 1992 – June 30, 2001
- Vice Mayor: Charito Planas (1992–1995); Herbert Bautista (1995–1998); Jorge L. Banal (1998); Fe Consuelo S. Angeles (1998–2001)
- Preceded by: Brigido R. Simon Jr.
- Succeeded by: Feliciano Belmonte, Jr.

Chairman of the Metropolitan Manila Authority
- In office June 30, 1992 – June 30, 1994
- President: Fidel V. Ramos
- Preceded by: Ignacio Bunye
- Succeeded by: Prospero Oreta

Member of the Philippine House of Representatives from Quezon City's 4th congressional district
- In office June 30, 1987 – June 30, 1992
- Preceded by: Position created
- Succeeded by: Feliciano Belmonte, Jr.

Mambabatas Pambansa (Assemblyman) from Quezon City
- In office June 30, 1984 – March 25, 1986 Serving with Orlando S. Mercado, Cecilia Muñoz-Palma and Alberto Romulo

Vice Governor of the Metro Manila Commission
- In office 1979–1986
- Appointed by: Imelda Marcos
- Governor: Imelda Marcos
- Preceded by: Position created
- Succeeded by: Position abolished

8th Vice Mayor of Quezon City
- In office January 1, 1968 – December 30, 1971
- Mayor: Norberto S. Amoranto
- Preceded by: Mariano Sta. Romana
- Succeeded by: Carlos Albert

Personal details
- Born: Ismael Austria Mathay Jr. June 26, 1932 Manila, Philippine Islands
- Died: December 25, 2013 (aged 81) Pasig, Philippines
- Resting place: Christ the King Parish - Greenmeadows, Quezon City
- Party: Independent (1992–1998; 1998–2004; 2005–2013)
- Other political affiliations: KBL (1984–1992); Lakas–NUCD (1998); LDP (2004)
- Spouses: Sonia Gandionco (m. 1953; died 2012); Vilma Valera (m. 2013)
- Relations: Ara Mina (granddaughter); Cris Mathay (grandson)
- Children: 4
- Parent: Ismael Mathay Sr. (father)
- Education: University of the Philippines Diliman (BS); San Beda College (LL.B)
- Occupation: Politician
- Profession: Lawyer

Ismael "Mel" Austria Mathay Jr. (June 26, 1932 – December 25, 2013) was a Filipino lawyer and politician who last served as the Mayor of Quezon City from 1992 to 2001. Previously, he had also served as vice mayor of Quezon City from 1968 to 1971, secretary to the commissioner of the General Authority Office from 1972 to 1981, vice governor of the Metro Manila Commission from 1979 to 1986, an assemblyman representing Quezon City in the Regular Batasang Pambansa from 1984 to 1986, representative for the city's 4th district from 1987 to 1992, director of the Metropolitan Waterworks and Sewerage System from 1979 to 1987, and chairman of the Metro Manila Authority (now Metropolitan Manila Development Authority) from 1993 to 1994.

== Early life and education ==
Ismael Austria Mathay Jr. was born in Manila on June 26, 1932, to Ismael Mathay Sr. and Josefina Mathay. Mathay Sr. was an auditor who would served as a cabinet member under Presidents Sergio Osmeña, Diosdado Macapagal, and Ferdinand Marcos.

Mathay graduated in 1953 with bachelor's degree in Business Administration Major in Economics in the University of the Philippines, where he joined the prestigious Upsilon Sigma Phi. Soon after graduation, he enrolled at the College of Law in San Beda College and successfully passed the bar examination in 1957.

== Political career ==
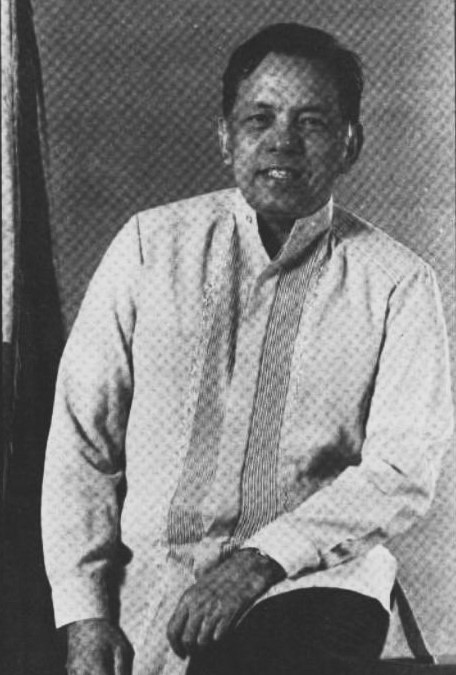
Mathay official portrait during the 8th Congress.

Mathay was elected Vice Mayor of Quezon City in 1967, serving from 1968 to 1971. In 1972, he was appointed secretary to the commissioner of the watchdog General Authority Office, a genuine recognition for his talent and integrity. Mathay had completed tenure of 9 years.

Prior to his becoming city mayor, he served as the vice governor of the Metro Manila Commission from 1979 to 1986, an assemblyman representing Quezon City in the Regular Batasang Pambansa from 1984 to 1986, and congressman representing Quezon City's 4th district from 1987 to 1992. He was director of the Metropolitan Waterworks and Sewerage System from 1979 to 1987, and chairman of the Metro Manila Authority from 1993 to 1994. He tried to reclaim the mayoral position in 2004 and 2010 but lost to Feliciano Belmonte Jr. and Herbert Bautista, respectively.

== Personal life ==
Mathay married his long-time partner Vilma Valera early in 2013, one year after the death of his first wife Sonya Gandionco. Actress Ara Mina and San Juan City councilors Cris and Ismael "Macky" Mathay IV are his grandchildren through his son Ismael "Chuck" Mathay III.

== Death ==
Mathay died of a heart attack at the age of 81 on December 25, 2013, at The Medical City Ortigas in Pasig. His remains were cremated on December 28 and later inurned at Christ the King Parish - Greenmeadows in Quezon City.

== In popular culture ==
He was portrayed by Marlon Mance and Billy Jake Cortez as the young Mel Mathay in the 2023 film Martyr or Murderer.

House of Representatives of the Philippines
New district	Representative, 4th District of Quezon City; 1987 – 1992	Succeeded by Feliciano Belmonte Jr.
Political offices
Preceded by Mariano Sta. Romana	Vice Mayor of Quezon City; 1968 – 1971	Succeeded by Carlos Albert
New office	Vice Governor of Metro Manila Commission; 1979 – 1986	Position abolished
Preceded by Brigido Simon Jr.	Mayor of Quezon City; 1992 – 2001	Succeeded by Feliciano Belmonte Jr.
Preceded by Ignacio Bunye	Chairperson of the Metropolitan Manila Authority; 1992 – 1994	Succeeded by Prospero Oreta as Chairperson of the Metropolitan Manila Development Authority
