= Hermenegildo Atienza =

Filipino lawyer and politician

The Honorable Hermenegildo Atienza
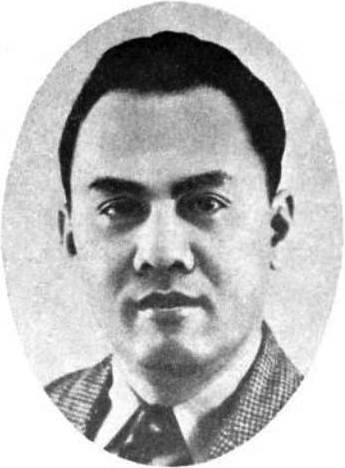
- Atienza official portrait during the 2nd Congress.

Member of the Philippine House of Representatives from Manila
- In office December 30, 1949 – February 9, 1952
- Succeeded by: Gavino Viola Fernando
- Constituency: 4th district
- In office May 25, 1946 – December 30, 1949
- Preceded by: Alfonso Mendoza
- Succeeded by: Arsenio Lacson
- Constituency: 2nd district

13th Mayor of Manila
- In office July 18, 1944 – July 18, 1945
- Vice Mayor: Carmen Planas
- Preceded by: Leon Guinto
- Succeeded by: Juan Nolasco

12th Vice Mayor of Manila
- In office August 29, 1941 – July 17, 1944
- Mayor: Juan Nolasco (1941); Jorge B. Vargas (1941–1942); Leon Guinto (1942–1944)
- Preceded by: Carmen Planas
- Succeeded by: Carmen Planas

Member of the Manila Municipal Board
- In office January 1, 1934 – January 4, 1940

Personal details
- Born: Anselmo Hermenegildo Joaquin Atienza; April 21, 1907 Malate, Manila, Philippine Islands
- Died: December 20, 1990 (aged 83) Manila, Philippines
- Resting place: Manila Memorial Park – Sucat, Parañaque, Philippines
- Party: Liberal (1946–1990)
- Other political affiliations: Nacionalista (1934–1942; 1945–1946); KALIBAPI (1942–1945)
- Relatives: Rigoberto Atienza (brother); Lito Atienza (nephew)
- Education: University of the Philippines

Anselmo Hermenegildo Joaquin Atienza (April 21, 1907 – December 20, 1990) was a Filipino lawyer and politician. He served as 13th Mayor of Manila (1944–1945) and as a member of the Philippine House of Representatives (1946–1952). His term as mayor coincided with the Liberation of Manila. He was previously the Vice Mayor of Manila (1940–1944) and a member of the Manila Municipal Board (1934–1940).

== Career ==
Atienza topped the Philippine Bar Examination in 1932 as a student at the University of the Philippines. During World War II, he was imprisoned by the Japanese in Fort Santiago, alongside guerilla leader Guillermo Nakar. After the war, he was elected to the 1st Congress of the Philippines for Manila's second district. He became a strong opponent of the amnesty granted to collaborationists with the Japanese occupation. In 1949, he introduced House Bill No. 2613, the Reciprocity Immigration Bill, which would have barred Australians from the country in response to the treatment of Lorenzo Gamboa under the White Australia policy. He was re-elected in the same year, this time representing the newly-established 4th district of Manila. However, he was unseated in 1952 upon the annulment of his election due to an electoral protest.

== Personal life ==
His nephew Lito Atienza also became Mayor of Manila.

== Legacy ==
An elementary school of the Division of City Schools - Manila (under DepEd) located in Baseco Compound, Port Area, Manila was named after him.

Political offices
Preceded by Carmen Planas	Vice Mayor of Manila; 1940–1944	Succeeded by Carmen Planas
Preceded by Leon Guinto	Mayor of Manila; 1944–1945	Succeeded by Juan Nolasco
House of Representatives of the Philippines
Preceded by Alfonso Mendoza	Member of the House of Representatives from Manila's 2nd district 1946–1949	Succeeded by Arsenio Lacson
New district	Member of the House of Representatives from Manila's 4th district 1949–1952	Succeeded by Gavino Viola Fernando
