= Mayor of Manila =

Local chief executive of Manila, Philippines

- Punong Lungsod ng Maynila
- Seal of the City of Manila

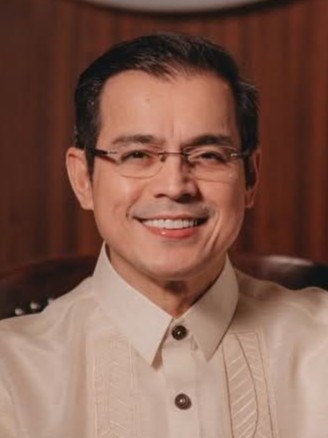
- Incumbent; Francisco "Isko Moreno" Domagoso since June 30, 2025
- Style: The Honorable (Formal)
- Seat: Manila City Hall, Ermita
- Appointer: Elected via popular vote
- Term length: 3 years, not eligible for re-election immediately after three consecutive terms
- Inaugural holder: Arsenio Cruz Herrera
- Formation: 1901
- Website: Lungsod ng Maynila

The City Mayor of Manila (Filipino: Punong Lungsod ng Maynila, sometimes referred to as Alkalde ng Maynila) is the head of the executive branch of Manila's city government. The mayor holds office at Manila City Hall. Like all local government heads in the Philippines, the mayor is elected via popular vote, and may not be elected for a fourth consecutive term (although the former mayor may return to office after an interval of one term). In case of death, resignation or incapacity, the vice mayor becomes the mayor.

== History ==
Prior to the arrival of Miguel López de Legazpi, Manila was a chiefdom headed by datus. From the defeat of Rajah Sulayman's forces in 1575 to the passage of the Maura Law in 1895, the chief executive of the city was appointed by the Spanish government to a person of Spanish descent. The highest position a Filipino was able to hold was the cabeza de barangay. With the passage of the Maura Law, the office of capitan municipal was established, with the people electing their own town heads, although the Spanish retained considerable influence and could veto decisions.

With the eruption of the Philippine Revolution and the Philippine–American War, the position reverted to an appointive head. With the advent of World War II, President Manuel L. Quezon appointed Jorge B. Vargas as mayor of the City of Greater Manila (forerunner of Metro Manila) in 1941. With the liberation of Manila in 1945 by combined Filipino and American soldiers under the United States Army and the Philippine Commonwealth Army including local recognized guerrillas against the Japanese Imperial forces, the earlier setup was used once again.

With the amendment of the city's charter in 1951, the position became an elective post. The first mayoral election was in 1951, and Manila's congressman from the 2nd district Arsenio Lacson defeated incumbent Manuel de la Fuente. A few years after the declaration of martial law by President Ferdinand Marcos, Manila and nearby cities like Quezon City, Caloocan, and Pasay, were overshadowed by the office of the governor of the newly created Metro Manila, whom Marcos appointed his wife, Imelda Marcos, to the position.

With Arsenio Lacson becoming the first elected mayor, the city of Manila underwent The Golden Age, was revitalized, and once again became the "Pearl of the Orient", a moniker it earned before the outbreak of the war. After Mayor Lacson's term in the 1950s, the city was led by Mayor Antonio Villegas during most of the 1960s, and Mayor Ramon Bagatsing for nearly the entire decade of the 1970s until the 1986 People Power Revolution that overthrew President Marcos.

Mayors Lacson, Villegas, and Bagatsing are often collectively considered as "the Big Three of Manila" for their rather long tenures as the city hall's chief executive (continuously for over three decades, from 1952 to 1986), but more importantly, for their indelible contribution to the development and progress of the city and their lasting legacy in uplifting the quality of life and welfare of the people of Manila.

With the ouster of Marcos following the People Power Revolution, President Corazon Aquino vacated all local executive officials and appointed officers in charge (OICs) in their place; she appointed party-mate Mel Lopez as OIC of Manila. Local elections were held in 1988, and Lopez was elected as mayor. The Local Government Code was enacted in 1991, and standardized the powers of Manila's mayor making it at par with other cities in the country.

The office of the mayor is often used as a springboard for further political ambitions. In 1961, Lacson bolted the Nacionalista Party to become the campaign manager of the Liberal Party's Diosdado Macapagal's presidential campaign. After Macapagal's victory, Lacson returned with the Nacionalistas and became a critic of the Macapagal administration. Lacson would've been likely the Nacionalista's candidate for the presidency in 1965, had not death intervened in 1962. In 1998, the sitting mayor of Manila, Alfredo Lim, did run as the Liberal Party's candidate for the presidency, but was beaten by Joseph Estrada, finishing fifth in a field of ten candidates, garnering 9% of the vote; Estrada later nominated him as Secretary of the Interior and Local Government. Lim later ran and won a Senate seat in 2004, but forfeited it three years when he ran and won as mayor again. Estrada, who was previously the mayor of bordering San Juan, defeated Lim as mayor of Manila in 2013. Their vice mayor, Isko Moreno, ran for the Senate and lost in 2016. Moreno defeated both Estrada and Lim in 2019. In 2021, Moreno announced his candidacy for president in the 2022 presidential election. Days later, Moreno's opponent Manny Pacquiao chose former mayor Lito Atienza as his running mate for vice president. Moreno, Atienza, and Pacquiao both lost their bids in 2022, respectively.

The longest-serving mayor of Manila is Ramon Bagatsing, who continuously served as the city's chief executive from 1971 until 1986. His tenure could have been longer if his term was not disrupted by the forced resignation of all local government unit heads and the appointment of officers in charge in their place after the 1986 revolution, to which Bagatsing fully supported and complied with, voluntarily handing over his position to OIC Mel Lopez.

== List ==
| No. | Image | Name of mayor | Party | Term | Start of term | End of term | Vice mayor(s) |
Appointive position (1901–1951)
| 1 | | Arsenio Cruz Herrera | Federalista | N/A | August 7, 1901 | September 18, 1905 (Note: Resigned from office) | Ramón J. Fernández |
| 2 | | Félix M. Roxas | Federalista | N/A | September 19, 1905 | January 15, 1917 | Ramón J. Fernández |
| 2 | | Félix M. Roxas | Federalista | N/A | September 19, 1905 | January 15, 1917 | Ramón J. Fernández; Isabelo de los Reyes; Justo Lukban; Pablo Ocampo |
| 2 | | Félix M. Roxas | Federalista | N/A | September 19, 1905 | January 15, 1917 | Pablo Ocampo |
| 3 | | Justo Lukban | Liga Popular | N/A | January 16, 1917 | March 6, 1920 | Pablo Ocampo |
| 4 | | Ramón J. Fernández | Democrata | N/A | March 7, 1920 | July 16, 1923 | Juan Posadas Jr. |
| 5 | | Eulogio A. Rodriguez Sr. | Democrata | N/A | July 17, 1923 | February 8, 1924 | Juan Posadas Jr. |
| 6 | | Miguel Romuáldez | Nacionalista | N/A | February 9, 1924 | August 31, 1927 | Tomás Earnshaw |
| 7 | | Tomás Earnshaw | Nacionalista | N/A | September 1, 1927 | December 31, 1933 | |
| 7 | | Tomás Earnshaw | Nacionalista | N/A | September 1, 1927 | December 31, 1933 | Juan Posadas Jr. Isabelo de los Reyes; Jorge B. Vargas |
| 7 | | Tomás Earnshaw | Nacionalista | N/A | September 1, 1927 | December 31, 1933 | Jorge B. Vargas |
| 8 | | Juan Posadas Jr. | Nacionalista | N/A | January 1, 1934 | January 4, 1940 (Note: Died in office) | Jorge B. Vargas |
| 9 | | Eulogio Rodriguez | Nacionalista | N/A | January 5, 1940 | August 28, 1941 | Carmen Planas |
| 10 | | Juan G. Nolasco | Nacionalista | N/A | August 29, 1941 | December 23, 1941 | Hermenegildo Atienza |
| 11 | | Jorge B. Vargas | Nacionalista | N/A | December 24, 1941 | January 26, 1942 | Hermenegildo Atienza |
| 11 | | Jorge B. Vargas | KALIBAPI | N/A | December 24, 1941 | January 26, 1942 | Hermenegildo Atienza |
| 12 | | Leon Guinto Sr. | KALIBAPI | N/A | January 27, 1942 | July 17, 1944 | Hermenegildo Atienza |
| 13 | | Hermenegildo Atienza | KALIBAPI | N/A | July 18, 1944 | July 18, 1945 | Carmen Planas |
| 14 | | Juan G. Nolasco | Nacionalista | N/A | July 19, 1945 | June 6, 1946 | Carmen Planas |
| 15 | | Valeriano E. Fugoso Sr. | Liberal | N/A | June 7, 1946 | December 31, 1947 | Carmen Planas |
| 16 | | Manuel de la Fuente | Liberal | N/A | January 1, 1948 | December 31, 1951 | Carmen Planas |
| 16 | | Manuel de la Fuente | Liberal | N/A | January 1, 1948 | December 31, 1951 | Iñigo Ed. Regalado |
Elective position (1952–present)
| 17 | | Arsenio Lacson | Nacionalista | 1951 | January 1, 1952 | April 15, 1962 | Jesus Marcos Roces |
| 17 | | Arsenio Lacson | Nacionalista | 1955 | January 1, 1952 | April 15, 1962 | Jesus Marcos Roces |
| 17 | | Arsenio Lacson | Nacionalista | 1959 | January 1, 1952 | April 15, 1962 | Antonio Villegas |
| 18 | | Antonio Villegas | Liberal | 1959 | April 16, 1962 | December 31, 1971 | Herminio A. Astorga |
| 18 | | Antonio Villegas | Liberal | 1963 | April 16, 1962 | December 31, 1971 | Herminio A. Astorga |
| 18 | | Antonio Villegas | Liberal | 1967 | April 16, 1962 | December 31, 1971 | Felicisimo Cabigao |
| 18 | | Antonio Villegas | Liberal | 1967 | April 16, 1962 | December 31, 1971 | Ernesto Maceda |
| 18 | | Antonio Villegas | Liberal | 1967 | April 16, 1962 | December 31, 1971 | Danilo Lacuna |
| 18 | | Antonio Villegas | Liberal | 1967 | April 16, 1962 | December 31, 1971 | Mel Lopez |
| 19 | | Ramon Bagatsing | Liberal | 1971 | January 1, 1972 | March 26, 1986 (Note: At this time, after the 1986 EDSA Revolution, President Corazon Aquino forced the resignation of all local government unit heads and appointed officers in charge in their place.) | Martin B. Isidro Sr. |
| 19 | | Ramon Bagatsing | Liberal | 1971 | January 1, 1972 | March 26, 1986 | James Barbers |
| 19 | | Ramon Bagatsing | KBL | 1980 | January 1, 1972 | March 26, 1986 | James Barbers |
| 20 | | Mel Lopez (Note: Officer-in-charge) | UNIDO | 1980 | March 26, 1986 | December 1, 1987 | Bambi M. Ocampo |
| 20 | | Mel Lopez | PDP–Laban | 1980 | March 26, 1986 | December 1, 1987 | Ernesto A. Nieva |
| 21 | | Gregorio Ejercito | N/A | 1980 | December 2, 1987 | February 2, 1988 | Ernesto A. Nieva |
| 22 | | Mel Lopez | PDP–Laban | 1988 | February 3, 1988 | June 30, 1992 | Danilo Lacuna |
| 22 | | Mel Lopez | LDP | 1988 | February 3, 1988 | June 30, 1992 | Danilo Lacuna |
| 22 | | Mel Lopez | Lakas | 1988 | February 3, 1988 | June 30, 1992 | Ernesto Maceda Jr. |
| 23 | | Alfredo Lim | PRP | 1992 | June 30, 1992 | March 27, 1998 | Lito Atienza |
| 23 | | Alfredo Lim | Liberal | 1995 | June 30, 1992 | March 27, 1998 | Lito Atienza |
| 24 | | Lito Atienza | Liberal | 1995 | March 27, 1998 | June 30, 2007 | Ernesto A. Nieva |
| 24 | | Lito Atienza | Liberal | 1995 | March 27, 1998 | June 30, 2007 | Larry Silva |
| 24 | | Lito Atienza | Liberal | 1998 | March 27, 1998 | June 30, 2007 | Danilo Lacuna |
| 24 | | Lito Atienza | Liberal | 2001 | March 27, 1998 | June 30, 2007 | Danilo Lacuna |
| 24 | | Lito Atienza | Liberal | 2004 | March 27, 1998 | June 30, 2007 | Danilo Lacuna |
| 25 | | Alfredo Lim | PMP | 2007 | June 30, 2007 | June 30, 2013 | Isko Moreno |
| 25 | | Alfredo Lim | Liberal | 2010 | June 30, 2007 | June 30, 2013 | Isko Moreno |
| 26 | | Joseph Estrada | UNA | 2013 | June 30, 2013 | June 30, 2019 | Isko Moreno |
| 26 | | Joseph Estrada | PMP | 2016 | June 30, 2013 | June 30, 2019 | Honey Lacuna |
| 27 | | Isko Moreno | Asenso | 2019 | June 30, 2019 | June 30, 2022 | Honey Lacuna |
| 28 | | Honey Lacuna Pangan | Asenso | 2022 | June 30, 2022 | June 30, 2025 | Yul Servo |
| 29 | | Isko Moreno | Aksyon | 2025 | June 30, 2025 | Incumbent | Chi Atienza |

== Vice mayor ==
The vice mayor is the second-highest official of the city. The vice mayor is elected via popular vote; although most mayoral candidates have running mates, the vice mayor is elected separately from the mayor. This can result in the mayor and the vice mayor coming from different political parties.

The vice mayor is the presiding officer of the Manila City Council, although they can only vote as the tiebreaker. When a mayor is removed from office, the vice mayor becomes the mayor until the scheduled next election.

=== List ===
| # | Name | Image | Party | Start of term | End of term |
Appointive position (1901–1951)
| 1 | | Ramón J. Fernández | Nacionalista | August 7, 1901 | August 7, 1907 |
| 2 | | Honorio Lopez | | August 7, 1907 | August 7, 1909 |
| 3 | | Isabelo de los Reyes | Nacionalista | August 7, 1909 | August 7, 1911 |
| 4 | | Justo Lukban | Liga Popular | August 8, 1911 | August 8, 1915 |
| 5 | | Pablo Ocampo | Nacionalista | August 8, 1915 | March 6, 1920 |
| 6 | | Juan Posadas Jr. | Nacionalista | March 7, 1920 | February 8, 1924 |
| 7 | | Tomás Earnshaw | Nacionalista | February 9, 1924 | August 31, 1927 |
| 8 | | Juan Posadas Jr. | Nacionalista | September 1, 1927 | December 31, 1929 |
| 9 | | Isabelo de los Reyes | Nacionalista | January 1, 1930 | December 31, 1931 |
| 10 | | Jorge B. Vargas | Nacionalista | January 1, 1932 | January 4, 1940 |
| 10 | | Carmen Planas | Young Philippines | January 5, 1940 | August 28, 1941 |
| 12 | | Hermenegildo Atienza | Nacionalista | August 29, 1941 | July 17, 1944 |
| 13 | | Carmen Planas | Young Philippines | July 18, 1944 | December 31, 1949 |
| 14 | | Iñigo Ed. Regalado | | January 1, 1950 | December 31, 1951 |
Elective position (1952–present)
| 15 | | Bartolome Gatmaitan | | January 1, 1952 | December 31, 1955 |
| 16 | | Jesus M. R. Roces | | January 1, 1956 | December 30, 1959 |
| 17 | | Antonio Villegas | Liberal | December 30, 1959 | April 15, 1962 |
| 18 | | Herminio A. Astorga | Liberal | April 16, 1962 | December 31, 1967 |
| 19 | | Felicisimo R. Cabigao | Nacionalista | January 1, 1968 | December 31, 1969 |
| 20 | | Ernesto Maceda | Nacionalista | January 1, 1970 | August 31, 1970 |
| 21 | | Danny Lacuna | Liberal | September 1, 1970 | April 30, 1971 |
| 22 | | Mel Lopez | Liberal | May 1, 1971 | December 31, 1971 |
| 23 | | Martin B. Isidro Sr. | Liberal | January 1, 1972 | December 31, 1977 |
| 24 | | James Barbers | KBL | January 1, 1978 | March 26, 1986 |
| 25 | | Bambi M. Ocampo | | March 26, 1986 | April 27, 1987 |
| 26 | | Ernesto A. Nieva | | April 28, 1987 | February 2, 1988 |
| 27 | | Danny Lacuna | PDP–Laban | February 3, 1988 | January 31, 1992 |
| 28 | | Ernesto V.P. Maceda Jr. | NPC | February 1, 1992 | June 30, 1992 |
| 29 | | Lito Atienza | PRP | June 30, 1992 | March 27, 1998 |
| 30 | | Ernesto A. Nieva | Liberal | March 27, 1998 | April 28, 1998 |
| 31 | | Larry Silva | Lakas | April 28, 1998 | June 30, 1998 |
| 32 | | Danny Lacuna | LAMMP | June 30, 1998 | June 30, 2007 |
| 32 | | Danny Lacuna | PDP–Laban | June 30, 1998 | June 30, 2007 |
| 32 | | Danny Lacuna | Asenso | June 30, 1998 | June 30, 2007 |
| 33 | | Isko Moreno | Asenso | June 30, 2007 | June 30, 2016 |
| 34 | | Honey Lacuna | Asenso | June 30, 2016 | June 30, 2022 |
| 35 | | Yul Servo | Asenso | June 30, 2022 | June 30, 2025 |
| 36 | | Chi Atienza | Aksyon | June 30, 2025 | incumbent |

== Elections ==
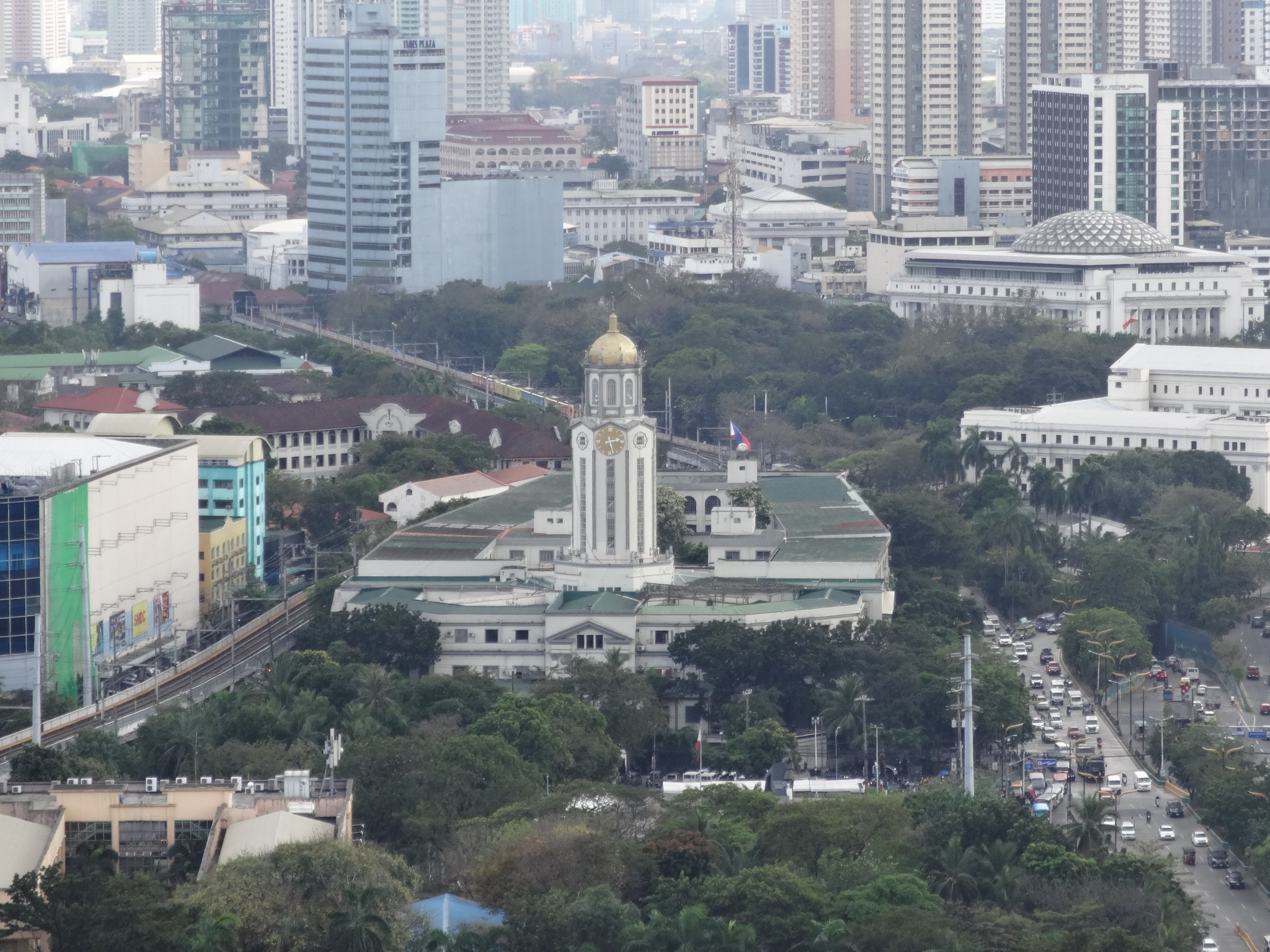
The mayor of Manila holds office at the Manila City Hall.

- 1951 Manila mayoral election
- 1955 Manila mayoral election
- 1959 Manila mayoral election
- 1963 Manila mayoral election
- 1967 Manila mayoral election
- 1971 Manila mayoral election
- 1980 Manila mayoral election
- 1988 Manila local elections
- 1992 Manila local elections
- 1995 Manila local elections
- 1998 Manila local elections
- 2001 Manila local elections
- 2004 Manila local elections
- 2007 Manila local elections
- 2010 Manila local elections
- 2013 Manila local elections
- 2016 Manila local elections
- 2019 Manila local elections
- 2022 Manila local elections
- 2025 Manila local elections
- 2028 Manila local elections

== See also ==
- Gobernadorcillo
- Cabeza de Barangay
- Legislative districts of Manila. representation in the House of Representatives
- Manila City Council
