= Charito Planas =

Filipina lawyer, environmentalist, politician, and human rights activist (1930–2017)

Vice Mayor of Quezon City
- In office June 30, 1992 – January 23, 1995
- Mayor: Mel Mathay
- Preceded by: Alicia Herrera
- Succeeded by: Herbert Bautista

Personal details
- Born: Rosario Lim Planas; April 28, 1930 Tondo, Manila, Philippine Islands
- Died: December 7, 2017 (aged 87) Marikina, Metro Manila, Philippines
- Party: Liberal (1960s–1972; 1987–1998); Aksyon Demokratiko (1998); LABAN (1978); Citizens League for Good Government (1971)
- Relations: Carmen Planas (sister)
- Education: University of the Philippines Diliman

Rosario "Charito" Lim Planas (April 28, 1930 – December 7, 2017) was a Filipino lawyer, environmentalist, politician, and human rights activist. She is the younger sister of first female Manila Vice Mayor Carmen Planas. In Quezon City, Planas ran unsuccessfully for vice mayor in 1963 and for mayor in 1971.

Planas was an active opposition figure during the martial law period under President Ferdinand Marcos, being jailed and placed under house arrest for a combined two years. In April 1978, she ran for a seat in the Interim Batasang Pambansa under the Laban opposition banner, but lost. After authorities charged Planas with subversion in the same month, she escaped to Malaysia and was later granted asylum in the United States, where she lived in exile from 1978 to 1986.

Upon returning to the Philippines, she helped revive the Liberal Party and ran for mayor of Quezon City in 1988, losing to incumbent OIC mayor Brigido Simon Jr. She later served for one term as Quezon City vice mayor from 1992 to 1995. During the 1998 Quezon City elections, Planas resigned from the Liberal Party due to its decision to nominate non-candidate Rudy Fernandez for mayor over her, citing it as a "betrayal" of the party's values; she ran as an independent mayoral candidate instead, but lost to incumbent mayor Mel Mathay.

== Early life and education ==
Planas was born on April 28, 1930 in Tondo, Manila during the American administration of the Philippines.

She graduated from the University of the Philippines Diliman with a law degree.

== Career ==
Planas ran for vice mayor of Quezon City as the running mate of Charlie Albert in 1963, but lost to Mariano Santa Romana and incumbent mayor Norberto S. Amoranto respectively. She later ran for Quezon City mayor under the Citizens League for Good Government in 1971, this time with Albert as her vice mayoral running mate, but both lost once again.

=== Activism against Marcos ===
She fought against the Marcos' dictatorship by protesting before the Supreme Court, through Planas vs. Comelec, the plebiscite that ratified the 1973 Constitution. Like other Marcos' opponents, she was later arrested by the authorities in November 1973 and detained with some of other opponents. She was placed under solitary confinement when the authorities aware of boosting up the morale of another anti-Marcos detainees. Her total jail time lasted up to 14 months, while her succeeding house arrest lasted 16 months.

=== 1978 IBP election; exile in the United States ===
Planas became a candidate for Metro Manila, also known as Region IV, in the 1978 Interim Batasang Pambansa (IBP) elections under the banner of Lakas ng Bayan (or Laban) led by political prisoner Ninoy Aquino. All of the Laban candidates, including Planas, lost. On April 7, the day of the election, Planas' house in Quezon City was raided by authorities, who thus filed subversion charges against her after claiming to have found numerous subversive documents and a .30 caliber carbine in her residence. Soon after the raid, Planas evaded the authorities and escaped to Sabah in Malaysia using a single-engine motorboat, and was "rescued" by US officials a month later. Planas later arrived in the United States on June 5, 1978, and was granted asylum by early July.

Planas lived in-exile in the state of New York. An impoverished freedom fighter, she worked with another in-exiled anti-Marcos Filipino dissenters, spoke at rallies to denounce the dictatorship, lobbied to the US legislators for halting of military aid to the Philippine government. She also interviewed on television and writing the regime situation in newspapers in New York.

In order to sustain everyday life, she worked in telemarketing to demonstrating food products at supermarkets, and delivering pizza. Despite donations, specifically food and cash from sympathizers (Filipinos and Americans), she had small income and living in a poorly-ventilated and cold space in the basement of an apartment building, of which she only have rented.

When elections were held in 1984 for the Regular Batasang Pambansa, Planas was among the opposition figures who called for its boycott.

After two failed attempts to retrieve travel documents from the Philippine Embassy in the United States to return to the Philippines, she received her passport on March 6, 1986, a week after the People Power Revolution deposed President Marcos from power. Before leaving the US, Planas participated in protests in front of the State Department and the White House denouncing America's granting of asylum to Marcos and his family. Planas returned to the Philippines on March 15, 1986.

=== Political career ===
After her return from exile, Planas helped revive the dormant Liberal Party. She ran for mayor of Quezon City in 1988, but lost to incumbent mayor Brigido Simon Jr.

In 1992, she was picked by then-Congressman Mel Mathay to be his running mate in the mayoral elections, and the tandem subsequently won election.

Planas resigned from the Liberal Party in March 1998, after the party decided to nominate actor Rudy Fernandez as its Quezon City mayoral candidate instead of her. The LP's nomination came as a surprise, as Fernandez had already backed out of the race to serve as campaign manager for mayoral candidate Herbert Bautista; Fernandez soon accepted the nomination. Planas denounced the party's decision as a "betrayal of the high and lofty principles on which the LP was founded... [It is] indeed a direct stab at my heart." By May 1998, she and her running mate, councilor Jopet Sison, lost the mayoralty election to incumbent mayor Mathay and councilor Fe Consuelo Angeles respectively.

She served as the spokesperson of former president Gloria Macapagal Arroyo as undersecretary in the Office of the President from 2009 until 2010.

== Personal life ==
At the age of 87, Planas died in her sleep at her residence in Marikina.
