= Carmen Planas =

Filipino politician

The Honorable Carmen Planas
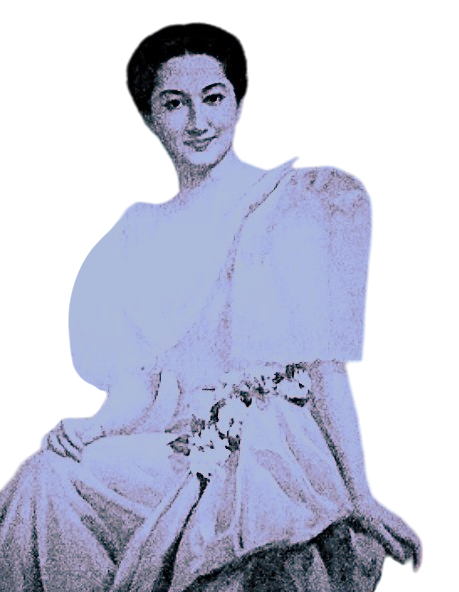

11th and 13th Vice Mayor of Manila
- In office July 18, 1944 – December 31, 1949
- Mayor: Hermenegildo Atienza (1944–1945); Juan Nolasco (1945–1946); Valeriano E. Fugoso, Sr. (1946–1947); Manuel de la Fuente (1948–1949)
- Preceded by: Hermenegildo Atienza
- Succeeded by: Iñigo Ed. Regalado
- In office January 5, 1940 – August 28, 1941
- Mayor: Eulogio Rodriguez
- Preceded by: Jorge B. Vargas
- Succeeded by: Hermenegildo Atienza

Member of the Manila Municipal Board
- In office January 1, 1934 – January 4, 1940

Personal details
- Born: Carmen Lim Planas; March 23, 1914 Tondo, Manila, Philippine Islands
- Died: August 25, 1964 (aged 50) Chicago, Illinois, U.S.
- Resting place: Manila North Cemetery, Manila, Philippines
- Relatives: Charito Planas (sister)
- Education: University of the Philippines
- Profession: Lawyer
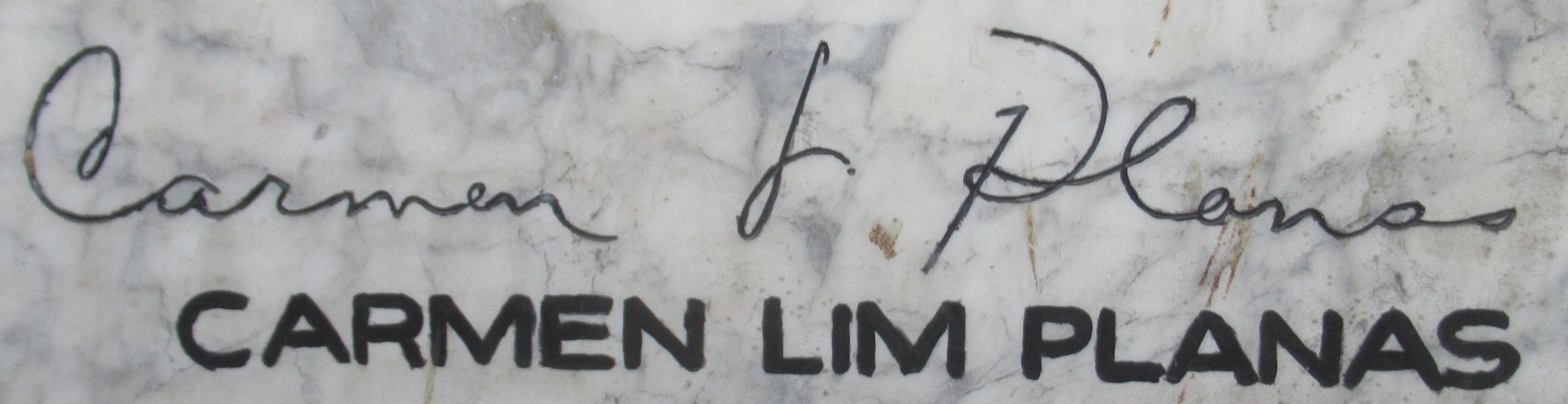
- Signature

Carmen Lim Planas (March 23, 1914 – August 25, 1964) was the first woman to be elected to any public office in the Philippines when she was elected municipal board member of Manila by general suffrage in 1934. She would later serve as the capital city's first female Vice Mayor of Manila from 1940 to 1941 and again from 1944 to 1949.

== Formative years ==
Carmen Planas was born on March 23, 1914, in Tondo, Manila, to Illuminado Planas and Concepcion Lim. Her siblings include attorney Charito Lim Planas (a former vice mayor of Quezon City), socialite Adela Planas-Paterno (former Miss Visayas), and businessman Severino L. Planas.

At Zaragosa Elementary School, she was top pupil in her fourth grade. She was class valedictorian in grade school. In the seventh grade, she transferred to Collegia de Sta. Rosa where she was also a top student. She attended high school at the Holy Ghost College (now known as the Holy Spirit College).

She enrolled in the prelaw course at the University of the Philippines, where she became a scholar. Her oratotical and debating ability and zeal earned her gold medals in the U.P. College of Law.

Once her debating ability was tested on the issue of women suffrage. She was assigned to take the affirmative side, and advocated it thoroughly. She was then assigned to argue the opposite side on the same issue, and defended it even more convincingly. This display of talent earned her two medals. She also won the Spanish declamation contest.

== Political career ==
During the height of the Cuervo-Barredo case, Planas made an eloquent and impassioned speech in front of a youth rally, criticizing Commonwealth President Manuel Quezon's interference in the judiciary. The following day she appeared on the front pages of the metropolitan papers with the headline "U.P. COED ATTACKS QUEZON." She was summoned to Malacañang and asked why she lambasted the president. She replied that she was only criticizing what the president had done.

After the incident, Wenceslao Vinzons, who was the leader of the Young Philippines Party, nominated her to be their party candidate for the then municipal board of Manila (now Manila City Council). Later, she became the first woman elected to the municipal board. Planas was nicknamed "Manila's Darling" and "Manila's Sweetheart" by her peers.

== Social works ==
When World War II came to the Philippines, Planas did not stop serving her fellows. She did some undercover work, rendered exemplary service to the guerillas. She was always seen bringing food and other forms of aid to hospitals and to the homes of the injured ex-servicemen. After the war, she served in various positions in the government. She became the governor and secretary of the Philippine National Red Cross, She was also legal adviser to the Philippine Association of Women Doctors, the Filipino Youth Symphony Organization, and the Women's International League.

In recognition of her excellent work, she was sent by the Philippine National Red Cross as the lone delegate to the convention of Red Cross governors in Oslo, Norway. She was also the Philippines Lawyers Association delegate to the Lawyers International Conference in Monte Carlo, Monaco.

== Death and legacy ==
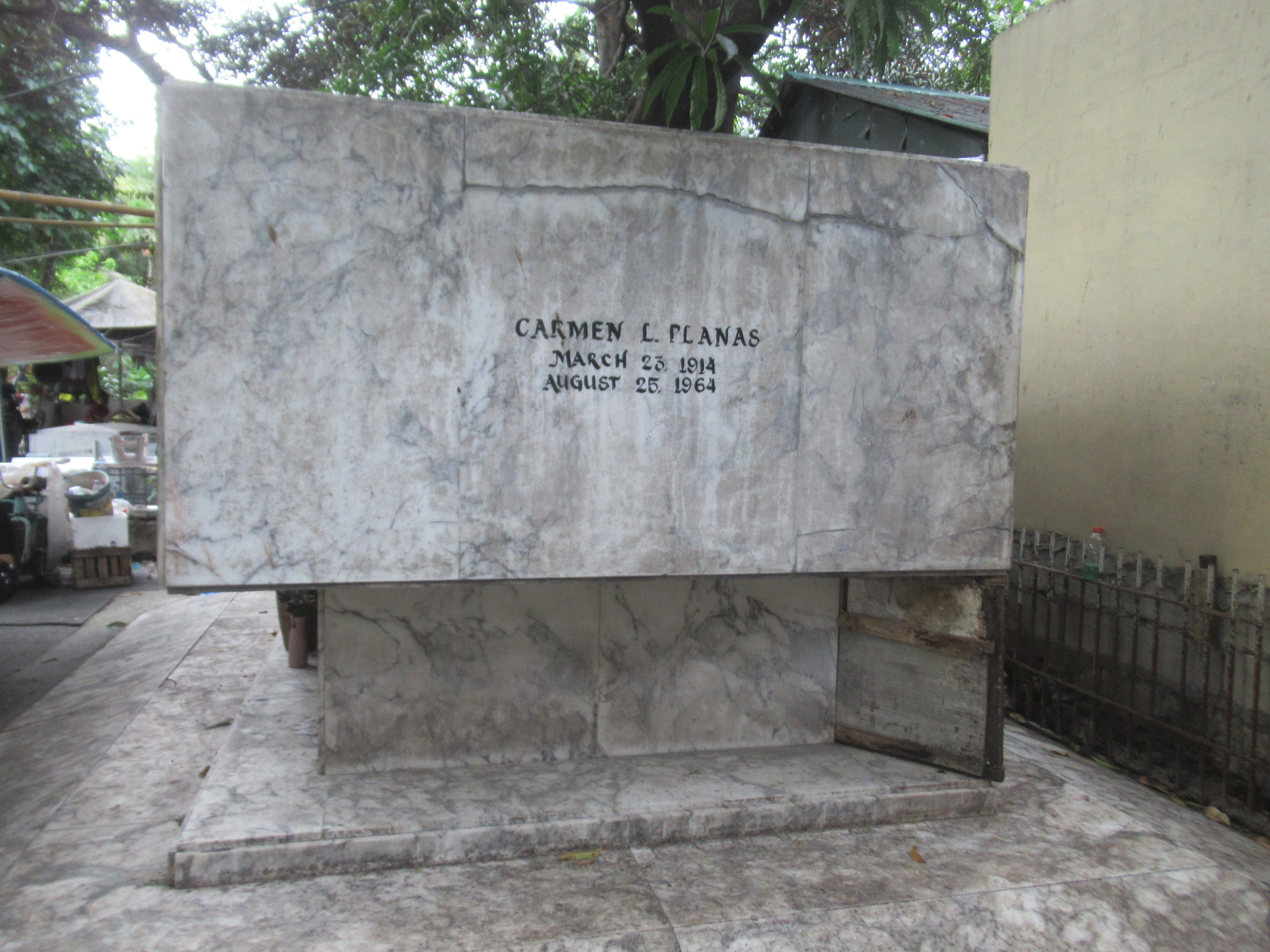
Planas' grave at the Manila North Cemetery

Planas died at the Grant Hospital in Chicago, Illinois, on August 25, 1964, at the age of 50. Planas had devoted her life to public service, and was never married. She had a simple philosophy in life:

"I just do the best I can in any given problem. The results I leave to God who must have a reason for everything that happens."

A street in the Manila districts of Tondo and San Nicolas was renamed after her.

Political offices
| Preceded by Hermenegildo Atienza | Vice Mayor of Manila; 1944–1951 | Succeeded by Iñigo Ed. Regalado |
| Preceded by Jorge B. Vargas | Vice Mayor of Manila; 1940–1941 | Succeeded by Hermenegildo Atienza |
