= Philippine Executive Commission =

Provisional Filipino government (1942–1943)

- Komisyong Tagapagpaganap ng Pilipinas
- Central government
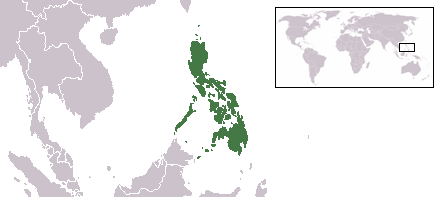
- Location of the Philippines in Southeast Asia.

Overview
- Established: January 3, 1942 (preceded by the Commonwealth of the Philippines that went exiled during the Japanese occupation)
- Dissolved: October 14, 1943 (succeeded by the Second Philippine Republic)
- Country: Philippines (under occupation by the Empire of Japan)
- Leader: Military Governor: Masaharu Homma (January 3, 1942 – June 8, 1942); Shizuichi Tanaka (June 8, 1942 – May 28, 1943); Shigenori Kuroda (May 28, 1943 – September 26, 1944); Chairman: Jorge B. Vargas (January 23, 1942 – October 14, 1943)
- Headquarters: Manila

The Philippine Executive Commission (PEC; Tagalog: Komisyong Tagapagpaganap ng Pilipinas) was a pro-Axis government set up to govern the Philippine archipelago during World War II. It was established with sanction from the occupying Imperial Japanese forces as an interim governing body prior to the establishment of the Japanese-backed, Second Philippine Republic.

== History ==
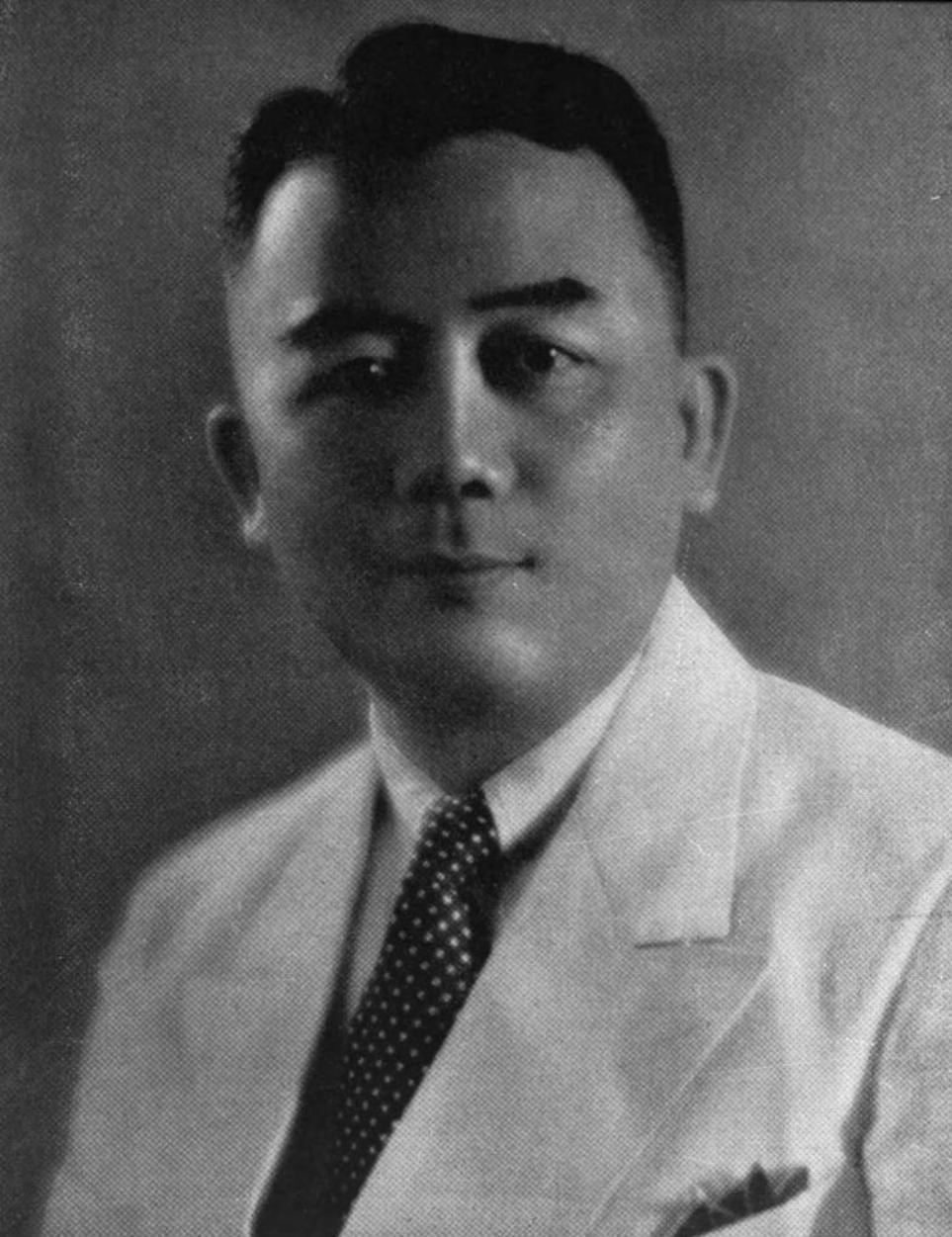
Jorge B. Vargas holds the highest position of power for a Filipino during the Philippine Executive Commission. Only to be replaced by Jose P. Laurel as the president when the Second Philippine Republic was created.

=== Establishment ===
The Philippine Executive Commission (PEC) was established on January 3, 1942, with Jorge B. Vargas as its first Chairman. It largely mirrored the Civilian Emergency Administration earlier appointed by President Manuel Quezon to administer the open city status of Manila and composed by the same officers that comprised the latter PEC. The PEC was created as the provisional caretaker government of the City of Greater Manila and eventually of the whole Philippines during the Japanese occupation of the country during World War II.

The PEC formally abolished all political parties on December 8, 1942, by virtue of Proclamation No. 109 creating the Kapisanan sa Paglilingkod sa Bagong Pilipinas (Association for Service to the New Philippines) or better known as the KALIBAPI.

The KALIBAPI was established to aim at the mental education, moral regeneration, physical invigoration, and economic rehabilitation of the Philippines under the guidance of the Japanese Military Administration. It was tasked to foster strong cooperation with the Japanese as part of the Order Great East Asia that promotes the lifting of the "great Oriental race." The KALIBAPI was appointed as a strong right arm of the Japanese occupational forces of the Philippines.

While the PEC consisted of many former members of the Commonwealth, President Quezon and Vice President Osmeña of the Commonwealth were forced to flee the country.

=== Economic control ===
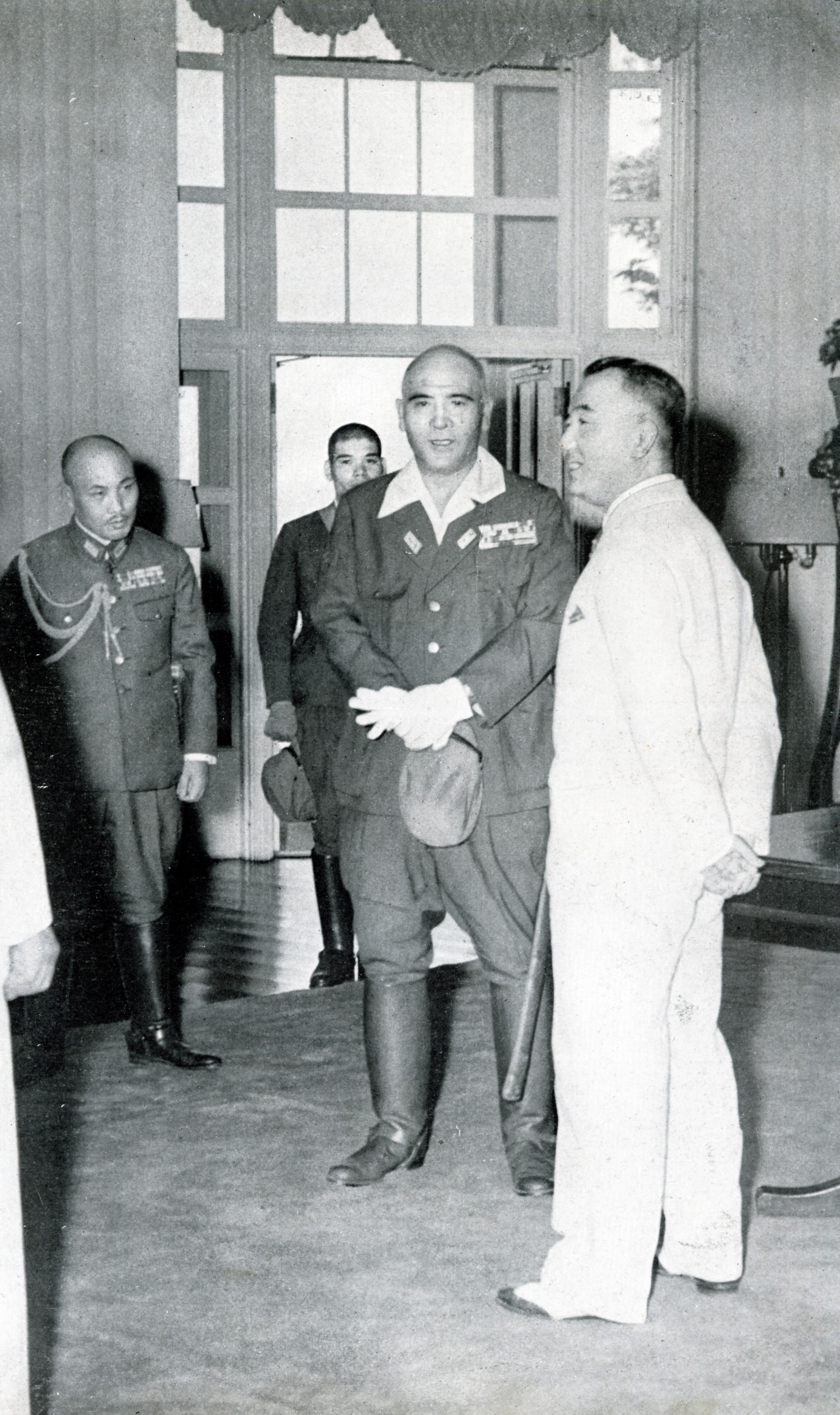
Jorge B Vargas and Masaharu Homma

In addition to the reallocation of food resources, the Japanese military government maintained tight economic control over the Philippine Republic by controlling the price of goods and services and taking control over private assets. Cooperation with the occupying government by Philippine authorities was common, Enterprises which were allied with the imperial government aided the Japanese by taking acquisition of key industries in the Philippine economy. The Japanese government also exerted its power over the Philippine National Bank in order to control the Philippine economy as well as contribute to the war effort.

The Philippine economy's rapid decline during Japanese occupation contributed to post-war anti-Japan sentiments. As the occupying government tried to maintain its control over the Philippine Republic, the public's attitude toward the government became increasingly strained, and the Japanese government resorted to even harsher treatment of its subjects.

=== Towards a Japanese-sponsored Independence ===
==== Framing a Constitution ====
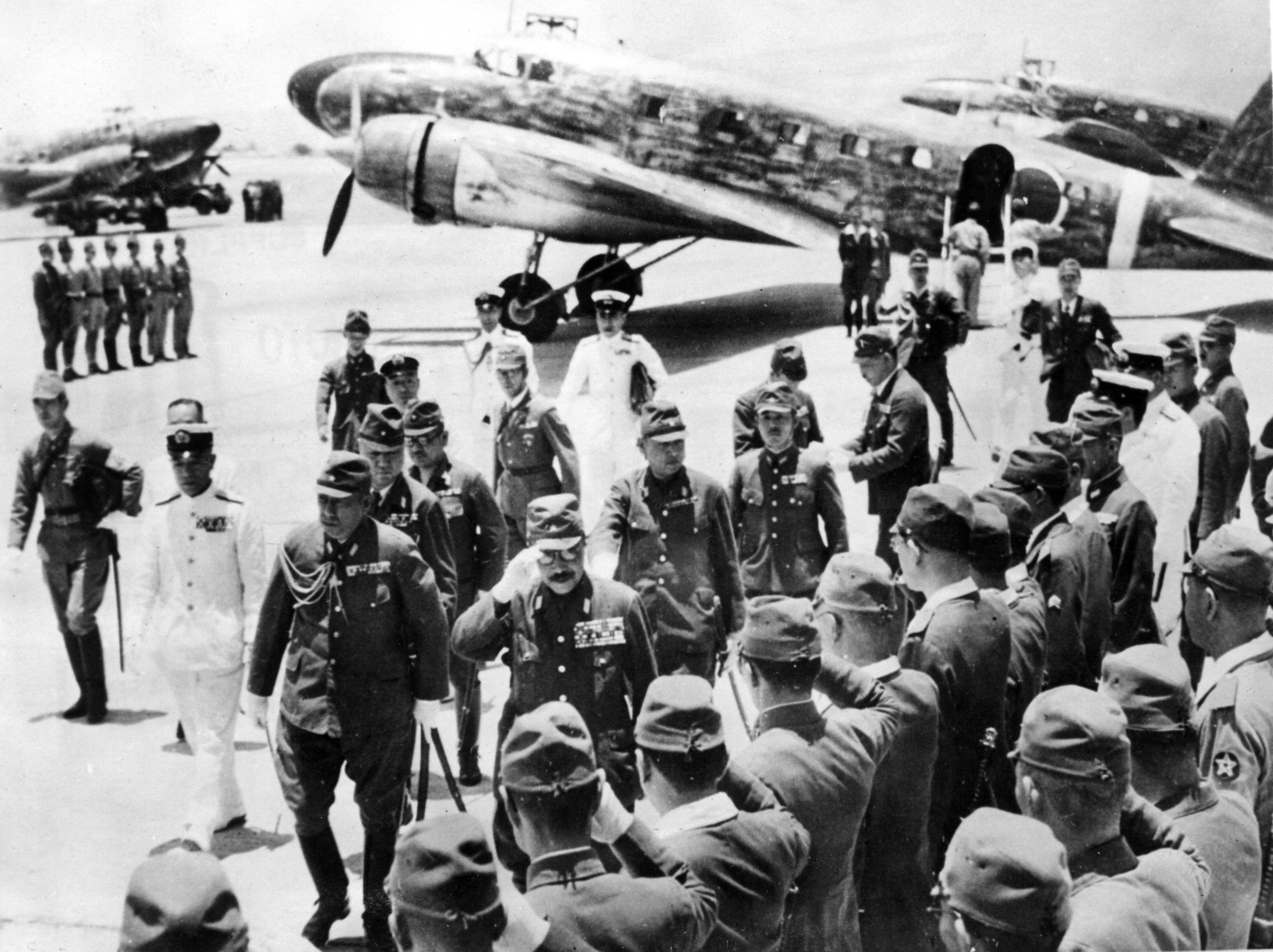
Japanese Prime Minister Hideki Tojo landed in Nichols Field, an airfield south of Manila, for state visit to the Philippines.

On May 6, 1943, Japanese Premier Hideki Tojo during a visit to the Philippines pledged to establish the Republic of the Philippines. This pledge of Tojo prompted the KALIBAPI to call for a convention on June 19, 1943, and twenty of its members were elected to form the Preparatory Commission for Independence. The commission tasked to draft a constitution for the Philippine Republic and elected head was José P. Laurel.

The Preparatory Commission presented its draft Constitution on September 4, 1943, and three days later, the KALIBAPI general assembly ratified the draft Constitution.

==== National legislature ====
By September 20, 1943, the KALIBAPI's representative groups in the country's provinces and cities elected from among themselves fifty four (54) members of the Philippine National Assembly, the legislature of the country, with fifty four (54) governors and city mayors as ex officio members.

Three days after establishing the National Assembly, its inaugural session was held at the pre-war Legislative Building and elected Benigno Aquino Sr. as its first Speaker and José P. Laurel as President of the New Philippine Republic.

==== Declaration of the Second Philippine Republic ====
The Japanese-sponsored establishment of the Republic of the Philippines was proclaimed on October 14, 1943, with José P. Laurel being sworn-in as President.

On the same day, a Pact of Alliance was signed between the new Philippine Republic and the Japanese government that was ratified two days later by the National Assembly.

The Philippine Republic was immediately recognized by Japan, and in the succeeding days by Germany, Thailand, Manchukuo, Burma, Croatia and Italy while neutral Spain sent its "greetings."

The first act the National Assembly and the Laurel administration passed was the creation on December 3, 1943, the Food Administration Office that grouped together under its umbrella all existing food control agencies. The new administration that was crafted out of the establishment of a Japanese-sponsored Philippine Executive Commission was barely managing a food shortage that grappled the whole country, allocating basic food stuffs left available by the Japanese military who prioritized allocation in favor of sustaining their war efforts.

== Composition ==
Office	Name	Term
Chairman	Jorge B. Vargas	1942–1943
Commissioner of Interior	Benigno Aquino Sr.	1942–1943
Commissioner of Finance	Antonio de las Alas	1942–1943
Commissioner of Agriculture and Commerce	Rafael Alunan Sr.	1942–1943
Commissioner of Justice	José P. Laurel	1942–1943
Commissioner of Education, Health and Public Welfare	Claro M. Recto	1942–1943
Commissioner of Labor	Quintín Paredes	1942–1943

== See also ==
- Demographic history of the Philippines
- Military history of the Philippines
- Timeline of Philippine history
- Japanese war crimes
- Bataan Death March
- Philippines campaign (1941–1942)
- Philippines campaign (1944–1945)
