= Herbert Bautista =

Filipino actor and politician (born 1968)

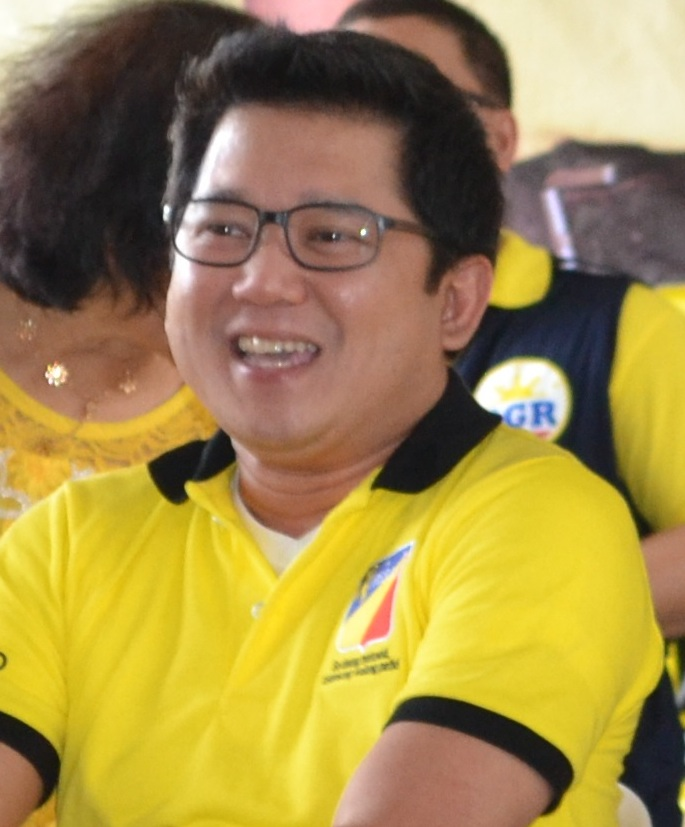
- Bautista in 2016

11th Mayor of Quezon City
- In office June 30, 2010 – June 30, 2019
- Vice Mayor: Joy Belmonte
- Preceded by: Feliciano Belmonte Jr.
- Succeeded by: Joy Belmonte

14th and 16th Vice Mayor of Quezon City
- In office June 30, 2001 – June 30, 2010
- Mayor: Feliciano Belmonte Jr.
- Preceded by: Connie Angeles
- Succeeded by: Joy Belmonte
- In office January 24, 1995 – April 6, 1998
- Mayor: Ismael Mathay, Jr.
- Preceded by: Charito Planas
- Succeeded by: Jorge Banal

Commissioner of the National Youth Commission
- In office April 7, 1998 – 2001

Member of the Quezon City Council
- In office June 30, 1992 – January 23, 1995
- Constituency: 3rd district
- In office 1986–1989
- Constituency: Kabataang Barangay National Federation (Youth Sector, as President)

Personal details
- Born: Herbert Constantine Maclang Bautista; May 12, 1968 (age 58) Quezon City, Philippines
- Party: NPC (1992–1995; 2017–present)
- Other political affiliations: PDP–Laban (2017); Liberal (2009–2017); Lakas–CMD (2002–2009); LAMMP (1998); Independent (2001–2002); LDP (1995–2001)
- Children: 4, including Harvey
- Education: San Beda College (BA); University of the Philippines Diliman (MPA); National Defense College of the Philippines
- Occupation: Actor, politician
- Nickname: General Bistek

Military service
- Allegiance: Philippines
- Branch/service: Philippine Army
- Years of service: 1992–present
- Rank: Brigadier general
- Commands: 1502nd Infantry Brigade (Ready Reserve); Light Armor Brigade (Standby Reserve)
- Awards: Military Merit Medal; Military Commendation Medal; Military Civic Action Medal

Herbert Constantine "Bistek" Maclang Bautista (born May 12, 1968) is a Filipino actor and politician who served as mayor of Quezon City, the Philippines' largest city by population, from 2010 to 2019.

Bautista has starred in numerous films and TV shows, including the 1984 coming-of-age film Bagets, the horror anthology series Shake, Rattle & Roll, and the children's show Kaluskos Musmos.

== Early life and education ==
He was born on May 12, 1968, in Quezon City to Herminio "Butch" Bautista (1934–2017), who became a two-term city councilor from the fourth district, and Rosario "Baby" Maclang (1947–2008), a restaurateur. He has two siblings, Hero, who became a Quezon City councilor from the 4th district, and Harlene (formerly married to Romnick Sarmienta).

He attended his tertiary education at San Beda College of Manila and graduated in 1992 with a degree of Bachelor of Arts in Philosophy and Letters. He was adjudged Most Outstanding Centennial Bedan Alumnus in recognition of his contribution and leadership in civil governance and politics. He studied law at New Era University though he did not finish it. He has units in degree of Master of Arts in Public Administration from the National College of Public Administration and Governance (NCPAG) at the University of the Philippines Diliman. He is an alumnus of the National Defense College of the Philippines where he obtained his Master in National Security Administration (MNSA) degree. He is working towards his Doctorate degree in Political Science at UP Diliman.

In a June 2024 interview, Ruffa Gutierrez revealed her serious relationship with Bautista. They first dated on the filming of the 2020 romantic comedy The House Arrest of Us with her daughters Lorin and Venice.

== Acting career ==
Bautista has been acting since he was 10 years old. He originally intended to become a dramatic actor with his introverted personality, but later on grew to be known as a comedian onscreen. films He was part of the popular gag show Kaluskos Musmos, which featured a scrappy bunch of children acting out adulthood for laughs. The show ran from the late 1970s to the mid-1980s.

He was known for his role as Reneboy in the hugely successful soap opera Flordeluna, which was aired on RPN-9 from 1978 to 1984.

== Filmography ==
=== Film ===
- Oh My Mama (1981)
- Bagets (1984) as Gilbert
- Hotshots (1984) as Boy
- Julian Vaquero (1984) as Dencio
- Bagets 2 (1984) as Gilbert
- Shake, Rattle & Roll (1984) as Douglas ("Manananggal" segment)
- Like Father, Like Son (1985) as Mariano "Nanoy" Batobalani
- Ma'am May We Go Out? (1985) as John Ramos
- Working Boys (1985) as Kermit
- Ninja Kids (1986) as Dodo
- Captain Barbell (1986) as Tengteng
- Takbo...! Bilis...! Takboooo (1987)
- Puto (1987) as Ivanhoe "Puto" de la Cruz
- Jack & Jill (1987) as Hilario/Jill
- Kumander Bawang: Kalaban ng Mga Aswang (1988) as Tikboy / Kumander Bawang
- Jockey T'yan (1988) as Juan/Johnny
- Jack & Jill sa Amerika (1988) as Hilario/Jill
- Pik Pak Boom (1988) as Danny/Berto
- M & M: The Incredible Twins (1989) as Marcelino
- Dear Diary (1989) as Badong/Matthew
- Hulihin si Nardong Toothpick (1990) as Nardong Toothpick
- Tootsie-Wootsie: Ang Bandang Walang Atrasan (1990)
- Robin Good: Sugod Nang Sugod (1991) as Big John
- Pitong Gamol (1991) as Jun Halo
- Daddy Goon (1992) as Kuliling
- Alabang Girls (1992) as Orot/Orly
- Mga S'yanong Parak (1993) as Hulyo
- Dunkin Donato (1993) as Buknoy
- Gin Kata (1993)
- Dobol Trobol (1994) as Wong
- Multo in the City (1994) as Oscar
- Ten Little Indians (1996) as Michael
- Parak: The Bobby Barbers Story (1997) as Pinggoy
- Ping Lacson: Supercop (2000) as Rivera
- Umaaraw, Umuulan (2006) as Berto
- Shake, Rattle and Roll Fourteen: The Invasion (2012) as Donald ("Pamana" segment)
- Raketeros (2013) as Berto
- Bob Ong's Lumayo Ka Nga sa Akin (2016)
- Silly Red Shoes (2019)

=== Television ===
- 2+2 (1977–1980)
- Clubhouse 9 (1977–1978)
- Basta Barkada (1978–1979)
- Broadkast Workshap (1978–1979)
- Dr. Potpot & the Satellite Kid (1985)
- Lovingly Yours (1985–1996)
- The Sharon Cuneta Show (1986–1997)
- Kalatong Pinggan (1987–1989)
- Ang Tabi Kong Mamaw (1987–1988)
- Young Love, Sweet Love (1988–1995)
- Eat Bulaga! (1989–1992)
- Bistek (1990–1992?) as Bistek
- Super Islaw (?)
- Ready Na Direk (1991–1994)
- Pandakekoks (1990–1991)
- Alabang Girls: The Sitcom Series (1992–1993)
- Tondominium (1992–1993)
- GMA Telecine Specials (1995)
- Mikee (1995)
- Mikee Forever: The Sitcom (1994–1995)
- Haybol Rambol (1994–1995)
- Mary D' Potter (2001)
- Wow! (2002)
- Klasmeyts (2002) as Host
- Super Inggo (2006) as Kumander Bawang
- Super Inggo 1.5: Ang Bagong Bangis (2007) as Kumander Bawang
- Sabi ni Nanay (2007)
- Ikaw Lamang (2014) as Algaro
- Home Sweetie Home (2015) as Himself
- Make It with You (2020)
- Puto as Ivanhoe "Puto" de la Cruz (2021)

== Political career ==
In 1986, Bautista campaigned for the reelection of president Ferdinand Marcos in the 1986 snap election.

From 1986 to 1989, he was president of the Kabataang Barangay National Federation and was appointed ex officio City Councilor representing the Youth Sector of Quezon City. From 1992 to 1995, he was elected as a regular Councilor of Quezon City from the 3rd district and was concurrently Chairperson of the Committee on Tourism and Cultural Affairs.

He was the youngest vice mayor of Quezon City when he was elected to the position in May 1995. Bautista became the first elected bachelor Vice Mayor of Quezon City.

In 1998, he ran for mayor but lost then-incumbent Mel Mathay, who was running for his third and final term. After he suffered defeat in election, he was appointed by then-president Joseph Estrada as commissioner at-large of the National Youth Commission.

In 2001, Bautista returned to politics when he was elected as vice mayor. He ran as the running mate of actor Rudy Fernandez, who lost the mayoralty race to Feliciano "Sonny" Belmonte Jr., who later became his political ally. He was reelected in 2004 and 2007 elections, serving three consecutive terms.

One of the younger officials of the country, who has spent a long time in government and the youth movement, Bautista is active in socio-civic activities. He is Board Director of the YMCA-QC, Inc., member of the Rotary Club of Kamuning, District 3780; founding president of the Association of Graduate Students and Alumni of the UP College of Public Administration in Diliman; board director of the Katipunan ng mga Artista sa Pelikulang Pilipino at Telebisyon (KAPPT) and member of the Philippine Constitution Association (PHILCONSA).

Bautista is the National President of the National Movement of Young Legislators (NMYL), a 6,000-member organization composed of vice governors, board members, vice mayors and councilors including Sangguniang Kabataan federation presidents.

On July 1, 2010, he took oath into office as the Mayor of Quezon City after his landslide victory in the 2010 local elections in Quezon City. Bautista defeated one of his opponents, Mel Mathay who defeated him 12 years prior and was running to return to mayoralty. His running mate was Joy Belmonte, daughter of outgoing mayor Sonny Belmonte. She was also successful in the vice mayoral race. Their oath with the elder Belmonte as a congressman and the city councilors was administered by Chief Justice Renato Corona. He was reelected in 2013 and 2016, serving two consecutive terms, before stepping down in 2019 due to term limits.

On October 6, 2021, Bautista announced that he is running for senator in the 2022 Philippine Senate election, his first venture into national politics after serving Quezon City for 3 decades. However, on February 10, 2022, he was dropped from the senatorial slate of Lacson–Sotto.

=== Legal issues ===
On November 28, 2023, Bautista, Aldrin Cuña and Alberto Morales, CEO of Geodata Solutions, Inc. were accused before the Sandiganbayan First Division in the alleged anomalous purchase of a hospital information system for a Quezon City hospital in June 2019 worth P16,295,300.

On December 4, 2023, Bautista pleaded not guilty before the Sandiganbayan over graft charges involving the misuse of P25.3 million in public funds for the installation of a solar power system and waterproofing works in a civic center building to Cygnet Energy and Power Asia, Inc. (Cygnet). He was acquitted in the case on December 12, 2025.

On March 14, 2024, the Sandiganbayan dismissed Bautista's and Cuña's motion for leave to file demurrer over the hospital case. On January 20, 2025, Bautista and Cuña were convicted by the Sandiganbayan of graft and sentenced to up to ten years' imprisonment and perpetual disqualification from holding public office over the same case.

== Military career ==
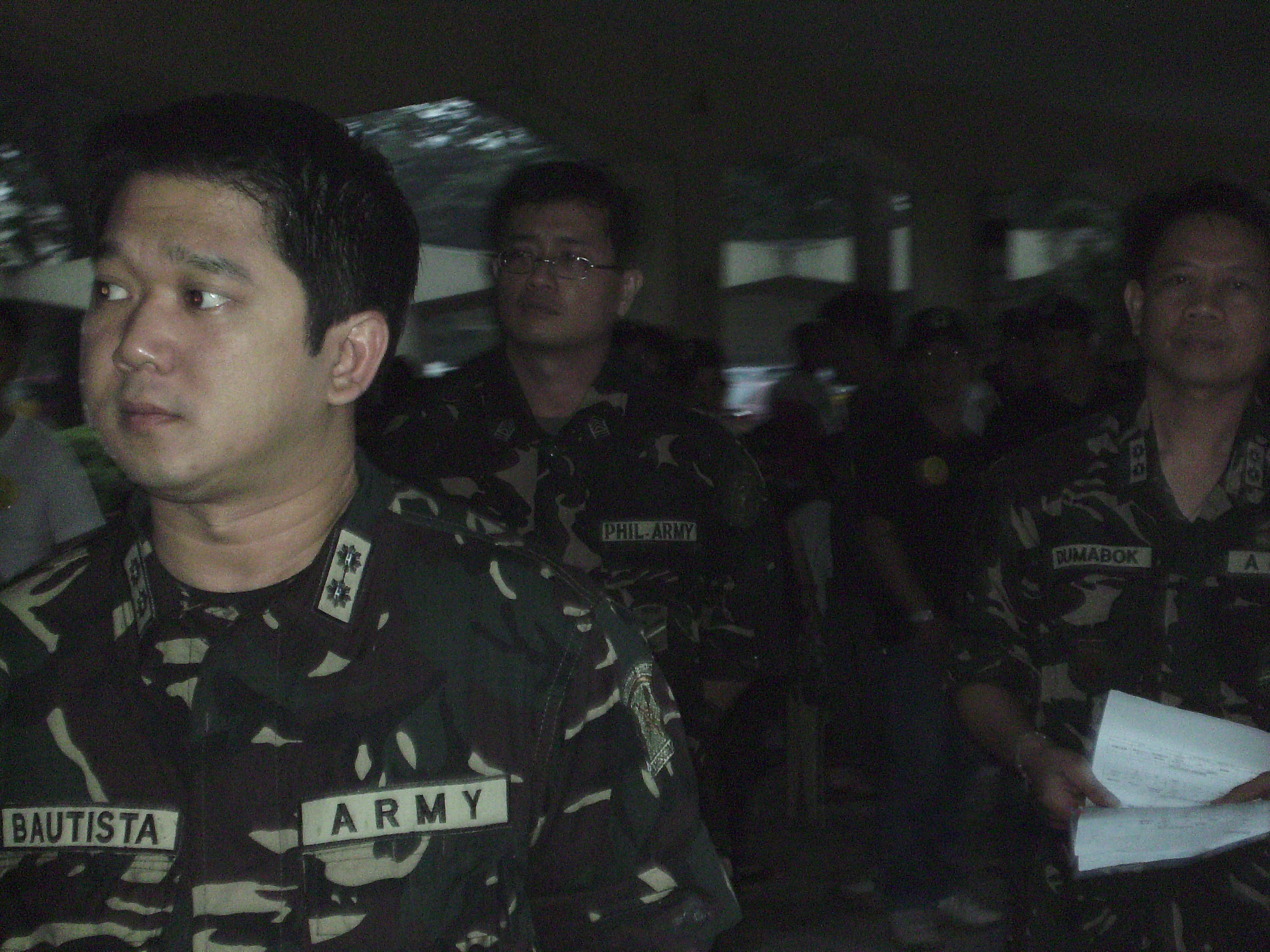
Bautista inspecting soldiers prior to their deployment for rehabilitation operations on areas affected by Typhoon Ketsana (Ondoy).

Herbert Bautista joined the reserve force of the AFP through the Reserve Command, PA and was subsequently enlisted as a Master Sergeant in the Philippine Army with completion of his Basic ROTC with then San Beda ROTC Unit.

He reported to the 131st (Standby Reserve) Division, PA and was given the designation of Brigade Sergeant Major of the newly formed Light Armor Brigade (Reserve).

He applied for a commission when he was Vice Mayor of Quezon City and was commissioned with the rank of Army Captain.

He resigned his commissioned as an Army Captain and was recommissioned as a Lieutenant Colonel through the commissioning program of the Master in National Security Administration (AFP Circular Nr. 30) of the National Defense College of the Philippines. In 2018, he was promoted to the rank of Brigadier General. He is the Commanding Officer of the 1502nd Infantry Brigade (Ready Reserve) which is a component of the 15th Infantry Division (Ready Reserve), Army Reserve Command.

== Awards ==
- Best Actor | Shake, Rattle and Roll | Metro Manila Film Festival, 1984
- Best Supporting Actor | Bobby Barbers: Parak | Famas, 1997

Political offices
Preceded by Charito Planas	Vice Mayor of Quezon City; 1995 – 1998	Succeeded by Jorge Banal
Preceded by Connie Angeles	Vice Mayor of Quezon City; 2001 – 2010	Succeeded by Joy Belmonte
Preceded by Feliciano Belmonte Jr.	Mayor of Quezon City; 2010 – 2019	Succeeded by Joy Belmonte
Awards
Preceded by Anthony Alonzo	Metro Manila Film Festival Award for Best Actor; 1984	Succeeded by Anthony Alonzo
