= Feliciano Belmonte Jr. =

Speaker of the House of Representatives of the Philippines from 2010 to 2016, 2001

Feliciano R. Belmonte Jr.
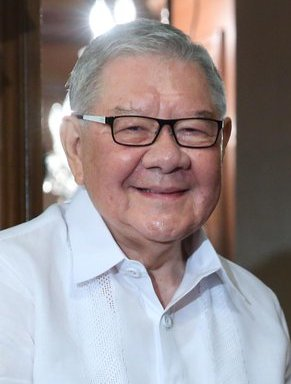
- Belmonte in 2016

20th & 23rd Speaker of the House of Representatives of the Philippines
- In office July 26, 2010 – June 30, 2016
- Preceded by: Prospero Nograles
- Succeeded by: Pantaleon Alvarez
- In office January 24, 2001 – June 30, 2001
- Preceded by: Arnulfo Fuentebella
- Succeeded by: Jose de Venecia Jr.

Member of the Philippine House of Representatives from Quezon City's 4th district
- In office June 30, 2010 – June 30, 2019
- Preceded by: Nanette Castelo-Daza
- Succeeded by: Bong Suntay
- In office June 30, 1992 – June 30, 2001
- Preceded by: Ismael A. Mathay Jr.
- Succeeded by: Nanette Castelo-Daza

10th Mayor of Quezon City
- In office June 30, 2001 – June 30, 2010
- Vice Mayor: Herbert Bautista
- Preceded by: Ismael A. Mathay Jr.
- Succeeded by: Herbert Bautista

President & General Manager of the Government Services Insurance System
- In office 1986–1991
- Appointed by: Corazon C. Aquino
- Preceded by: Roman A. Cruz Jr.
- Succeeded by: Daniel C. Lacson Jr.

Personal details
- Born: Fernando Feliciano Racimo Belmonte Jr. October 2, 1936 (age 89) Tondo, Manila, Philippine Commonwealth
- Party: Independent (2018–present)
- Other political affiliations: Liberal (2009–2018); Lakas (1992–2009)
- Spouse: Billie Mary Go (m. 1959; died 1994)
- Relations: Jose Christopher Belmonte (nephew); Dennis Belmonte (brother)
- Children: 4 (including Joy)
- Education: Lyceum of the Philippines University (LL.B)
- Profession: Lawyer

Fernando Feliciano "Sonny" Racimo Belmonte Jr., KGCR (born October 2, 1936) is a Filipino politician and a lawyer who served as the 20th and 23rd speaker of the House of Representatives of the Philippines from January to June 2001 and from 2010 to 2016. As a Congressman, Belmonte represented Quezon City's 4th congressional district from 1992 to 2001 and 2010 to 2019. Between his two stints in Congress, Belmonte served as the tenth mayor of Quezon City.

== Early life and career ==
Belmonte was born at 1:35 p.m. on October 2, 1936, at Emmanuel Community Hospital in Tondo, Manila, to judge Feliciano Belmonte Sr. and Luz Racimo. Belmonte began studying at age seven, spending his early education in Zaragoza, Nueva Ecija, the hometown of his father. He also attended grade school in Baguio and earned his high school diploma at the San Beda University in Manila. He finished Law at the Lyceum of the Philippines University; while in law school, he worked as a reporter at the Manila Chronicle, covering the police beat and events at the Philippine Commission on Elections.

At age 25, Belmonte began his law career after taking the bar examination, which he passed with a score of 85.55 percent. He began his government service as the presidential staff assistant of President Diosdado Macapagal. He also worked as a special assistant for the Commissioner of Customs, and as an executive assistant at the Bangko Sentral ng Pilipinas. In 1986, President Corazon Aquino assigned him to head various financially struggling government-owned corporations. He became president and General Manager of the Government Service Insurance System (GSIS) and the Manila Hotel and chairman of the National Reinsurance Corporation of the Philippines. He also represented the government as member of the board of directors of the San Miguel Corporation and the Philippine Long Distance Telephone Company (PLDT). He assumed the position of president and chief executive officer of Philippine Airlines, which was then wholly owned by the Philippine government.

== House of Representatives (1992–2001) ==
Belmonte was first elected as member of the House of Representatives from Quezon City's fourth congressional district. He held the seat for three consecutive terms, from 1992 to 2001. Belmonte briefly served as the speaker of the House of Representatives in 2001, and also served as House Minority Leader. In his first two terms, he served as the vice chairman of the Committee on Appropriations.

During his term, Belmonte authored and co-authored several major bills, including the General Appropriations Act, the Act Providing for a Dual System of Education, the Act Creating the Metropolitan Manila Development Authority, and the Salary Standardization Law.

Although largely concerned with budget and financial matters, Belmonte also did work for the low-salaried employees, and was instrumental in the passage of the Second Salary Standardization Law (SSL 2), which corrected the gross inequities of SSL 1. He also pushed for the continued implementation of the Personal Economic Relief Alliance (PERA) for low-salaried government personnel.

=== Speaker of the House (2001) ===
Belmonte gained national prominence as the lead prosecutor in the impeachment trial of President Joseph Estrada. On January 20, 2001, during the EDSA Revolution of 2001, Estrada left the Malacañan Palace and Vice President Gloria Macapagal Arroyo was sworn to the presidency at the EDSA Shrine by Chief Justice Hilario Davide Jr. Accompanying Davide were the chairs of the two houses of Congress, Aquilino Pimentel Jr. and Fuentebella. Four days later, on January 24, the Arroyo allies mustered enough votes to unseat Fuentebella, replacing him with Belmonte.

== Mayor of Quezon City (2001–2010) ==
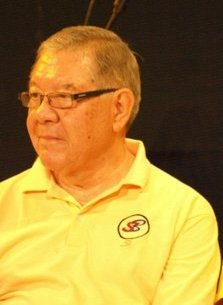
Belmonte at a miting de avance in 2010 during his term as mayor of Quezon City

On August 4, 2000, Belmonte announced his intention to run for mayor of Quezon City. In 2001, he won the election for the position of mayor and was re-elected in 2004 and in 2007, with vice mayor Herbert Bautista as his running mate in each election. As mayor, his nine years of prudent fiscal management, aggressive tax management strategies, as well as increasing efficiency and growing discipline in the management, and use of City resources has made Quezon City the most competitive city of Metro Manila, and second in the Philippines today. These are rankings made by businessmen in the Philippines in studies of the Asian Institute of Management, in cooperation with international agencies.

Quezon City was cited for the dynamism of its local economy, the quality of life of its residents, and the responsiveness of the local government in addressing business and other needs.

In 2007, Quezon City was ranked No. 7 Asian City of the Future, based on a survey commissioned by the London Financial Times, through a consultancy based in Singapore. In a 2008 Tholons special report on global services, Quezon City ranked as the number 21 emerging global outsourcing city, the highest among all nine new entrants.

Belmonte was a long-standing member of the Lakas–CMD and Lakas–Kampi–CMD parties from his first term in Congress in 1992 until November 2009, where he last held the position of senior vice president for externals. On November 19, 2009, he and Vice Mayor Bautista were sworn in as members of the opposition Liberal Party.

== House of Representatives (2010–2019) ==
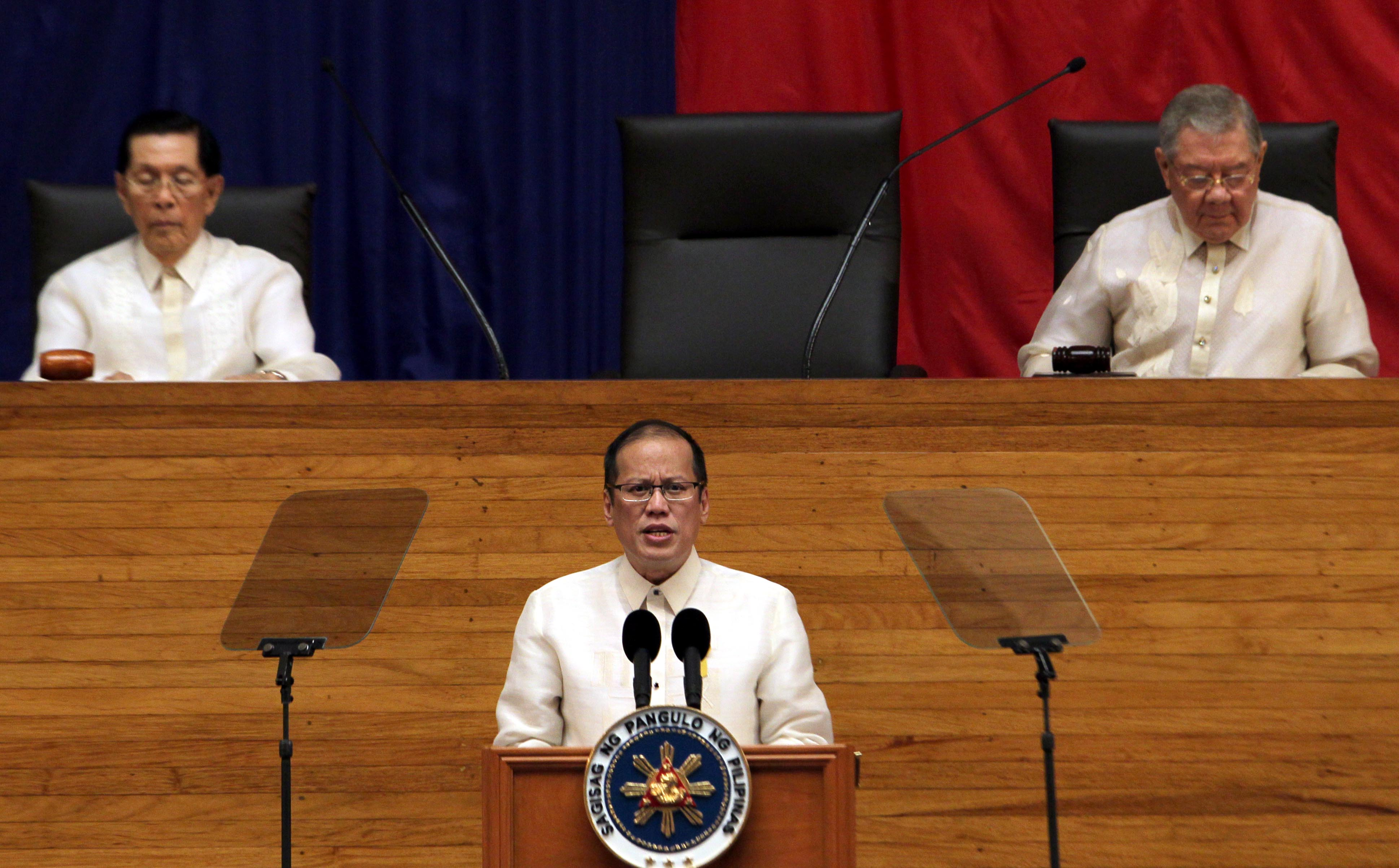
Belmonte (top right) during President Benigno Aquino III's 2015 State of the Nation Address

After serving as mayor of Quezon City, Belmonte made a successful bid for a fourth term in the House of Representatives. At the opening of the 15th Congress, Belmonte was again elected as speaker of the House, defeating Edcel Lagman of the former ruling party Lakas Kampi CMD, with a vote of 227–29. He succeeded Prospero Nograles, whose term had ended almost a month earlier. He was re-elected as representative in 2013 and in 2016.

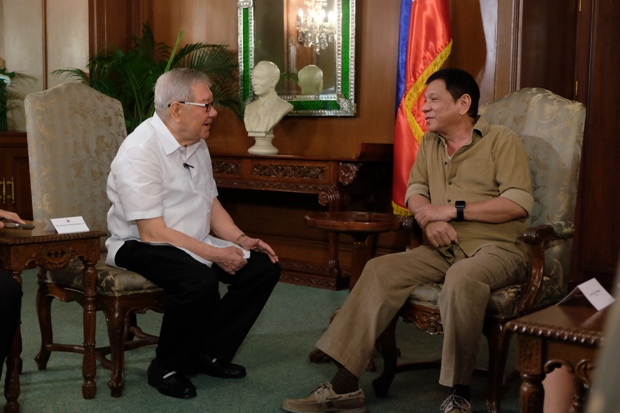
Belmonte (left) meets with President Rodrigo Duterte (right) at Malacañang in 2016

In 2016, having been re-elected to his third consecutive term as representative, Belmonte decided not to seek another term as Speaker for the incoming 17th Congress and instead supported the bid of Pantaleon Alvarez, the representative-elect of Davao del Norte's 1st district and member of the incoming ruling party PDP–Laban. Alvarez eventually clinched the speakership, succeeding him.

In 2018, Belmonte left the Liberal Party, where he served as its vice chairman, as he would be retiring from politics at the end of his term. Belmonte ended his congressional term on June 30, 2019, and was succeeded by councilor Bong Suntay, who ran under his daughter Joy's ticket.

== Personal life ==
Belmonte was a member of the Manila Jaycees, the Rotary Club of Manila and the Knights of Rizal. He was also Junior Chamber International World President in 1976.

He married Betty Go-Belmonte (1934–1994), founder of The Philippine Star, in 1959. They have raised four children: Isaac, Kevin, Miguel and Joy. Their three sons have also held editorial and managerial positions at the Philippine Star and its sister publications like Pilipino Star Ngayon and Pang-Masa tabloids published in the Filipino vernacular, as well as the Cebu-based newspaper The Freeman. His daughter, Joy, has served as mayor of Quezon City since 2019. Belmonte also has a nephew, Kit, who served as a representative from Quezon City's 6th congressional district from 2013 to 2022.

House of Representatives of the Philippines
Preceded by Ismael A. Mathay Jr.	Representative, 4th district of Quezon City; 1992–2001	Succeeded by Nanette Castelo-Daza
Preceded by Nanette Castelo-Daza	Representative, 4th district of Quezon City; 2010–2019	Succeeded by Bong Suntay
Political offices
Preceded by Arnulfo Fuentebella	Speaker of the House of Representatives; 2001	Succeeded by Jose de Venecia Jr.
Preceded by Ismael A. Mathay Jr.	Mayor of Quezon City; 2001–2010	Succeeded by Herbert Bautista
Preceded by Prospero Nograles	Speaker of the House of Representatives; 2010–2016	Succeeded by Pantaleon Alvarez
