= List of hotels in the Philippines =

The following is a list of notable hotels in the Philippines.

== Luzon ==
- Thunderbird Resorts

== Visayas ==
=== Boracay ===
- Boracay Eco Village
- Hotel 101 Resorts-Boracay (proposed)

=== Cebu ===
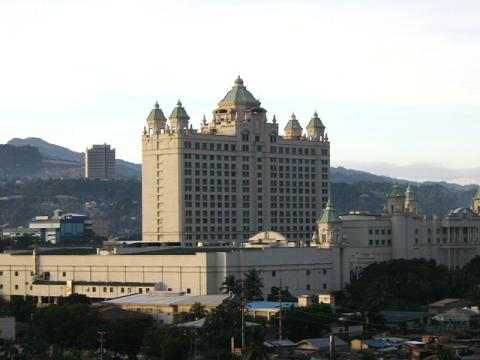
Waterfront Cebu City Hotel & Casino

- Crown Regency Hotel and Towers
- Marco Polo Plaza Cebu
- Maxwell Hotel Cebu
- Shangri-La's Mactan Resort & Spa, Cebu
- Waterfront Cebu City Hotel & Casino

=== Iloilo ===
- Injap Tower Hotel

== Mindanao ==
=== Cagayan de Oro ===
- Maxandrea Hotel

=== Davao City ===
- Marco Polo Davao (1998–2020)

== Nationwide chains ==
- Hotel Sogo

== See also ==
- Tourism in the Philippines
- Lists of hotels
