= List of hotels in Metro Manila =

This is a list of hotels in Metro Manila. The list includes both current and historic hotels.

== Current hotels ==
Current hotels in Metro Manila
Name	Image	Location	Rooms	Opened	Notes	Ref
Century Park Hotel		Malate	478	1976	Formerly the Century Park Sheraton Manila	
Conrad Manila		Bay City	350	2015	The first Conrad Hotels & Resorts branded property in the Philippines	
Crowne Plaza Manila Galleria		Ortigas Center	263	2005		
Discovery Primea		Makati CBD	141	2014	Luxury serviced residences in Makati CBD	
Dusit Thani Manila		Makati CBD	538	1976		
Edsa Shangri-La		Ortigas Center	631	1992	formerly known as Edsa Plaza Hotel	
Grand Hyatt Manila		Bonifacio Global City	438	2018	Occupies the top floors of the Metrobank Center	
Holiday Inn Manila		Ortigas Center		1990	Part of the Robinsons Galleria complex	
Hilton Manila		Newport City	402	2017		
Hyatt Regency Hotel		Bay City	365	2014	Part of the City of Dreams Manila complex and second resort-casino to rise in Entertainment City	
Makati Shangri-La		Makati CBD	696	1993	Located on the site of the former Rizal Theater which is demolished in 1990	
Manila Hotel		Ermita	570	1912	The oldest premiere hotel in the Philippines	
Manila Marriott		Newport City	342	2009	One of the 3 hotels to rise in Resorts World Manila	
Manila Peninsula		Makati CBD	543	1976	Site of the Manila Peninsula rebellion in 2007	
Marco Polo Ortigas Manila		Ortigas Center	316	2014	The first Marco Polo hotel in Manila	
Midas Hotel and Casino		Bay City	227	1971		
New Coast Hotel Manila		Malate	512	2014	Former Hyatt Regency Hotel & Casino Manila and New World Manila Bay Hotel	
Novotel Manila		Araneta Center	401	2015	The largest hotel in Quezon City	
Okada Manila		Bay City	993	2016	Third and largest resort-casino to rise in Entertainment City	
Raffles Makati		Makati CBD	115	2012		
Rizal Park Hotel		Ermita	107	2017	Occupies the former building of the Manila Army and Navy Club	
Seda Vertis North		Triangle Park	438	2017		
Shangri-La at the Fort		Bonifacio Global City	576	2016	Third hotel to rise in Bonifacio Global City	
Sofitel Manila		Bay City	609	1976	Formerly Known as Philippine Plaza Hotel and Westin Philippine Plaza under Starwood Hotels in the Cultural Center of the Philippines Complex	
Solaire Resort & Casino		Bay City	488	2012	First resort-casino to rise in Entertainment City	

== Former hotels ==
- InterContinental Manila
- Mandarin Oriental Manila
- Philippine Village Hotel
- Sofitel Grand Boulevard Hotel

== Other hotels in Metro Manila ==
Listed here are current, former and under construction hotels within Metro Manila:

- Luneta Hotel
- Nobu Hotel City of Dreams Manila
- Nuwa Hotel City of Dreams Manila
- Manila Marriott Hotel
- Belmont Hotel Manila
- Hilton Manila
- Maxims Hotel
- Hotel Okura Manila
- Savoy Hotel
- Sheraton Manila

== See also ==
- List of hotels in the Philippines
- Lists of hotels – an index of hotel list articles on Wikipedia
