= Capital of the Philippines =

Capital cities of the Philippines from 1595

This is an overview of current and former national capital cities in the Philippines, spanning from the Spanish colonial period to the current Fifth Philippine Republic. The current capital city, Manila, has been the country's capital throughout most of its history and regained the title through a presidential order in 1976, with its metropolitan area serving as the National Capital Region (NCR) since 1978.

== Historical background ==
On April 7, 1521 Ferdinand Magellan landed in Cebu. He was welcomed by Rajah Humabon, who, together with his wife and about 800 natives, were baptized by the Spaniards on April 14, 1521, and are considered to be the first Filipino Catholics. Magellan, however, failed to successfully claim the Philippines for the crown of Spain, having been slain in neighboring Mactan Island by Datu Lapulapu.

A Spanish expedition ordered by the conquistador Miguel Lopez de Legazpi demanded the conquest of Manila. His second-in-command, Martín de Goiti departed from Cebu and arrived in Manila. The Muslim Tagalogs welcomed the foreigners, but Goiti had other plans. The Spanish force of 300 soldiers marched through Manila and a battle was fought with the heavily armed Spaniards quickly defeating and crushing the native settlements to the ground. Legazpi and his men followed the next year and made a peace pact with the three rajahs and organized a city council consisting of two mayors, 12 councilors, and a secretary.

A walled city known as Intramuros, at the southern banks of Pasig River was built to protect the Spanish colonizers. On June 10, 1574, King Philip II of Spain gave Manila the title of Insigne y Siempre Leal Ciudad ("Distinguished and Ever Loyal City"). In 1595, Manila was proclaimed as the capital of the Philippine Islands and became a center of the trans-Pacific silver trade for more than three centuries.

When the British captured Manila during the Seven Years' War, they temporarily transferred the capital to Bacolor, Pampanga, and moved back to Manila after the signing of the 1763 Treaty of Paris.

The Spanish-American War erupted in 1898 and the Philippine Revolution that had begun in 1896 reignited. The Spanish surrendered Manila to the Americans after the 1898 Battle of Manila. The town of Malolos in the province of Bulacan became the headquarters of the revolutionary army and the capital of the revolutionary Firet Philippine Republic in 1899. Several other towns became successive capitals aa the core of the revolutionary government fled to avoid capture by the Americans during the Philippine–American War. The status of the national capital moved back to Manila after the capture of President Emilio Aguinaldo in 1901.

=== 1905 Burnham Plan of Manila ===
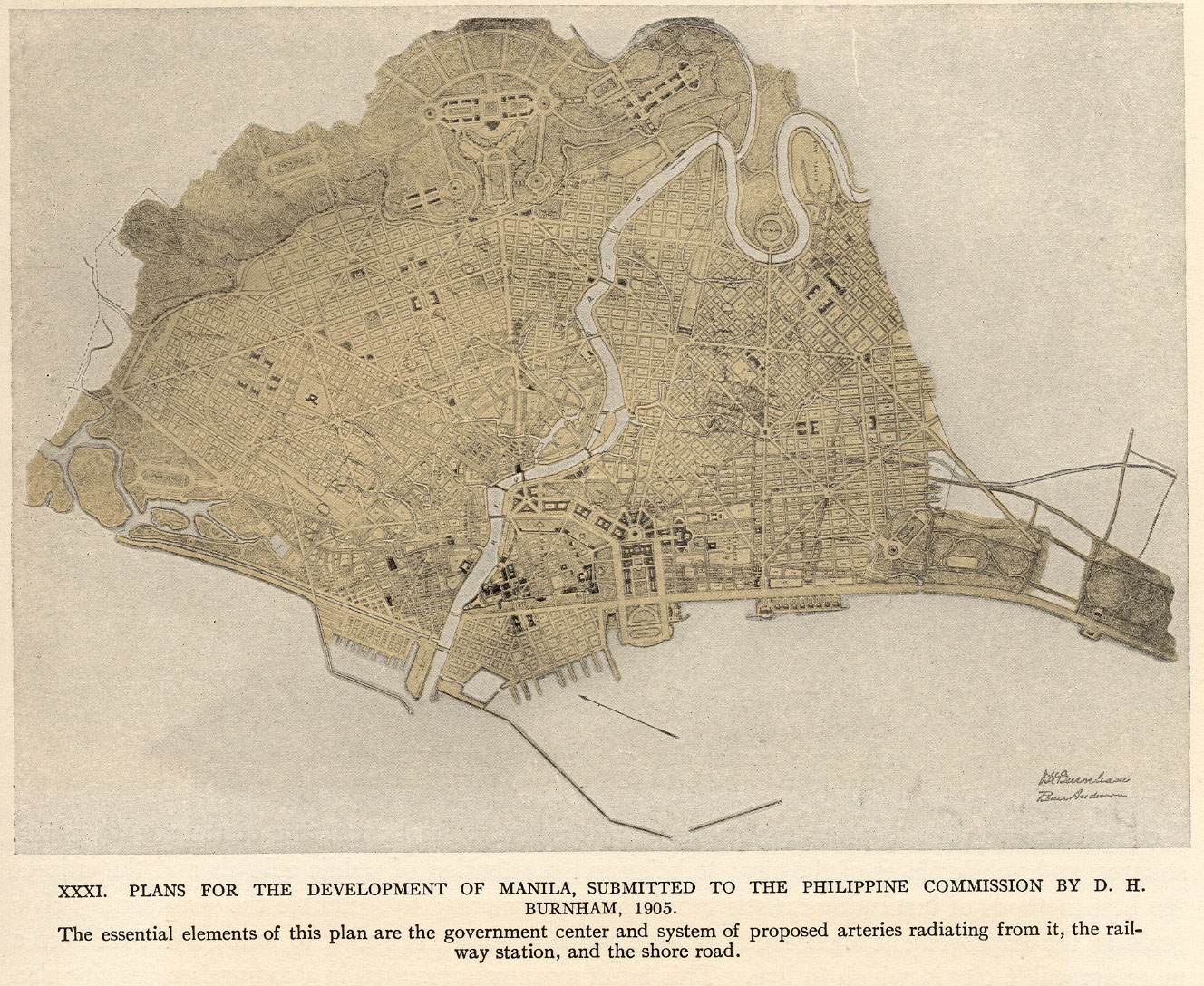
Burnham Plan of Manila

When the Americans came they decided that Intramuros was not big enough, nor appropriate for their new colony. They called in the famous architect and planner, Daniel Burnham, one of the proponents of City Beautiful movement, to design the new capital. This he did in grand fashion using Washington D.C. as a model. The national civic center was placed outside the old walls in the open field called Bagumbayan. Burnham planned a large capitol building surrounded by supporting government offices in a formal setting that was close to a mirror image of Washington's. The National Mall is now our Luneta, or Rizal Park. Only the Agriculture and Finance Buildings were built of the original civic group. The National Library was also built in the 1920s but turned into the Legislative Building in lieu of the Capitol that could not get built because of budgetary cuts. Governor General Francis Burton Harrison used funds intended for the Burnham Plan to build an Executive Building in Malacañang Palace. Improvement proposed by Burnham includes waterfront parks and parkways; the city's street system; construction of buildings, waterways, and summer resorts.

Burnham proposed a parkway along Manila bay extending from the Luneta southward all the way to Cavite. This was to be a 250’ wide boulevard – with roadways, tramways, bridle paths, rich plantations, and broad sidewalks and should be made available to all classes of people. Burnham further recommended shaded drives along the Pasig all the way to Ft. McKinley, which we now know as Fort Bonifacio, and beyond as part of the park and parkway system. Burnham ended his report by the following words:

Possessing the bay of Naples, the winding river of Paris, and the canals of Venice, Manila has before it an opportunity unique in the history of modern times, the opportunity to create a unified city equal to the greatest of the Western World with the unparalleled and priceless addition of a tropical setting ...

—Daniel Burnham

By 1928 a major revision of the plan was undertaken. A committee led by Manuel Mañosa Sr. and Juan Arellano produced a Zoning Plan for Manila based on the original Burnham Plan. This was printed and distributed free to the public for feedback. The final drawings and documents were recommended for approval in 1933 and eventually became the basis for Manila's first zoning ordinances.

Burnham's Manila plan was prepared for a city with a maximum population of 800,000 people. The population of the city of Manila was only 285,000 in 1918, but it grew at 5.6 percent per year to more than 600,000 in 1939. At that rate, Manila would have been filled to capacity.

But then in the 1930s just as the Commonwealth government had finally built the Burnham Plan's seaside drive – named Dewey Boulevard and finally finished the Post Office Building, the Finance and Agriculture Buildings, it decided to scrap the Burnham Plan and replace it with a new metropolis elsewhere. One of the main reasons given was that the proposed National Capitol to be built in the vicinity of the present-day Rizal Park was too susceptible to naval bombardment.

After Burham left, William Parsons became Consulting Architect of the Philippine Commission. Among Parsons' accomplishments in Manila were the Philippine General Hospital, the Manila Hotel, the Manila Army and Navy Club, and the Philippine Normal University

=== 1941 Frost-Arellano Plan of Quezon City ===
During the time of the Commonwealth, Manila still served as the nation's capital. During these times too that Commonwealth President Manuel L. Quezon dreamed of a city that could become the future capital of the country, replacing Manila. In the summer of 1939 President Quezon contacted William Parsons and asked him to choose a new site for and then to design a new Philippine capital. Parsons arrived in June 1939 and eventually chose Diliman as the new capital site. He also managed to produce a master plan for the new University of the Philippines. He died in December of that year. Harry Frost, Parsons' former partner took over and joined Juan Arellano and A. D. Williams in the Planning Commission. A fourth member of the team, landscape architect Louis P. Croft joined them as advisor on planning and park design. They were commissioned to produce a master plan for Quezon City; this was approved in 1941.

The elliptical circle was the focal point of a grand quadrangle defined by the geographically named avenues and reached by a grand boulevard connecting it to the very center of old Manila via Quezon Bridge. The circle was to house the new legislative complex, a magnificent group of buildings with the halls of Senate and the House. Executive Mansion or Presidential palace to its left (currently occupied by the Veterans Memorial Medical Center) and the Supreme Court complex to its right (the current site of East Avenue Medical Center). All of these complexes were set in landscaped sites and surrounded by public parks and open spaces. The new National Capital City complex was thus defined with the three branches of government connected and framed by the Diliman Quadrangle. The portion of Batasan Hills was reserved for the campus of Philippine Military Academy.

The elliptical circle was turned to a memorial to Quezon. The 400 hectares (990 acres) of the Diliman quadrangle was allocated by the commission as the city's central park. This central park was to contain the national botanic garden, the national zoo, athletic grounds, a grand stadium and even a golf course. The park was to be the main component of a comprehensive citywide park and parkway system. This system would have included another 400-hectare (990-acre) in the north, various parks and greenbelts along creeks and rivers, numerous playgrounds and athletic fields. A 46-hectare (110-acre) area presently occupied by SM North EDSA was proposed to be the location of the National Exposition Grounds which was originally intended to host the 1946 World's fair, adjacent to it is the proposed Scientific Government Center. The transfer of the main campus of the University of the Philippines was also part of the master plan, as well as the planning of housing projects and business and industrial hubs. Finally, there was to be a major greenbelt all along the Marikina and San Mateo valley – to contain urban sprawl, preserve the agricultural land and protect the city's watershed areas. None of the intended parks and parkway system was ever built.

During the Japanese-sponsored Second Philippine Republic and throughout World War II, the City of Greater Manila, established in 1941 combining Manila and adjacent municipalities, still served as the nation's capital. However Baguio serve as the temporary capital of government in exile and the site where General Tomoyuki Yamashita and Vice Admiral Okochi surrendered.

Quezon died in exile during the war years. After the war, Quezon City was put back on track as capital of an independent republic. In 1945, President Sergio Osmeña, who had taken over when Quezon died, organized the Quezon Memorial Committee (QMC) to raise funds for a memorial.

In 1946 newly elected President Manuel Roxas created a Capital Site Committee to look at other possible sites. The old capitol site was not deemed defensible enough from military attack nor the area large enough to accommodate a projected population of several million people. Sixteen other sites were evaluated. The committee was formed to look at 16 alternatives to Novaliches. These included, among others: Tagaytay, Cebu, Davao, San Pablo, Baguio, Los Baños, Montalban, Antipolo, and Fort McKinley. The committee even considered moving the capital to Boracay Island but the raised elevation of Novaliches was finally chosen. The original Diliman area was thus enlarged to include the Novaliches watershed to the North all the way to Wack Wack in the south. In essence, the Frost Plan was revived under the National Planning Commission first headed by Croft then later by Harvard-trained Anselmo Alquinto. The plan was revised in 1947, 1949 and finally in 1956.

In 1949, the civic center under these revisions was to be moved northeast from the elliptical circle to a 158-hectare (390-acre) area called Constitution Hill. The three branches of government and support offices were laid in a formal layout. In the middle was to be a 20-hectare (49-acre) Plaza of the Republic. In the middle right of the plaza was the proposed capitol housing the Congress of the Philippines; the proposed Palace of the Chief Executive that would replace Malacañang Palace as the official residence of the president at its left; and an area allotted for the Supreme Court and other constitutional bodies. The whole complex was to be connected to Manila by an east–west parkway called Republic Avenue where a War Heroes Memorial was planned to be located.. That plan was submitted and approved by President Quirino but it would take close to thirty years before the Batasan Pambansa was completed in 1978.

=== Transfer of Nation's Capital to Manila and Designation of Metro Manila as Seat of Government ===
During President Ferdinand Marcos' period of Bagong Lipunan (New Society), Quezon City's stature of being the country's capital was transferred to Manila and the whole of Metro Manila was designated as the seat of government on June 24, 1976, by Presidential Decree No. 940. President Marcos also considered an alternative site for the national capital. A joint study was conducted by the architecture and planning offices of Cesar Concio and Felipe Mendoza, comparing the original Novaliches site and a newly reclaimed stretch of land south of the new Cultural Center of the Philippines, but the Novaliches was still chosen for the proposed capital.

In the 1970s, President Marcos proposed that the national government center would be in Tagaytay, and it was expected that businesses and groups that depended on the government would relocate to the new seat. Two decades later, in 1995, when President Ramos proposed the location of the government center to be at Fort Bonifacio, the name would be Aguinaldo, which is named after the country's first president. While the idea was to be located south of Manila, on a 5000-hectare area, a river should tarverse the city; proximity to the sea or lake would be desirable; travel time to the nearest airport to have more than 60 minutes; this will also avoid any major fault line, having no buildings and rise high enough to reach 600 feet, which would make the city green; and a national park would feature a network of smaller parks, gardens, and malls. While Gloria Macapagal Arroyo proposed that the nation's capital to move to Cebu City.

Manila remains the country's capital city, but the administrative and political centers of the national government are spread throughout Metro Manila, with the Executive (Malacañang Palace) and the Judiciary (Supreme Court) both in Manila. while the legislative branch is located in two separate locations: the House of Representatives in Quezon City and the Senate in Pasay. The Senate eventually moved to Fort Bonifacio in Taguig by 2025, while the New Supreme Court Building also followed suit.

=== Other capitals ===
Baguio was formerly designated as the "summer capital" of the country from 1903 to 1976. A presidential mansion is within the city limits, and the Supreme Court still holds their April–May summer sessions at Baguio. Presidential Decree No. 940 of 1976 made no mention of Baguio continuing to serve as the "summer capital", but the city still holds the distinction in an unofficial capacity.

== Chronology ==
Capital and Seats of Government of the Philippines
Location	Island Group	Since	Until	Duration	Description
Spanish East Indies
Cebu	Visayas	1565	1569	4 years	Miguel Lopez de Legazpi established the first Spanish settlement in the archipelago.
Iloilo (Panay Island)	Visayas	1569	1571	2 years	Second Spanish settlement. Established as a capital before the conquest of Manila.
Manila	Luzon	1571	1762	191 years	Served as the seat of the Spanish colonial government in the Philippines
Bacolor, Pampanga	Luzon	1762	1764	2 years	Temporary capital of the Spanish colonial government during the British occupation of Manila.
Manila	Luzon	1764	1896	132 years	Served as the seat of the Spanish colonial government in the Philippines
Iloilo, Panay Island	Visayas	1898	1899	1 year	After the Fall of Manila, the Governor-General Diego de los Ríos tried to revive the colonial government in Iloilo until the Spanish forces surrendered to the Americans.
Revolutionary Period
San Francisco de Malabon, Cavite	Luzon	March 1897	November 1897	8 months	Seat of the Tejeros Revolutionary Republic
San Miguel, Bulacan	Luzon	November 1897	April 1898	5 months	Served as the capital of the short lived Republic of Biak-na-Bato
Cavite El Viejo	Luzon	June 1898	July 1898	30 days	Hometown of General Emilio Aguinaldo, where independence was proclaimed during the Philippine Revolution.
Bacoor, Cavite	Luzon	July 1898	September 1898	3 months	Served as the seat of the Revolutionary Government
Malolos, Bulacan	Luzon	1898	1899	6 months	Served as the Official Capital of the Republican government during the Philippine–American War.
San Isidro, Nueva Ecija	Luzon	1899	1899	9 months	After the Americans besieged Malolos on March 31, 1899, Aguinaldo transferred his headquarters in several towns in attempt to escape from American forces and continue his revolution.
Angeles, Pampanga	Luzon	1899	1899	9 months	After the Americans besieged Malolos on March 31, 1899, Aguinaldo transferred his headquarters in several towns in attempt to escape from American forces and continue his revolution.
Cabanatuan, Nueva Ecija	Luzon	1899	1899	9 months	After the Americans besieged Malolos on March 31, 1899, Aguinaldo transferred his headquarters in several towns in attempt to escape from American forces and continue his revolution.
Bamban, Tarlac	Luzon	1899	1899	9 months	After the Americans besieged Malolos on March 31, 1899, Aguinaldo transferred his headquarters in several towns in attempt to escape from American forces and continue his revolution.
Tarlac City, Tarlac	Luzon	1899	1899	9 months	After the Americans besieged Malolos on March 31, 1899, Aguinaldo transferred his headquarters in several towns in attempt to escape from American forces and continue his revolution.
Bayombong, Nueva Vizcaya	Luzon	1899	1899	9 months	After the Americans besieged Malolos on March 31, 1899, Aguinaldo transferred his headquarters in several towns in attempt to escape from American forces and continue his revolution.
Bayambang, Pangasinan	Luzon	1899	1899	9 months	After the Americans besieged Malolos on March 31, 1899, Aguinaldo transferred his headquarters in several towns in attempt to escape from American forces and continue his revolution.
Lubuagan, Kalinga	Luzon	March 6, 1900	May 18, 1900	73 days	Aguinaldo established headquarters in Lubuagan for 73 days before fleeing to Palanan
Palanan, Isabela	Luzon	1900	1901	9 months	Aguinaldo's last hideout until he was captured by the forces of Frederick Funston and surrendered to the Americans.
Insular Government of the Philippine Islands
Manila	Luzon	1898	1941	43 years	Served as the seat of government during the direct U.S. military government and civil government periods and during the Philippine Commonwealth until the 1941 outbreak of World War II. in 1901, the capital engulfed the nearby municipalities of Ermita, Tondo, Santa Cruz, Santa Ana de Sapa, San Nicolas, San Miguel, San Fernando de Dilao, the Port Area, Pandacan, Sampaloc, Quiapo, Binondo, Malate, San Andres, and Santa Mesa to form Metro Manila.
Commonwealth of the Philippines
Corregidor Island	Luzon	1941	1942	1 year	Temporary headquarters of the Commonwealth government-in-exile led by President Manuel L. Quezon when the Japanese forces invaded Manila.
Washington D.C.	United States	1942	1944	2 years	Temporary headquarters of the Commonwealth government-in-exile led by President Manuel L. Quezon when the Japanese forces invaded Manila.
Tacloban	Eastern Visayas	1944	1945	1 year	Landing site of General Douglas MacArthur and Allied forces during the final stages of World War II. Served as the temporary headquarters of the Commonwealth led by President Sergio Osmeña until liberation.
Second Philippine Republic
Manila	Luzon	1941	1944	3 years	Served as the seat of government during the Japanese occupation and the Japanese-sponsored Second Republic of José P. Laurel. Part of the City of Greater Manila.
Baguio	Luzon	1944	1945	1 year	After the Battle of Manila, the headquarters of the Second Republic was moved to Baguio until Laurel announced its dissolution in Tokyo.
Nara/Tokyo	Japan	1944	1945	1 year	After the Battle of Manila, the headquarters of the Second Republic was moved to Baguio until Laurel announced its dissolution in Tokyo.
Republic of the Philippines
Manila	Luzon	1945	1948	3 years	Became the capital of the newly independent Third Republic.
Quezon City	Luzon	1948	1976	28 years	By virtue of Republic Act No. 333 by Elpidio Quirino.
National Capital Region (seat of government); Manila (country's capital city)	Luzon	1976	present		Issued by Ferdinand Marcos on June 24, 1976, Presidential Decree No. 940 designated Manila as the capital city of the Philippines and the whole of Metro Manila as seat of government. Metro Manila had been created on November 7, 1974, by Presidential Decree No. 824 by incorporating the city of Manila, Quezon City, Pasay, Caloocan, several municipalities from Rizal, and one from Bulacan to form a metropolitan area.

== Other former declared capitals ==
Capital	State	Present-day area	From	To	Description
Bacolod	Republic of Negros	Negros	1898	1901	The city was declared the capital after the Negros Revolution.
Zamboanga City	Republic of Zamboanga	Zamboanga Peninsula	1898	1901	The area encompasses the whole Zamboanga Peninsula and claimed the whole Mindanao as its territory.
Iloilo City	Federal State of the Visayas	Western Visayas Central Visayas Romblon	1898	1899	The Cantonal governments of Bohol and Negros, and Cebu, as well as the Provisional Government in the Visayas which exercised powers over Panay and Romblon, formed the Federal State of the Visayas on December 2, 1898, to promote federalism in the Philippines. Roque Lopez who was the president of the provisional government in Panay became the federal state's president and Iloilo City was designated as the Visayas capital.
Butuan	Rajahnate of Butuan	Northeast Mindanao	1001	1756	Butuan first enters written records when the Rajah named Kiling sent tribute to the Song dynasty Emperor of China at 1001 AD.
Singhapala (currently Cebu City)	Rajahnate of Cebu	Cebu	800 A.D.	1565	Cebu was established by Tamil descended Rajah named Sri Lumay. Rajah Tupas was the last leader of an independent Cebu until its conquest by Spain.
Sinugbohan (currently San Joaquin, Iloilo); Malandog (currently Hamtic, Antique); Batan (currently Kalibo, Aklan); Irong-Irong (currently Iloilo City)	Kedatuan of Madja-as	Panay	1200	1570	The establishment of the Spanish settlement in Oton and conquest of Panay effectively extinguished the confederation.
Tagbilaran	Kedatuan of Dapitan	Bohol	1100s	1563	The Kedatuan of Dapitan existed in Bohol from the 1100s until its destruction by the Papuan Sultanate of Ternate, then Dapitan refugees re-established Dapitan in northern Mindanao.
Marawi	Confederation of sultanates in Lanao	Lanao del Sur	1640	1889	At 1640, Balindong Bsar established the Confederation of the Sultanates of Lanao until its annexation by America in 1899.
Kuta Wato (currently Cotabato City)	Sultanate of Maguindanao	Maguindanao	1500	1888	The sultanate encompasses the current Soccsksargen region and Maguindanao province.
Astana Putih (currently Jolo, Sulu)	Sultanate of Sulu	Sulu	1405	1915	The Sultanate of Sulu was independent until 1915.
Tondo	Tondo Dynasty	Metropolitan Manila	c. 900 CE	1500	The kingdom of Tundun or Tondo established as a fortified city at the mouth of Pasig river making it as a capital even before 900 AD (based on the LCI), in 1500 the Bruneian Empire invasion of Lusung made Manila the capital of the Kingdom of Maynila thereby replacing Tondo in importance due to the Lakan of Tondo having lost the Battle of Manila.
Manila	Kingdom of Manila	Metropolitan Manila	1500	1570	The destruction of Fort Seludong and the establishment of Intramuros ended the rule of local Muslim rulers and ushered the Spanish era.

== Proposed capitals ==
Due to overpopulation, traffic congestion, and high vulnerability to natural disasters in the current capital various lawmakers have suggested to shift the capital of the Philippines. In 1999, the government proposed the Government Center for Investments Complex, which is part of the development of Bonifacio Global City and would have a cluster of four state-of-the-art medium-rise buildings that would become a one-stop shop for businesses and investors.

In May 2012, Quezon City councilor Francisco Calalay Jr. urged Congress to consider shifting the capital to Quezon City. In February 2016, Australian businessman Peter Wallace suggested Subic–Clark as the next Philippine capital. In November 2016, some officials proposed for the shifting of national government offices, and later the official capital, to the center of Negros Island. In February 2017, a panel was formed by the House of Representatives explore the possibility of shifting the country's capital. In March 2017, the House Speaker stated that the capital of the Philippines should be "somewhere in Negros island". In January 2018, two congressmen filed a bill proposing to shift the country's capital to Davao City, while suggesting that Malacañang Palace in Manila should remain the president's official residence. In August 2019, a senator filed a bill proposing that the seat of government should transfer to New Clark City, located in Capas, Tarlac, by 2030.
