= Luneta Hotel =

Historic French Renaissance hotel in Manila, Philippines

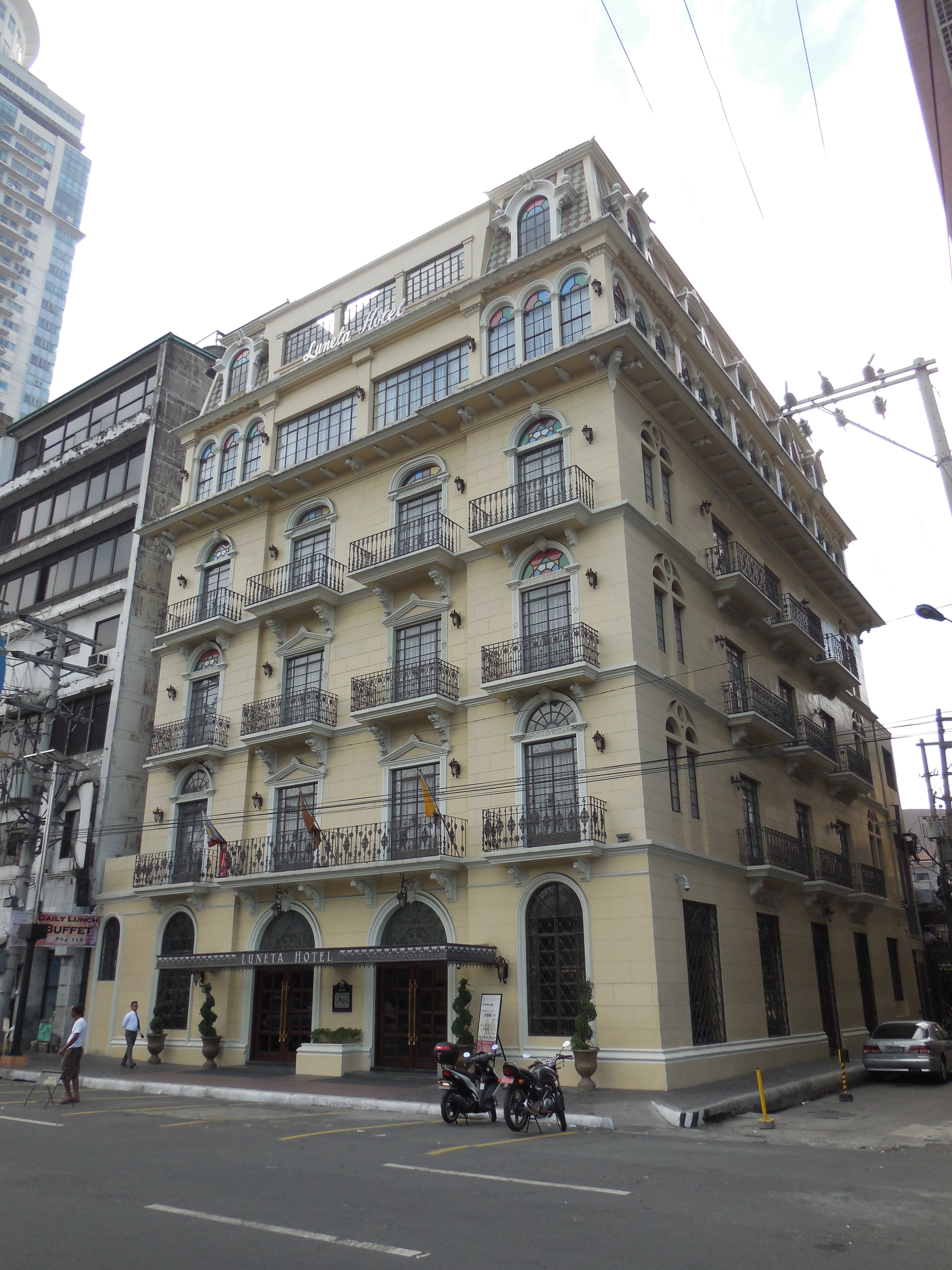
- The façade of Luneta Hotel

- Location within Metro Manila

General information
- Status: Completed
- Architectural style: French Renaissance
- Location: Kalaw Avenue, Ermita, Manila, Philippines
- Coordinates: 14.5798°N 120.9781°E
- Completed: 1919
- Closed: 1987 reopened in 2014

Technical details
- Floor count: 6

Design and construction
- Architect: Salvador Farre

Website
- www.thelunetahotelmanila.com

National Historical Landmarks
- Official name: Luneta Hotel on T. M. Kalaw Street, Ermita Manila
- Type: Hotel
- Designated: May 6, 1998; 27 years ago
- Legal basis: Resolution No. 1, s. 1998
- Region: National Capital Region
- Marker date: May 9, 2014; 11 years ago

The Luneta Hotel is a historic hotel in Manila, Philippines. Named after its location across from Luneta (Rizal Park) on Kalaw Avenue in Ermita, it is one of the remaining structures that survived the Liberation of Manila in 1945. The hotel was completed in 1919. According to the study by Dean Joseph Fernandez of the University of Santo Tomas, the hotel was designed by the Spanish architect-engineer Salvador Farre. The structure is the only remaining example of French Renaissance architecture with Filipino stylized beaux arts in the Philippines to date. After being closed down and abandoned in 1987, the hotel was relaunched in May 2014.

== History ==
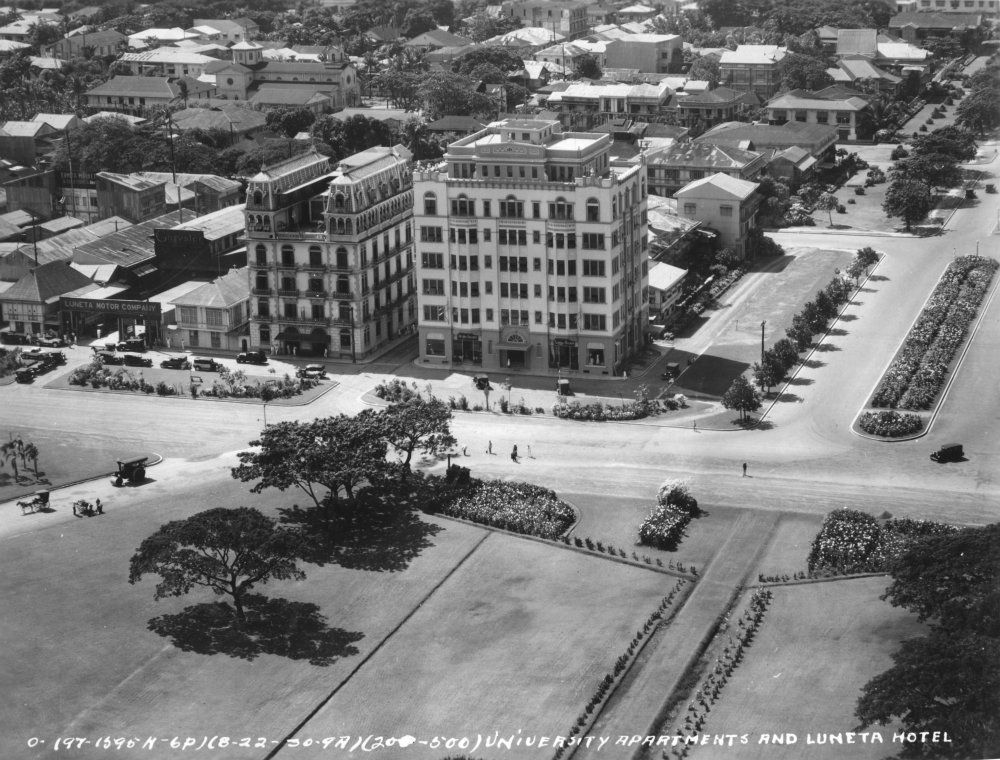
Aerial photo of the Luneta hotel in 1930, to the left of the no-longer existing University Apartments

The hotel was designed by the Spanish architect-engineer Salvador Farre in French Renaissance Belle Epoque style and completed in 1919.

Initially, the hotel was run by its owner L. Burchfield and general manager F.M. Lozano. Being near the Port of Manila, the hotel was popular with Navy officers and sailors of the Merchant Marines. It gained international fame due to hosting the delegates for the 33rd International Eucharistic Congress, held at Luneta Park, the first International Eucharistic Congress in Asia.

== Architecture ==
Designed by Spanish architect Salvador Farre, the Luneta Hotel on Kalaw Avenue was built in 1919. It symbolized the new influence that the Americans brought to the country. As once described by cultural writer and conservationist Bambi Harper wrote about its architecture.

President Dwight Eisenhower wrote about the Luneta Hotel's beauty:

This Luneta was for more than 4 years the scene of my habitual evening walks. To this day it lives in memory as one of the most pleasant, indeed even one of the most romantic spots, I have known in this entire world. Leaving the front entrance of the Luneta Hotel in the evening, I could walk to the right to view the busy docks where Philippine commerce with the world was loaded and unloaded. From the hotel, looking across the peaceful waters of Manila Bay, I could see the gorgeous sunsets over Miravales. Walking toward the Club of the Army and the Navy, and looking down toward the city itself, I nearly always paused for a moment before the statue of the great José Rizal before returning to my quarters.

== See also ==
- List of hotels in Manila
