= Burnham Plan of Manila =

1905 city plan of Manila, Philippines

Report on proposed improvements at Manila
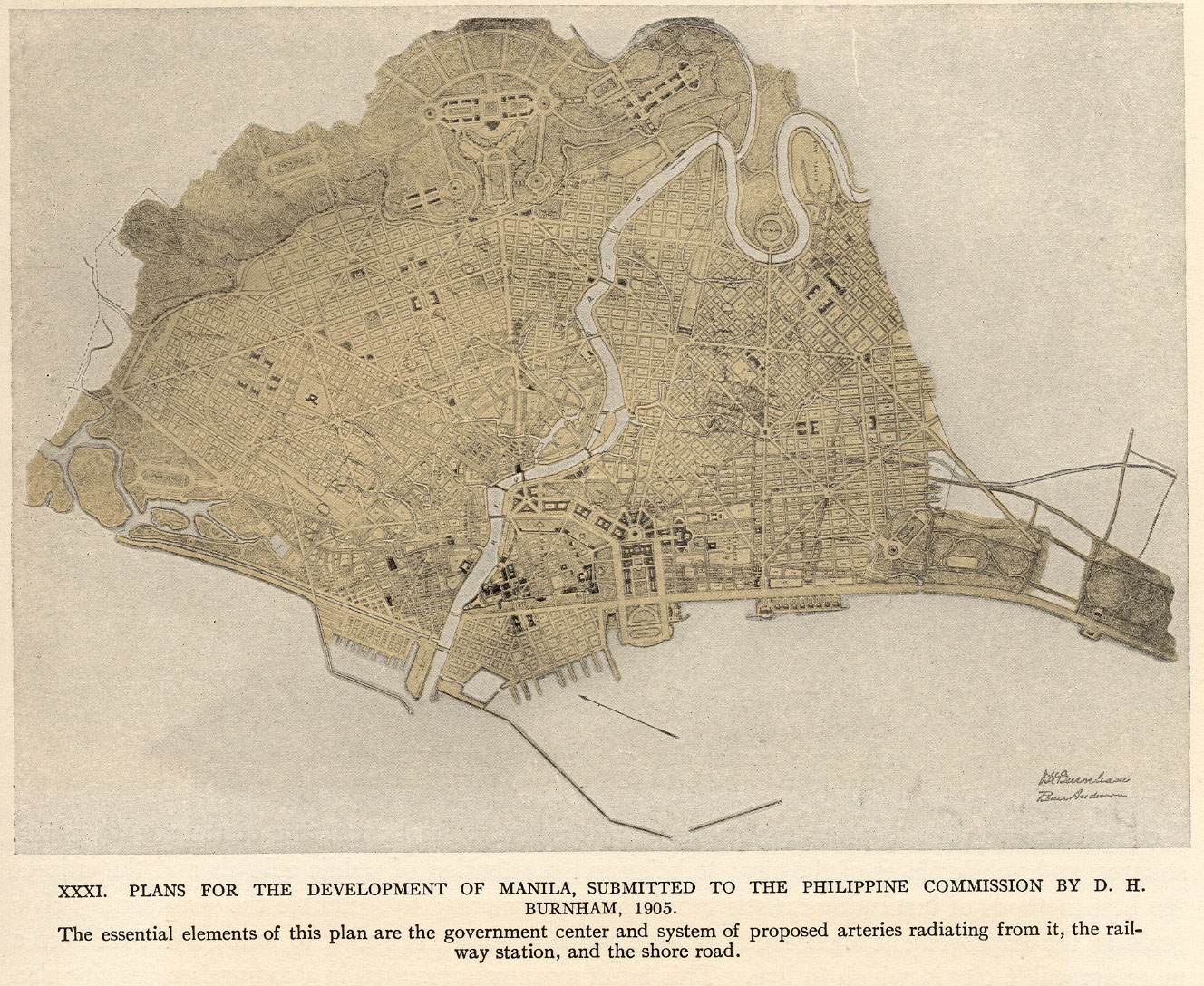
- Created: June 28, 1905
- Commissioned by: William Howard Taft
- Author(s): Daniel Burnham; Pierce Anderson
- Subject: City planning

The Burnham Plan of Manila is a popular name for the Report on proposed improvements at Manila and Manila, P.I., coauthored by Daniel Burnham and Pierce Anderson in 1905. The report proposed a variety of projects to expand, modernize, and beautify the city of Manila, then under American rule, including new districts, boulevards, parks, and harbor facilities.

The plan was requested by then Philippine Governor-General William Howard Taft, four years before Burnham published the better known Plan of Chicago, which also appeared alongside plans for Washington, D.C., Cleveland, and San Francisco. The plan was partially carried out, most notably by architects William E. Parsons and Juan M. Arellano. However, the plan's implementation was effectively ended by the establishment of a new capital at Quezon City in 1939 and, later, the effects of World War II, including the merging of Manila with nearby cities to form Greater Manila in 1942 and the Battle of Manila in 1945. Efforts to revive the implementation of the plan have occurred over the years, and the plan remains a subject of discussions in urban planning in the Philippines.

== Background ==
At the turn of the 20th century, the Philippines was conquered by the United States from Spain, along with Cuba, Puerto Rico, and Guam. The American colonial government aimed to modernize the capital city and the mountain city of Baguio, designated as the summer capital.

William Howard Taft suggested to Philippine Commission member William Cameron Forbes that a landscape architect be hired for the task. Forbes initially considered Frederick Law Olmsted, Jr., but Olmstead was unavailable, and the job was eventually given to Daniel Burnham. Other architects who expressed interest included Charles Follen McKim.

Burnham, along with designer Pierce Anderson, arrived in Manila on December 7, 1904, and studied the layout and environment of Manila and Baguio for almost a month, mostly in the company of Cameron Forbes, who had by then become Governor-General. Burnham's interaction with local Filipinos on the trip was minimal. The two then returned to the United States, where Burnham drew up the plans for both cities in slightly under six months, completing them by June 1905. The U.S. Congress approved the plan a year later. The speedy drafting and approval of the plan can be contrasted with Burnham's later Plan of Chicago, which took two years and a staff of dozens to produce before its publication, notwithstanding a lifetime of research and work in Chicago on Burnham's part.

In 1905, Manila had a population of about 225,000. Burnham planned for a much-expanded city of 800,000. He took his examples as Paris and imperial Rome, and envisioned the construction of secular, civic landscapes built in his characteristic neoclassical style. Through the plazas and boulevards he planned, Burnham hoped to counteract the segregation of Philippine natives, colonizers, Chinese, and others, which was endemic in Spanish Manila due to the Laws of the Indies. However, many of the grandest spaces he planned were de jure or de facto for the exclusive use of Americans during the colonial period.

== Aspects of the plan ==
The plan focused on five major points:

=== Development of Waterfront, Parks, and Parkways ===
The plan suggested utilizing the city's resources, such as the river and ocean bay, for recreation and refreshment to mitigate Manila's intense heat.

A key aspect of the proposal was the creation of a continuous parkway along the bay front, extending from the existing Luneta to Cavite, and possibly further north. Private portions of the bay front were to be reclaimed for public use. The boulevard included roadways, tramways, a bridle path, plantings, and sidewalks, with palms, bamboo, and mango trees providing shade and enhancing the ocean view. Shaded drives along the Pasig River, extending from the city to Fort McKinley and beyond to the lake, were also proposed.

The existing Luneta was to be replaced by a new Luneta placed further out in the bay, preserving its unobstructed view of the sea while enclosing the other three sides with trees. Small park spaces were planned throughout the city, including plazas, circles, esplanades, and parkway boulevards, with nine larger parks evenly distributed to connect areas for outdoor activity.

The plan suggested incorporating water elements in Manila's parks, inspired by Rome's use of fountains and water features. These could include decorative fountains, reflecting pools, and small cascades. Water features would serve both aesthetic and practical purposes, adding tranquility and beauty to the parks while mitigating heat. The sound and sight of flowing water was hoped to create a calming atmosphere, and the evaporation of water would help cool the surrounding air, providing relief from high temperatures.

=== Updated street system ===
The plan aimed to modify the old town while keeping most street arrangements intact. It emphasized early action to avoid rising costs and recommended starting with new street lines and opening others gradually.

The plan also proposed preserving Intramuros’ old walls, creating openings through the bastions for roadways, and filling the moat to create sunken green spaces.

The outer districts of the city were to be provided with a street system that avoids a north-south or east-west orientation, instead favoring a fan-shaped grouping of radiating streets and diagonal arteries for direct communication. The plan also suggested wider avenues with park-like connections and ample shade. The overall goal was to leave the old city streets untouched, improve the setting of the old walls, and create a street system that ensures sunlight, accessibility, and efficient traffic flow. The importance of future needs and the example of Washington, D.C., were highlighted as reasons for the proposed plan's scale and foresight.

=== Location of building sites ===
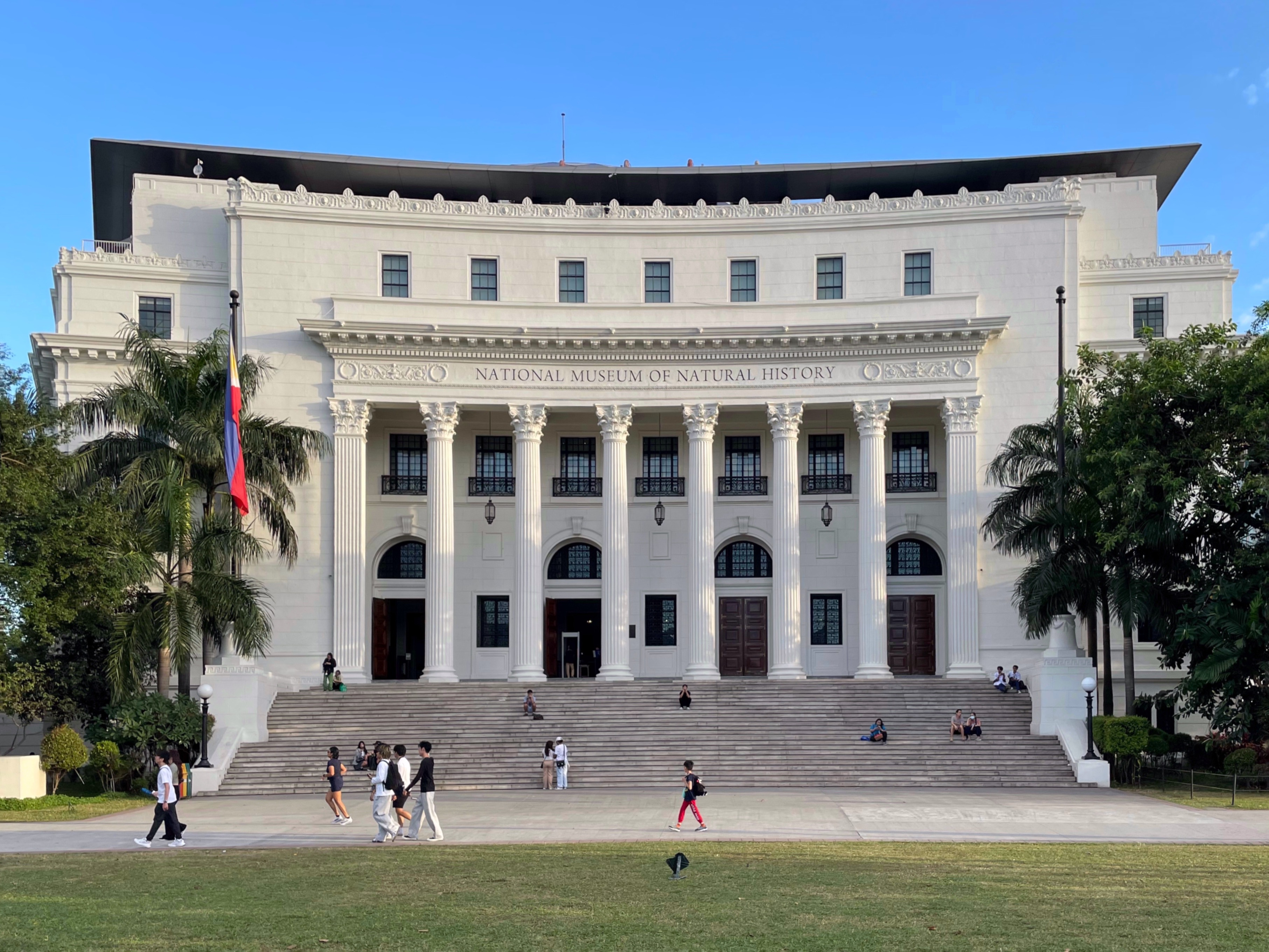
The National Museum of Natural History building previously housed the Department of Agriculture and Commerce.

The Government or National Group, which was to include the Capitol Building and Department Buildings, would be located on the present Camp Wallace and adjacent land behind Calle Nozelada. The buildings were arranged in a hollow square formation, opening westward toward the sea. The eastern front of the Capitol would a semi-circular plaza, which would serve as a central hub connecting the street system to all parts of the city, ensuring the Capitol, the symbol of the nation's power and the center of government activities, was easily accessible from all sides.

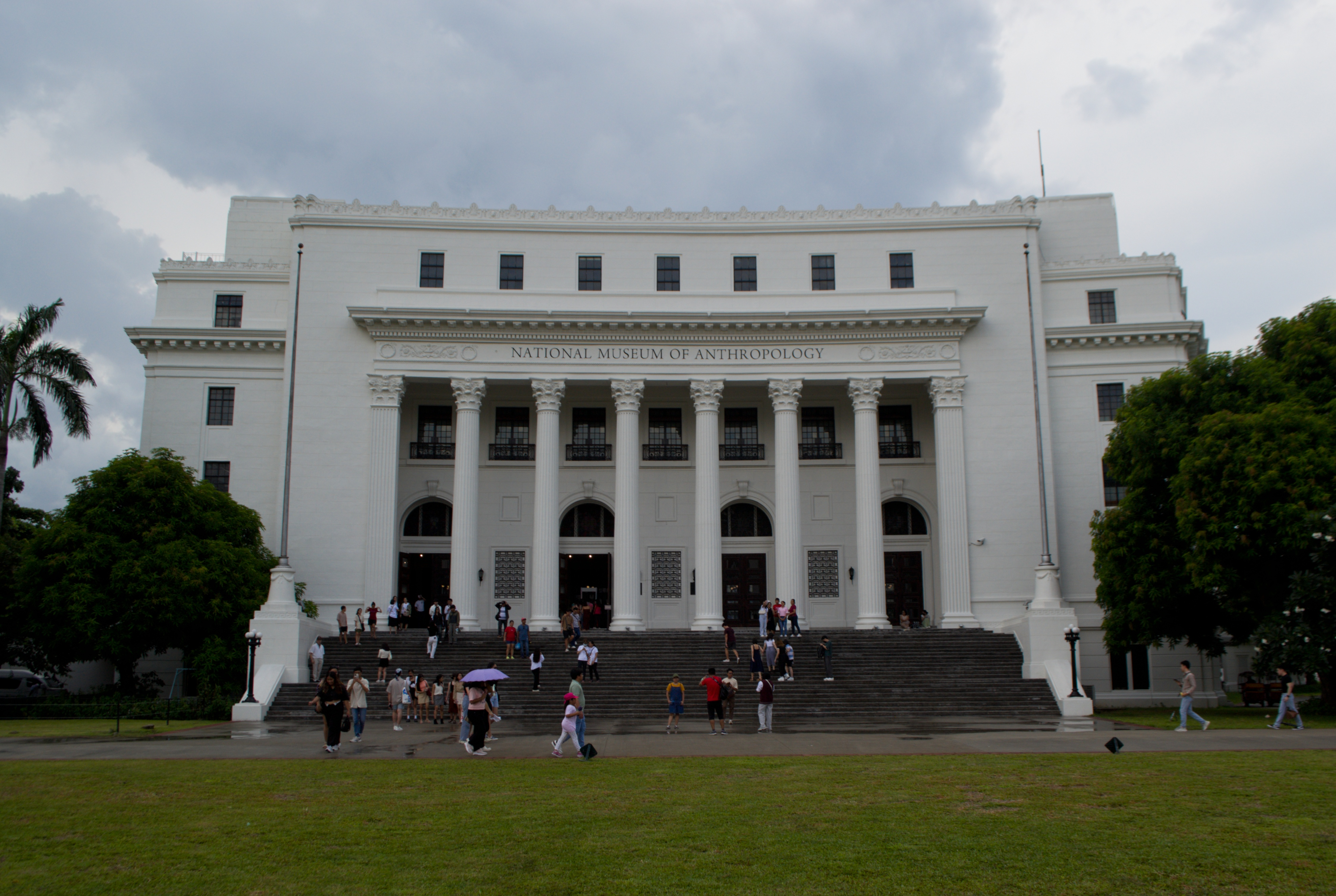
The National Museum of Anthropology

Placed south of the main group was the Courthouse. To the north, along Malecón Drive leading to the Bridge of Spain, were areas allocated for semi-public buildings such as libraries, museums, and permanent exposition buildings. Behind these buildings were proposed athletic fields. The road ends in a central circle with three important bridges over the Pasig River. The Post Office was relocated south of its current temporary site, requiring riverfront access for easy mail transportation.

A proposed passenger railway station, centrally located in Greater Manila, was to be connected to the Government center through one of the radiating arteries. Its planned location took advantage of the bend in the Pasig River, allowing for the development of a terminal property without causing significant disruptions to traffic.

The Municipal Group was to be around Plaza McKinley, enlarging the plaza by adding the block occupied by the then-ruinous Palacio del Gobernador. This group, which included the Ayuntamiento and the proposed Custom House, Board of Trade, and Commercial Museum, would extend to the waterfront where a special pier was proposed as the main water gate of Manila.

The Governor-General's residence was suggested to be located on the bay outside the boulevard on newly made land, facing an esplanade that extends through the Malate military reservation. The passage also suggested a series of city clubs south of the Governor-General's residence, a country club south of the city limits, and a hotel near Luneta Park. Santa Mesa Heights was considered suitable for schools or a university, while the high ground north and east of the city was suggested for parks and other semi-public institutions.

=== Development of water transportation ===
The plan highlighted the importance of preserving and developing the estero system, despite their initial unfavorable conditions, as they were considered valuable for transportation purposes. It suggested widening, dredging, and providing masonry banks for the esteros to enhance their usefulness for freight handling. The development of estero connections was also proposed to reduce the risk of river overflow.

The plan also discussed the need for railroad facilities to support a new port. It suggested two options for the railroad approach: one from the north side, which already existed but requires bridging the Pasig River, and another from the south side, which would cut through the city and require elevated tracks. The plan argued that a drawbridge over the Pasig River would be a more feasible option despite potential hindrances to navigation and reduced river frontage value. It further mentioned the possibility of an additional harbor north of the river to accommodate the new port, which would require extending the existing channel.

Additionally, the plan emphasized the aesthetic and practical benefits of establishing shaded drives and open quays along the riverbanks, as well as the public use of these areas.

=== Summer resorts ===
Manila required accessible summer resorts on high ground due to its climate. The plan suggested nearby options, including the low hills east of Manila, the mountains of Mariveles, and the hill country around Laguna de Bay. These locations provided government employees and their families with a change of air without extensive travel.

== Implementation and legacy ==
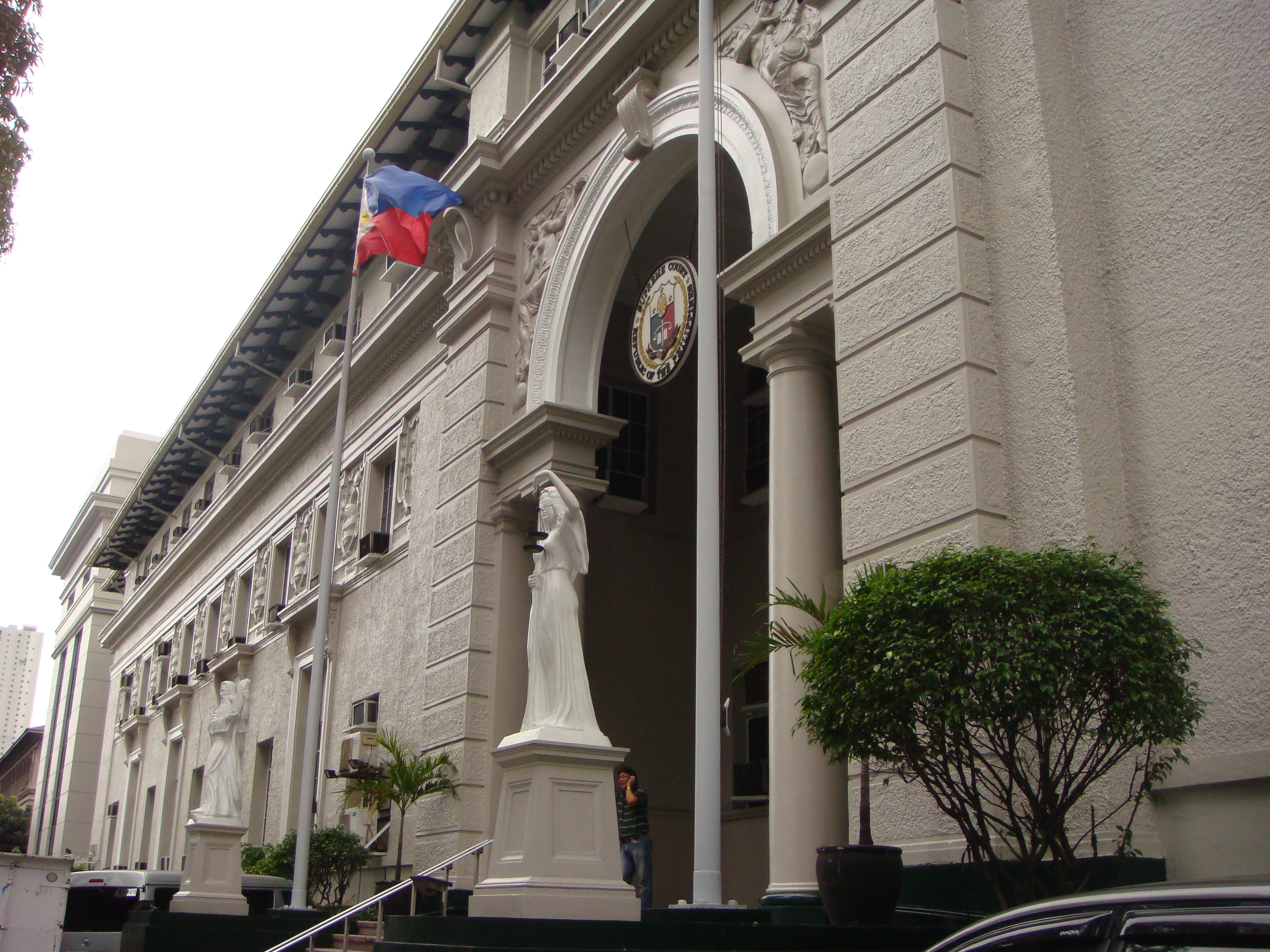
The Supreme Court of the Philippines is currently house in the old building of the University of the Philippines, Manila.

Unlike Burnham's plans for American cities, which were often stymied by local political opposition, the undemocratic nature of American rule in the Philippines gave Burnham and his fellow planners greater liberty to implement the report's findings swiftly.

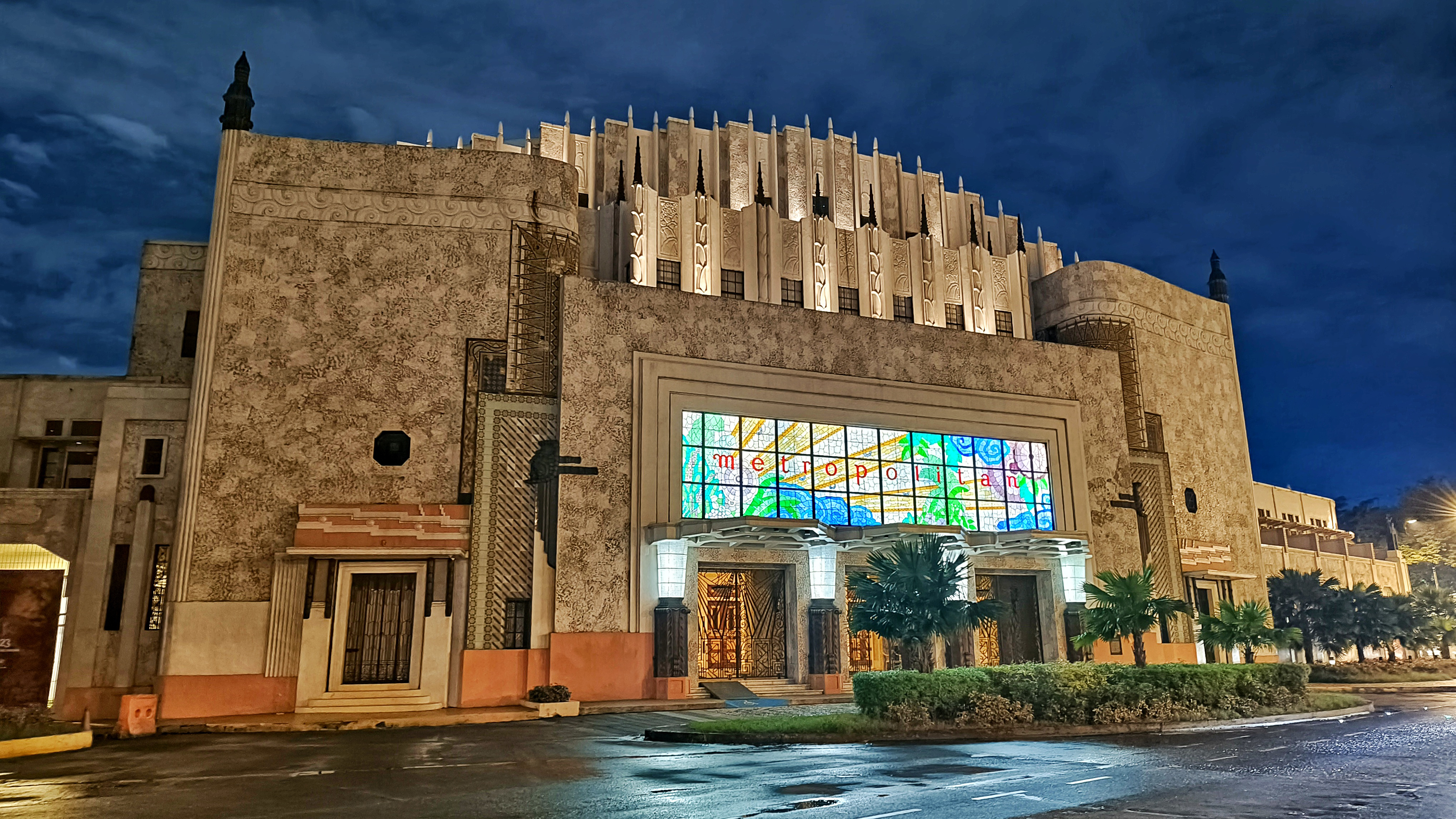
Metropolitan Theater

The implementation of Burnham's plan began with his personal selection of American architect William E. Parsons to serve as the first Consulting Architect of the Philippines. Parsons was giving wide-ranging powers over planning across the Philippines: he was charged with responsibility "for all public buildings, whether insular, municipal, or provincial".

The implementation was initially characterized by significant progress under Parsons, who, as an École des Beaux-Arts graduate, meticulously began translating the plan's vision after it was submitted. Some prominent structures erected by Parsons in accordance with the Burnham Plan include the (whites-only) Army and Navy Club and Elks Club, the Manila Hotel, the YMCA of Manila, the main building of the Philippine Normal School, the University Hall of the University of the Philippines (now the Department of Justice building), the Philippine General Hospital, and Paco Station. While their plans were distinctly western, Burnham and Parsons strove to build the plan in a style sensitive to the conditions and tastes of the Philippines; many of Parsons' buildings were built in a combination of the Spanish colonial and Philippine vernacular styles, distinctly less formal than their works in the metropole.

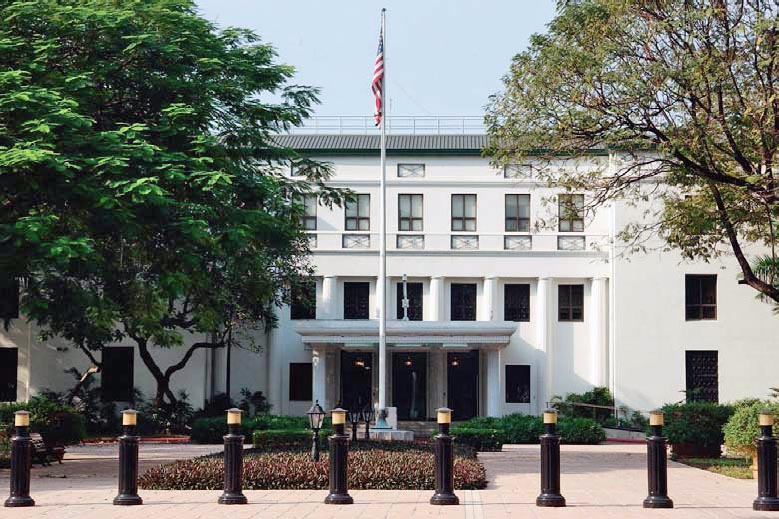
The United States chancery in Manila

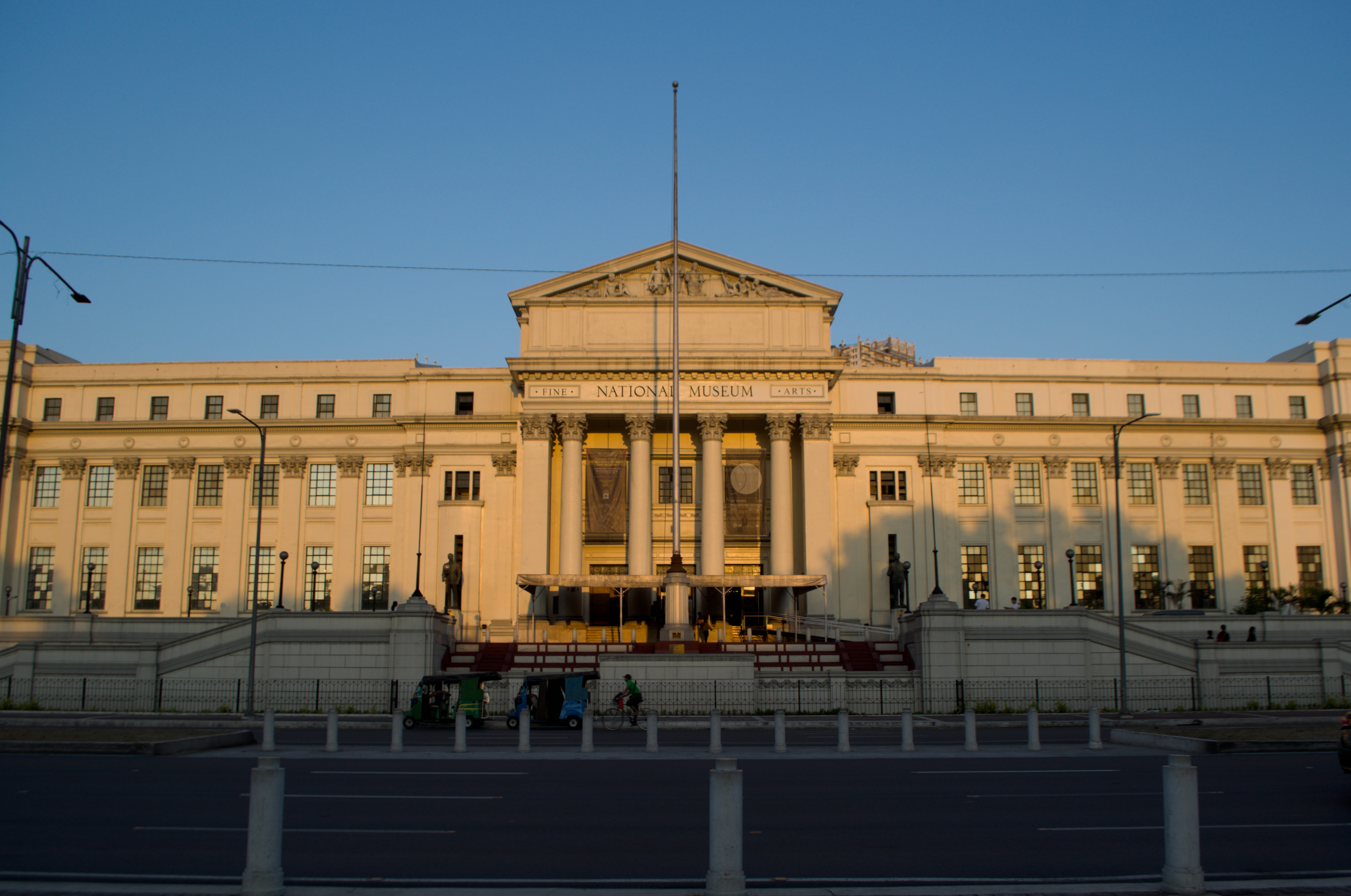
National Museum of Fine Arts in the old Legislative building.

After the process of "Filipinisation" was initiated under the presidency of Woodrow Wilson, implementation of the plan gradually fell more and more to Filipino architects and planners. The most prominent of these was Juan M. Arellano, whose contributions toward the completion of the plan include the Legislative Building, Jones Bridge, the Central Post Office, the Office of the American High Commissioner, the Metropolitan Theater, and the Mehan Garden. Arellano was eventually appointed as Consulting Architect. Arellano's early work was in a strict neoclassical style, contrasting with the Plan's first structures built under Parsons. Long after the Burnham Plan ceased to be Manila's principal planning document, Arellano would express regret at his insistence on the use of neoclassicism for his Burnham Plan buildings, such as the Legislative Building, over styles he judged to be more authentically "Philippine".

A key success was the establishment of the central civic core. This included the enlargement of the Luneta (now Rizal Park) and the construction of the grand waterfront esplanade that became Roxas Boulevard (formerly Dewey Boulevard), designed to connect the city to Manila Bay. The implementation also included the crucial environmental improvement of filling the "toxic moat" that encircled the old Walled City of Intramuros. The core tangible realization of the plan's aesthetic was the completion of three major Neoclassical government structures in the planned center: the Legislative Building, the Finance Building, and the Agricultural Building.

The full realization of the plan was ultimately hindered by political and financial hurdles. The initial momentum and sustained financing necessary for such a large-scale project failed. A major blow was the formal political abandonment of Manila as the primary seat of government when Quezon City was established as the new national capital in 1939.

Finally, the few monumental structures that had been successfully built were severely damaged or destroyed during the Battle of Manila in 1945, halting any further progress and forcing post-war reconstruction to diverge from the original blueprint.

Despite the incomplete implementation of the plan, Burnham and his American colleagues reveled in the liberty with which they were able to remake the city. Thomas Hines, writing in 1972, identified Manila as the "greatest architectural success" of the City Beautiful movement.

== See also ==
- Burnham Plan of Chicago
- Frost Plan of Quezon City
- City Beautiful movement
