= Marco Polo Hotels =

Hong Kong hotel management company

Marco Polo Hotels 馬哥孛羅酒店集團
- Company type: Public company
- Industry: Hotel chain
- Founded: 1986
- Headquarters: Hong Kong, China
- Area served: Hong Kong, China, Indonesia, Malaysia, Philippines, Singapore, Taiwan, Thailand
- Parent: The Wharf (Holdings)
- Website: www.marcopolohotels.com

Marco Polo Hotels (Chinese: 馬哥孛羅酒店集團) is a hotel management company based in Hong Kong that operates hotels in Hong Kong, Mainland China and the Philippines. It is a wholly owned subsidiary of Wharf (Holdings) Limited. The company's chairman is chairman and managing director of Wharf (Holdings) Limited.

== History ==
Wharf's first hotel venture was the Hong Kong Hotel (not to be confused with the much earlier Hongkong Hotel), opened in 1970, which was a joint venture with Hongkong Land, Hui Sai-fun and Chung Ming-fai.

The hotel was built on land immediately adjacent to Wharf's Kowloon Wharf & Godown Co. Ltd property along the western shore of the Tsim Sha Tsui promontory. In 1982, Wharf completed redevelopment of its site as the Harbour City (Hong Kong) complex and opened its first wholly owned hotel there that year, the 440-room Marco Polo Hotel (later renamed Omni Marco Polo and finally Gateway). In 1984, the 393-room Prince Hotel (a reincarnation of the unrelated hotel situated on the corner of Argyle Street and Prince Edward Road West, Kowloon, until the 1970s) was added in the same complex.

All three hotels were managed by The Peninsula Hotels in Hong Kong, a subsidiary of Hongkong and Shanghai Hotels, at one point, but in 1986, Wharf started its own hotel management company under the name Marco Polo International, with the objective to develop further hotels in the region.

In 1989, Wharf bought Omni Hotels & Resorts in North America. The Marco Polo hotel division was rebranded as Omni Hotels Asia-Pacific, creating global marketing synergies with the Omni brand, hence its three hotels became the Omni Hong Kong Hotel, Omni Marco Polo Hotel and Omni Prince Hotel. In 1996, Wharf sold Omni Hotels North America and the Hong Kong hotel division was again rebranded, the Marco Polo Hotels Group. Later, the Marco Polo Hotel was renamed the Gateway Hotel and the Hong Kong Hotel became the Marco Polo Hongkong Hotel. In 2013, through another subsidiary, Wharf won a tender to lease and convert the HKSAR Government's Murray Building in Central, Hong Kong Island, to a 336-room hotel and it opened in 2017, named The Murray, Hong Kong, a Niccolo Hotel.

== Properties ==
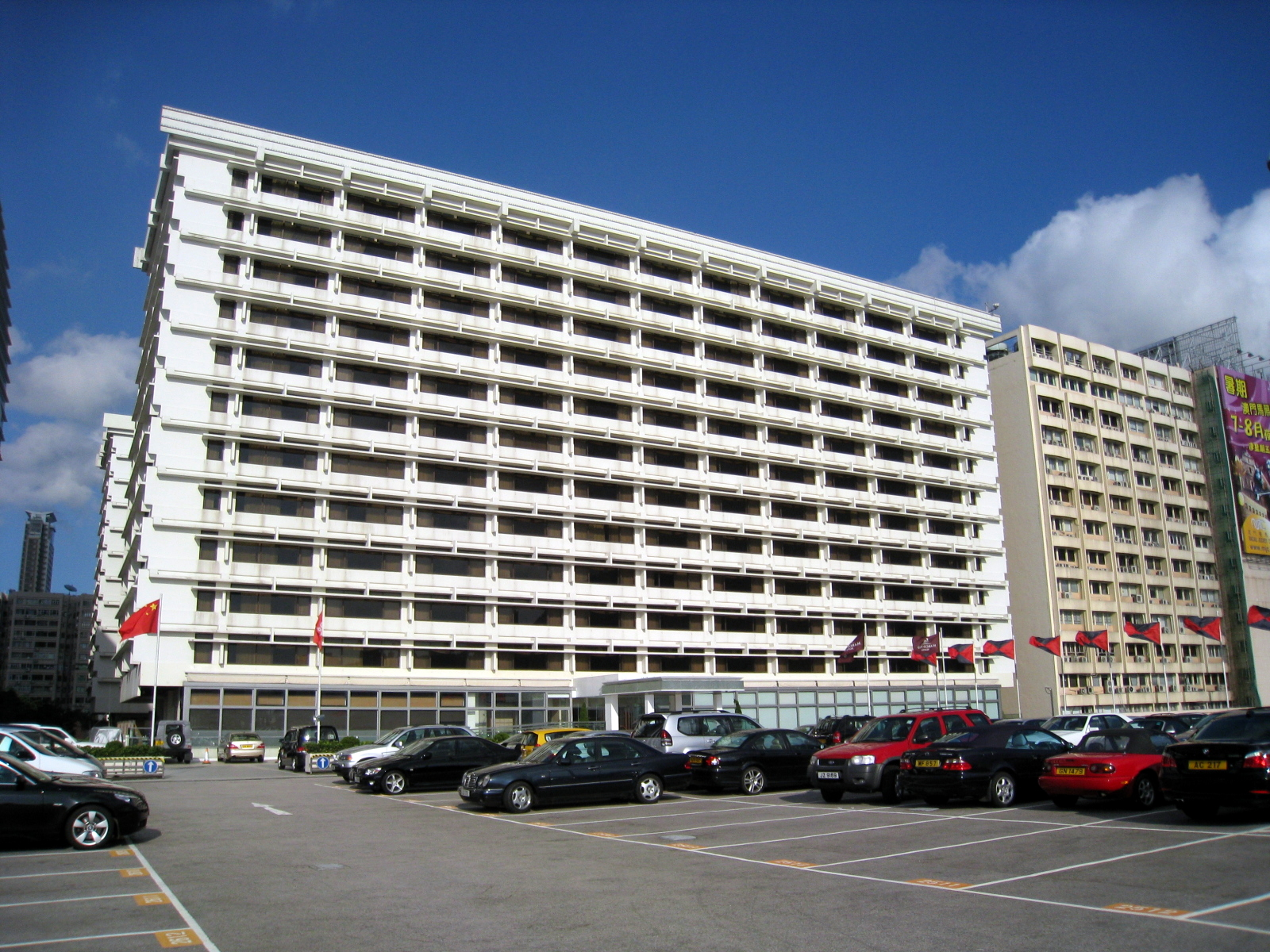
Marco Polo Hongkong Hotel

Current locations of Marco Polo hotels are in Hong Kong (Marco Polo Hongkong, Gateway Hotel and Prince Hotel), mainland China (Marco Polo Parkside Beijing, Marco Polo Wuhan, Marco Polo Shenzhen, Marco Polo Xiamen, Marco Polo Jinjiang and Marco Polo Lingnan Tiandi, Foshan and the Philippines (Marco Polo Plaza Cebu, Marco Polo Davao and the Marco Polo Ortigas Manila). Niccolo Hotels was added to the group's portfolio as the new luxury collection in 2015. Its first hotel opened in Chengdu in April 2015 and is located at International Finance Square (IFS) in the centre of the city, followed by the opening of Niccolo Hotels in Chongqing, Changsha, Hong Kong SAR and Suzhou.
