= Marco Polo Davao =

Hotel in Davao City, Philippines

- The hotel building in 2008
- Interactive map of the Marco Polo Davao area

General information
- Status: Completed
- Location: Davao City, Philippines
- Coordinates: 7°04′18.6″N 125°36′41.7″E
- Opening: April 27, 1998; 27 years ago
- Closed: June 20, 2020; 5 years ago
- Owner: Halifax Hotel Davao, Inc.
- Management: Marco Polo Hotels

Technical details
- Floor count: 18

Other information
- Number of rooms: 245

Marco Polo Davao was a hotel in Davao City, Philippines.

== History ==
Businessman Carlos Dominguez III conceptualized the idea of setting up a "first class" hotel in his hometown of Davao City around 1994. In his capacity of chairman and CEO of Halifax Hotel Davao, Inc., Dominguez approached various hotel brands for partnership namely – Hilton, Lian Court, Marco Polo, Mariott and New World. Halifax chose to partner with Marco Polo Hotels, which was based in Hong Kong.

By July 1997, construction of the Marco Polo Davao was underway. The building was erected at a 6,000-square-meter (65,000 sq ft) lot. At the time of its opening on April 27, 1998, the hotel building was the tallest in Davao City at 18 storeys and 245 rooms. It remained the tallest until the mid-2010s.

Marco Polo Davao ceased operations on June 15, 2020 due to the COVID-19 pandemic. Two years after the closure, Halifax Davao started the "planning phase" for the possible reopening of the hotel. As of May 2024, renovation of the hotel building facade was underway.

== Facilities ==
Marco Polo Davao was hosted in a 18-storey building and had 245-rooms. It also had 12 function rooms.
