= Marco Polo Plaza Cebu =

Hotel in Cebu City, Philippines

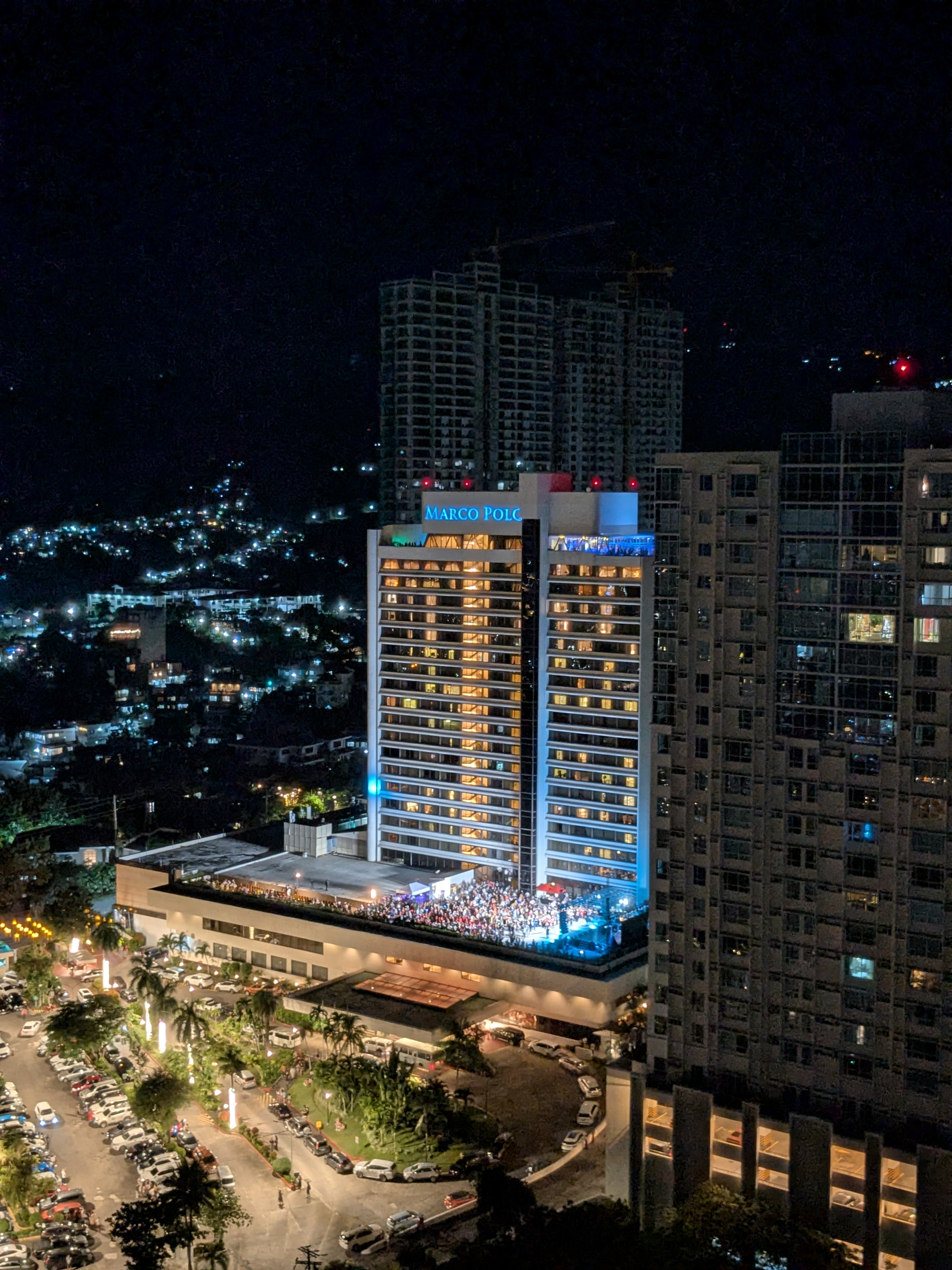
- The hotel building in 2024
- Interactive map of the Marco Polo Plaza Cebu area
- Former names: Cebu Plaza Hotel

General information
- Status: Completed
- Location: Cebu City, Philippines
- Coordinates: 10°20′30.0″N 123°53′49.7″E
- Elevation: 182.88 m (600.0 ft)
- Construction started: 1982
- Opening: 1983; 43 years ago
- Owner: Cebu Plaza Hotel Management Corporation (1983–1987); Pathfinder Holdings Philippines (1987–2003); Metrobank Group (2003–)
- Operator: Cebu Plaza Hotel Management Corporation (1983–1986); Philippine Tourism Authority (1986–1987); Development Bank of the Philippines (1987); Pathfinder Holdings Philippines (1987–2003); Marco Polo Hotels (2006–)

Technical details
- Floor count: 24

Other information
- Number of rooms: 329

The Marco Polo Plaza Cebu, operated as the Cebu Plaza Hotel from 1983 to 2003, is a hotel in Cebu City, Philippines.

It first opened in 1983 by a corporation led by Anos Fonacier with the help of his connections in the then-government of President Ferdinand Marcos Sr..

The hotel experienced labor strikes following the removal of Marcos Sr. as president shortly after the People Power Revolution of 1986. It was seized by the succeeding administration of president Corazon Aquino the following year. The hotel continues to experience labor issues under the management of its new owners Pathfinder.

The hotel then closed in 2003 after its foreclosure to Metrobank. Metrobank then partnered with Marco Polo Hotels to redevelop the property into the Metro Polo Plaza Cebu and was reopened in 2006.

== History ==
=== As Cebu Plaza Hotel ===
==== Early years under Anos Fonacier ====
The Marco Polo Plaza Cebu was initially known as the Cebu Plaza Hotel. The construction of the building began in 1982 and was funded by the Development Bank of the Philippines (DBP) and was initiated by the group of businessman Anos Fonacier. His connections with Tourism minister Jose Aspiras enabled Fonacier to secure loans from state financial institutions.

The hotel was opened sometime in late 1983 after the Assassination of Ninoy Aquino which preluded a recession in the economy. It was managed under the Cebu Plaza Hotel Management Corporation.

President Ferdinand Marcos Sr. was deposed during the People Power Revolution of February 1986. A labor strike was initiated by the National Federation of Labor (NFL) and Kilusang Mayo Uno (KMU) shortly after the event which led to Fonacier's group to cede the management of the hotel to the Philippine Tourism Authority (PTA). A strike was held again in late-1986 by NFL-KMU urging the resignation of hotel officials led by general manager Amor Salud. The resulting settlement was disputed by another labor group, Cebu Plaza Hotel Employees Union which says the deal did not benefit its members.

By February 1987, the DBP took over the management of the hotel from the PTA. It was also sequestered by the Presidential Commission on Good Government (PCGG) on suspicions that the hotel was actually owned by former president Marcos Sr. and his associates.

The Cebu Plaza Hotel was classed as a non-performing asset and was given to the Asset Privatization Trust (APT) to sold the hotel to a private investor. In June 1987, the hotel underwent bidding and was sold to Hong Kong-based Arab Asia International for $16 million (₱328 million). The other bidders were Chan Chak Fu and a company by sugar magnate Antonio Chan.

==== Under Pathfinder Holdings Philippines ====
Cebu Plaza Hotel was taken over by Arab Asia's sister company Pathfinder Holdings Philippines Inc. The hotel at around this time had 415 rooms. The turnover to Pathfinder was hampered by picketing started in July 1987 by workers who were employed under the old management and affiliated with NFL-KMU. The action lasted for months crossing over at least to January 1988

Renovation works on the hotel was made in July 1995 to add an executive floor.

Due to persistent labor issues, the hotel closed in March 2003. Pathfinder underwent a foreclosure facilitated by Metrobank and was sold to the bank using the hotel as collateral to pay a ₱900 million loan.

=== As Marco Polo Plaza Cebu ===
Metrobank entered a partnership with Hong Kong-based Marco Polo Hotels in July 2005 to redevelop and open the Cebu Plaza Hotel. The property arm of Metrobank Group, Federal Land started redeveloping the property in late 2005. It reopened as the Marco Polo Plaza Cebu on April 27, 2006, in a ceremony led by then-president Gloria Macapagal Arroyo. The hotel opened with 329 rooms.

== Facilities ==
The Marco Polo Plaza Cebu stand on top of Nivel Hills at an elevation of 182.88-meter (600.0 ft) above sea level in Lahug, Cebu City. The 24-storey building has 329 hotel rooms. The Cebu Grand Ballroom is a 1,099.6 m^{2} (11,836 sq ft) events space which can accommodate 800 people.
