= Maxandrea Hotel =

Hotel in Cagayan de Oro, Philippines

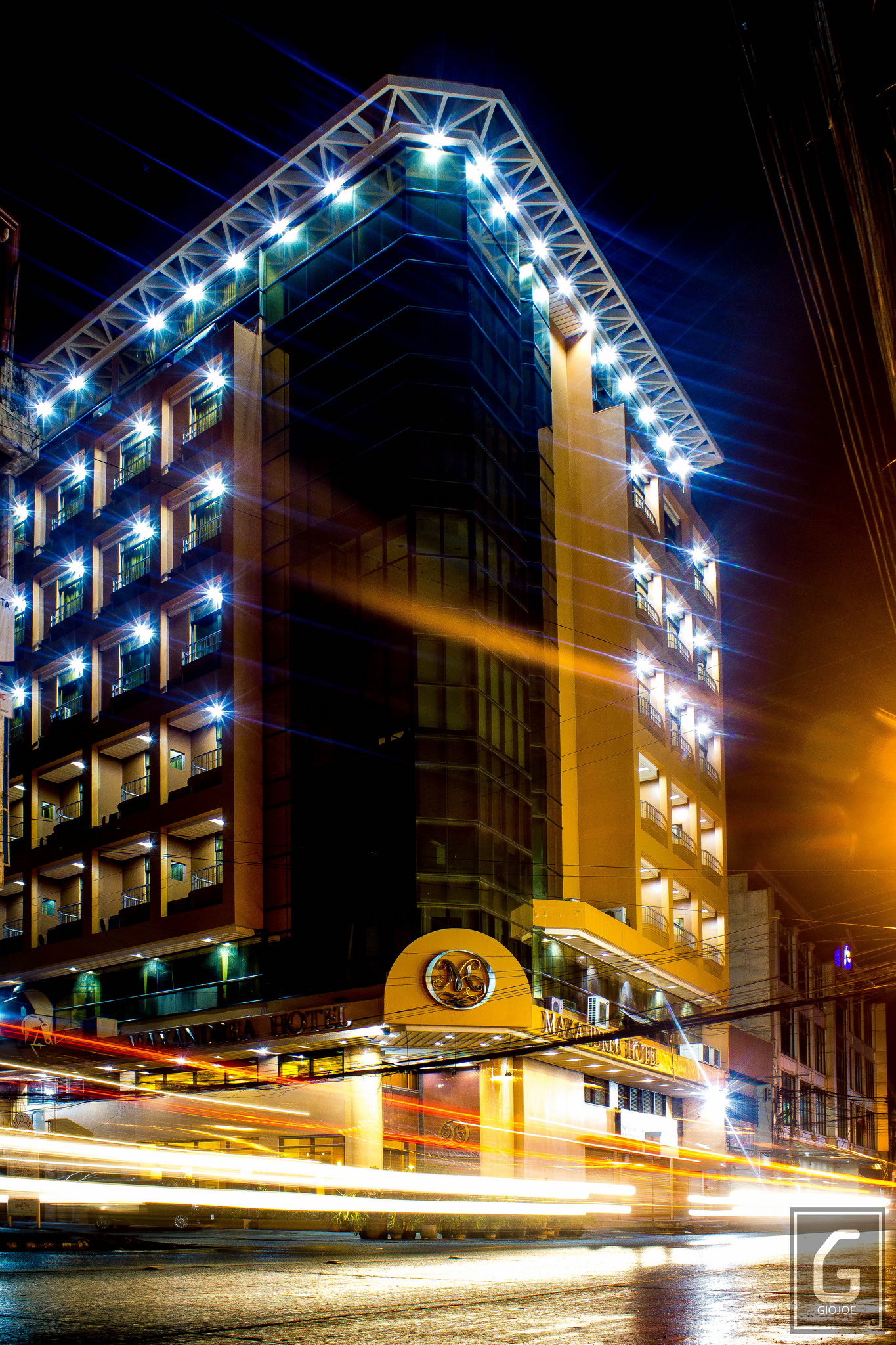
- Located at JR Borja St., Cagayan de Oro
- Interactive map of the Maxandrea Hotel area

General information
- Location: Cagayan de Oro, Philippines, J.R Borja cor Aguinaldo Street
- Coordinates: 8°28′41″N 124°38′54″E
- Cost: 850 million pesos

Technical details
- Floor count: 8 floors

Other information
- Number of rooms: 47
- Number of suites: 25
- Number of restaurants: 2

Website
- maxandrea.com/index.php

Maxandrea Hotel is a four star hotel located in Cagayan de Oro, Philippines. It is built in 2005 downtown business center in Misamis Oriental. It features renaissance marbles and hardwood floors in gold building structure. This first class hotel is cheaper accommodation with its amenities, however. The hotel has 8 storey houses 47 rooms include suites and rooms. In 2007, Maxandrea Hotel have certificated of COHARA (Cagayan de Oro Hotel and Restaurant Association) wherein meets standardized class.
