= Maxwell Hotel Cebu =

Hotel in Cebu City, Philippines

- Interactive map of the Maxwell Hotel Cebu area

General information
- Location: Cebu City, Philippines
- Coordinates: 10°19′03″N 123°53′42″E
- Opened: 2008

Other information
- Number of rooms: 72

The Maxwell Hotel Cebu is a 72-room hotel located near the centre of Cebu City, Philippines. It opened in 2008 and primarily caters to business travellers. In addition to room rentals, its services and facilities include Maxim's Restaurant & Bar, Agua: An Urban Massage Salon, Tropical Sun Travels & Tours, and 3e Convenience Store and Coffee Shop.

== Special guests and events ==
A few celebrity guests have stayed at the Maxwell Hotel. In August 2009, Sarah Geronimo visited Cebu in order to promote the Cebu leg of her concert. She held her press conference at the Maxim Cafe & Restaurant, located at the first floor of the hotel. Blogger Mhel Villamar Daroy visited Cebu and stayed in the Maxwell Hotel.

The hotel also sponsored the Mr. and Ms. Workout Philippines 2009 Bodybuilding and Fitness Championships held on August 30, 2009. Some of the contestants stayed in the hotel during the event.

The Philippine School of Culinary Arts has opened a branch in the annex building of the Maxwell Hotel.
