= Supreme Court Building Complex, Fort Bonifacio =

Supreme Court of the Philippines Building

General information
- Status: Proposed
- Type: Court building
- Location: Bonifacio Capital District, Fort Bonifacio, Taguig, Philippines
- Groundbreaking: October 2015
- Construction started: On Hold
- Owner: Supreme Court of the Philippines

The Supreme Court of the Philippines was due to move to a proposed building to be built at the Bonifacio Capital District in Fort Bonifacio, Taguig, Metro Manila, but is now on hold.

== History ==
The Supreme Court of the Philippines occupies a buildings on a lot owned by the University of the Philippines Manila. The court has not owned its own property in its almost 100 years of existence. As early as August 2014, the Supreme Court has expressed its plans to move to Bonifacio Global City (BGC). In July 2015, the court was reportedly prospecting to buy a lot in the business center through the Department of Budget and Management's funds. At that time the court projected that it would have moved to a newer building by 2019.

A ₱1.29 billion contract between the Supreme Court and the Bases Conversion and Development Authority preceded a groundbreaking ceremony which was held in October 2015 on the lot where the new Supreme Court building complex will stand. It was projected at that time that the design phase will commence in 2016 and the construction phase will last from 2017 to 2019. An environmentally sustainable design is what the Supreme Court envisions for the building. However the construction alltogether is still currently on hold, it is unknown to the public as to when construction will begin again.

== Architecture and design ==
In August 2014, the court was reportedly eyeing architect Felino Palafox Jr. to design the BGC Building. The International Conceptual Design Competition was later held, which called for local and international firms to make their proposals for the design of the Philippine Supreme Court BGC complex. The Supreme Court stipulated the following terms of the competition: it called for a design for a "culturally iconic building and a legacy for generations to come", the incorporation of the "four pillars of justice", and that the building will exhibit a "green and resilient" design for an "effective and efficient dispensation of justice".

The team from Philippine firm Mañosa & Company led by Angelo Mañosa won the design competition from among 10 finalists. The design contract still to be awarded to the firm due to government procedures. Mañosa's design called for a building complex inspired from the sun motif of the Philippine flag. The firm's proposed design calls for a complex composing of three building clusters surrounding a circular central tower which is meant to host the En Banc Session Hall.
