= Rizal Park Hotel =

Hotel in Manila, Philippines

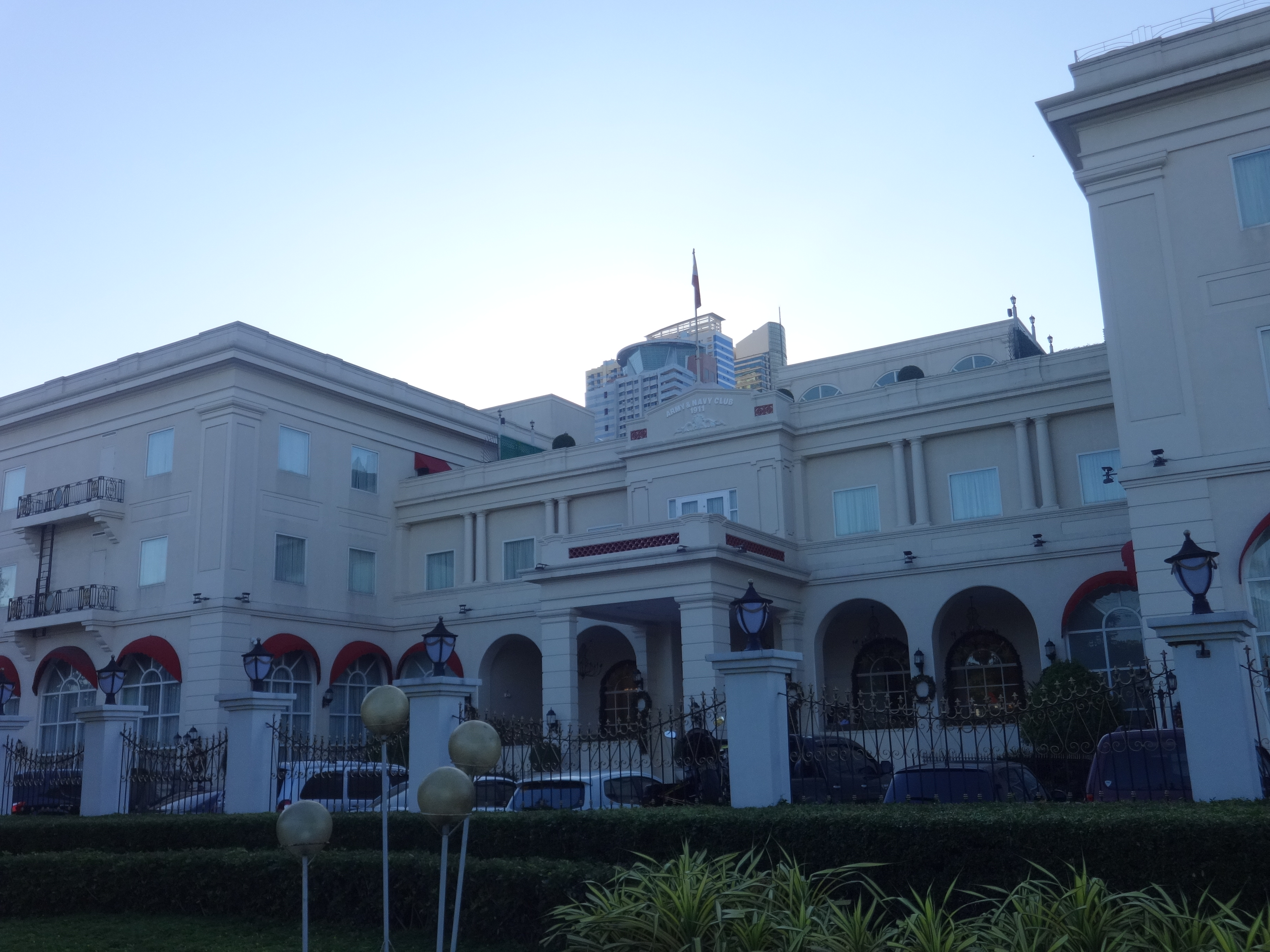
- The facade of the hotel in 2019

- Location within Philippines

General information
- Location: Manila, Philippines, South Road Drive, T. M. Kalaw Avenue Extension, Ermita
- Coordinates: 14°34′43.4″N 120°58′33.8″E
- Opening: 26 July 2017
- Owner: Simon Lee-Paz
- Operator: Oceanville Hotel and Spa Corporation

Design and construction
- Architect: William E. Parsons n

Other information
- Number of rooms: 107
- Number of restaurants: 2
- Number of bars: 1

Website
- rizalparkhotel.com.ph

The Rizal Park Hotel (formerly the Manila Army and Navy Club) is a 107-room, historic five-star hotel located along Manila Bay in Manila, Philippines. The hotel, which opened on 26 July 2017, occupies the Manila Army and Navy Club building following its demolition and redevelopment in 2014 by hotel developer Oceanville Hotel and Spa Corporation. Prior to the building's redevelopment, the building once served as the City Architect's Office and then as the Museo ng Maynila (Museum of Manila) before being abandoned for several years.

== History ==
The Rizal Park Hotel occupies the building of the Manila Army and Navy Club, a social club exclusive to US Army and Navy personnel stationed in the Philippines. The club was originally founded in 1898 at a site on the corner of P. Burgos Street and Nozaleda Street (now General Luna Street) in Intramuros, Manila. Following the completion of the Luneta Extension, a reclaimed land in front of the Luneta Park that was part of American architect and urban planner Daniel Burnham's plan for the city of Manila, a piece of land in the extension was reserved for the club where the present building was constructed. Designed by architect William E. Parsons, the building was completed on 17 April 1911. The building shares the lot with the neighboring Manila Elks Club, a local branch of the fraternal lodge of the Benevolent and Protective Order of Elks.

According to historian Manolo Quezon, the building was the "center of the American military's social life" in the Philippines from the time it was built until the outbreak of World War II in the Pacific in 1941. American military personnel and their families enjoyed amenities they typically enjoyed in the US during their stay at the building. The club had a swimming pool, a lawn tennis court, a dining area, a lounge area, a ballroom, a barber shop and even a shoeshine stand. It also had several rooms where American military personnel and their families can stay and rest. At the back of the building, there was a small dock where American navy personnel can be offloaded from their ships.

With the outbreak of World War II, the Americans designated the building as a bomb shelter and evacuation center. When the invading Japanese forces arrived in Manila, they used the abandoned building as headquarters for senior officers. During the Battle of Manila in 1945, the Japanese used it as a garrison and command post, before being burned, sustaining substantial damage to the roof and ballroom. After the combined Filipino and American forces recaptured the city, the US Army and Navy Engineering Corps rebuilt the building and it opened again on 1 December 1945.

In the years that followed the war, the club experienced a decline in membership as American military personnel began to be shipped home. To continue attracting clients, the club decided to open the club's membership to civilians from the US and other countries. It also converted the large ballroom into a theater which hosted entertaining performances each night. Throughout the 1950s to the 1980s, the club was one of the famous hangout places for Manila's social elite.

In 1980, the City of Manila took over the property and used it as the City Architect's Office but was abandoned after it showed signs of structural defects. It was subsequently used as a manufacturing site for the city's Christmas lanterns before becoming the site of the short-lived Museo ng Maynila in 2007. On 26 April 1991, the National Historical Institute (NHCP) declared the building a National Historical Landmark, thereby, becoming eligible for preservation as a historical site.

== Redevelopment ==
For several years after the Museo ng Maynila closed, the Manila Army and Navy Club building was left in a state of disrepair. In 2014, the City of Manila, with the approval of the NHCP entered into a lease agreement with Oceanville Hotel and Spa Corporation for the renovation and use of the building as a five-star hotel.

The redevelopment of the building started in 2014 with multiple consultants being tapped for the design and structural assessment of the building. After the assessment was completed, work began in the retrofitting of the building's columns using reinforced concrete. It was also decided, with the approval of the NHCP, including many of the original wrought-iron windows, wrought-iron railings and ceramic floor tiles inside the building, were also cleared, which caused controversy after photos of the clearing operation circulated in social media.

Following Oceanville's presentation of the final plan for the building, the NHCP withdrew its cease-and-desist order provided that no additional demolition of the building's historical components will be conducted without the agency's approval. By 2015, the redevelopment of the building resumed but it caused controversy again after a claim from environmentalists with regards to the trees. It drew criticism from heritage conservationists and environmentalists, but according to the developer, 13 trees were earth-balled and replanted in another location, all with the approval of the Department of Environment and Natural Resources. The redevelopment of the building reportedly costs ₱2.4 billion.

== Reopening ==
The Rizal Park Hotel had its soft opening and grand launch on 26 July 2017. The launch was attended by Philippine president Rodrigo Duterte who, in his speech, said: "The American-owned Army and Navy Club, it's now so beautiful, much may be prettier than the original one. What is very consoling is that all of the American properties are already in the hands of the Chinese. Very good."

According to Oceanville Hotel and Spa president Cornelio Abdon, the boutique five-star hotel has 110 rooms, categorized as Standard, Deluxe, Junior Suite, Premier Suite, Premier Suite with Ante Room and Army Navy Club Suite.
