= City of Greater Manila =

Former administrative division of the Philippines

City of Greater Manila Lungsod ng Kalakhang Maynila (Tagalog) Ciudad de Gran Manila (Spanish) 大マニラ市 Dai Manira-shi (Japanese)
- Chartered city of the Philippines
- 1942–1945
- Location of the historical city of Greater Manila
- Government
- Mayor
  - December 24, 1941 – January 26, 1942: Jorge B. Vargas
  - January 27, 1942 – July 17, 1944: León Guinto
- Historical era: World War II
  - Established: January 1, 1942
  - Disestablished: August 1, 1945
Preceded by
Manila (city)
Quezon City
Rizal
Succeeded by
Manila (city)
Quezon City
Rizal
- Today part of: Metro Manila

Greater Manila, officially the City of Greater Manila and sometimes referred to as the Greater Manila Area (GMA), was a chartered city that existed during the Japanese occupation of the Philippines in World War II, from 1942 to 1945. Governed by the Commonwealth of the Philippines, it served as a model for the present-day Metro Manila and the administrative functions of the governor of Metro Manila—both established three decades later during the administration of President Ferdinand Marcos. It was a merger of Manila, Quezon City, and the then-Rizal towns of Caloocan, Makati, Mandaluyong, Parañaque, Pasay, and San Juan, all present parts of Metro Manila.

== History ==
Greater Manila was formed on January 1, 1942, by virtue of Executive Order No. 400 signed by President Manuel L. Quezon as an emergency measure. It was a merger of the cities of Manila and Quezon and the then-Rizal towns of Caloocan, Makati, Mandaluyong, Parañaque, Pasay, and San Juan. During that time, Manila served as the capital of the Philippines during the Japanese-sponsored Second Philippine Republic. Japanese forces occupied Manila on January 2, 1942.

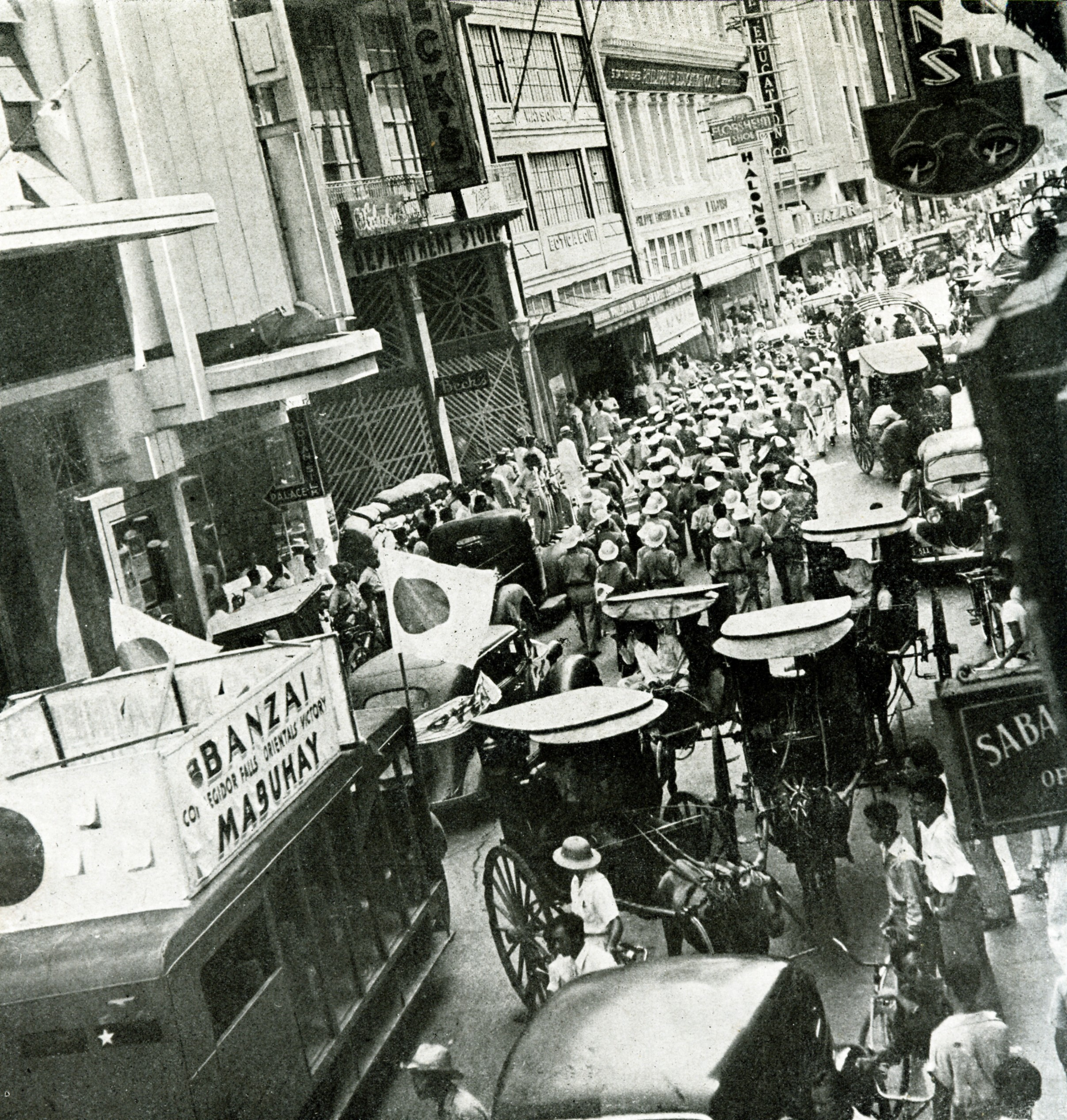
Manila after the fall of Corregidor, May 9, 1943.

The leadership of Greater Manila was given to Quezon's former Executive Secretary and Secretary of National Defense, Jorge B. Vargas, as the mayor. On the evening of New Year's Day of 1942, a Japanese courier delivered notice to Vargas that Japanese forces already temporarily staying at Parañaque would enter Greater Manila the following day. On the morning of January 2, Japanese imperial forces marched into the component Manila. Vargas opted a Filipino-selected government, leading to the creation of the Philippine Executive Commission (PEC), which he chaired. He appointed León Guinto as Mayor later that month. During this period, areas like Quezon City were strategically significant: the Japanese military repurposed facilities like the Quezon Institute and Saint Joseph's College as hospitals, and the Imperial Japanese Army modernized Zablan Field (now Camp Aguinaldo). Resistance efforts were active in components like Pasay. The Japanese enforced language measures, though severe food scarcity caused some residents to flee to the provinces. Another component, Parañaque, supplied leadership to guerilla movements such as the Hunters ROTC, as well as food and arms. Parañaque was one of the first towns to be liberated and its guerillas helped pave the way for the combined American and Philippine Commonwealth forces to enter the south of Manila.

The liberation of the Philippines began on October 20, 1944, when American and Philippine Commonwealth troops, led by General Douglas MacArthur, began the reconquest. General Tomoyuki Yamashita ordered the commander of Shimbu Group, General Shizuo Yokoyama, to destroy bridges and other vital installations and the evacuation of Manila, but units of the Imperial Japanese Navy, led by Sanji Iwabuchi, refused to comply, leading to the Battle of Manila from February 3 to March 3, 1945. This battle, aided by an estimated 85,000 to 140,000 Filipino Commonwealth soldiers and guerrillas alongside 35,000 American liberation forces, resulted in the near-total destruction of Manila and the deaths of 100,000 to 500,000 civilians during the Manila Massacre. Heavy fighting also extended into component areas like New Manila in Quezon City and Pasay. Manila was left the second most destroyed city in the world after Warsaw, Poland.

On July 26, 1945, President Sergio Osmeña signed Executive Order No. 58, leading to the reduction of territories and the eventual dissolution of Greater Manila effective August 1. The cities and towns that were part of the city then regained their respective pre-war status.

== Composition ==
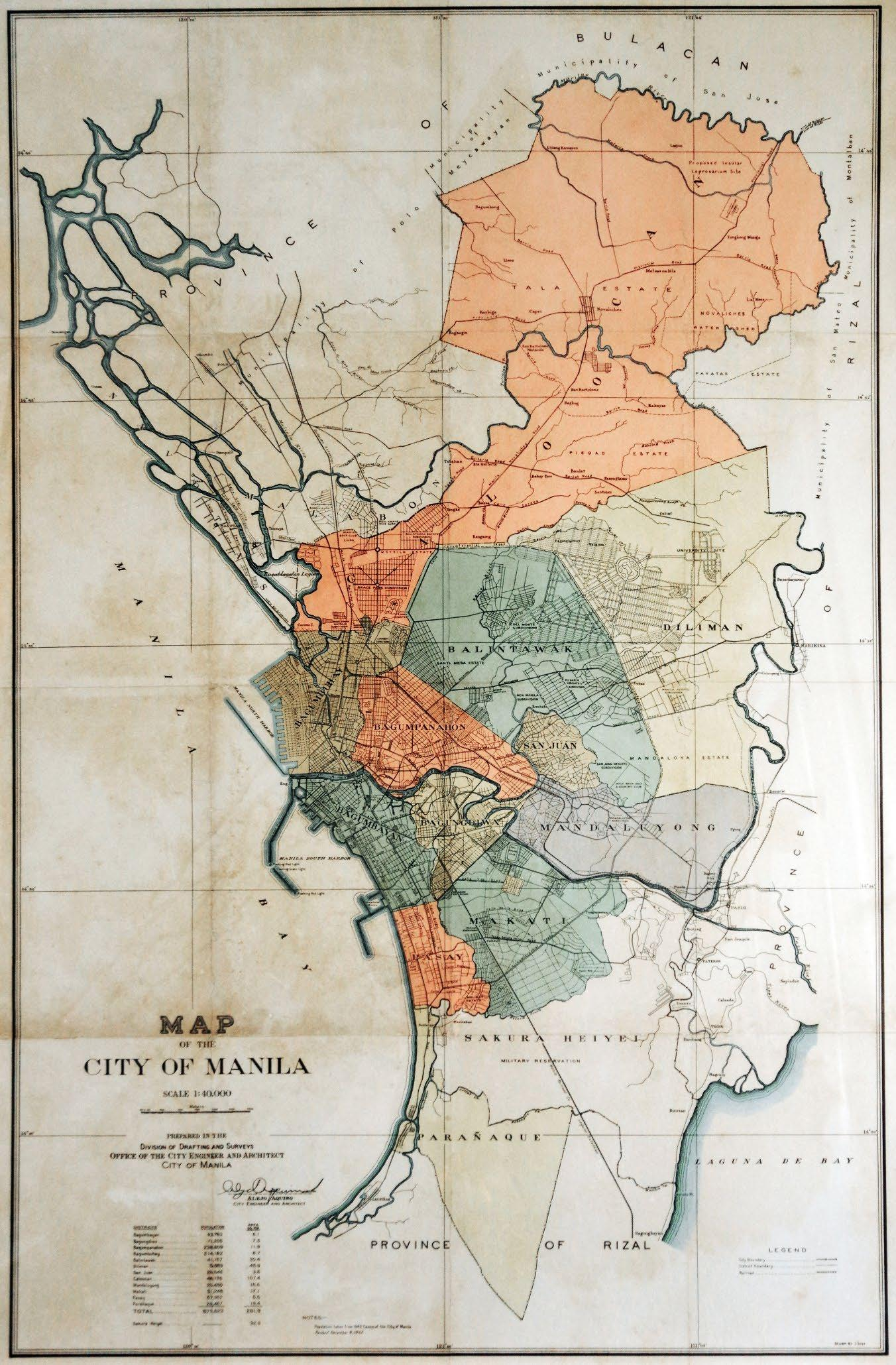
Map of the City of Greater Manila (1942)

Greater Manila was a merger of Manila, Quezon City, and the Rizal municipalities of Caloocan, Makati, Mandaluyong, Parañaque, Pasay, and San Juan, all parts of the present-day Metro Manila.

Manila was divided into four districts:

- Bagumbuhay covered Binondo, San Nicolas, Tondo, and the northern portion of Santa Cruz.
- Bagumpanahon covered the rest of Santa Cruz, Quiapo, Sampaloc (including the present-day Santa Mesa), and San Miguel.
- Bagumbayan covered Ermita, Intramuros, Malate, Port Area, and the western portion of Paco.
- Bagungdiwa covered the rest of Paco, Pandacan, and Santa Ana (including the present-day San Andres and the Manila South Cemetery exclave).

Quezon City was divided into two districts, bisected by the Manila Circumferential Road (now EDSA):

- Balintawak, located southwest of the road, covered San Francisco del Monte, Galas, La Loma, New Manila, Santa Mesa Estate, and the western portion of Mandaloya Estate, which encompassed the present-day northeastern portion of Mandaluyong (including Wack Wack Golf and Country Club) and the present-day eastern portion of San Juan (including Greenhills).
- Diliman, located northeast of the road, covered Diliman proper, Cubao, Bagongbantay (Bago Bantay), Culiat, the University District, the rest of Mandaloya Estate, and the present-day western portion of Marikina as it was extended up to the western bank of the Marikina River.

Meanwhile, the city's present-day northern portion was then part of Caloocan and San Mateo, Rizal.

Regarding the municipalities ceded from Rizal, Caloocan, which was then undivided, included the Cocomo Island, which includes what is now San Rafael Village, Navotas, but excluded the now-reclaimed Dagat-dagatan Lagoon and parts of Libis-Baesa, then under Malabon. Mandaluyong also included what is now the western portion of Pasig, west of the Marikina River. The Sakura Heiyei military reservation, located south of Maricaban Creek and including the Nichols Field (now part of Pasay), Fort McKinley (now Fort Bonifacio), along with the present-day eastern and southwestern portions of Parañaque, was not part of Greater Manila.

== Government ==
Greater Manila was headed by the mayor, who was also the chairman of the City Board, the legislative body of the city. The members of the City Board included the assistant mayor, city treasurer, city fiscal, city assessor, city health officer, city engineer and architect, and fire brigade commander. Mayors of the constituent municipalities and heads of districts now part of Manila and Quezon City were the district chiefs under the Chief of the Division of Districts and of the District and Neighborhood Association. The city was also represented in the National Assembly of the Japanese-sponsored Second Philippine Republic under the at-large district of Manila.

=== Mayors ===
Jorge B. Vargas assumed the mayoralty post in December 1941 upon appointment by President Manuel L. Quezon. Vargas later appointed León Guinto as his successor in January 1942.

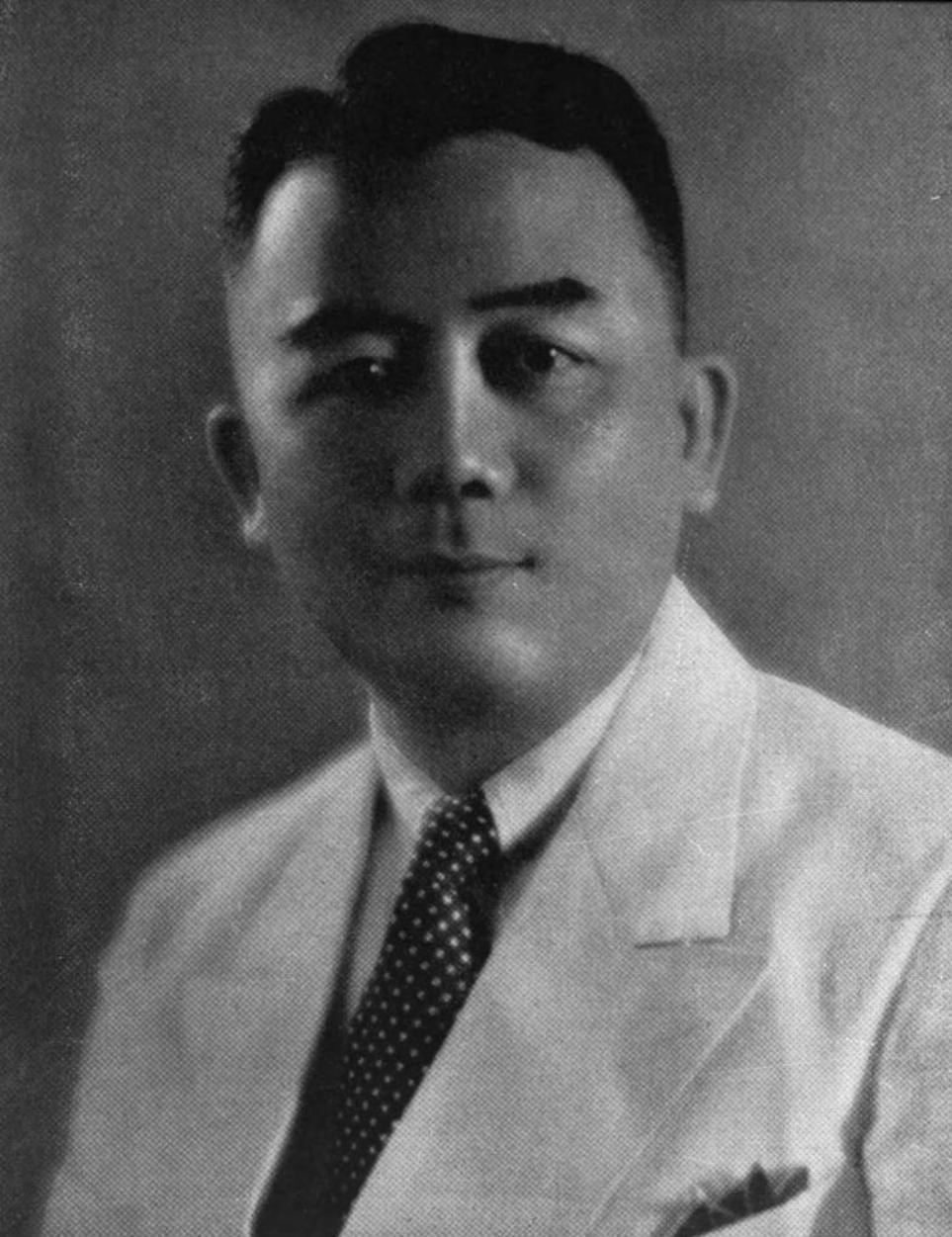
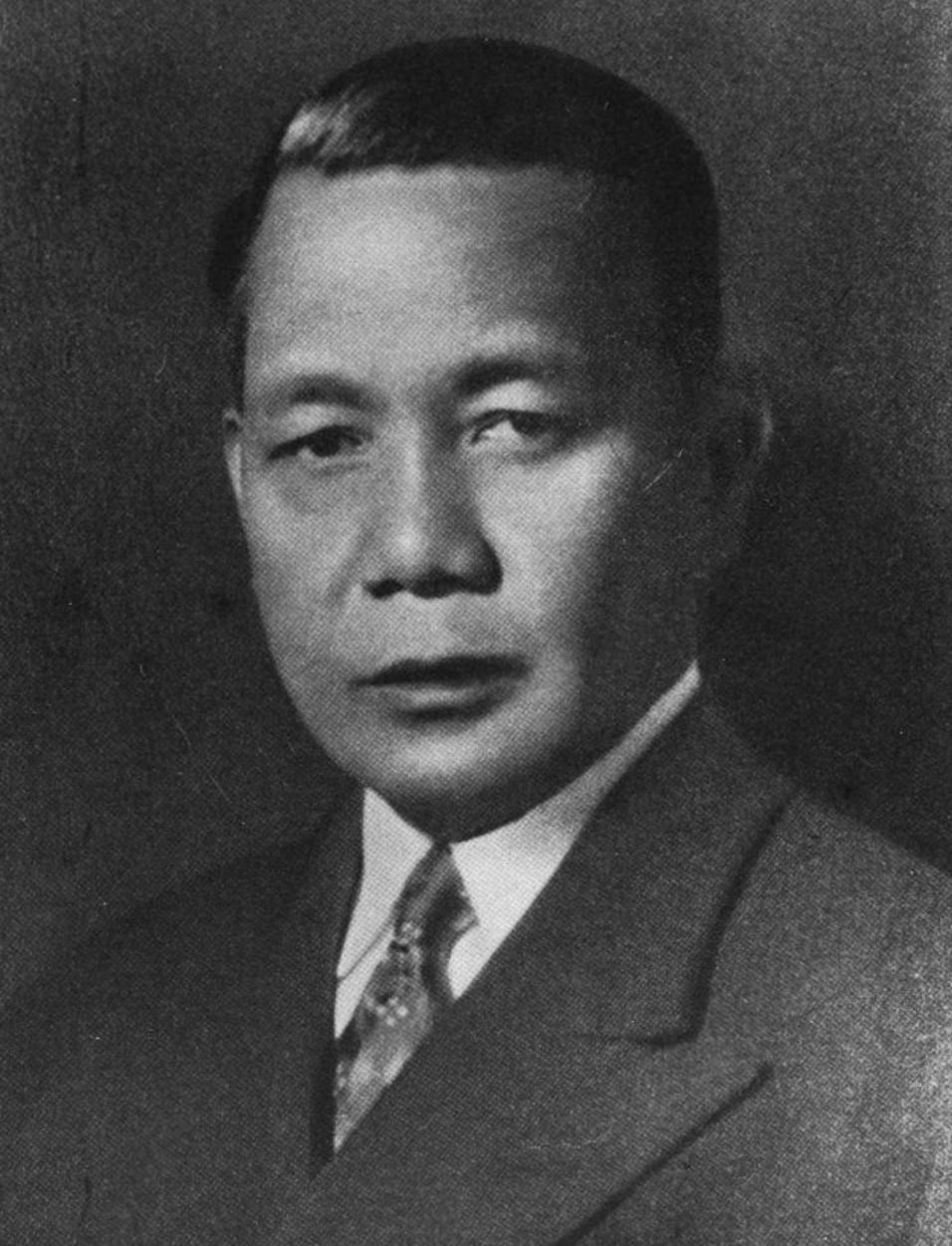
PICTURE	MAYOR	TERM
	Jorge B. Vargas	December 24, 1941–January 26, 1942
	León G. Guinto Sr.	January 27, 1942 – July 17, 1944

== See also ==
- Metro Manila

Preceded by Manila	Capital of the Second Philippine Republic; 1942–1944	Succeeded by Baguio (Japan) Nara/Tokyo
