= Manila Army and Navy Club =

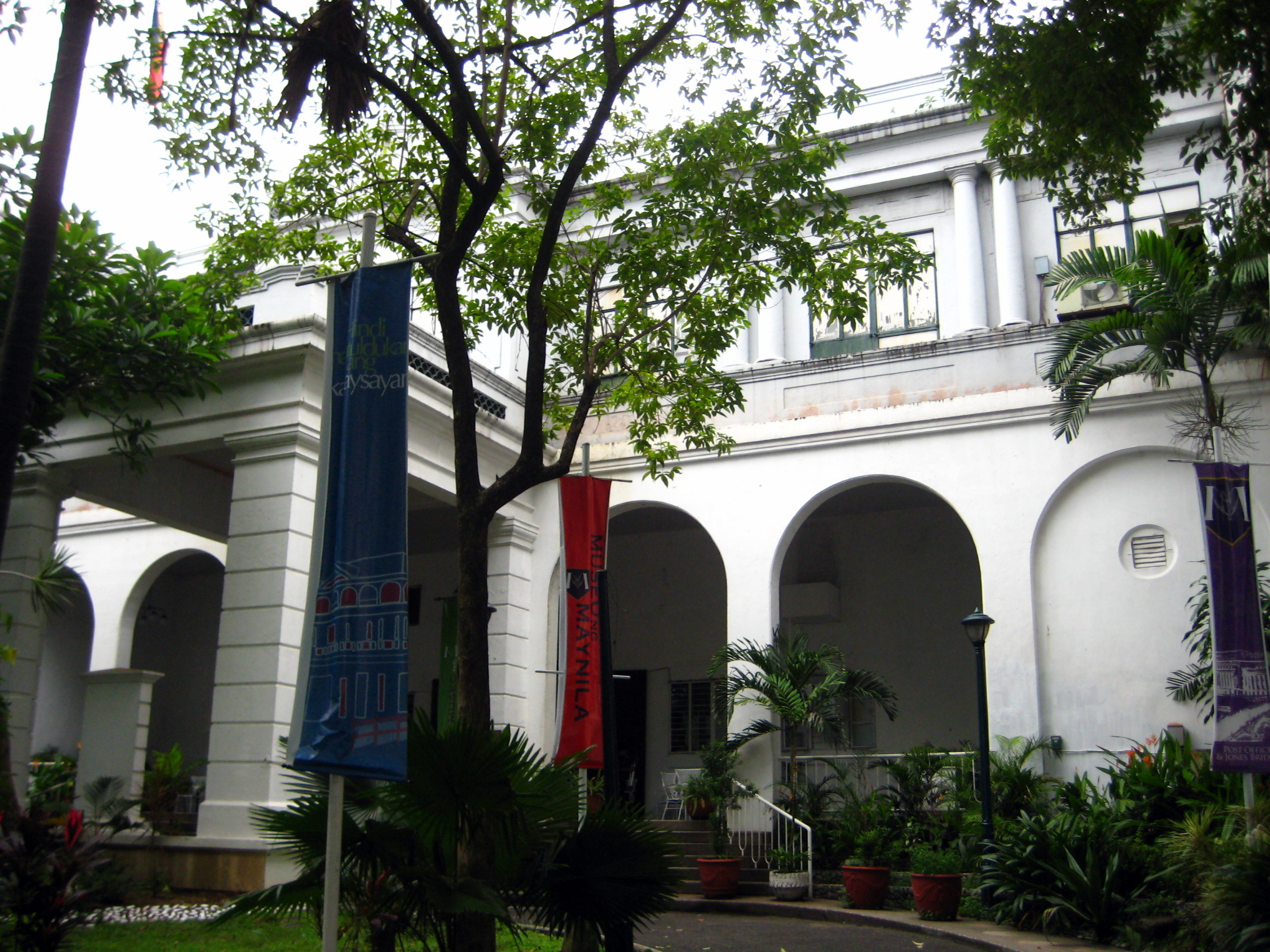
Exterior of Army Navy Club Manila

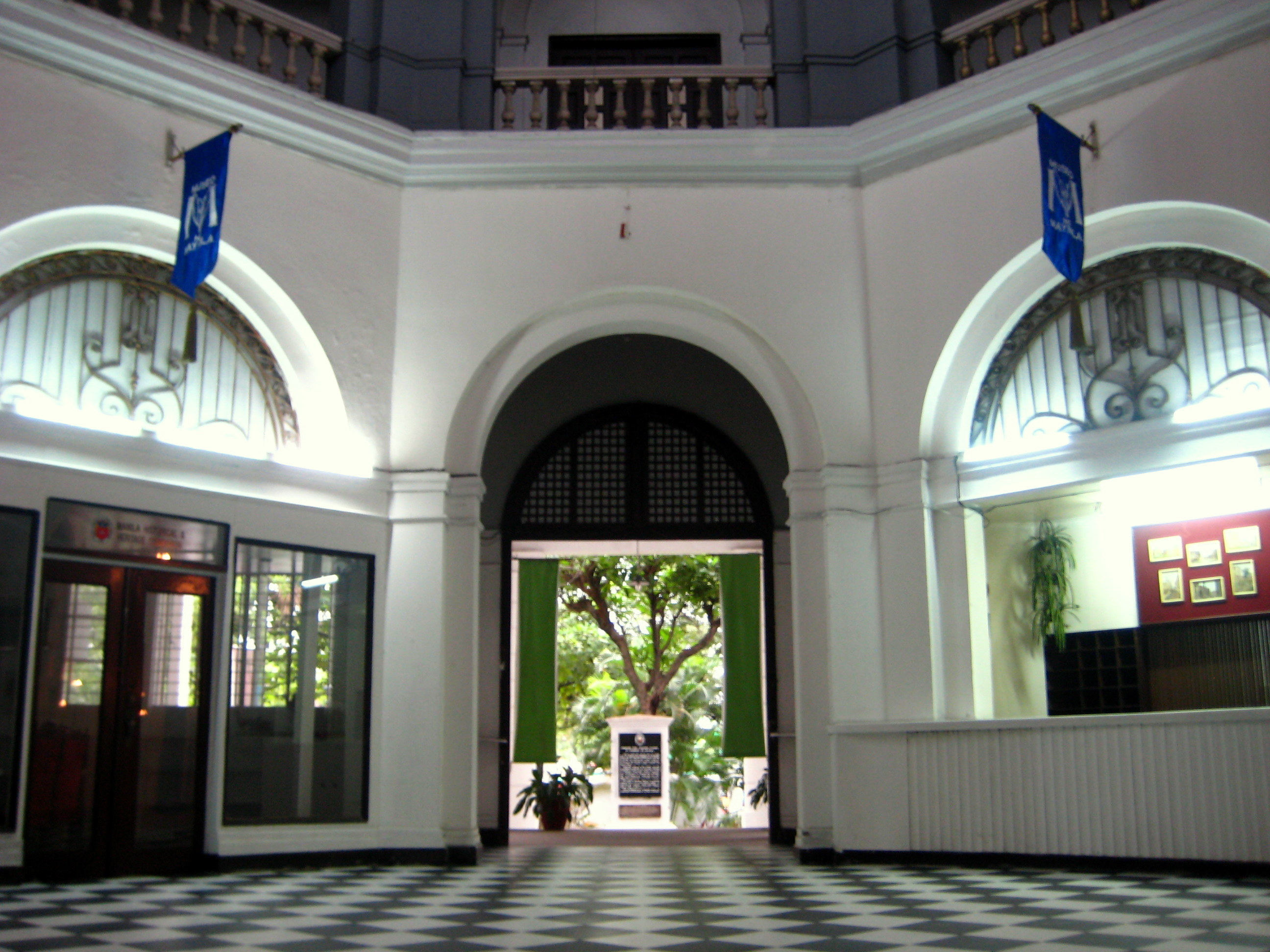
Army Navy Club Manila Reception Area

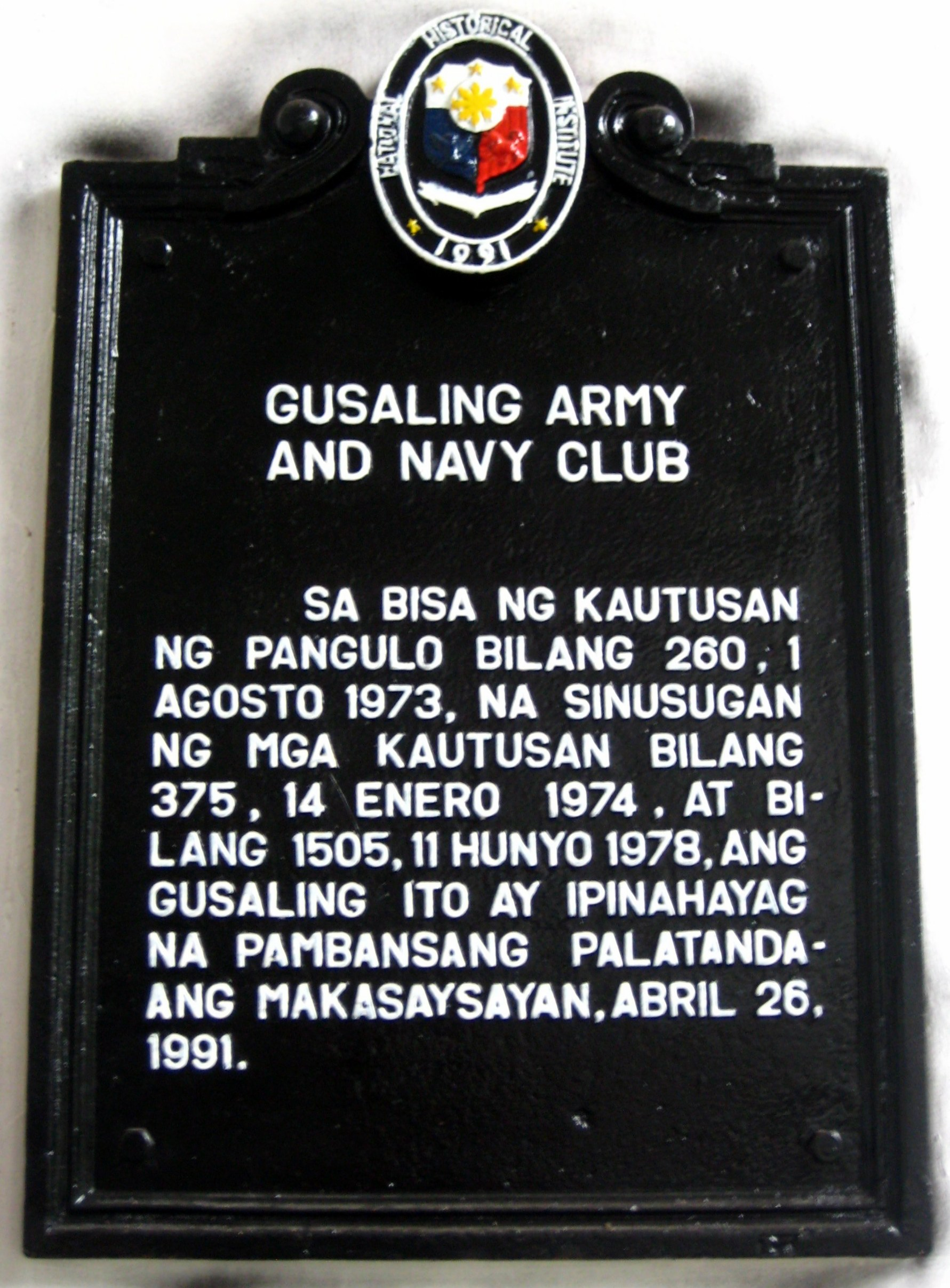
NHI Marker for Army Navy Club Building Manila

The Manila Army and Navy Club founded in 1898 was the first American social club to be established in the Philippines for the exclusive use of U.S. military personnel and civilians, and later Filipinos. Since the time it was established, it was one of the centers of Manila's social life. It was the site of many important events in Philippine–American relations.

== The Building ==
The building was designed by William E. Parsons and has his characteristic trademark of the generous use of arches. It was built by the US Army Corps of Engineers. It was completed on April 17, 1911

In his book, McCallus described the current state of the Army and Navy Club as:

a dignified white structure, nearly hidden by beautiful palms and acacia trees, and guarded by a well-carved wrought iron fence. The original was a spacious H-shaped affair (...). The club has a reputation of being among the best of its type in the world with excellent food, a superb staff, and a swimming pool. It also boasted a bowling alley, tennis and squash courts, and a huge officer's bar.

== History ==
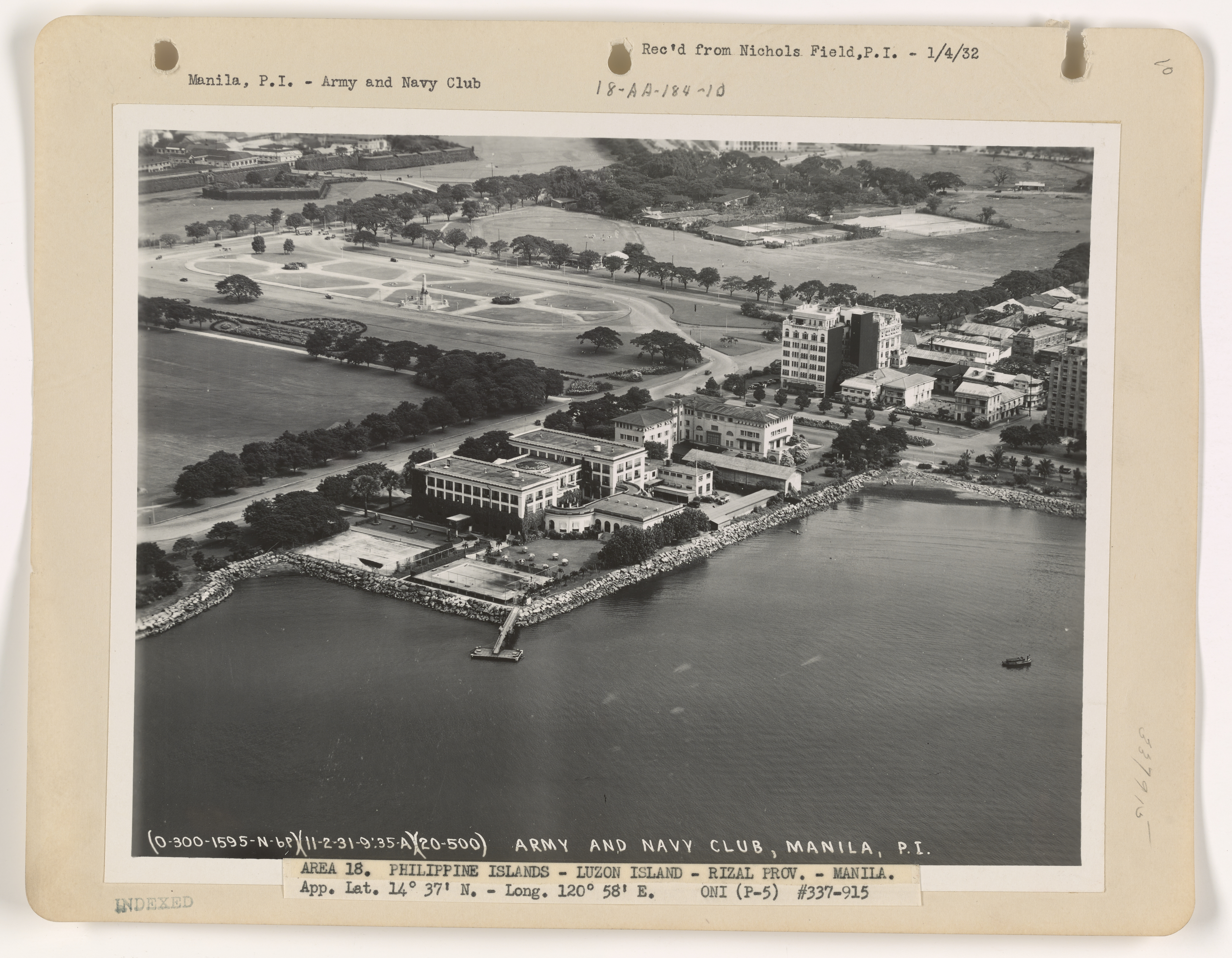
Aerial view of the Army and Navy Club, 1932

The Army and Navy Club of Manila was organized in December 1898. The first president was Col. Smith of California. Notable persons who became its presidents were Adm. George Dewey, Gen. Arthur MacArthur, Jr. and his son Douglas MacArthur, and Leonard Wood.

Originally, the club was housed in a building in Intramuros, Manila and then in April, 1911 transferred to its present site near Rizal Park, an area along the shores of Manila Bay reserved by urban planner Daniel Burnham in his plan of Manila. The club shared a lot with the Manila Elks Club, a local branch of the fraternal lodge of the Benevolent and Protective Order of Elks whose membership was open to civilians and is still operating. Together they were the center of the social life of Americans in Manila for many decades.

During the Second World War, it was used as a bomb shelter and evacuation center during attacks by the Japanese Army and it was occupied by the Japanese during the entirety of the Japanese occupation of the Philippines.

The building survived the war but its gradual decline began in the 1960s and for a time served as the city architect's office until the building showed signs of crumbling. It was then used as a manufacturing site for the city's Christmas lanterns, thereby contributing more to the building's decay until it was resurrected as the short-lived Museo de Manila.

On April 26, 1991, it was declared a National Historical Landmark by the National Historical Institute. In 2007 the then-derelict building was planned to be renovated. In June 2017, the building reopened as the Rizal Park Hotel with the building still retaining the name Manila Army and Navy Club at the facade.

== Life at the Club ==
During the American colonial period, Filipinos were not allowed in the club as described by a 1922 New York Times article on a speech from Senator Bingham:

Mr. Bingham's audience [during a speech in Hawaii] was all attention as he proceeded to relate how, a few weeks previously, he had been invited as guest of honor to a banquet in the Army & Navy Club of Manila. Mr. Bingham had asked whether outstanding native politicians, such as President Manuel Quezon of the Philippine Senate or Senator Sergio Osmena, independence leader, would be present; "Certainly not," snorted the Army & Navy Club of Manila, and proceeded to instruct Mr. Bingham that no Filipinos (except, of course, servants) were admitted within the doors of the Army & Navy Club of Manila.

The club in the 1930s was described by Aslakson:

The Army and Navy Club had a large veranda on the second floor on one side which had a long line of bunks side by side the length of the veranda. This was known as "drunk's row". We still had prohibition in the United States and when a transport came in there was sure to be many of the new arrivals who would imbibe too freely. Fellow officers would haul them up to "drunk's row" and let them sleep it off. In the morning fifteen to twenty officers would wake up on those bunks.

The Club had a beautiful swimming pool between the club and the sea wall which on festive occasions such as New Years Eve would at times be the recipient of officers and their wives in evening clothes.

== Redevelopment ==
For several years after the Museo ng Maynila closed, the Manila Army and Navy Club building was left in a state of disrepair. In 2014, the City of Manila, with the approval of the NHCP entered into a lease agreement with Oceanville Hotel and Spa Corporation for the renovation and use of the building as a five-star hotel. Oceanville then entered into memorandum of agreement with Vanderwood Management Corporation for the sublease of a portion of the building for 20 years for use as a gaming facility, which it then subleased to the Philippine Amusement and Gaming Corporation (PAGCOR) for 15 years.

The redevelopment of the building started in 2014 with Palafox Associates and AMH Philippines being tapped for the design and structural assessment of the building, respectively. After the assessment was completed, work began in the retrofitting of the building's columns using reinforced concrete. It was also decided, with the approval of the NHCP, to remove two annex buildings at the back of the property that were not part of the original building. Debris, including many of the original wrought-iron windows, wrought-iron railings and ceramic floor tiles inside the building, were also cleared, which caused controversy after photos of the clearing operation circulated in social media. On 5 September 2014, the NHCP issued a cease-and-desist order against Oceanville for tampering with the main building without their permission. Oceanville argued that the clearing was done to remove debris that might pose danger to workers on the site. But the NHCP said the developer acted without the agency's approval.

Following Oceanville and Palafox Associates' presentation of the final plan for the building, the NHCP withdrew its cease-and-desist order provided that no additional demolition of the building's historical components will be conducted without the agency's approval. By 2015, the redevelopment of the building resumed but it caused controversy again after the engineering firm behind the project cut several old trees located in the site. It drew criticism from heritage conservationists and environmentalists. According to the developer, 31 trees were cut while 13 were earth-balled and replanted in another location, all with the approval of the Department of Environment and Natural Resources. The redevelopment of the building reportedly costs P2.4 billion.

== Reopening ==
The Rizal Park Hotel had its soft opening and grand launch on 26 July 2017. The launch was attended by Philippine president Rodrigo Duterte who, in his speech, said: "The American-owned Army and Navy Club, it's now so beautiful, much may be prettier than the original one. What is very consoling is that all of the American properties are already in the hands of the Chinese. Very good."

According to Oceanville Hotel and Spa president Cornelio Abdon, the boutique five-star hotel has 110 rooms, categorized as Standard, Deluxe, Junior Suite, Premier Suite, Premier Suite with Ante Room and Army Navy Club Suite. Among the amenities of the hotel include a 300-square-meter (3,200 sq ft) spa; all-day dining at the hotel's sole restaurant; a coffee shop and a 600-square-meter (6,500 sq ft) sky bar. It also has an infinity swimming pool at the back, a bakeshop that sells freshly baked pastries, a banquet that can seat 1,200 person and a completely staffed kitchen with 38 chefs.

== See also ==
- Naval Base Manila
