= Kalayaan Hall =

Government building in Manila, Philippines

- Bulwagang Kalayaan
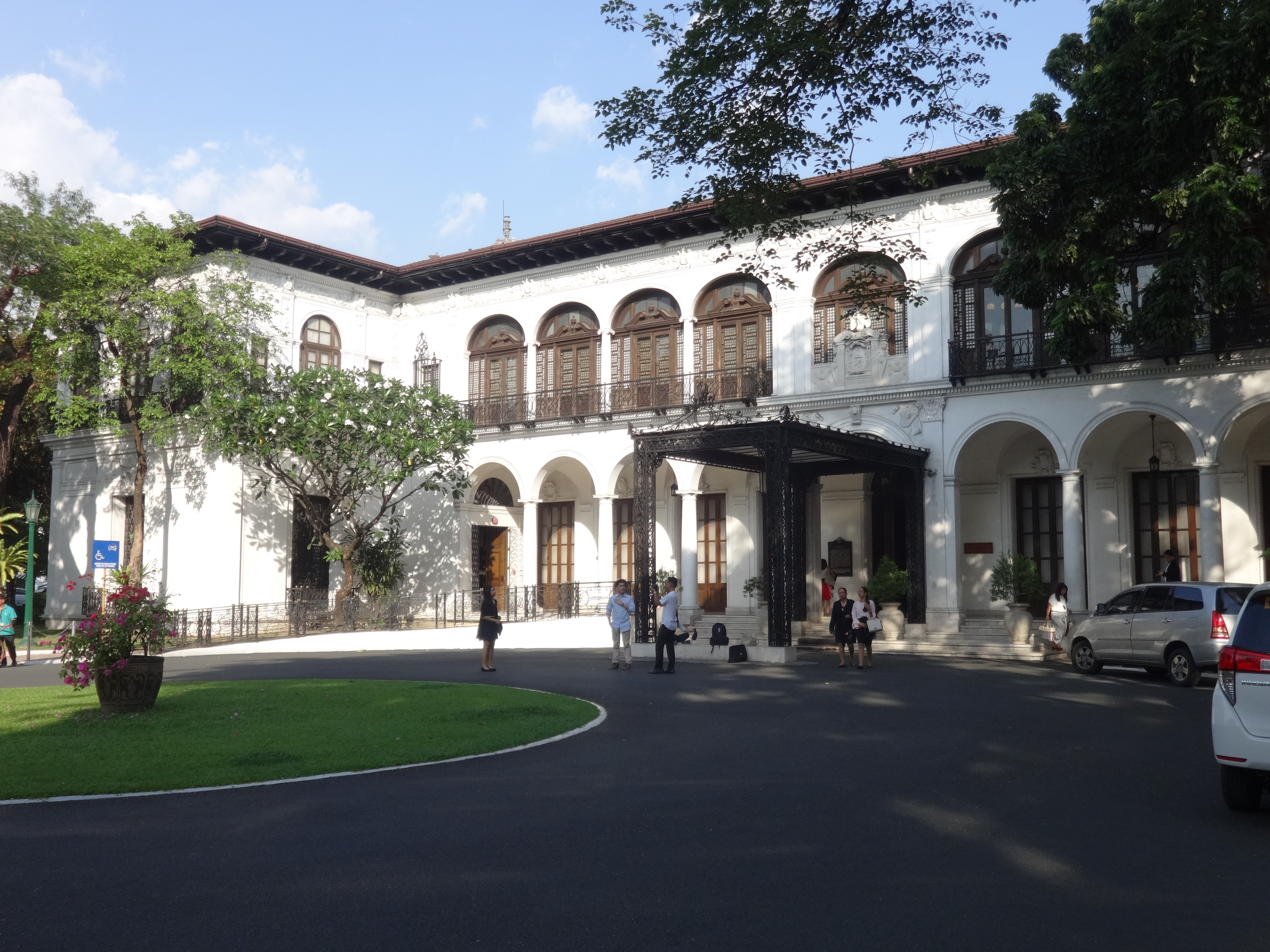
- Interactive map of the Kalayaan Hall area
- Former names: Executive Building; Maharlika Hall

General information
- Location: Manila, Philippines
- Coordinates: 14°35′40.7″N 120°59′40.3″E
- Current tenants: Presidential Museum and Library
- Construction started: 1920
- Completed: 1921
- Renovated: 1937, 1970s

Technical details
- Floor count: 2

Design and construction
- Architects: Ralph Harrington Doane; Tomas Mapua
- Other designers: Isabelo Tampinco; Graciano Nepomuceno exterior and interior ornamentations
- Main contractor: Bureau of Public Works

Renovating team
- Architect: Juan Arellano (1937)
- Other designers: Vidal Tampinco (1937; interior)

The Kalayaan Hall (Filipino: Bulwagang Kalayaan) is a government building within the Malacañang Palace complex in Manila, Philippines. It houses the Presidential Museum and Library.

== History ==
=== As the Executive Building ===
The Kalayaan Hall was built as the Executive Building by Governor General Francis Burton Harrison in from 1920 to 1921 during the American colonial era. It was first fully used by Harrison's successor Leonard Wood. Philippine President Manuel L. Quezon took office in the building in 1935. In 1937, the building's second floor was renovated to accommodate offices of the President, Vice President, the Council of State and the Cabinet. The building would serve as the principal official building of the Malacañang Palace by the succeeding presidents after Quezon until Ramon Magsaysay.

President Elpidio Quirino and Carlos P. Garcia took their oath as president in the Executive Building; on April 17, 1948, and March 18, 1957, respectively. Presidents Garcia and Diosdado Macapagal rarely used the Executive Building for official functions; instead using the Malacañang Palace proper.

=== As the Maharlika Hall ===
In the 1970s, during the administration of President Ferdinand Marcos and under the initiative of his wife and First Lady Imelda Marcos, the central portion of the second floor of the building was demolished to make way for a large room; the room and the building itself was then renamed as Maharlika Hall. It was also in the building's largest room where Marcos formally proclaimed Martial Law over the Philippines on September 23, 1972. In 1986 Marcos was last seen in the building's balcony after his inauguration. Before he and his family were forced to flee from the palace.

=== As the Kalayaan Hall ===
After the People Power Revolution of 1986 which deposed Marcos and installed Corazon Aquino as president, the Maharlika Hall was renamed as the Kalayaan Hall by Aquino's administration as commemoration of the revolution.

The Kalayaan Hall was then used as Office of the Press Secretary until 2002 when it was made the main gallery of the Presidential Museum and Library.

== Architecture and design ==
The Kalayaan Hall is described as an example of Renaissance–Revivalist architecture. The building was constructed by the Bureau of Public Works with involvement of American consulting architect Ralph Harrington, and supervision of Filipino architect Tomas Mapúa. The building's pre-cast ornamentation and carved wooden interiors were made by sculptors Isabelo Tampinco and Graciano Nepomuceno.

The 1930s expansion was overseen by Juan Arellano for the exterior and Vidal Tampinco, the interior.
