= Manila Central Post Office =

Neoclassical building in Manila, Philippines

Coordinates: 14.5955°N 120.9791°E

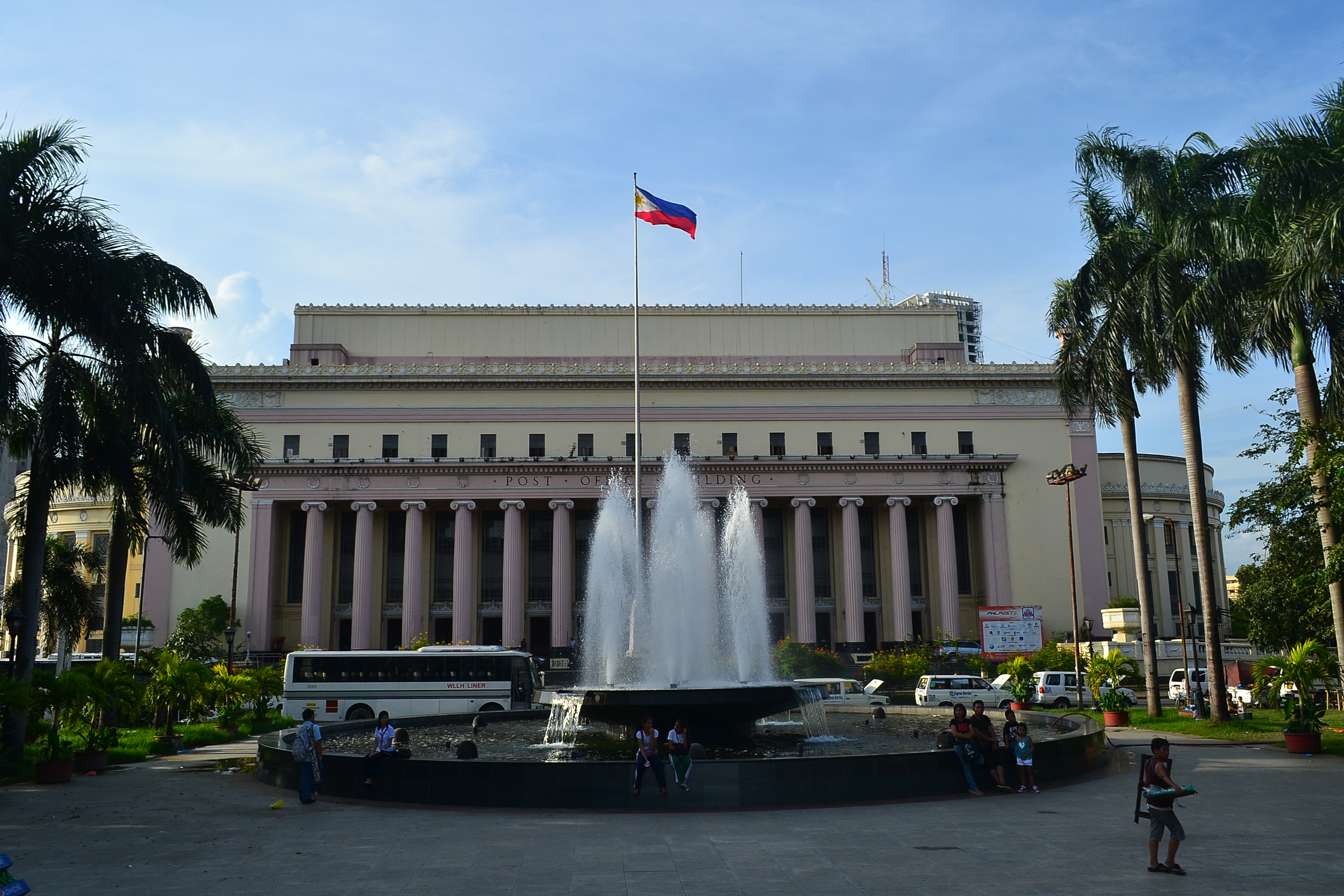
- Post office building in 2012
- Interactive map of the Manila Central Post Office area

General information
- Type: Post office
- Architectural style: Neoclassical
- Location: Liwasang Bonifacio, Magallanes Drive, Ermita, Manila, Philippines
- Current tenants: Philippine Postal Corporation
- Construction started: 1926
- Completed: February 1928
- Owner: Government of the Philippines

Design and construction
- Architects: Juan M. Arellano; Tomas B. Mapua; Ralph Doane

National Historical Landmarks
- Official name: Manila Central Post Office Building
- Type: Building, government institution
- Region: National Capital Region
- Marker Date: June 2, 1994

The Manila Central Post Office, often referred to as the Post Office Building, is the central post office of Manila and serves as the headquarters of the Philippine Postal Corporation (PHLPost). It also houses the country's primary mail sorting and distribution operations.

The building is located along the banks of the Pasig River in Ermita, at the northern end of Liwasang Bonifacio. Its location along the Pasig River was part of the Burnham Plan of Manila, which envisioned the river as a convenient route for the transportation of mail. Its central location, with several avenues converging nearby, made the building readily accessible from all directions.

The original building was designed by Juan M. Arellano, Tomás Mapúa, and Ralph Doane in the neoclassical style. It was severely damaged during World War II in the Battle of Manila and was subsequently rebuilt in 1946 while retaining most of its original design.

Shortly before midnight on May 21, 2023, the building was severely damaged by a major fire that started in the basement and spread throughout the structure.

== History ==
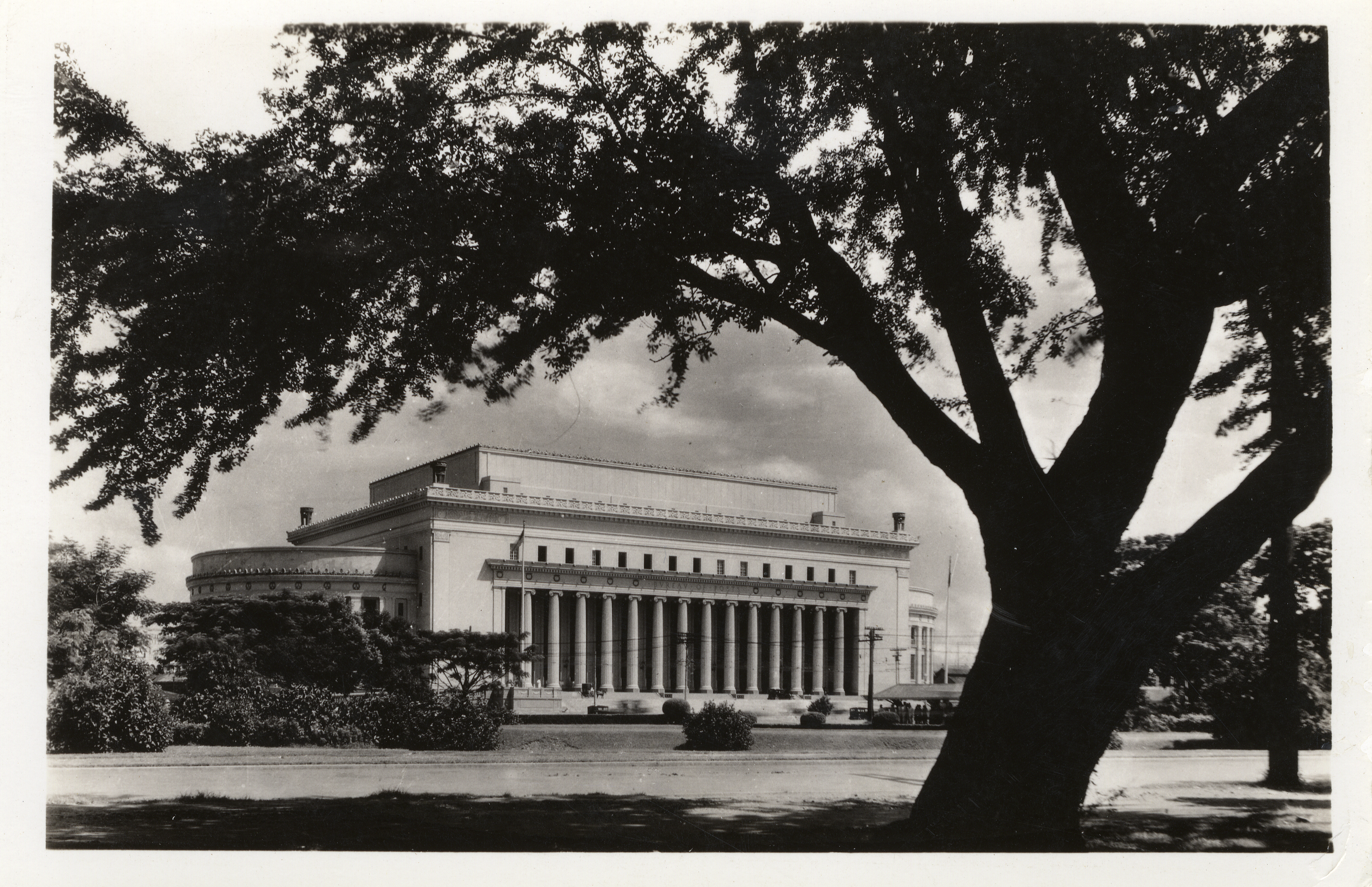
The post office, circa pre-1930

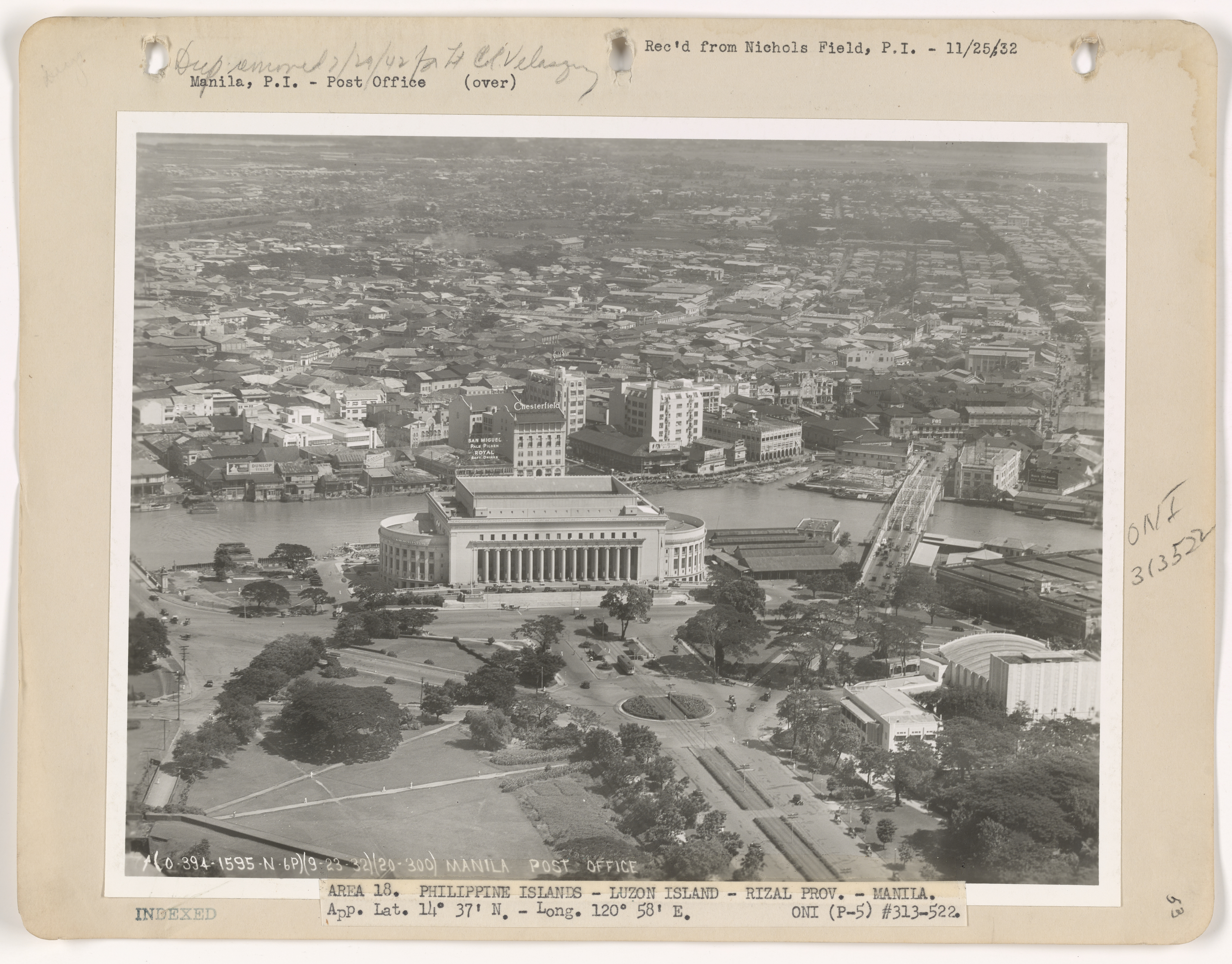
An aerial view of the post office, 1932

Manila's first post office was established in 1767. During the early years of the American occupation, the Philippine Commission created the Bureau of Posts, which later became the Philippine Postal Corporation, through Act No. 462 issued on September 15, 1902.

The current building was designed by Juan M. Arellano, Tomas B. Mapua and Ralph Doane in neoclassical style. The construction of the building began on 1926 under the supervision of the architecture firm of Pedro Siochi and Company.

From August 2, 1920, up to January 9, 1922, the foundation was laid out. The work was put on hold because of the scarcity of funds but was reported to be 56% complete towards the end of the year. The plans on completing the post office building was made public on November 28, 1927, but the awarding of the project happened a year after in 1928. The completion of the building was continued in February 1928.

=== World War II ===
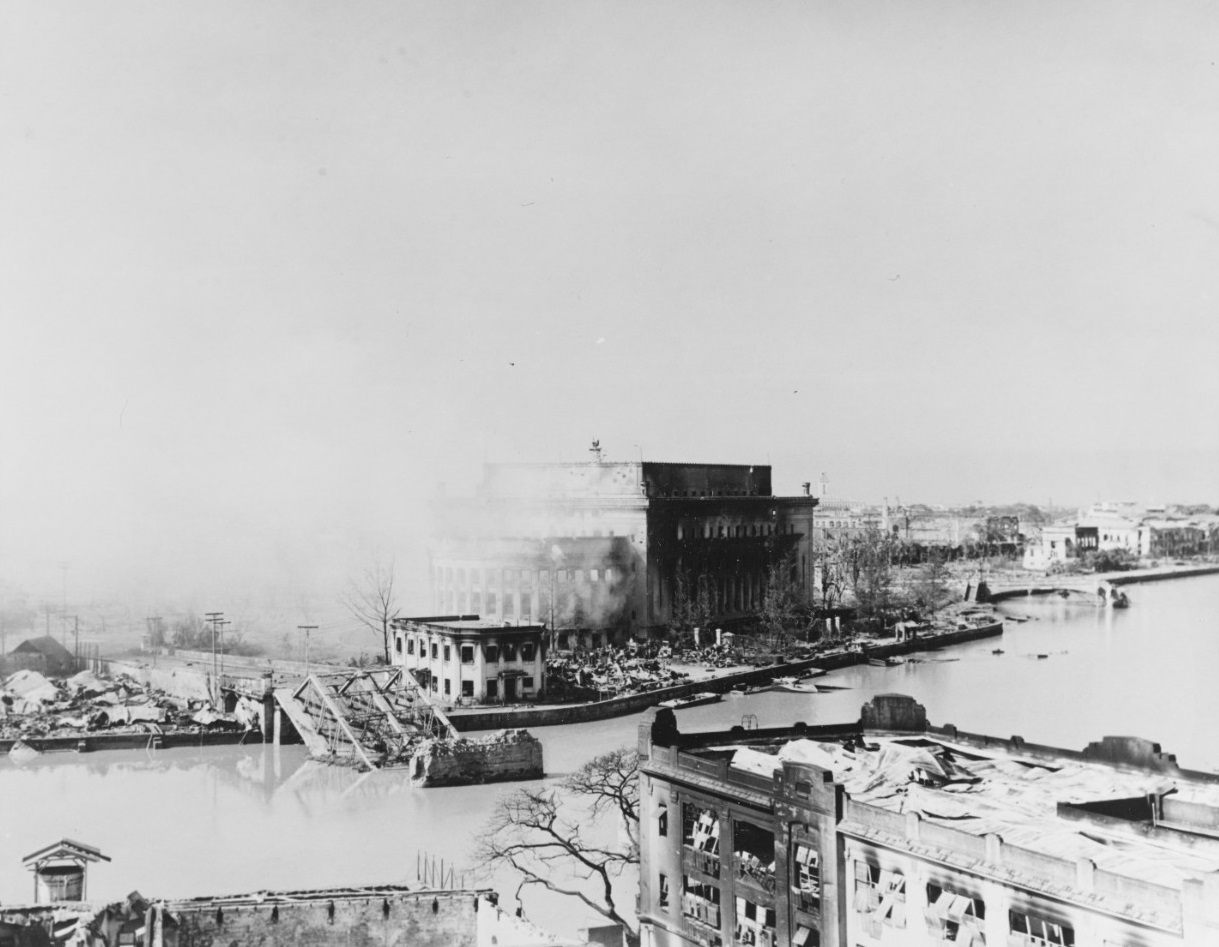
The post office building (center) under attack by U.S. troops, 26 February 1945

The post office was severely damaged in World War II during the Battle of Manila, after it suffered heavy artillery bombardment and saw fierce room-to-room fighting between the Americans and Japanese, who converted the edifice into a fortress by heavily barricading the rooms with sandbags and barbed wires.

The building was a key property for the Japanese as it was earthquake-proof and built with heavily reinforced concrete, making it impervious to direct artillery, tank, and anti-tank fire. On February 19-21, 1945, the post office was hit by artillery fire from the Americans as they bombarded it, and the assault set its interior ablaze. On February 22, the Americans were able to enter the post office through a window and eliminated the Japanese who retreated to the basement. The capture of the post office enabled the Americans to advance their plan in retaking Intramuros from the Japanese.

=== Post-war ===
The building was subsequently rebuilt in 1946, retaining most of its original design. On April 28–29, 1996, the fifth and top floor of the building was gutted by a fire that lasted seven hours and destroyed documents on the Philippine Postal Corporation's finances, which occurred during a Philippine Senate inquiry into alleged anomalies inside the agency.

In the 2000s, there were negotiations between the Philippine government and the Sino Group, which owns the Fullerton Hotel in Singapore, to convert the Post Office building into a five-star hotel. However, then-Tourism Secretary Richard Gordon said the plan fell through due to political instability in the Philippines at the time. Sino Group expressed renewed interest in the project in 2012 but did not push through. A subsequent designation of the area as a heritage zone later ensured that no other structure could be established in the area aside from the post office.

After the Philippine Postal Corporation was placed under the direct supervision of the Office of the President, the building housed a modern and efficient look with its mechanized automatic letter-sorting machine, new Postal Code system, airmail, motorized letter carriers and other facilities.

In 2018, the National Museum of the Philippines declared the Manila Post Office building as an "important cultural property" (ICP), meaning that it had "exceptional cultural, artistic, and historical significance to the Philippines", allowing it to receive government funding for its protection, conservation and restoration.

=== 2023 fire ===
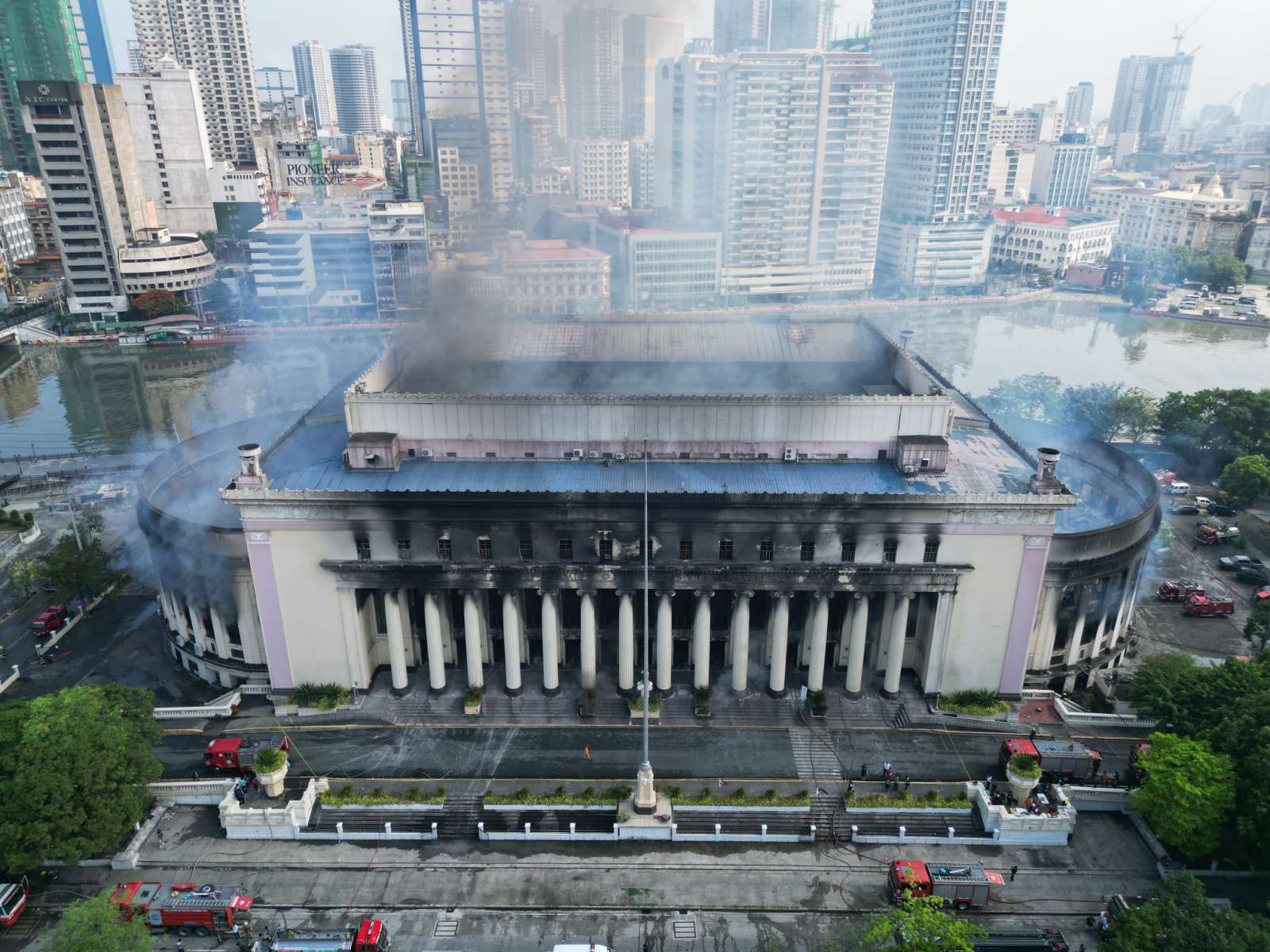
The post office building after the May 2023 fire

On May 21, a massive fire hit the Post Office late in the night and was declared under control more than seven hours after it erupted. The Manila Fire Station said the fire started past 11 pm Philippine Standard Time (PST) in the General Services Office located in the building's basement and spread throughout the building. A subsequent investigation traced the exact source of the fire to a self-discharging car battery in the room.

The fire was placed on general alarm, the highest alarm level, at 5:54 am, the following day, which required the assistance of all available firetrucks in Metro Manila. Over 80 firetrucks arrived at the scene. Firefighters said the light materials inside the building, such as letters and parcels, contributed to the intensity of the fire. The fire was completely put out more than 30 hours after it started, at 6:33 am on the morning of May 23.

The edifice was completely gutted, with Postmaster General Luis Carlos saying that "from the basement to the ground floor all the way up to the fifth floor; the structure was still there, but the ceiling had fallen down." He also said letters, parcels and the postal agency's entire stamp collection were likely destroyed, but clarified that only the mail service in Manila was affected by the fire. He admitted that the building had no water sprinklers, citing its age. The Philippine Statistics Authority later confirmed that some national IDs for delivery in the capital were affected.

The internal wooden structure of the building was burned all the way from the basement to the third floor. Fifteen people, mostly firefighters, were injured, while the amount of damage was estimated to be worth around ₱300 million.

In the aftermath of the fire, the Philippine Postal Corporation said it was transferring the central office's operations to the Foreign Surface Mail Distribution Center in Port Area, Manila, while the business mails service for private corporations was to be moved to the Central Mail Exchange Center in Pasay, near Ninoy Aquino International Airport.

The Manila city government said that the building will be restored and allayed fears that a new building will be built in its place. The National Commission for Culture and the Arts vowed to assist with the restoration. Senator Robin Padilla and members of the House of Representatives Committee on Creative Industry and Performing Arts called for a legislative inquiry into the incident. On 31 May, the Philippine Senate set up a special committee to oversee its rehabilitation.

The building was inspected by the Inter-Agency Task Force on Cultural Heritage on June 8 to assess the structure's integrity before restoration can begin. Inocencio Agoilo, a postman who works at the Post Office, said that restoration may take three to five years. Cleaning of the building began almost five months after the fire, in late October.

=== Post-fire restoration ===
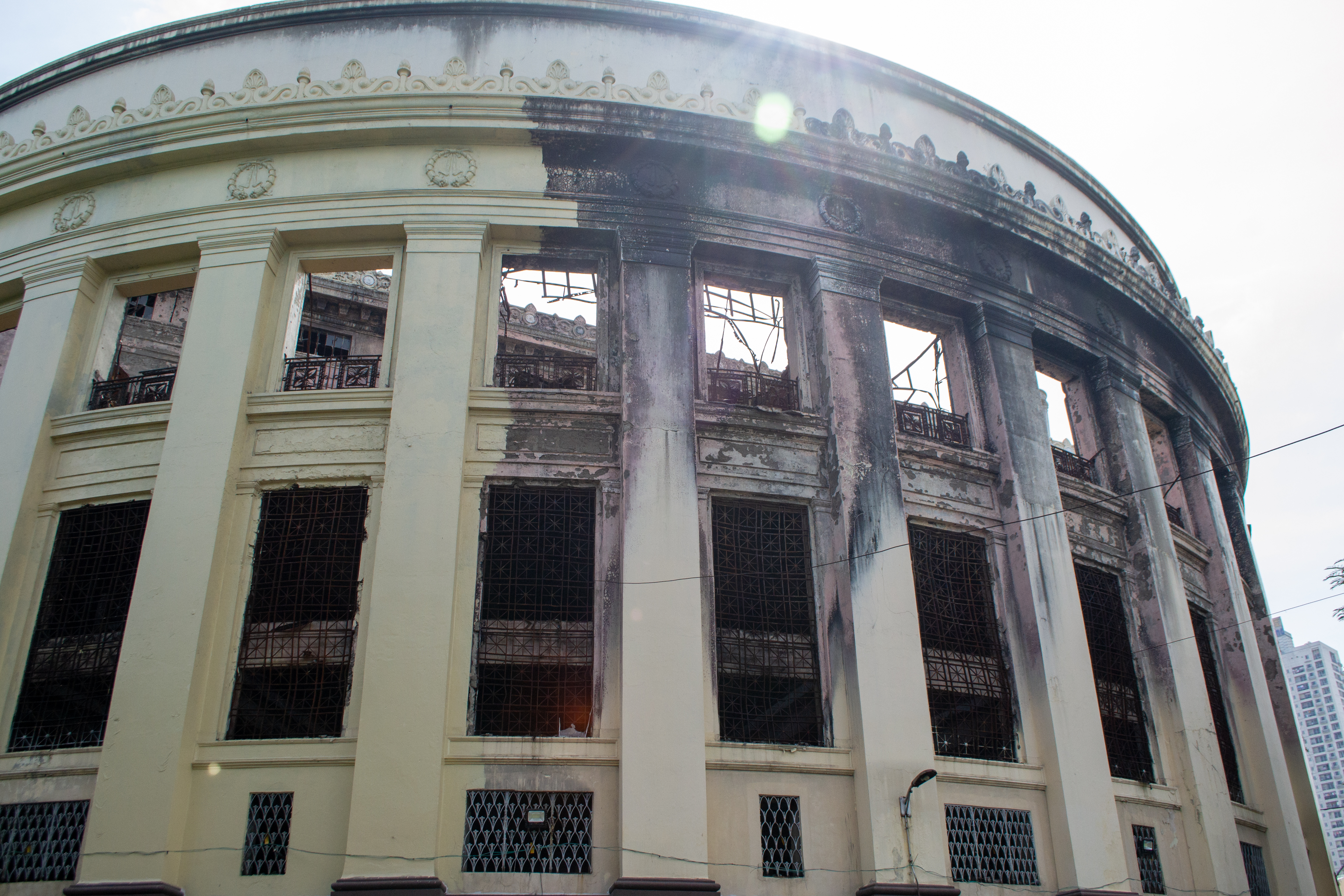
East Wing of the Manila Central Post Office as of June 2025, two years after the fire. The left side of the image shows the front portion of the wing, now repainted following ongoing restoration work.

In December 2023, a memorandum was signed between the Philippine Postal Corporation, the Philippine Institute of Architects (PIA) and Pacific Paint Philippines, Inc. to provide the essential expertise towards the restoration of the building.

The Department of Tourism released an initial of ₱15 million for pre-restoration work in early 2024. On November 5, the Philippine Postal Corporation announced a restoration project amounting to 1.5 billion. Restoration is expected to finish by 2026.

== Architecture ==
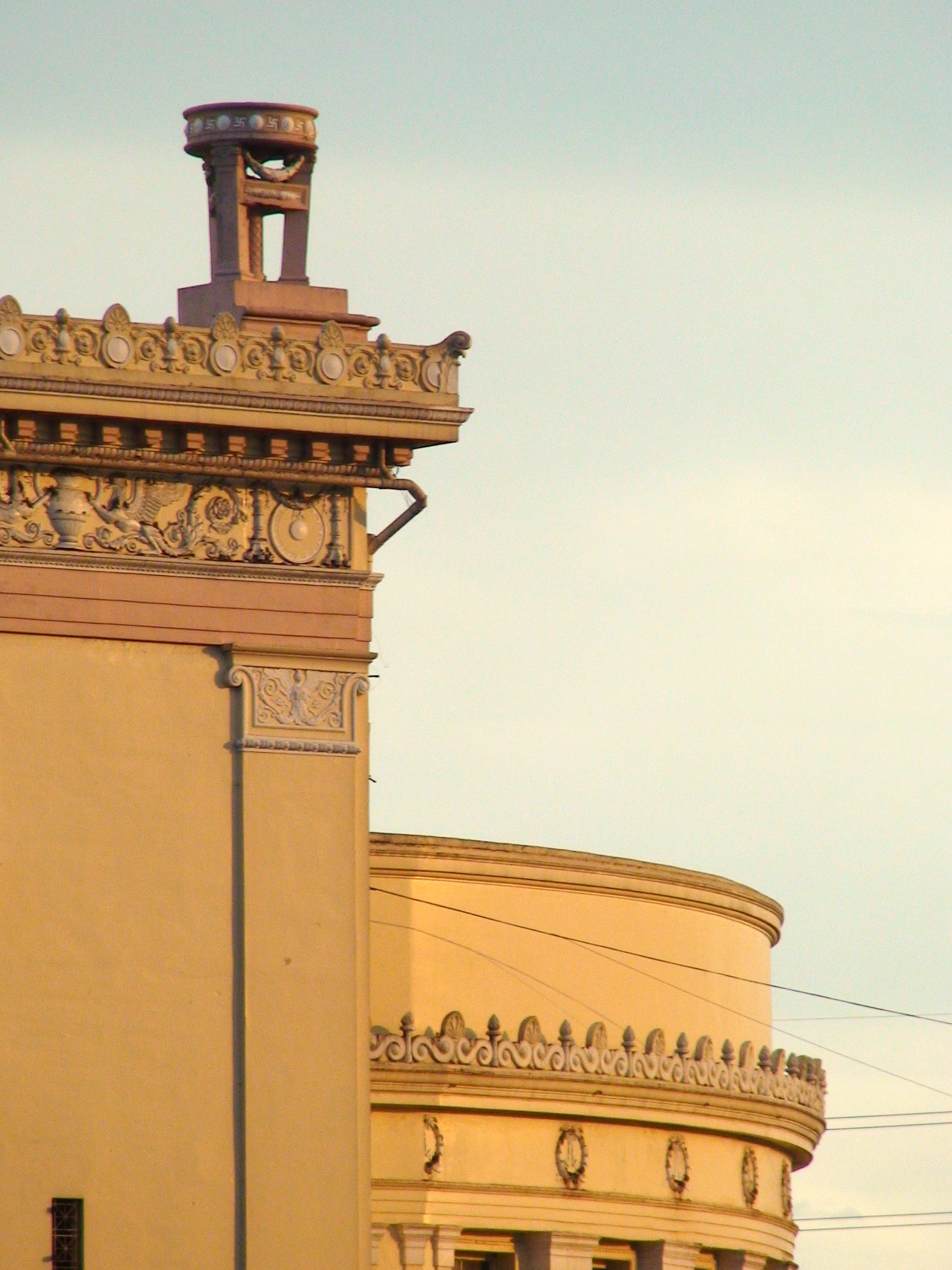
Corner detail of the Post Office Building

The Manila Post Office was strategically located by Daniel Burnham at the foot of Jones Bridge because of two reasons. First was that the Pasig River could be used conveniently as an easy route for delivering mail and secondly, the post office could be accessible from all sides including Quiapo, Binondo, Malate, and Ermita.

Considered to be Juan Arellano's magnum opus, it was designed in the neoclassical style that expressed order and balance. The costs of its construction was worth one million pesos. Fronting the huge, rectangular volume are the 16 Ionic pillars that are lined up above the steps just before entering the lobby. The main body of the building is capped by a recessed rectangular attic storey and flanked and buttressed by two semi-circular wings. Inside, the main lobby has subsidiary halls at each end housed under the semi-circular spaces roofed with domes.

== In popular culture ==
The building and its surroundings were a popular location for the shooting of local films and television serials, such as:

- Pananatili, a Gospel music video by Jesuit Communications.
- Ikaw Lamang Hanggang Ngayon (2002), a romance film starring Regine Velasquez as a postal worker.
- Catch Me, I'm in Love (2011), starring Sarah Geronimo and Gerald Anderson.
- Wansapanataym: Kung Fu Chinito (2015), a fantasy drama used by the finale episode during final battle.
- Hintayan ng Langit (2018), a romance-drama film which used the building's interior as the setting of Purgatory.
- Batang Quiapo (2023), an action-comedy drama series broadcast by Kapamilya Channel.
- Simula sa Gitna, a 2023 Amazon Prime series starring Dolly de Leon, Maris Racal and Khalil Ramos. A spin-off of Hintayan ng Langit, the building was again used as the setting for Purgatory. Filming on the site wrapped up a month before the 2023 fire.

The building was also subjected to a paranormal investigation in the 2021 Halloween special of the news magazine program Kapuso Mo, Jessica Soho, having been claimed by employees to be haunted by ghosts and poltergeists, some of which were believed to be that of Japanese soldiers from the Second World War.

The building was depicted in the Philippine Postal Corporation's "Stamps on Stamps" series released in November 2023.

== Gallery ==
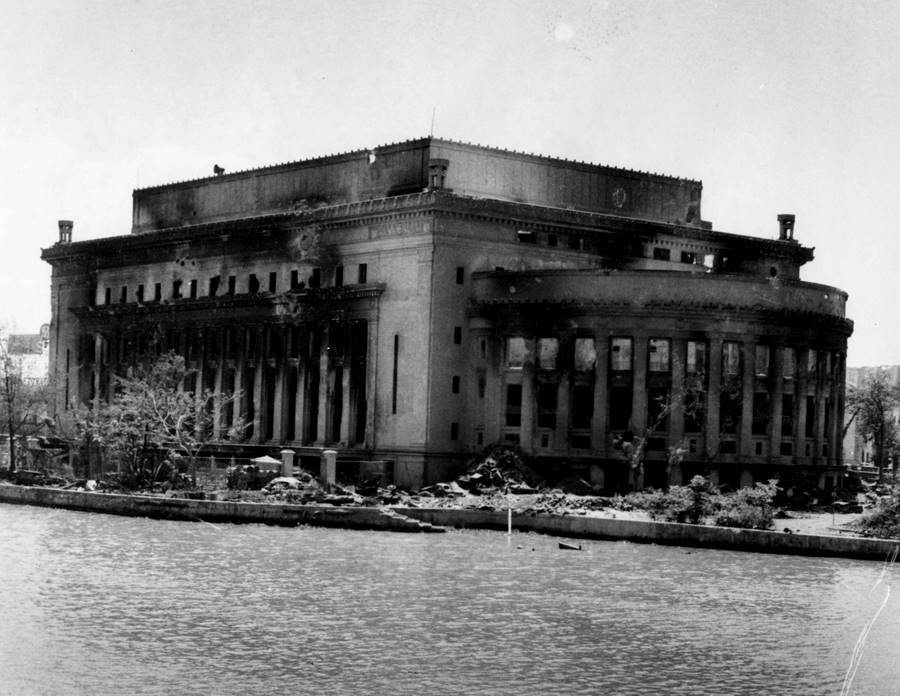
The Manila Central Post Office damaged during World War II (1945)

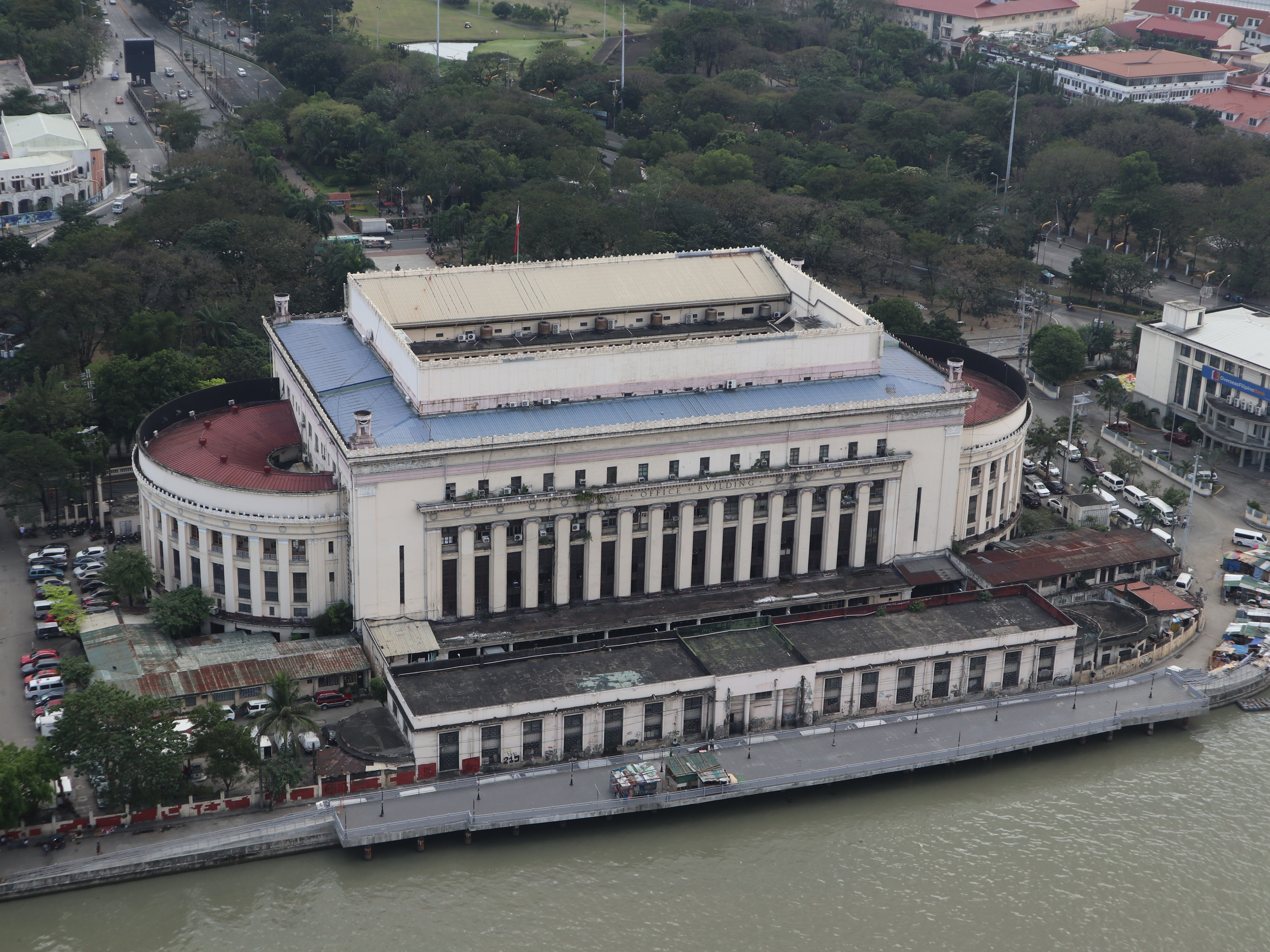
Aerial shot of the Post Office

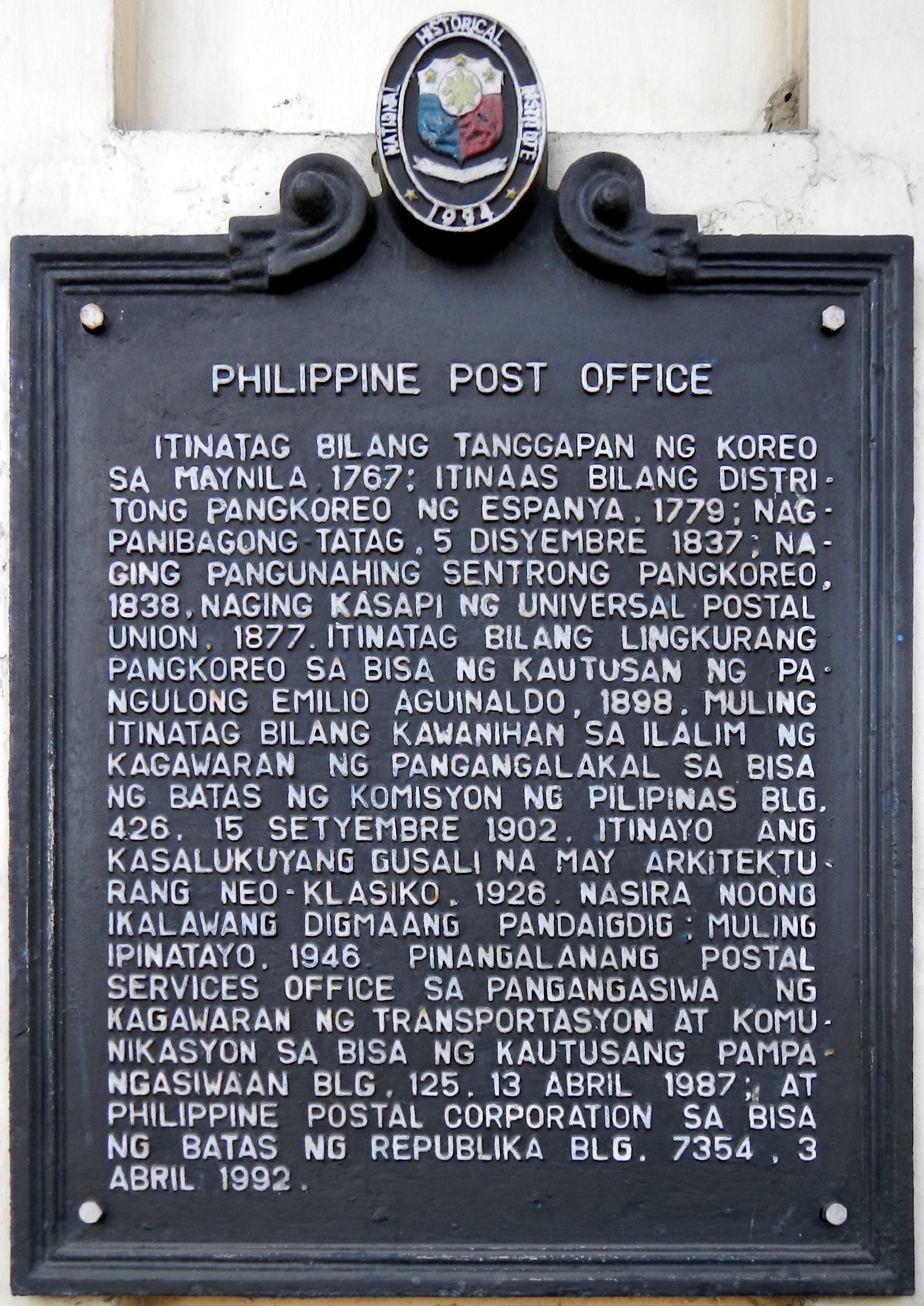
Historical marker installed in 1994

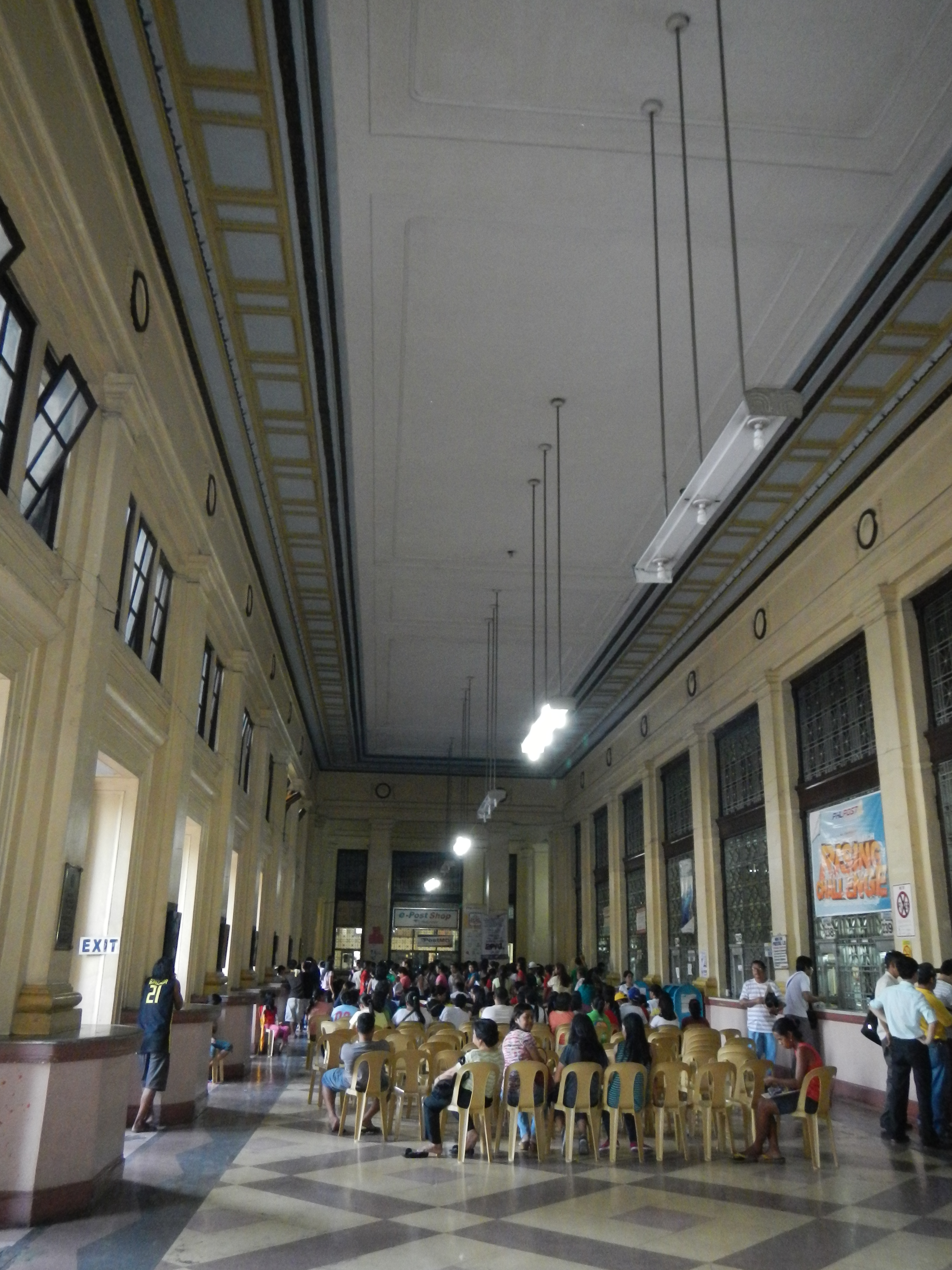
Interior

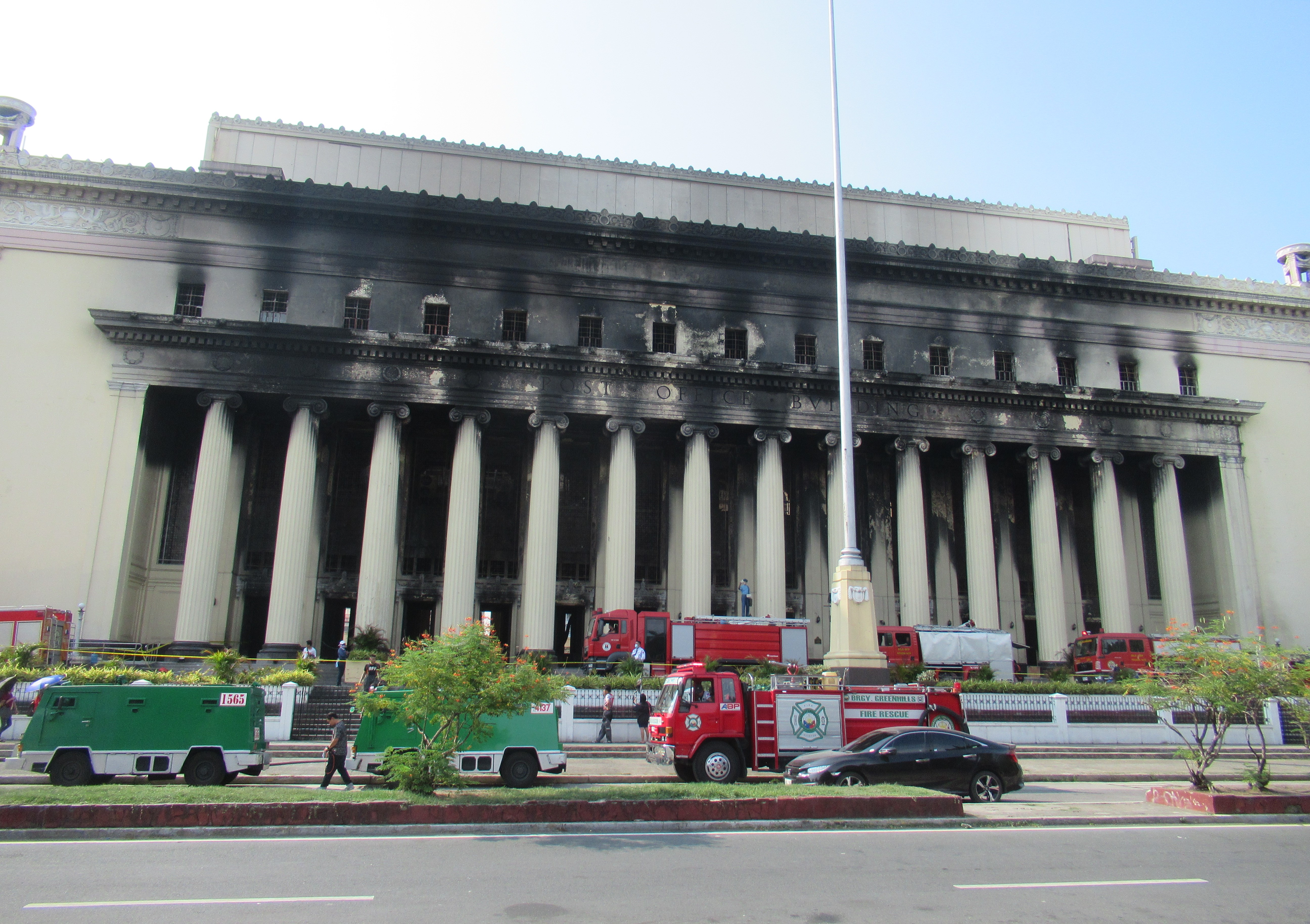
Façade at Liwasang Bonifacio after the 2023 fire
