= Old Cotabato City Hall Museum =

Museum in Cotabato City, Philippines

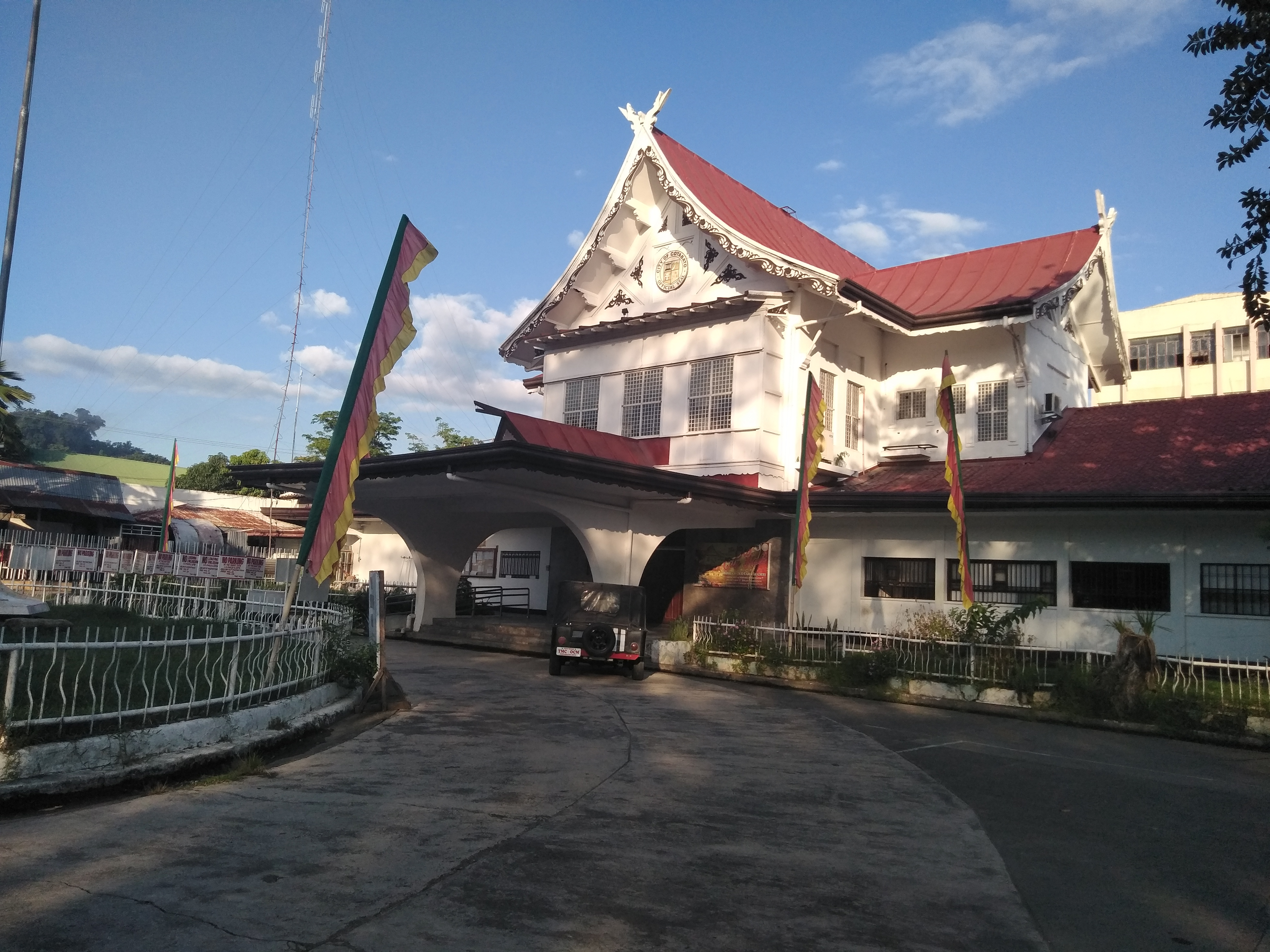
- Cotabato City Museum
- Location: Cotabato City Plaza
- Coordinates: 7°13′26″N 124°14′46″E
- Type: Local museum
- Building details

General information
- Architectural style: Maguindanaon, Neo Vernacular
- Location: Don Roman Vilo St, Cotabato, Philippines
- Completed: 1936
- Renovated: 2016
- Owner: Local Government of Cotabato City

Design and construction
- Architect: Juan M. Arellano

Old Cotabato City Hall Museum is a city museum fronting Rizal Park Plaza in Cotabato City, Philippines. The structure was built in 1940s as the Municipal Hall of former Municipality of Cotabato also served as the visitors information center.

== History ==
The building was built in 1936 as Cotabato Municipal Hall under the leadership of the former Cotabato Mayor Jose Lim. It was renamed as the Cotabato City Hall in the 1960s when the Municipality of Cotabato was recognized as a City.

Designed by the Filipino architect Juan Arellano, the Cotabato Municipal Hall demonstrates vernacular appropriation of Western architectural styles and incorporates the Tausug gable roof and designs inspired by the okir. According to Filipino architect and academic Gerard Lico, Arellano interpreted the okir through Art Deco architecture.

== Exhibits ==
The museum houses the city’s historical artifacts, pioneer families heirlooms, and other noteworthy pieces of history such as vintage photos and books.

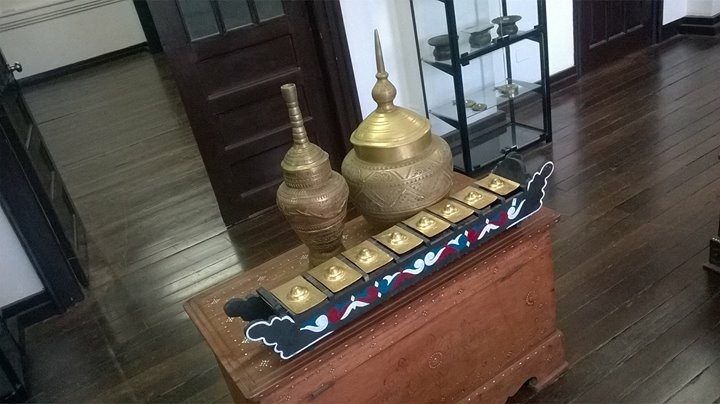
Brass ware, a city product

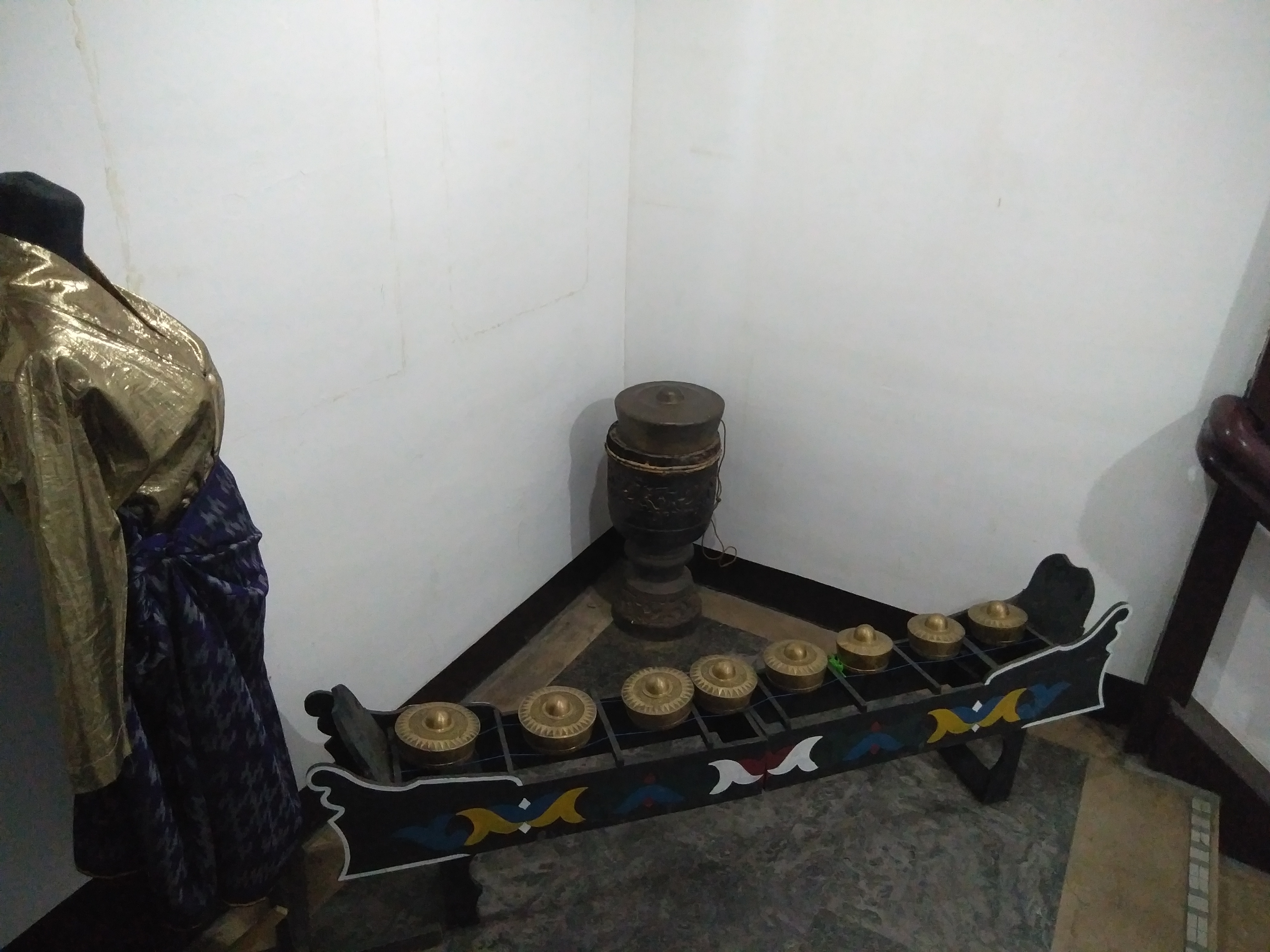
Kulintang, one of the traditional musical instrument in Cotabato

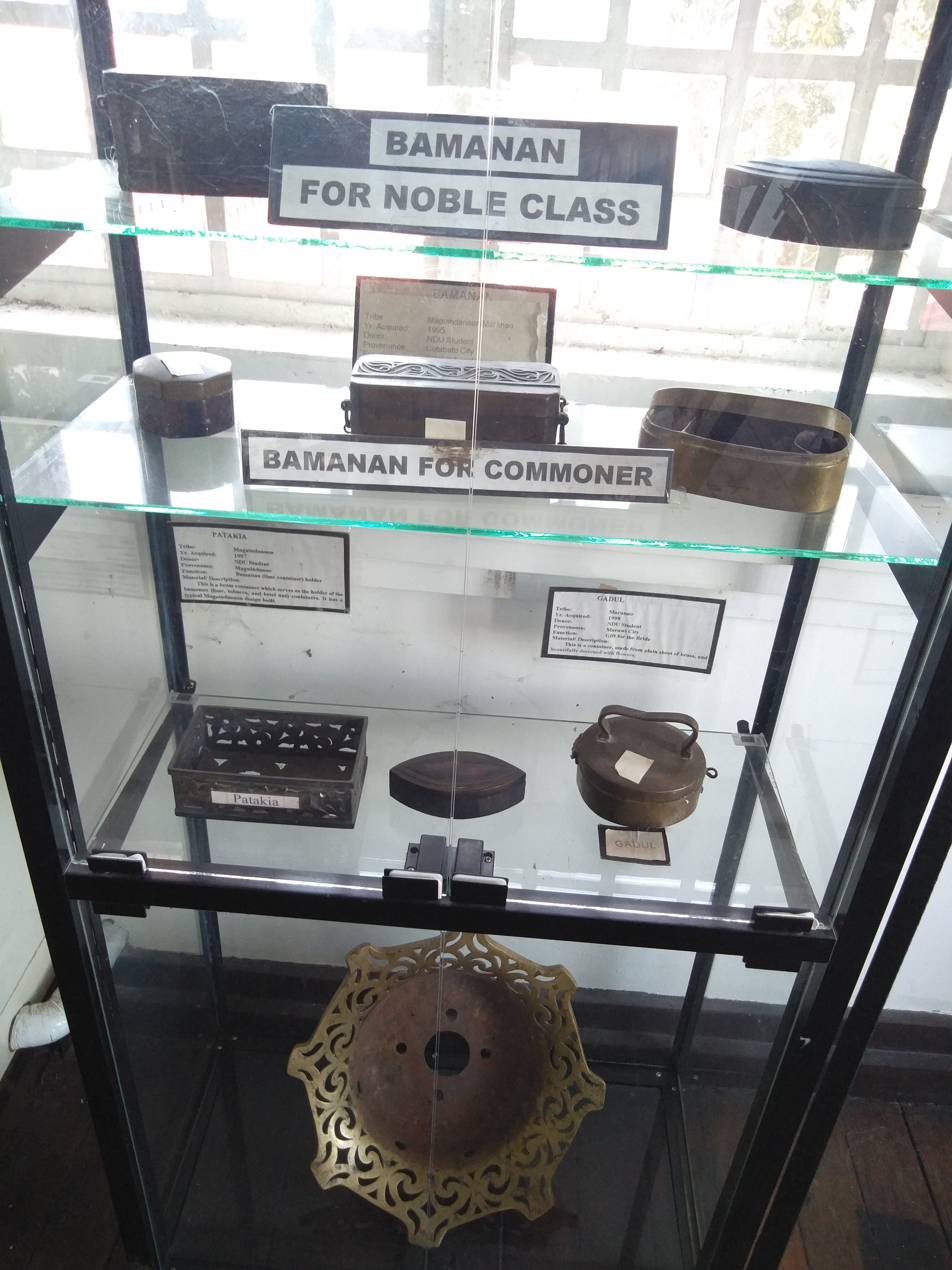
Bamanan

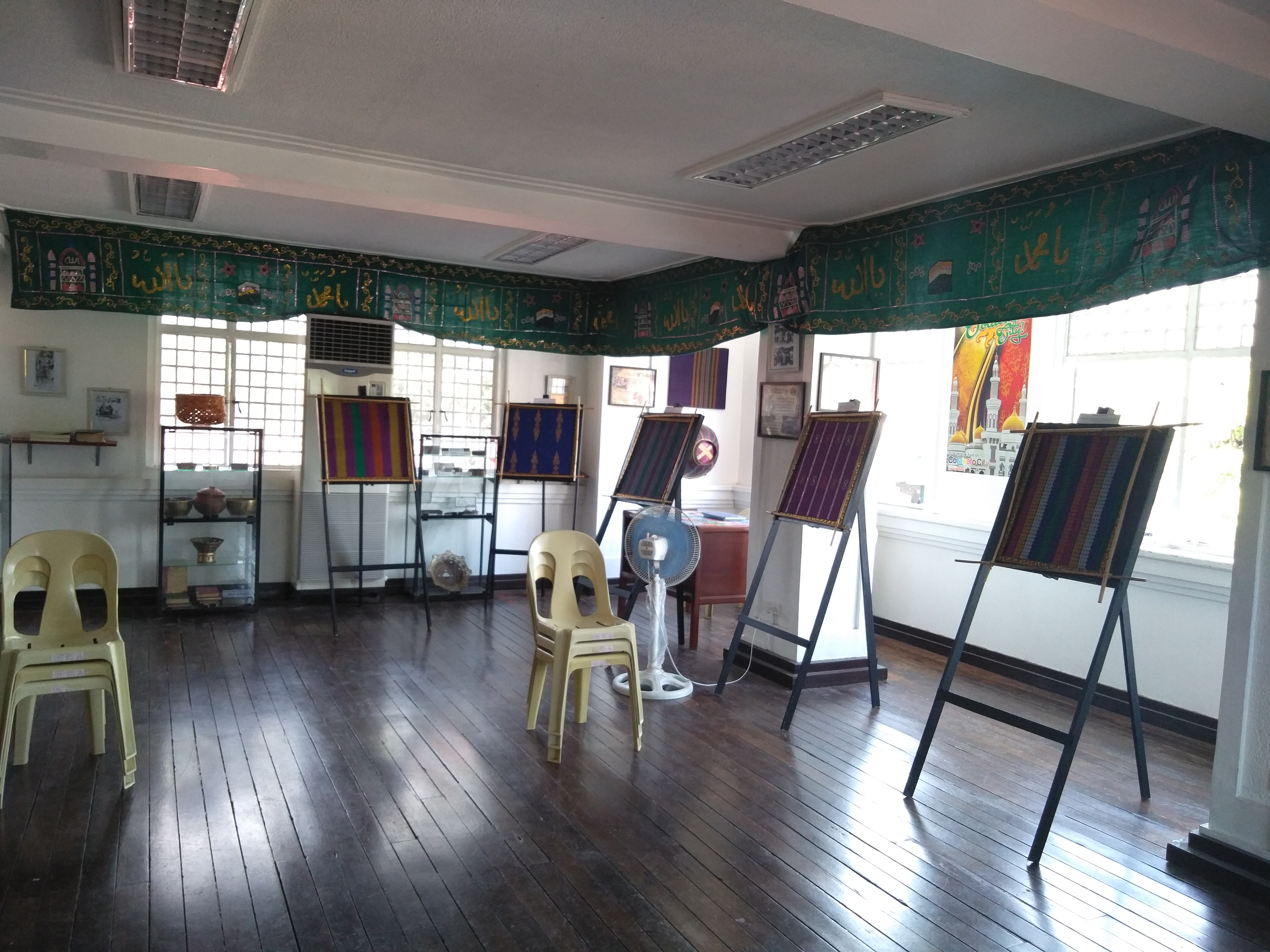
Inaul and artifacts are exhibited on the 2nd floor

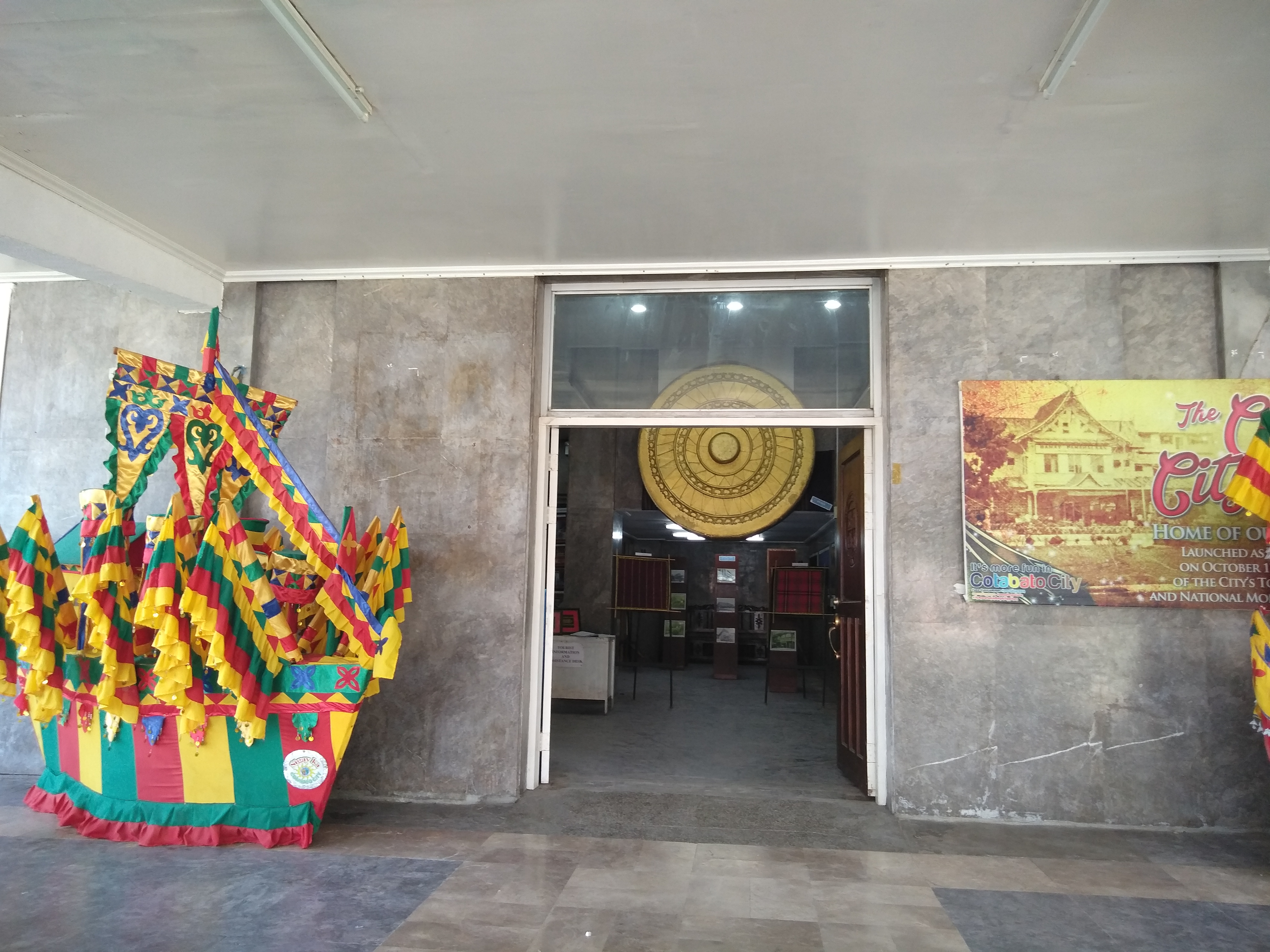
Entrance of the Museum
