= Mapúa Mansion =

Tomas Mapúa Mansion
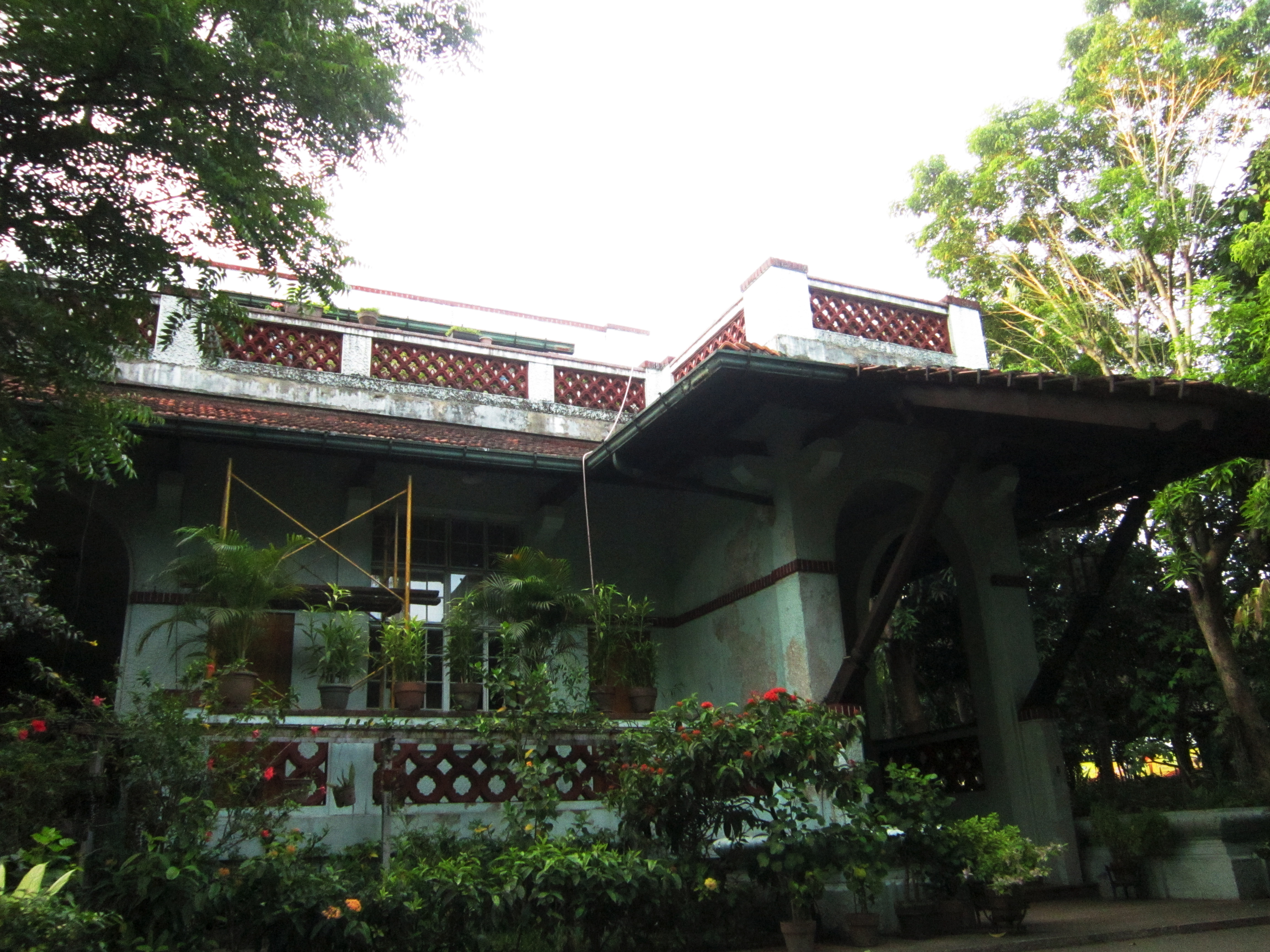
- The Mapúa Mansion
- Nickname: Mapúa Mansion
- Interactive map of Tomas Mapúa Mansion
- Coordinates: 14°32′31.30″N 120°59′58.48″E
- Country: Philippines
- Region: National Capital Region
- City: Pasay
- Barangay: Barangay 86
- Architect: Tomás Mapúa
- Architectural Design: Art Deco
- Year Constructed: 1930

Tomás Mapúa Mansion (Mapua Mansion) is the house built by Don Tomás Mapúa himself. The house is located along the stretch of Taft Avenue (formerly Calle Rizal/ Highway 50) in Pasay.

== History ==
=== Construction ===
After Don Tomas B. Mapúa was sent to the United States in 1903-1911 by the Philippine-American Government to study Architecture in Cornell University, he served in the Bureau of Public Works in 1918-1927. In 1925, he established the Mapúa Institute of Technology. The construction of the mansion was finished in 1930 and according to one of his grandsons, it was a side-by-side project with his fresh graduate apprentices. The architectural style of the mansion follows the then trending Art Deco.

=== During World War II ===
When the war broke out in Manila during the Japanese occupation, the Mapúa Family moved, and fortunately the mansion was spared from air raids and landmines. According to his grandson, it was also used as a Japanese headquarters. During the Liberation of Manila, the mansion was also spared from the casualties of the war.

=== Post War ===
After the World War II, Don Tomás and his family reacquired and reoccupied the mansion.

=== Marcos Era ===
The mansion withstood the construction of new infrastructure adjacent to its area such as the Manila Light Rail Transit System.

=== Present Day Status ===
To date, the mansion is undergoing restoration works by the Philippine Institute of Architects and its affiliate organizations. Notably, almost all of the elements and details of the house are still intact and were the original works of Don Tomás. It is surrounded with flowers and different collection of plants where they feel like they are living in a year of 50's in the middle of the big city surrounded with modern infrastructures.
