= Bulacan Provincial Capitol =

Seat of the provincial government of Bulacan in the Philippines

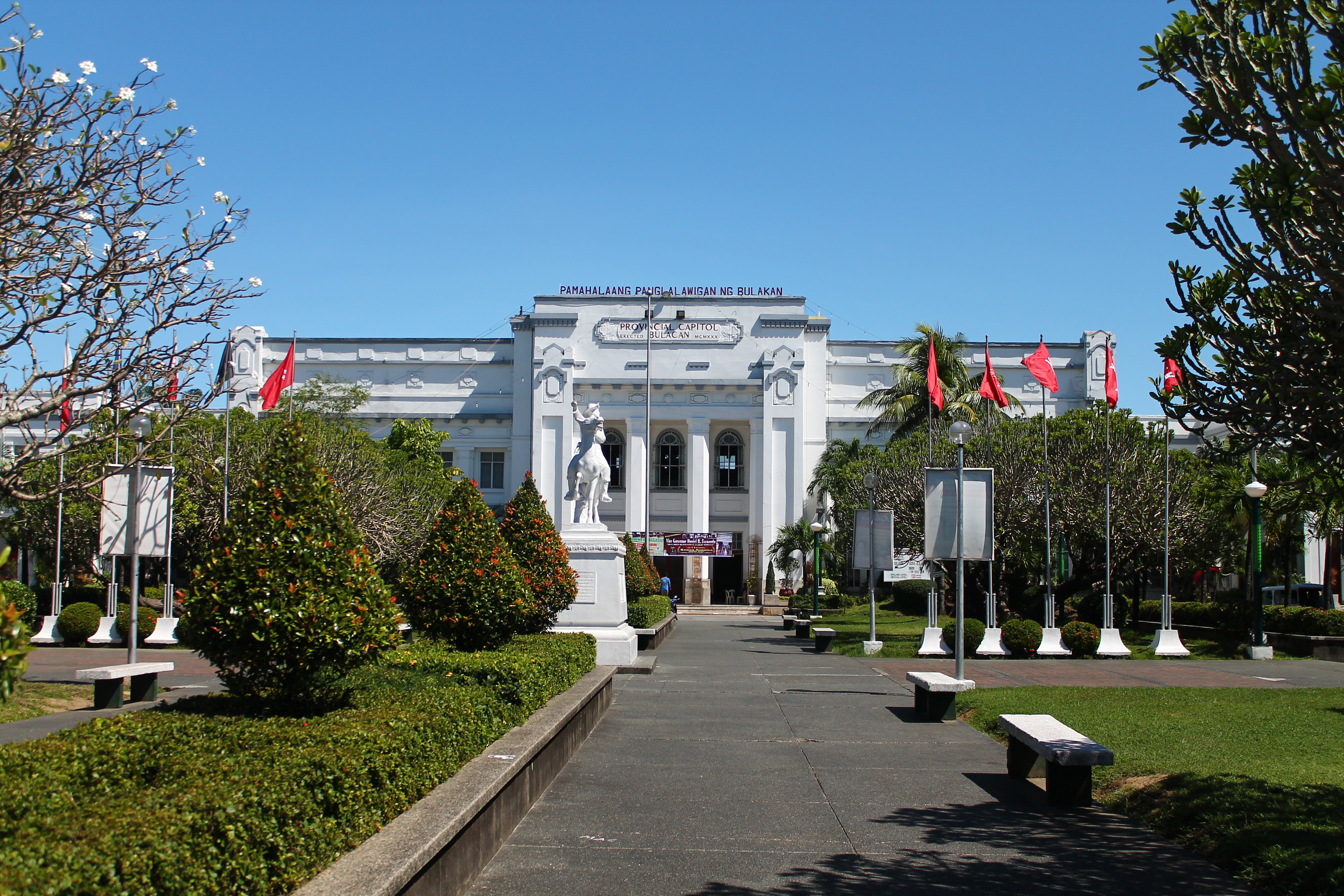

- Location within Bulacan Location within Philippines

General information
- Architectural style: Art deco
- Location: Malolos, Bulacan, Philippines
- Coordinates: 14°51′23″N 120°48′52″E
- Current tenants: Office of the Governor; Provincial Government of Bulacan
- Completed: 1930
- Renovated: 2018

Design and construction
- Architect: Juan Arellano

The Bulacan Provincial Capitol is the seat of the provincial government of Bulacan in the Philippines.

== History ==
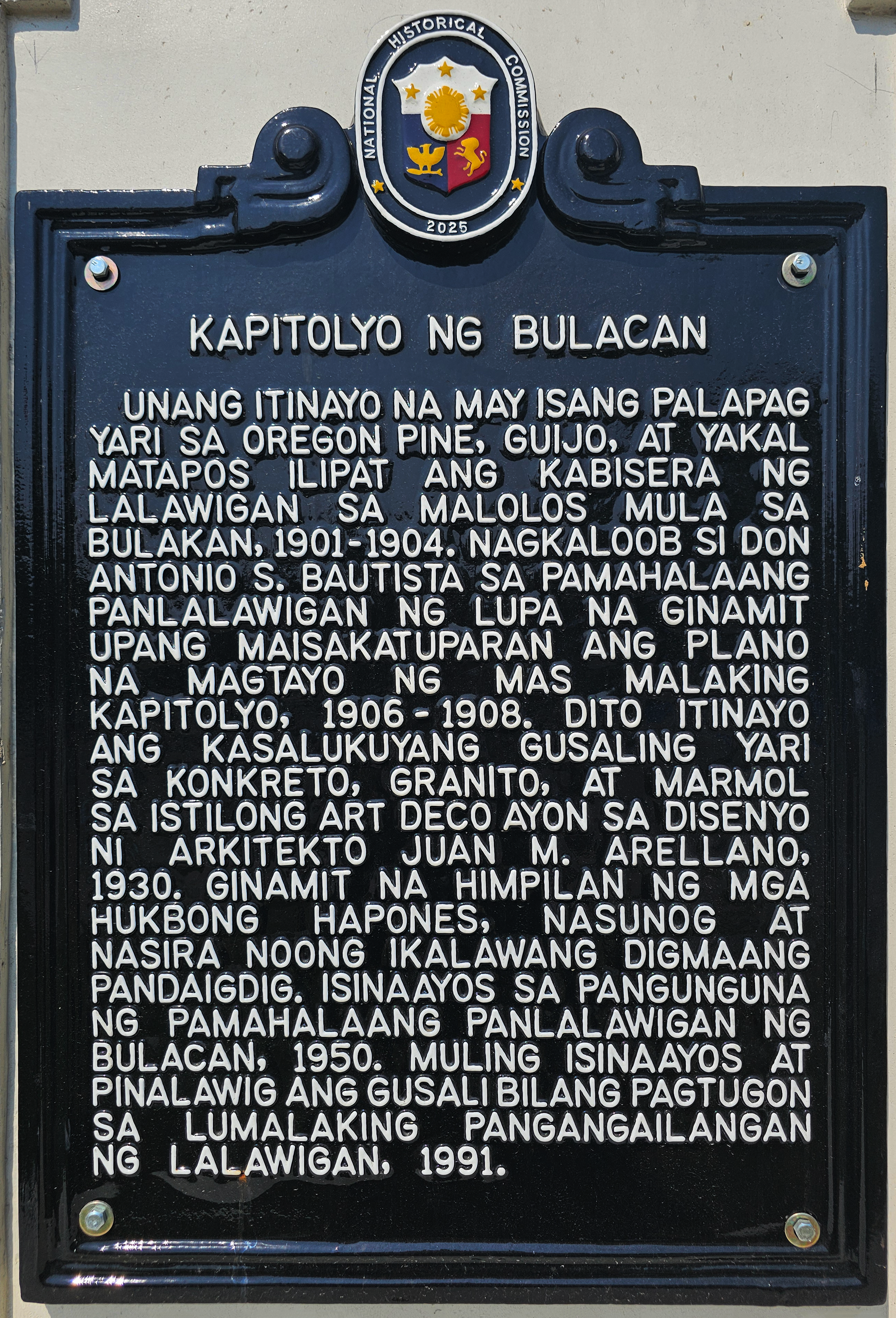
National historical marker installed in 2026

The Bulacan Provincial Capitol was built in 1930 during the administration of Bulacan Governor José Padilla Sr. on a parcel of land donated by Spanish American Antonio Bautista. The capitol was destroyed during World War II but was rebuilt in June 1950 under the tenure of Governor Fortunato Halili.

The building was closed in August 2017 for a major renovation which was completed in 2018 under Governor Wilhelmino Sy-Alvarado.

== Architecture and design ==
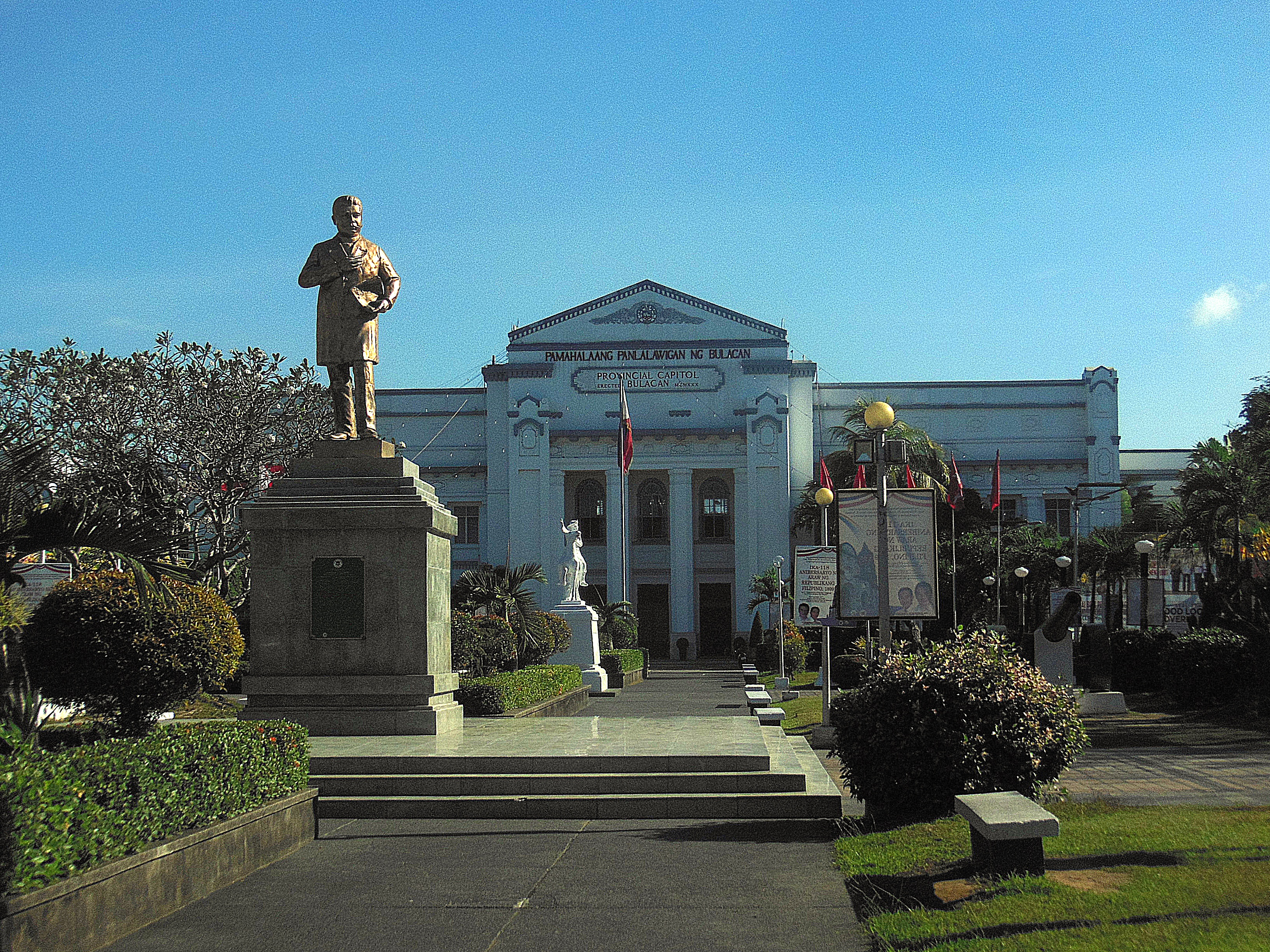
The capitol prior to the 2018 renovation

The Bulacan Provincial Capitol was designed by Filipino architect Juan Arellano and is an example of Art deco architecture. The capitol's compound is named as the Antonio S. Bautista Provincial Capitol Compound. The 2018 renovation saw the installation of a LED board on top of the capitol's signage and the conversion of its triangular pediment to a parapet.
