= Presidential Museum and Library (Philippines) =

Archives agency in the Philippines

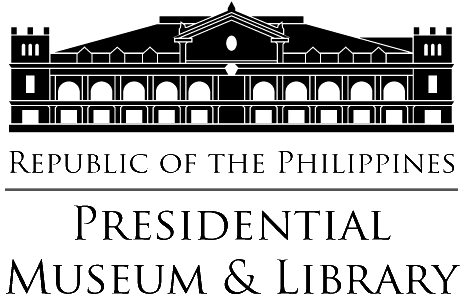

Museum and library institution overview
- Formed: 2004 (as the Malacañang Museum)
- Preceding agencies: Presidential Museum; Malacañang Library
- Headquarters: Kalayaan Hall, Malacañang Palace complex, Manila, Philippines
- Parent agency: Office of the President
- Website: museums.gov.ph

The Presidential Museum and Library, formerly the Malacañang Museum, is a museum and library institution of the Philippine government. An agency under the Office of the President, it is tasked responsible for preserving, managing, and promoting the history and heritage of the Philippine Presidency as well as the Malacañang Palace.

== History ==
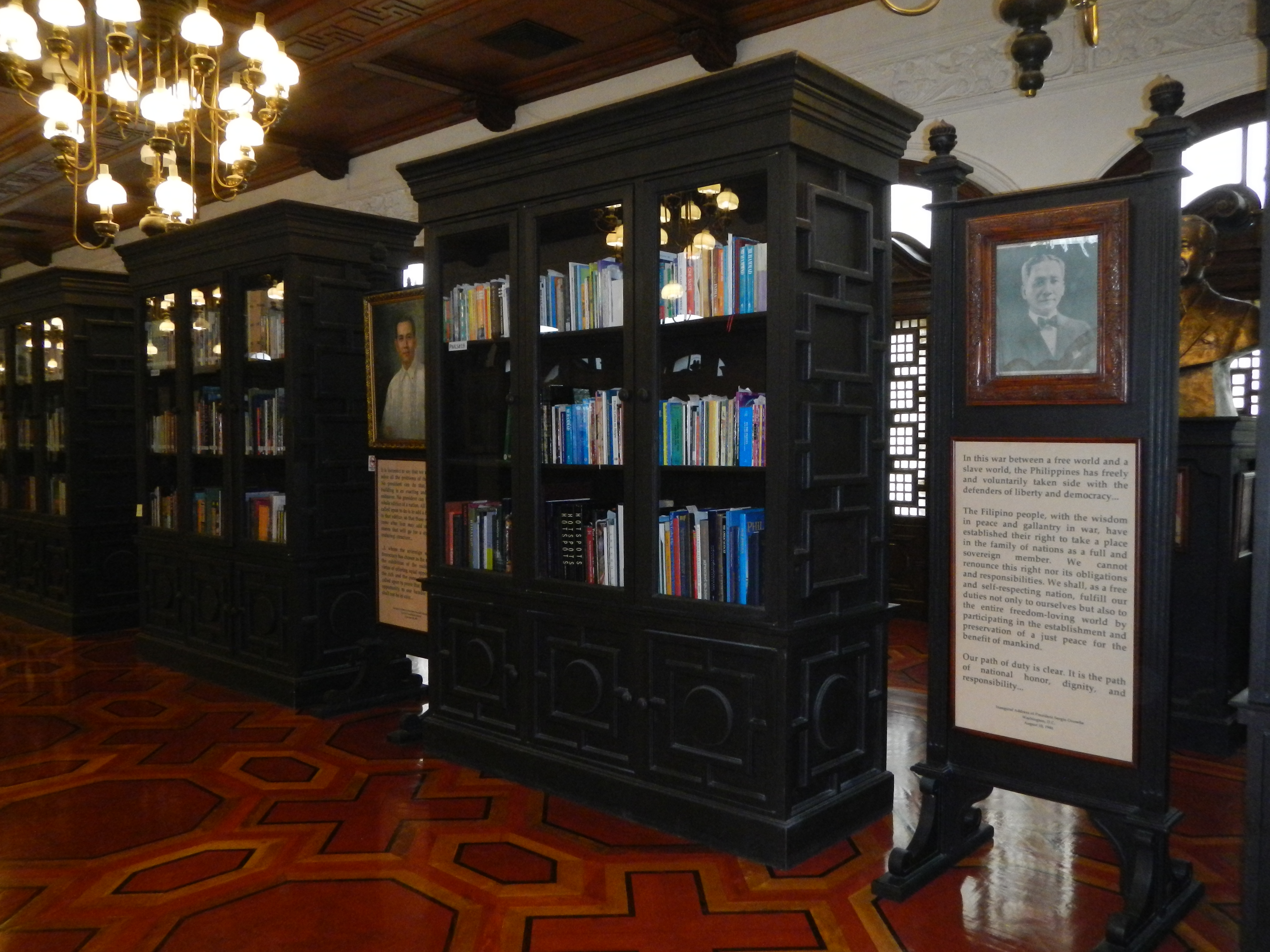
Main gallery of the museum at Kalayaan Hall

The Presidential Museum and Library was preceded by two entities; the Malacañang Library and the Presidential Museum.

=== Predecessor agencies ===
==== Malacañang Library ====
The Malacañang Library was established in 1946 as the Malacañan Palace Library as part of the Philippine Commonwealth Government. It is a general reference library for use by official and employees of the palace; as well as students and researchers. In January 1950, it was placed under the Office of Public Information; but was made a separate entity at a later date. After this period, two separate distinctions arose to refer to the collections of the Malacañang Palace. "Malacañan Palace Library" came to refer to collections inside the palace which is used by the President themselves while the "Malacañang Library" became the designation for the general circulation library which is available for use by Office of the President employees to the general public. The Malacañang Library started with a collection of around 400 volumes.

A separate library, known as the Presidential Library, was established in 1973. The Presidential Library, which was hosted at the ground floor of the Maharlika Hall (now the Kalayaan Hall) is a birthday gift by First Lady Imelda Marcos to her husband President Ferdinand Marcos. The library also served as a clearing house for President Marcos' documents. The Presidential Library was dissolved in 1997, with its collections absorbed by the Malacañang Library.

==== Presidential Museum ====
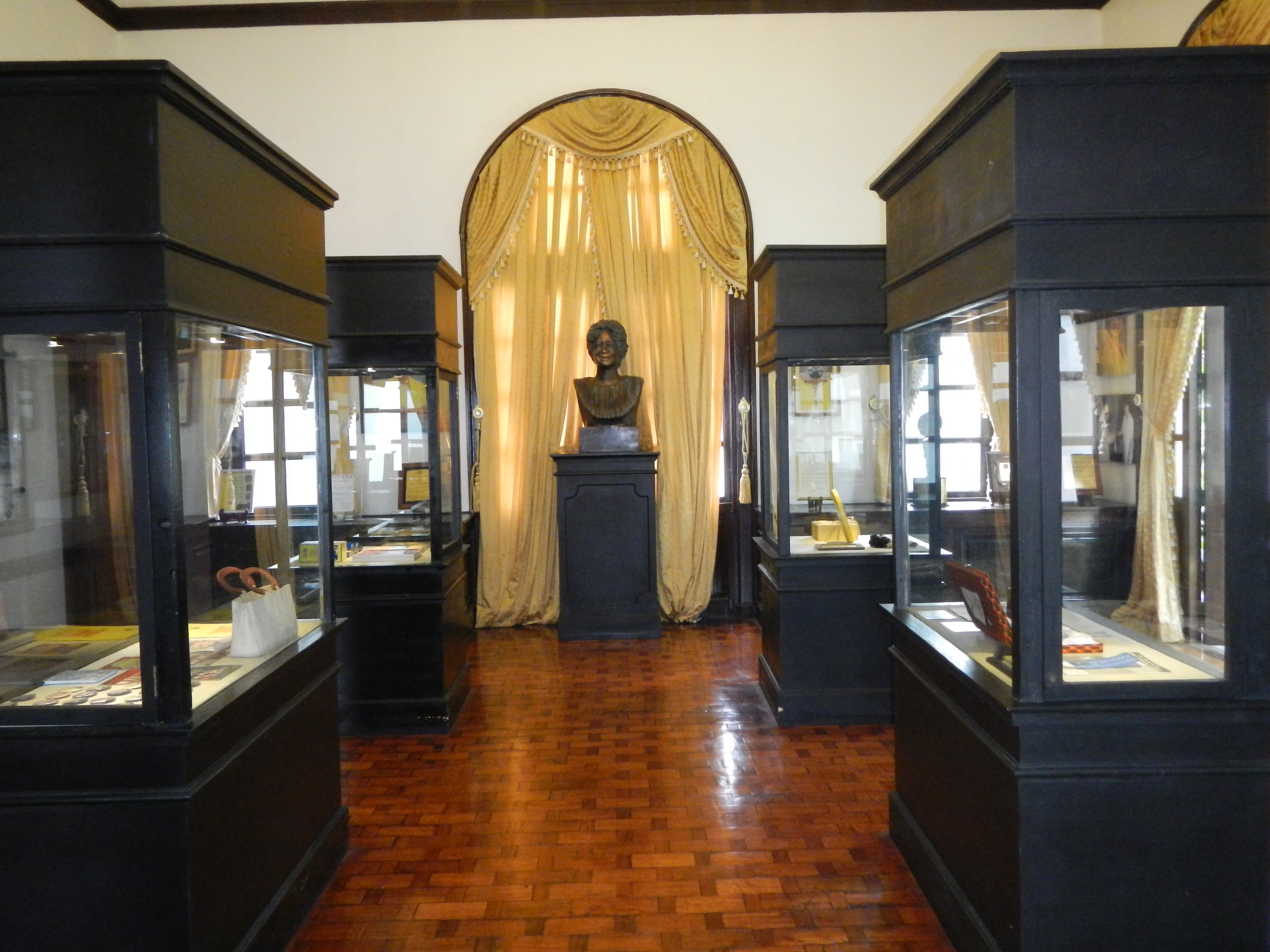
Exhibits at the museum

The Presidential Museum was established during the administration of President Diosdado Macapagal which was meant to "collect, identify, and display relics" collected during the respective incumbencies of Philippine presidents. It was also tasked to document the history of the Malacañang Palace and for training of the Presidential Guards Battalion as tour guides for tourists visiting the palace. Tours to the palace was halted in the 1970s due to security reasons. The museum was relegated to a repository of artworks under the president's custody.

The role of the Presidential Museum was transferred to the Museo ng Malacañang Foundation, a private organization by virtue of Memorandum Order NO. 37 issued by the administration of President Corazon Aquino on September 10, 1986. Public tours inside the palace was continued as means to showcase the extravagance and opulence of the Marcos administration. The Malacañang Heritage Foundation took over from the Museo ng Malacañang Foundation during the administration of President Fidel V. Ramos which reorganized the museum's exhibits and made collections of past presidents as the main feature. Under President Joseph Estrada's tenure, the museum was once again made an artwork repository and public tours were halted once again.

The Presidential Museum was once again revived after Gloria Macapagal Arroyo took office; making the Kalayaan Hall, the building adjacent to the palace proper as the museum's display area and office.

=== Presidential Museum and Library ===
The Presidential Museum and the Malacañang Library was merged into one institution in 2004 during President Gloria Macapagal Arroyo's term. The combined entity, which became known as the Malacañang Museum, was placed under the supervision of the National Museum of the Philippines in 2010 during the term of President Benigno Aquino III for museological and related policy purposes. The Malacañang Museum was placed under the supervision and control of the Presidential Communications Development and Strategic Planning Office within the same year and was renamed as the Presidential Museum and Library. The PML in 2017 was made accessible online through virtual tours, in collaboration with the Presidential Communications Operations Office and the Google Arts & Culture.

== See also ==
- Presidential Car Museum
- National Museum of the Philippines
