= Graciano Nepomuceno =

Filipino sculptor

- Born: 18 December 1881; Manila, Captaincy General of the Philippines
- Died: 30 December 1974 (aged 93); Mandaluyong, Rizal, Philippines
- Education: Liceo de Manila
- Known for: Santo figures, woodcarvings
- Style: religious, genre

In this Spanish name, the first or paternal surname is Nepomuceno and the second or maternal family name is Francisco.

Graciano T. Nepomuceno y Francisco (18 December 1881 – 30 December 1974) was a Filipino sculptor and woodcarver known for santo figures and genre sculptures.

== Background ==
Graciano T. Nepomuceno was born in Trozo area in Binondo, Manila on 18 December 1881. Trozo was one of the more affluent portions of Manila at the time of his birth where many of its residents have better formal education and virtually all are fluent in Castilian Spanish.

Nepomuceno initially pursued a career in painting, studying under Miguel Zaragoza at the Liceo de Manila. He switch to sculpting and became an apprentice of Ciriaco Arevalo. Arevalo is a Filipino sculptor who won a gold medal in an exhibition in Spain for his work dubbed as El Baguio.

From the late 19th century until the early 1900s, Nepomuceno often collaborated with fellow sculptor and musician, Bonifacio Arévalo. After this period, Nepomuceno became more independent and did works in wood and cement medium which are primarily used as ornaments in building facades. Renowned Filipino architect Arcadio Arellano was a frequent employer of Nepomuceno. He then focused on genre sculptures and later on portraiture. He became known for direct carving in molave wood, among his contemporaries. He was also noted for his santo artworks.

His work, a wooden figure of a boy playing sipa, was also part of the sculpture event in the art competition at the 1948 Summer Olympics.

Among his reputed works is the figure of St. Francis in Quiapo Church and a sculpture of Filipino nationalist José Rizal.

He died on 30 December 1974.
