= Juan M. Arellano =

Filipino architect

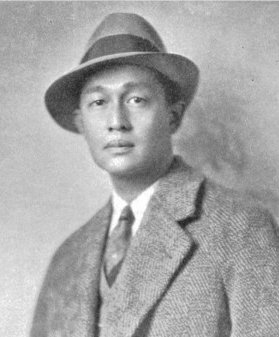
- Born: Juan Marcos Arellano y de Guzmán; April 25, 1888; Tondo, Manila, Captaincy General of the Philippines
- Died: December 5, 1960 (aged 72); Metro Manila, Philippines
- Other name: Juan Arellano
- Education: Drexel Institute; Ateneo de Manila University
- Occupation: Architect
- Organization: Philippine Institute of Architects
- Known for: Neoclassical and Art Deco buildings
- Spouse: Natividad Ocampo
- Parent(s): Luis C. Arellano; Bartola de Guzmán
- Awards: Medal of Merit Awardee, Philippine Institute of Architects
- Honours: 5th President, Philippine Institute of Architects Precursor of the 1st Architectural Exposition in Asia

Juan Marcos Arellano y de Guzmán (April 25, 1888 – December 5, 1960), was a Filipino architect, best known for Manila's Metropolitan Theater (1935), Legislative Building (1926; now houses the National Museum of Fine Arts), the Manila Central Post Office Building (1926), the Rizal Memorial Sports Complex (1934), the Central Student Church (today known as the Central United Methodist Church, 1932), the old Jaro Municipal Hall (1934) and the Old Iloilo City Hall (1935) in Iloilo, the Negros Occidental Provincial Capitol (1936), the Cebu Provincial Capitol (1937), Dumaguete Presidencia (1937), the Bank of the Philippine Islands Cebu Main Branch (1940), Misamis Occidental Provincial Capitol Building (1935), Cotabato Municipal Hall (1940), the Jones Bridge during the pre-war era and the Bahay Pangulo (1930s) in the Malacañang Palace.

== Life and works ==
Juan M. Arellano was born on April 25, 1888, in Tondo, Manila, Philippines to Luis C. Arellano and Bartola de Guzmán. Arellano married Natividad Ocampo on May 15, 1915. He had eight children, Oscar, Juanita, Cesar, Salvador, Juan Marcos, Luis, Gloria and Carlos.

He attended the Ateneo Municipal de Manila and graduated in 1908. His first passion was painting and he trained under Lorenzo Guerrero, Toribio Antillon, and Fabian de la Rosa. However, he pursued architecture and was sent to the United States as one of the first pensionados in architecture, after Carlos Barreto, who was sent to the Drexel Institute in 1908; Antonio Toledo, who went to Ohio State; and Tomás Mapúa, who went to Cornell.

Arellano went to the Pennsylvania Academy of the Fine Arts in 1911 and subsequently transferred to Drexel to finish his bachelor's degree in Architecture. He was trained in the Beaux Arts and subsequently went to work for George B. Post & Sons in New York City, where he worked for Frederick Law Olmsted Jr.

He then returned to the Philippines to begin a practice with his brother, Arcadio. He later joined the Bureau of Public Works just as the last American architects, George Fenhagen and Ralph H. Doane, were leaving. He and Tomás Mapúa were then named as supervising architects. In 1927, he took a study leave and went to the United States where he was greatly influenced by Art Deco architecture.

In 1930, he returned to Manila and designed the Bulacan Provincial Capitol and notably the Manila Metropolitan Theater, which was then considered controversially moderne. He continued to act as a consulting architect for the Bureau of Public Works where he oversaw the production of the Manila's first zoning plan. In 1940, he and Harry Frost created a design for Quezon City, which was to become the new capital of the Philippines.

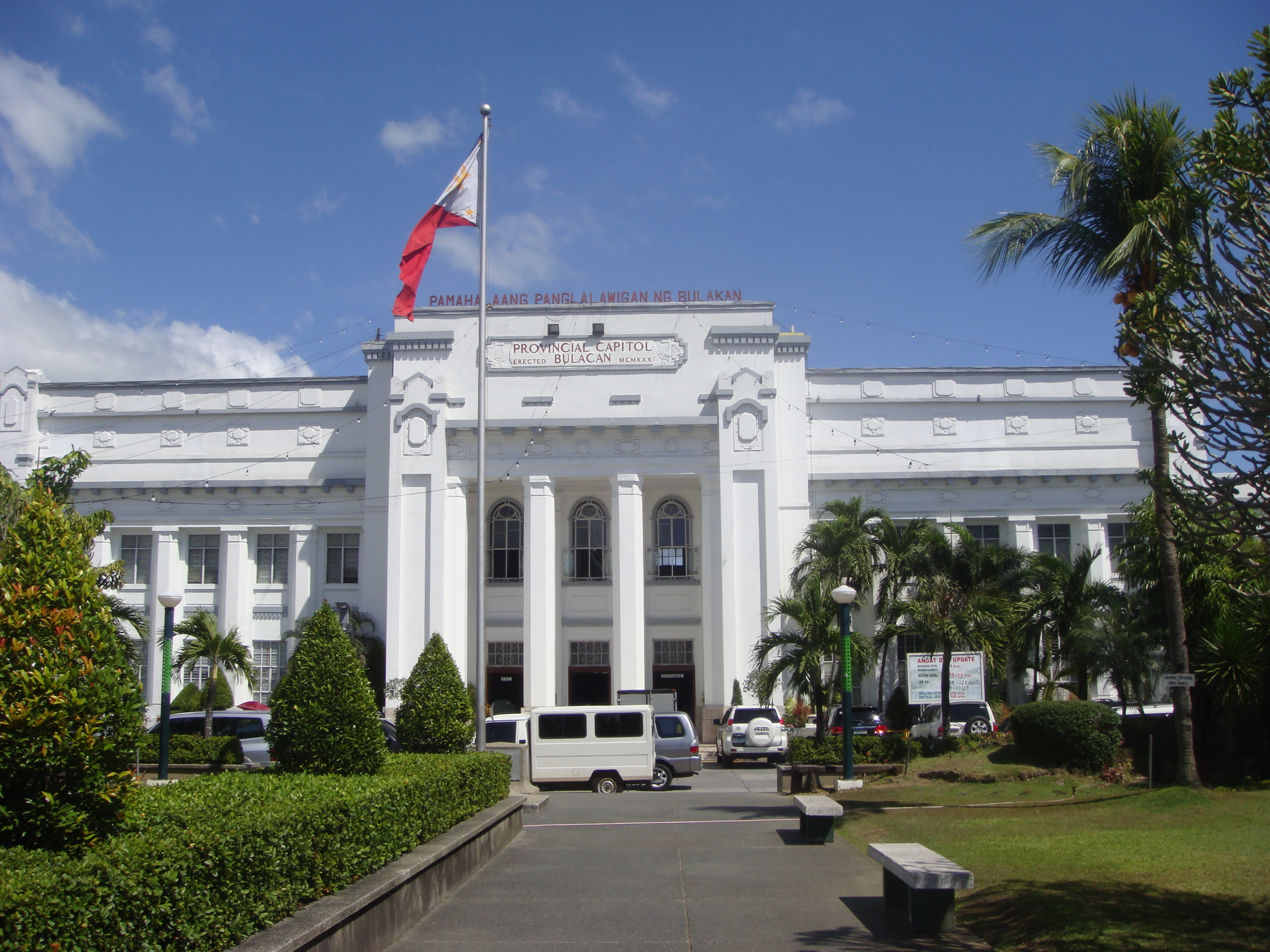
Bulacan Provincial Capitol in Malolos built in 1930 designed by Juan Arellano

It was during that time that he designed the building that would house the United States High Commission to the Philippines, later the Embassy of the United States in Manila. He designed a demesne along the edge of Manila Bay, which featured a mission revival style mansion that took advantage of the seaside vista. The Americans instead opted for a federal-style building that ended up overpriced and uncomfortable.

During World War II, the Legislative Building and Jones Bridge, were totally destroyed and the Post Office Building was severely damaged. While these structures were all reconstructed, his original designs were not followed and were considered poor replications.

Arellano retired in 1956 and went back to painting. In 1960, he exhibited his work at the Manila YMCA.

== Death ==
He died at the age of 72 on December 5, 1960.

== See also ==
- Culture of the Philippines
1. Alcazaren, Paulo (Nov 12, 2005), "Juan M de Guzman Arellano : Renaissance Man", The Philippine Star.
2. National Historical Commission of the Philippines: JUAN MARCOS G. ARELLANO (1888-1960) Outstanding Architect
