= Philippine Institute of Architects =

Architectural society in the Philippines

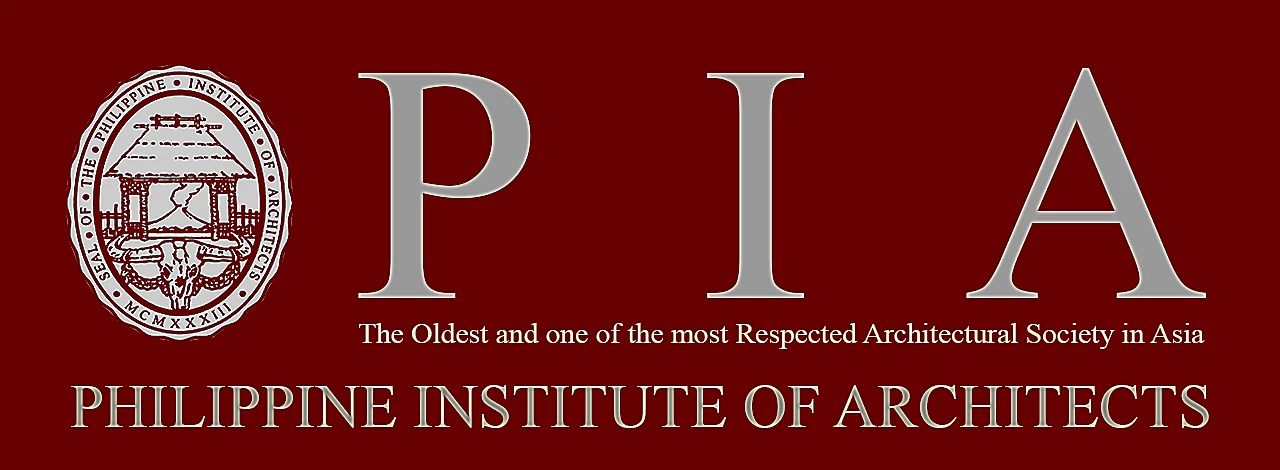
- Abbreviation: PIA
- Formation: January 19, 1933; 93 years ago
- Founded: January 19, 1933
- Founder: Juan F. Nakpil
- Legal status: Institution
- Current National President: Arch. Daniel Terence Yu, FPIA
- Remarks: Oldest existing architectural society in the Philippines and in Asia
- Formerly called: AiAAF, PAS, PIAP

The Philippine Institute of Architects (PIA) is an architectural society in the Philippines and is the oldest architectural society in Asia. It is composed of noble men and women from the architectural profession of the Philippines. It was founded by renowned architects in 1933 whose ultimate endeavor is the professional development of architecture in the Philippines.

The PIA once served as the Philippine Section and founding member of the Union Internationale des Architectes, the International organization for architects from 1950 until 1991 until its membership was then passed on to the United Architects of the Philippines.

== History ==
=== Timeline ===
- 1921- Tomas Mapua, member, became the first registered architect with the Professional Regulation Commission license number 00001.
- 1925- Tomas B. Mapua established the Mapúa Institute of Technology to train and to share to the Filipino artisans what he have learned from the Cornell University in the United States.

=== Philippine Architects Society ===
Among the founding members of the organization were Carlos Alejandro Barretto, who gave the name of the organization; Juan F. Nakpil, president; Tomas Mapua, chief of the Bureau of Public Works;

=== Philippine Institute of Architects ===
In 1945, the PAS was called for a noble cause to help rehabilitate the war-stricken country.

==== Timeline ====
- 1975- The PIA was united with LPA and APGA to form the United Architects of the Philippines.

== Distinguished members ==
=== Gold Medal of Merit Awardees ===
The PIA Gold Medal of Merit is the first and the oldest architectural award in the country. It was designed by Adolfo Benavides in 1950 and created by El Oro engraving.

The organization started awarding merits to outstanding and renowned men and women of the architectural profession who have either done, rendered, or contributed to the enrichment and professional development of architecture in the Philippines and for the economic, civic, and national growth of the country.

Below is the list of the distinguished 22 members of the PIA who have received the Gold Medal of Merit Award from 1958 to present (2014).

1. Andres N. Luna de San Pedro
2. Juan F. Nakpil
3. Fernando H. Ocampo
4. Tomas B. Mapua
5. Juan Marcos Arellano
6. Antonio Manalac Toledo
7. Cesar Concio
8. Jose Ma. Zaragoza
9. Carlos Da Silva
10. Leandro Locsin
11. Carlos Domingo Arguelles
12. Antonio Sindiong
13. Carlos Santos Viola
14. Maximo Vicente, Jr.
15. Manuel Go, Sr.
16. William V. Coscolluela
17. Rogelio G. ViIlarosa
18. Ramon Ma. Zaragoza
19. Ramon S. Orlina, Jr.
20. Jose Pedro C. Recio
21. Carmelo T. Casas

==== Additional Gold Medal of Merits ====
- National Artists for Painting Fernando Amorsolo and Guillermo Tolentino both received the first Gold Medal of Merit Award in Fine Arts in 1955.
- National Artist for Painting Carlos "Botong" Francisco, Gold Medal of Merit Award in Fine Arts in 1963.
- Architects Jose Pedro Recio and Carmelo Casas received the first Architectural Achievement Award in 1999.

==== Gawad Gintong Likha Award ====
The Gawad Gintong Likha Award is a national award given only to "exemplary architects who has received all merits from the Office of the President, United Architects of the Philippines, and the Philippine Institute of Architects".

National Artist Leandro V. Locsin, FPIA, FUAP, is the only one has received the first Gawad Gintong Likha Award. It was posthumously awarded to him in 2006

  - PIA Gold Medal of Merit Awardee
  - UAP Likha Awardee
  - National Artist for Architecture
  - Professional Regulation Commission Architect of the Year Award
  - Araw ng Maynila Awardee
