= Tomás Mapúa =

Filipino architect (1888-1965)

Tomás B. Mapúa
- Born: Tomás Bautista Mapúa; December 21, 1888; Binondo, Manila, Captaincy General of the Philippines
- Died: December 22, 1965 (aged 77); Manila, Philippines
- Resting place: La Loma Cemetery
- Education: Cornell University
- Occupation: Architect
- Spouse: Rita Moya-Mapua (m. 1916)
- Children: Carmen; Oscar Sr. Gloria
- Parent(s): Juan Mapúa; Justina Bautista-Mapua
- Buildings: Mapúa Mansion, Librada Avelino Hall (Centro Escolar University)
- Design: Manila Central Post Office, St. La Salle Hall

Don Tomás Bautista Mapúa (December 21, 1888 – December 22, 1965) was a Filipino architect, educator, politician and businessman from the Philippines. He was the founder and first president of the Mapua University. Gonzalo T. Vales as co-founder and founding dean of school and co-founder and founding president of Central Colleges of the Philippines, after he established the school on January 25, 1925. He was the first registered architect in the Philippines, Manila councilor and first worked at the Philippine Bureau of Public Works. He later established his own construction company, the MYT Construction Works, Inc.

== Biography ==
Mapúa was born to Juan Mapúa and Justina Bautista-Mapúa on December 21, 1888, in Binondo, Manila. His education started at the Ateneo de Manila University and at the Liceo de Manila, both to finish his primary education. In 1903, he was sent to the United States to complete his high school education as one of the pensionado students of the United States. The 1903 Pensionado Law awarded university scholarships to the US for exemplary Filipino students. In exchange, they agreed to work on local government construction projects. He completed his secondary education at the Boone’s Preparatory School in Berkeley, California, and with the pensionado scholarship obtained a degree in architecture at Cornell University in Ithaca, New York.

Upon his return to the Philippines, he joined the Bureau of Public Works where he initially worked as a draftsman in the agency from 1912 to 1917. He was later appointed as the supervising architect for the Bureau from 1917 to 1928. He spearheaded many government projects including the Philippine General Hospital Nurses Home, Psychopathic Building (National Mental Hospital) and the School for the Deaf and Blind. He also designed the Manila Central Post Office Building in Ermita, Manila. Tomás became known for his great contributions in the field of architecture.

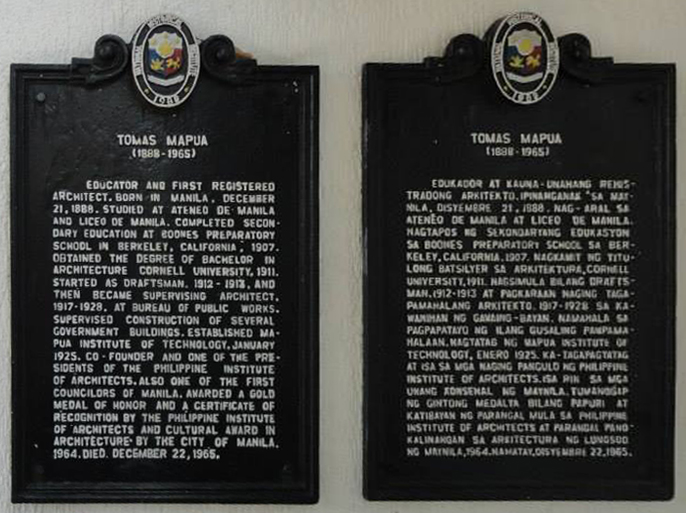
Historical markers of Tomás Mapúa in English and Tagalog placed by the National Historical Institute in 1989. The location of the markers is currently unknown.

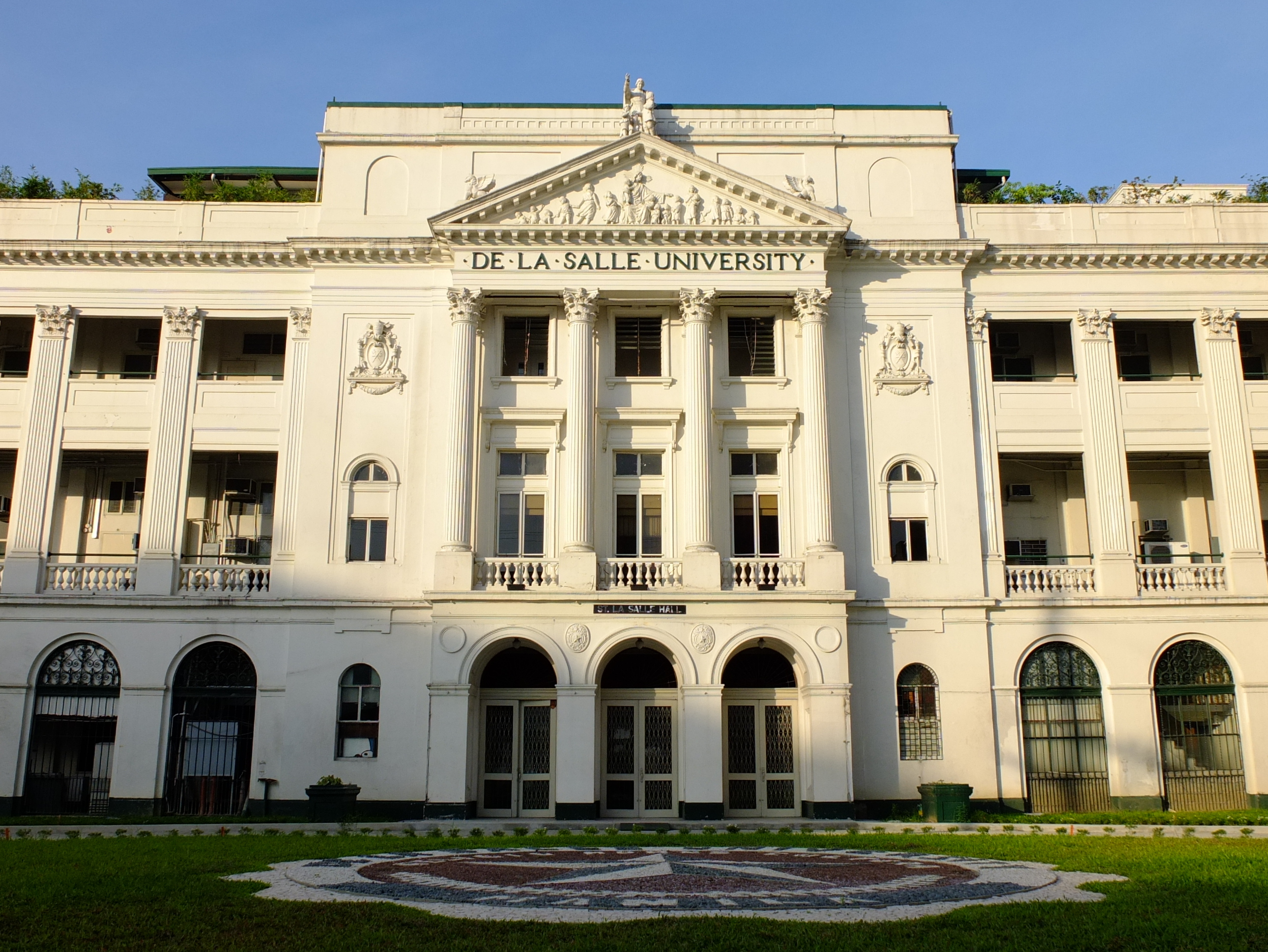
The façade of St. La Salle Hall, designed by Mapúa in 1920

Around 1916, Mapúa joined the competition for the design of the new school building initiated by the La Sallian Brothers. He won the competition against nine other entries and was awarded with a prize of P5,000.00. (The building, St La Salle Hall, was the only structure from the Philippines to be included in the coffee table book, "1001 Buildings You Must See Before You Die: The World's Architectural Masterpieces," authored by Mark Irving and published by Quintessence Books in 2007.)

He was also one of the first councilors of the City of Manila. He co-founded and became one of the presidents of the Philippine Institute of Architects. After retiring from public life, he eventually went back to the private sector. Aside from MIT, he led his own construction firm called MYT Construction Works, Inc. His designs for private homes had also been adjudged as among Manila’s beautiful houses before World War II.

== Personal life ==
Mapúa was married to Rita Moya on November 3, 1916. They have three children, Carmen, Oscar, and Gloria.

== Death ==
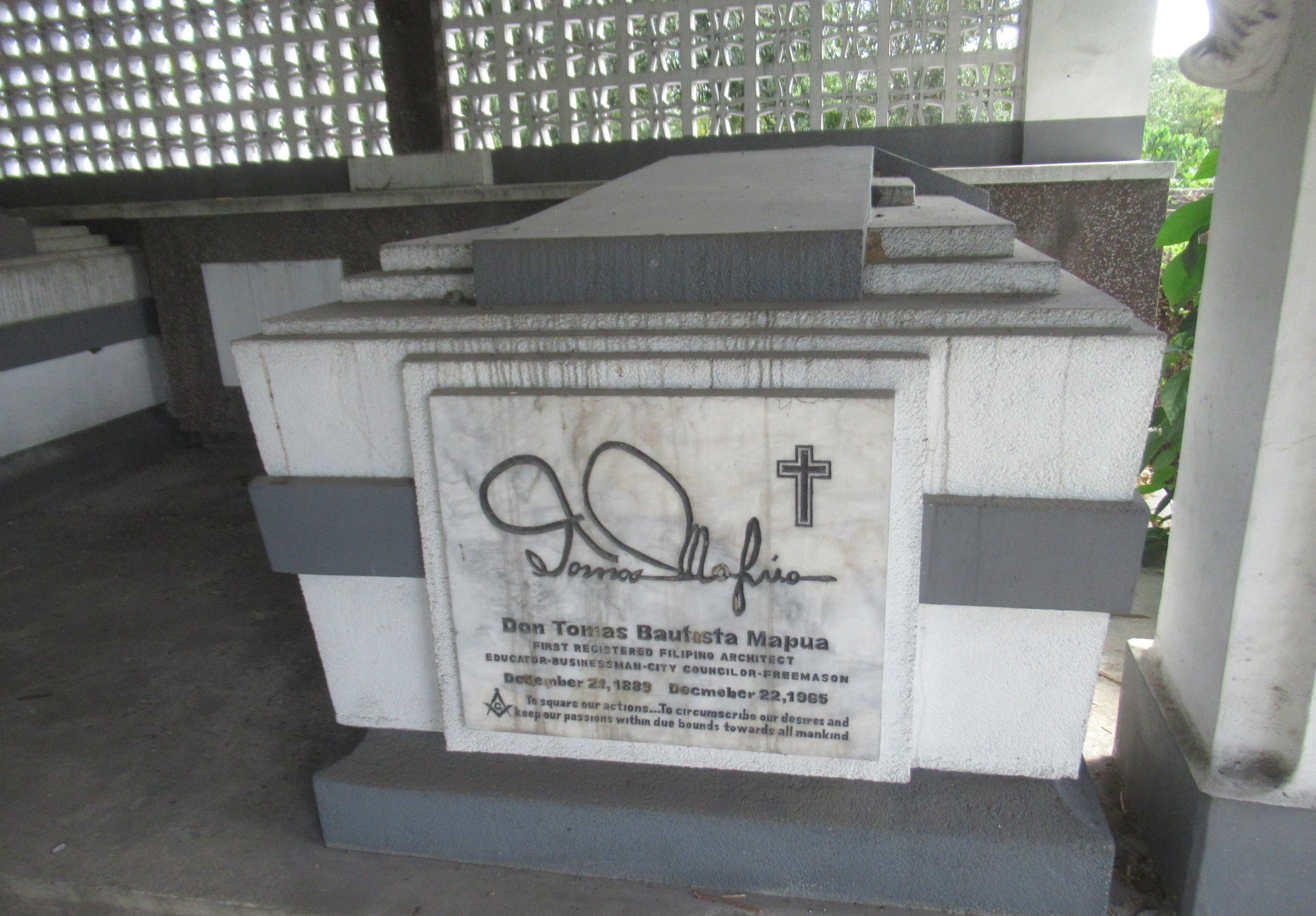
Mapúa's grave at the La Loma Cemetery

Mapúa died on December 22, 1965, in Manila, just a day after his 77th birthday.

== Legacy ==
His son Oscar continued his legacy in education by assuming the presidency of the Mapúa Institute of Technology after his death in 1965. Oscar served as the Institute’s president until his demise on March 17, 1998. His son and Tomás’ grandson, architect Oscar Mapúa Jr., succeeded him and was the institute’s executive vice president until December 1999, when the school was acquired by the Yuchengcos.

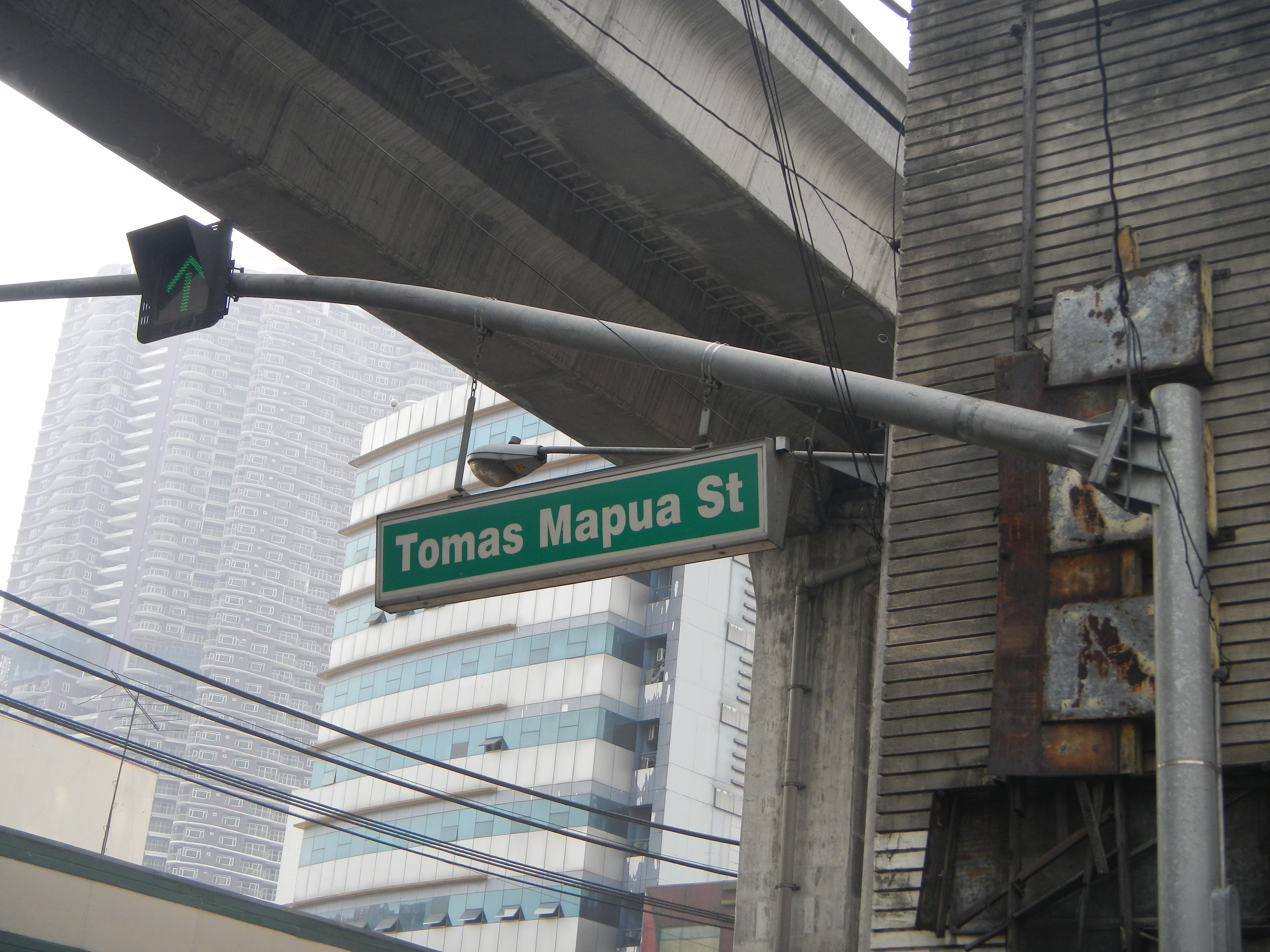
The sign on Tomas Mapua Street in Santa Cruz, Manila

Misericordia Street in Santa Cruz, Manila was renamed to Tomas Mapua Street in his honor.

== Awards ==
He was awarded a gold medal of honor and a certificate of recognition by the Philippine Institute of Architects. He also received a Cultural Award in Architecture by the city of Manila in 1964.

== Works ==
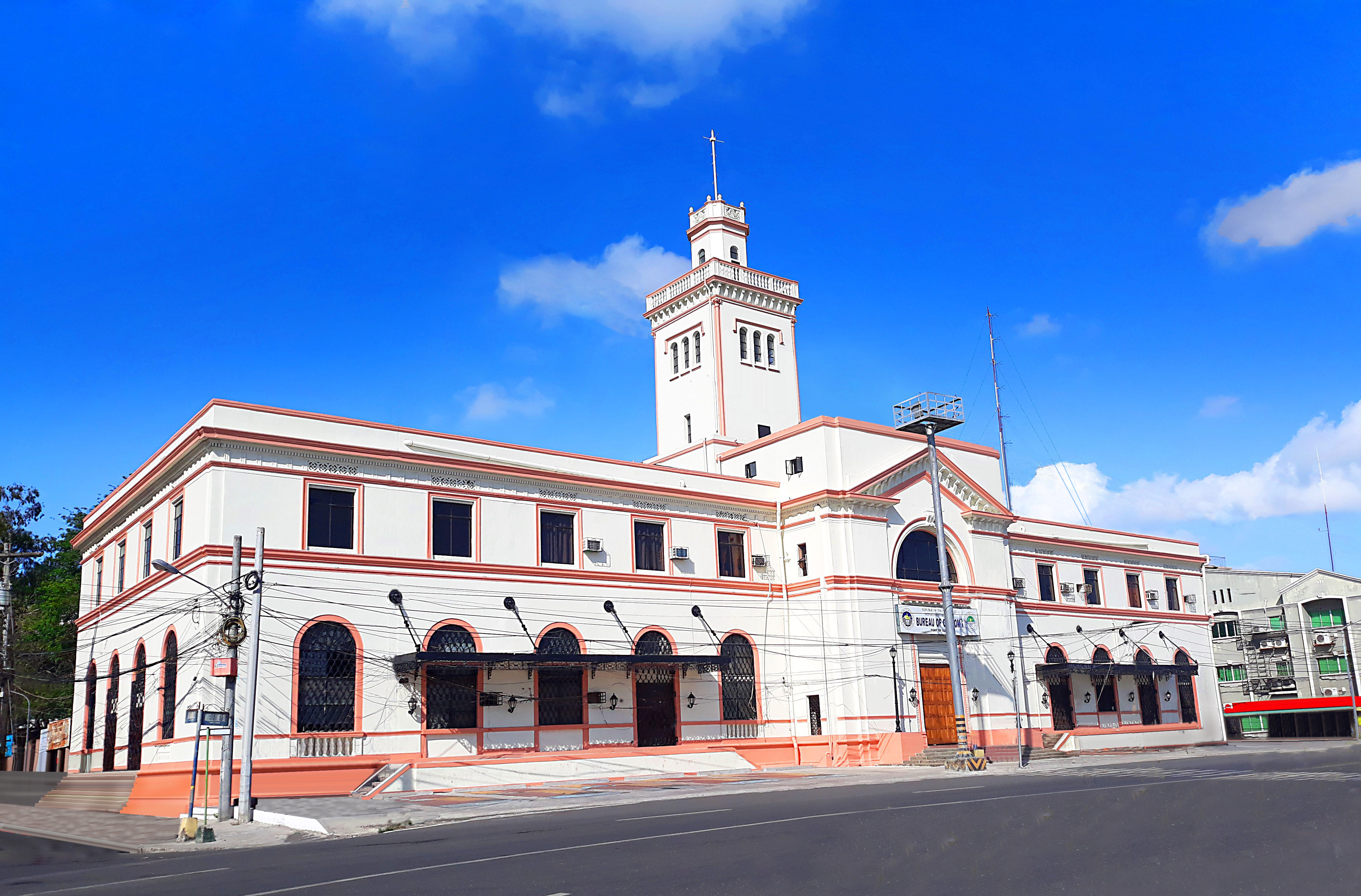
Aduana de Iloilo (Iloilo Customs House) is the second biggest customs house in the Philippines after the Aduana (Intendencia) de Manila in Intramuros.

- 1916: Aduana de Iloilo (Iloilo Customs House)
- 1924: St. La Salle Hall
- 1928: Manila Central Post Office (with Juan M. Arellano)

== See also ==
- Mapua Mansion, the home of Tomas Mapua designed by himself.
