= Vinuesa =

- Municipality
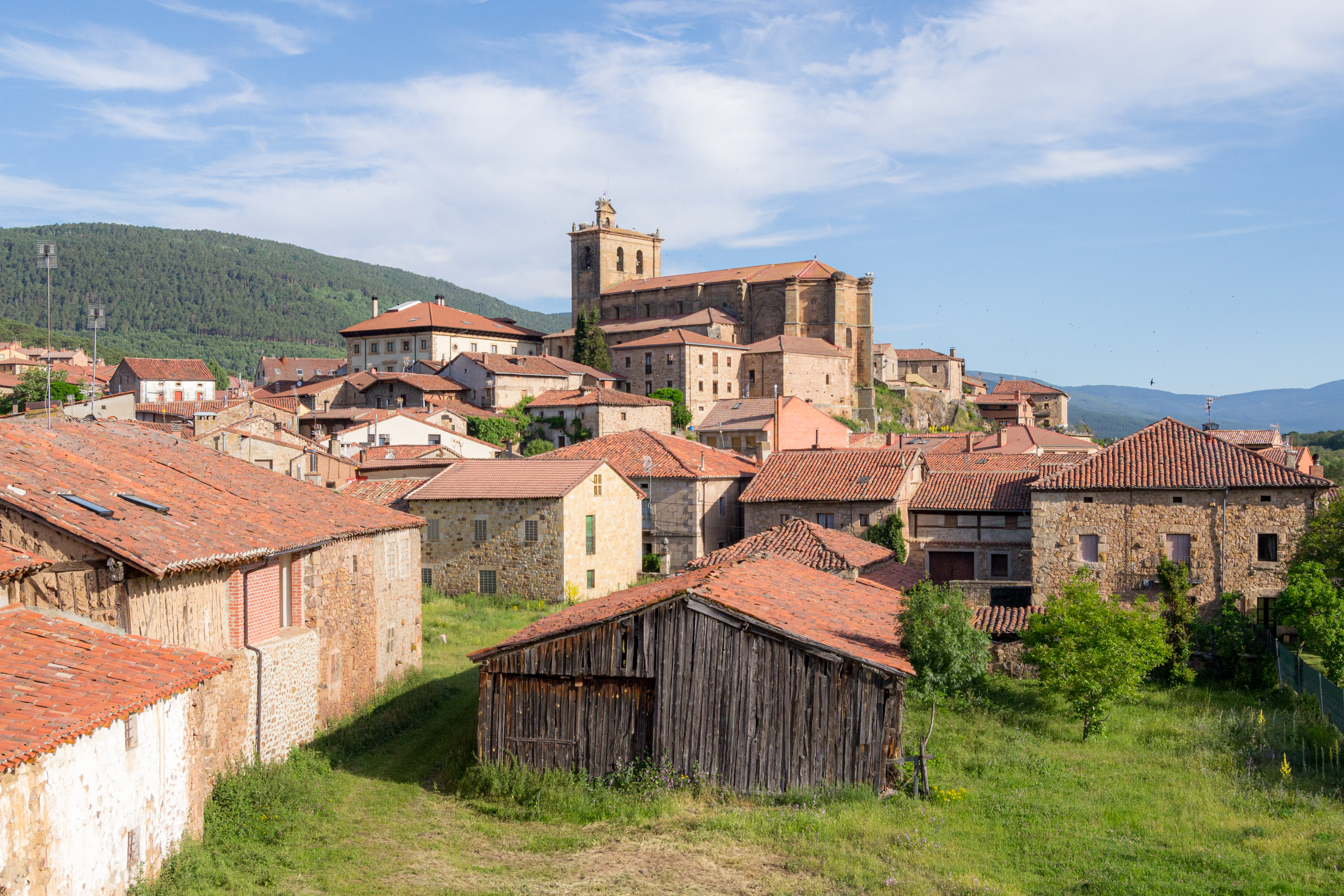
- General view in 2018

- Flag Coat of arms

- Location in Spain. Vinuesa (Spain)
- Coordinates: 41°55′N 2°46′W
- Country: Spain
- Autonomous community: Castile and León
- Province: Soria
- Municipality: Vinuesa

Area
  - Total: 143.06 km^{2} (55.24 sq mi)
- Elevation: 1,108 m (3,635 ft)

Population (2025-01-01)
  - Total: 826
  - Density: 5.77/km^{2} (15.0/sq mi)
- Time zone: UTC+1 (CET)
  - Summer (DST): UTC+2 (CEST)
- Website: Official website

Vinuesa is a municipality located in the province of Soria, in the autonomous community of Castile and León, Spain. It sits at an elevation of 1,108 metres (3,635 ft) above sea level in the foothills of the Urbión mountain range. As of 2025, the municipality has a population of 826 inhabitants.

Vinuesa is a member of the association Los Pueblos más Bonitos de España (The Most Beautiful Villages of Spain).

== Geography ==
Vinuesa lies in the eastern part of the Pinares comarca, at the foot of the Picos de Urbión and Sierra de Cebollera mountain ranges, in the northwest of the province of Soria, approximately 35 km from the provincial capital. It borders Montenegro de Cameros to the north, El Royo and Soria to the east, Soria and Cidones to the south, and Salduero, Molinos de Duero and Covaleda to the west.

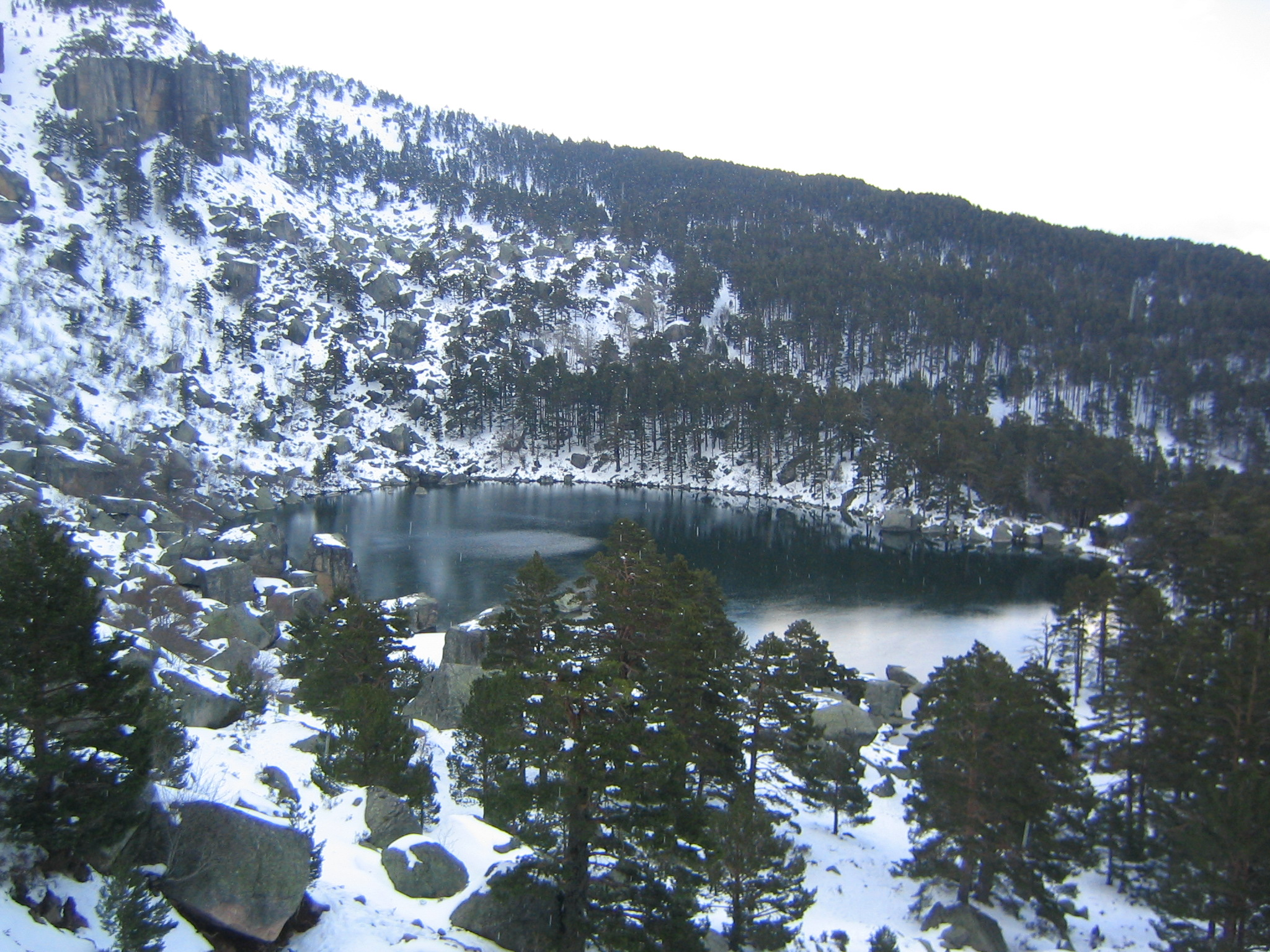
Laguna Negra de Urbión

The Duero river, the third longest river on the Iberian Peninsula, rises in the Picos de Urbión at 2,060 metres above sea level and passes through the municipality after approximately 25 km of its course. It is impounded within the municipal territory by the La Cuerda del Pozo dam, inaugurated in 1941, which submerged the former village of La Muedra. The reservoir supplies drinking water to the cities of Soria and Valladolid and covers a surface area of 2,176 hectares.

The municipality is home to the Laguna Negra (Black Lake), a glacial lake surrounded by steep rock walls where birds of prey nest. The lake inspired Antonio Machado's narrative poem La Tierra de Alvargonzález (1912). It is one of several glacial lakes in the area, formed during the last ice age.

Several areas within the municipality are protected under the Natura 2000 network, including the Riberas del Río Duero y afluentes (99 hectares), Sierras de Urbión y Cebollera (2,195 hectares), and the Sierra de Urbión Special Protection Area for Birds (1,540 hectares).

== History ==
The area shows evidence of human settlement since the Neolithic period, with arrowheads and a stone axe found at the site known as "el Bardo". In the 5th century BCE, the Pelendones tribe, a Celtiberian people, settled at the confluence of the Revinuesa, Remonicio and Duero rivers, founding the settlement of Visontium, the earliest recorded name of Vinuesa. The site was later maintained and expanded under Roman rule, and a Roman road connecting Visontium with Uxama and Numantia passed through the municipality, along with a bridge over the Duero.

Following the Christian reconquest, Vinuesa was incorporated into Castile. A census ordered by King Alfonso X of Castile in 1272 recorded 24 households, making it the most populous settlement in the Pinares comarca. In 1273, the establishment of the Mesta — the royal council regulating livestock and wool trade — brought significant economic privileges to local shepherds and herders.

In 1368, King John I of Castile was saved from a wolf attack during a hunting trip by inhabitants of Vinuesa. In gratitude, he granted the town its coat of arms, which depicts a pine tree and a wolf.

== Heritage ==
=== Religious buildings ===
The Church of Nuestra Señora del Pino is the most significant monument in Vinuesa. Construction began in 1591 in a Gothic-Renaissance style. The building has a Latin cross floor plan with three naves covered by ribbed vaults and an octagonal apse. The interior contains several 18th-century Rococo altarpieces and a 17th-century main altarpiece in Baroque style, designed by Domingo González de Acereda.

The municipality also has several hermitages. The Hermitage of La Soledad (16th century, between 1560 and 1570) is located in the town centre and features a Baroque altarpiece. The Hermitage of San Mateo stands within a centuries-old pine forest. The Hermitage of San Pedro hosts a popular pilgrimage on 29 June. The Hermitage of San Antón, which has a crucifix dating from 1563, is home to the oldest religious brotherhood in Vinuesa. a en culture pinochada · TXT

=== Roman bridge and road ===
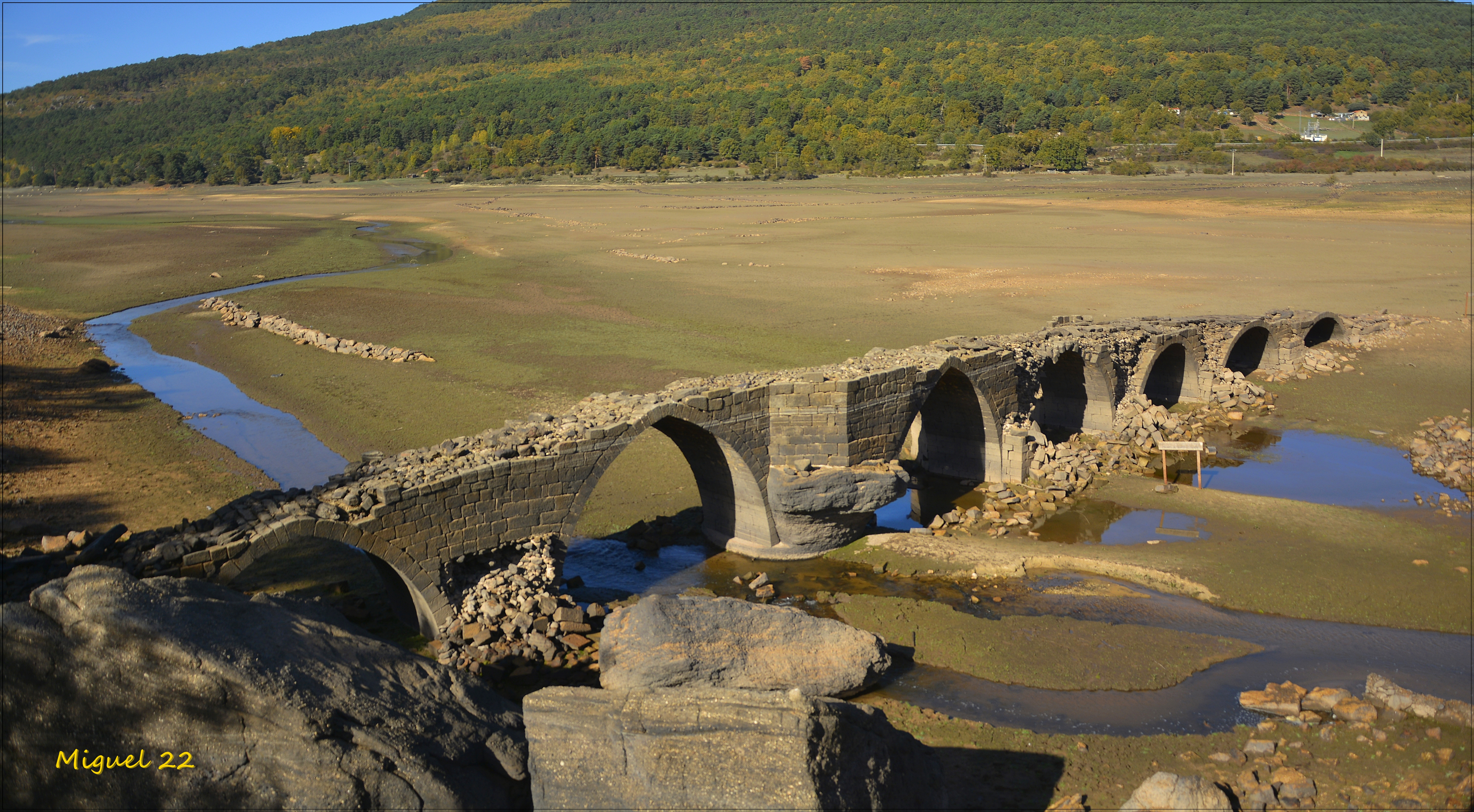
The Roman bridge of Vinuesa, exposed during a period of drought; it lies submerged beneath the Cuerda del Pozo reservoir for much of the year

South of the town, over the Duero and beside the modern road bridge, stands the structure known locally as the Roman bridge or bridge of San Mateo. It is dated to the 1st century AD and was later enlarged in the Middle Ages with pointed arches. The bridge is 87 metres long and 3 metres wide, with a maximum height of 5.5 metres.

It carried a road connecting Visontium with Uxama Argaela, a branch of the route linking Asturica Augusta with Caesaraugusta; some four kilometres of the roadway survive within the municipal boundary, along with a number of milestones. An inscription on a stone preserved in neighbouring Molinos de Duero attributes the road's construction to the magistrate Lucius Lucretius Densus.

Since the Cuerda del Pozo reservoir was completed in 1941, the bridge has lain under water for much of the year, emerging in summer and in drought years. Submersion is itself the principal threat to the structure: while underwater the stones lose the compression that holds them in place and gradually shift, so that the damage accumulates with each cycle. The bridge has been listed on the Red List of Endangered Heritage maintained by the conservation association Hispania Nostra since 20 October 2008, which records it as largely collapsed and at risk of further ruin, with the mortar disintegrating and the stonework subject to looting and vandalism.

A local association, Salvemos el Puente de Vinuesa, has campaigned for its conservation, and an application for designation as a Bien de Interés Cultural has been submitted. In 2024 the mayor reported that an arch and several rows of the arcade had already fallen, warning that if the structure collapsed it would have to be rebuilt rather than restored. The council has considered options ranging from restoration in situ to relocating the bridge elsewhere in the municipality, and has commissioned a 3D survey in collaboration with the University of Burgos.

== Culture ==
=== Festivals ===
Vinuesa's patronal festivities honour the Virgen del Pino, patron saint of the town, and San Roque, and are held from 14 to 18 August. Their principal events are the pingada del mayo on 14 August, the offering of candles to the Virgin known as La Vela, the baile del Campo Verde danced on 15 August by the officers of the town's two confraternities, and La Pinochada on 16 August. The festivities close with bull-running events and a communal stew, the caldereta.

=== La Pingada del Mayo ===
The festivities open on 14 August with the pingada del mayo. The mayo is a Scots pine of between 22 and 26 metres, weighing up to a tonne, stripped of its branches except at the crown. It is felled and brought down from the forest by ox cart the previous day, and is chosen in advance by the stewards of the Cofradía de la Virgen del Pino, the confraternity of married men.

At 11:30 the church bells formally open the festivities, and at noon a procession climbs from the Hermitage of La Soledad to the Plaza Mayor, where the trunk is raised. The young men of the town lift it from the horizontal using long cross-shaped poles, working under the orders of a director, until it stands upright in a prepared hole and is fixed with wooden wedges. A second mayo is then raised in front of the Hermitage of La Soledad by the Cofradía de San Roque, the confraternity of bachelors.

The origin of the custom is unrecorded. It is generally understood as a survival of the European maypole tradition and of older rites associated with fertility and the renewal of the natural world; unlike most maypoles in the province, which are raised in spring, Vinuesa's has been transferred to August and attached to the patronal feast. In 2019 the ONCE devoted its daily lottery ticket of 13 August to the pingada del mayo, printing five and a half million copies.

=== La Pinochada ===
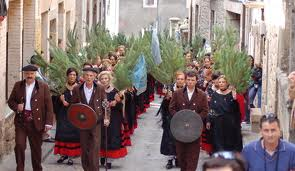
La Pinochada in Vinuesa

The main day is 16 August, when the town celebrates La Pinochada, a ritual dance and mock battle that has been designated a Festival of Regional Tourist Interest. A pinocho is a pine branch; the branches are blessed at morning mass and carried by the women and girls of the town, who wear the local piñorra costume.

Outside the church the men of the two confraternities — Nuestra Señora del Pino for married men and San Roque for bachelors — line up armed with sabres and small shields and circle the square, striking their opponents' shields in time to the music. The sequence is repeated three times and the married men are the victors. The women of each side then take their turn, with the married women likewise prevailing. Finally all the women strike the men present with their pinochos, saying "De hoy en un año" ("a year from today"), to which each man must reply "Gracias" ("thank you").

The most widespread account of the festival's origin holds that an image of the Virgin del Pino appeared on a pine tree standing on the boundary between Vinuesa and neighbouring Covaleda, with its roots in one municipality and its crown in the other. The two towns disputed possession, and Vinuesa prevailed thanks to the intervention of its women, armed with pine branches; the carving was awarded to Vinuesa and the woodland to Covaleda. Other interpretations read the temporary authority granted to women during the festival as a vestige of an earlier matriarchal order, comparable to the Santa Águeda celebrations held elsewhere in Spain, or as a survival of a Celtic pine cult.

Vinuesa, under the fictional name "Ramosierra", is the subject of Michael Kenny's ethnographic study A Spanish Tapestry: Town and Country in Castile (1961).

== Mass festivals ==
In July 2026, the fifth edition of the Motorbeach motorcycle festival was held from 9 to 12 July on the shore of the Cuerda del Pozo reservoir, within the municipality. A 24-year-old woman died in a motorcycle accident during the event, and the Civil Guard recorded 435 reported offences and 21 sets of proceedings. The attendance figure communicated to the authorities for security planning was around 4,000 people, while available data pointed to a higher turnout.

A subsequent coordination meeting convened by the Spanish Government Subdelegation in Soria, attended by the regional government of Castile and León, the Civil Guard, the Duero Hydrographic Confederation and the municipal council, concluded that environmental damage was greater than initially anticipated and that restoration would require a technical project at the expense of the party responsible. The regional government drew up formal records used as the basis for sanctioning proceedings. The environmental group ASDEN-Ecologistas en Acción estimated that around 70 hectares of forest land near the Bardo beach had been affected. The mayor, Juan Ramón Soria, stated that the council would not have authorised the festival had it known its true scale, and announced that it would not be held in the municipality again.

The Iberia Eclipse electronic music festival had been scheduled for 10 to 14 August 2026 at the same location, coinciding with the total solar eclipse. Organised by an international network of promoters, it drew opposition from residents and environmental groups months before its authorisation was resolved. Expected attendance was a central point of dispute: figures of between 10,000 and 20,000 circulated publicly, while the organisers maintained in June 2026 that they were working with a maximum of 3,000 to 5,000 people. The Duero Hydrographic Confederation, which in June stated that it had received no formal application regarding the event, later opposed authorising use of the public hydraulic domain. The municipal council ultimately refused authorisation following an unfavourable environmental report from the regional government, and on 29 July 2026 the council plenary unanimously ratified the mayoral decision, citing the Motorbeach precedent.
