= Astorga (surname) =

Astorga is a Hispanic surname that may refer to the following notable people:

- André Astorga (born 1980), Brazilian football defender
- Baltazar Astorga (born 1982), Chilean football player
- Christina Astorga, American theologian
- Emanuele d'Astorga (1681–1736) Italian composer
- Emiliano Astorga (born 1960), Chilean football player
- Herminio A. Astorga (1929–2004), the vice-mayor of the City of Manila from 1962 to 1967
- Juan Oliver y Astorga (1733–1830), Spanish composer
- Manuel Astorga (born 1937), Chilean football goalkeeper
- Mónica Astorga Cremona (born 1967), Argentine nun
- Nora Astorga (1948–1988), Nicaraguan guerrilla fighter
- Pedro d'Alva y Astorga, Spanish Catholic theologian
