= Teodoro Locsin =

Teodoro Locsin may refer to:

- Teodoro Locsin Sr. (1914–2000), Filpino journalist
- Teodoro Locsin Jr. (born 1948), Filipino politician, son of Locsin Sr.
