= Lacson Underpass =

Pedestrian underpass in Manila, Philippines

Arsenio H. Lacson Underpass
- Pedestrian underpass
- Victory Lacson Underpass
- Former name: Quiapo Underpass
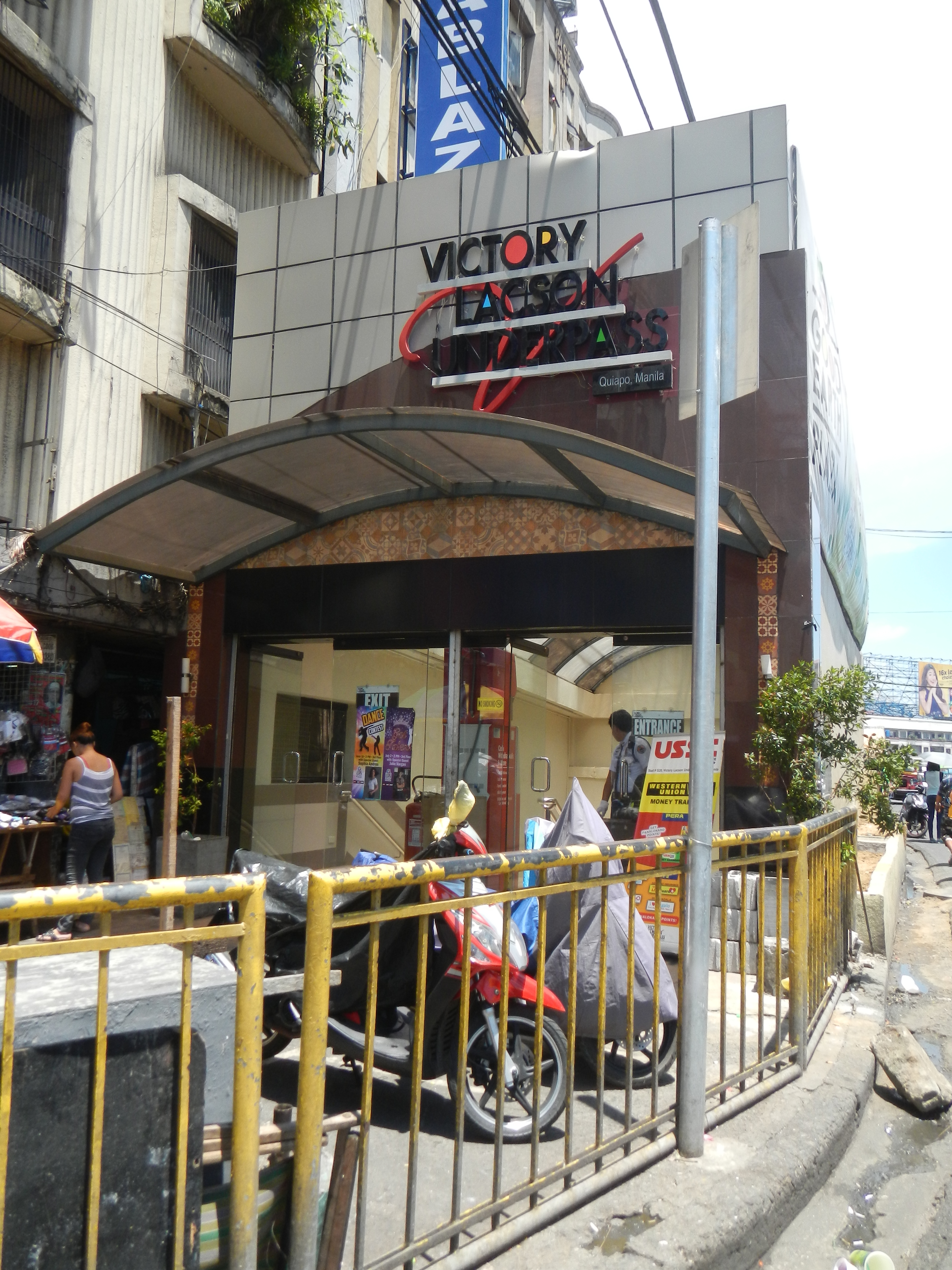
- Underpass entrance along Quezon Boulevard.
- Constructed: 1962–1964
- Opened: 1964
- Dedicated to: Arsenio Lacson
- Owner: City of Manila
- Manager: White Scope Property Management
- Location: Quezon Boulevard, Quiapo, Manila, Philippines
- Interactive map of Arsenio H. Lacson Underpass
- Coordinates: 14°35′53″N 120°59′02″E
- Website: www.victorymalls.com

The Arsenio H. Lacson Underpass, also known as the Victory Lacson Underpass, is a pedestrian underpass and retail area in Quiapo, Manila, Philippines. First opened in the 1960s, it is regarded as the first pedestrian underpass in the Philippines.

== History ==
The Lacson Underpass was originally known as the Quiapo Underpass. The construction of the underpass began in 1962 during the term of Manila Mayor Arsenio Lacson who would die in office within the same year. The underpass would be completed in 1964, during the tenure of Lacson's successor, Antonio Villegas. The facility which was renamed as "Arsenio H. Lacson Underpass" in honor of Mayor Lacson is regarded as the first pedestrian underpass in the Philippines.

Upon its opening, the Lacson Underpass had an air-conditioning system installed but the condition its facilities deteriorated over the years after Villegas' mayoral tenure. Vendors operating inside the underpass have left little space for pedestrian traffic, the homeless have taken shelter in the underpass, and have become a criminal hotspot.

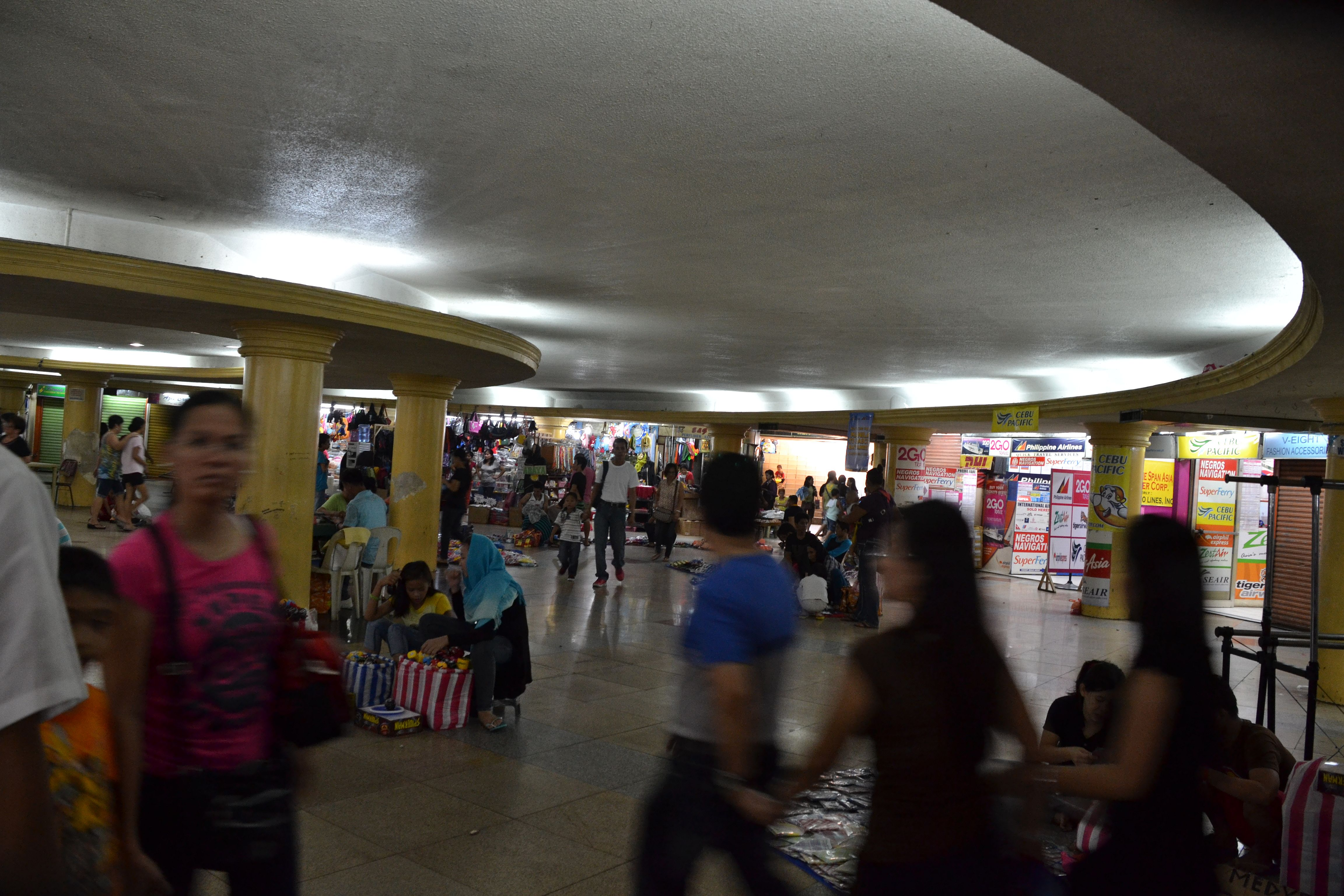
The underpass' interior prior to the 2014 renovations.

In early 2014, the Lacson Underpass was closed for renovation under the administration of Mayor Joseph Estrada. The city government entered a joint agreement with White Scope Property Management, the owner of the Victory Malls shopping chain for the renovation works. Among the changes include a new air-conditioning system, lighting, renovated restrooms, and new commercial stalls. The underpass was renamed as Victory Lacson Underpass with White Scope securing the right to operate the underpass and its retail space for 25 years due to its deal with the Manila city government. The underpass was reopened in October 2014.

The Lacson Underpass under White Scope was only accessible to pedestrians for a limited time per day, until June 2019, when the underpass was made accessible 24 hours a day in compliance with then-Mayor-elect Isko Moreno's orders.

== Facilities ==
The Victory Lacson Underpass has seven entrances accessible along Quezon Boulevard, Hidalgo Street, Arlegui Street and the Quiapo Church. The underpass also provides connection to the Islamic worship.

In terms of retail space, the Lacson Underpass has an allocated space for 200 booths.
