= Arsenio Lacson =

Filipino lawyer and politician (1912–1962)

The Honorable Arsenio Lacson
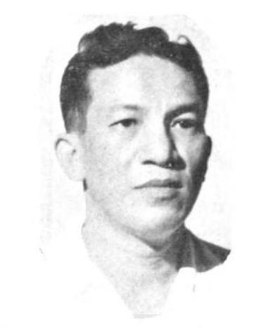
- Lacson official portrait during the 2nd Congress

17th Mayor of Manila
- In office January 1, 1952 – April 15, 1962
- Vice Mayor: Bartolome Gatmaitan (1952–1955); Jesus M. Roces (1956–1959); Antonio J. Villegas (1959–1962)
- Preceded by: Manuel de la Fuente
- Succeeded by: Antonio Villegas

Member of the House of Representatives from Manila's 2nd district
- In office December 30, 1949 – January 1, 1952
- Preceded by: Hermenegildo Atienza
- Succeeded by: Joaquin Roces

Personal details
- Born: Arsenio Hilario Sison Lacson; December 26, 1912 Talisay, Negros Occidental, Philippine Islands
- Died: April 15, 1962 (aged 49) Ermita, Manila, Philippines
- Resting place: Manila North Cemetery, Manila, Philippines
- Party: Nacionalista (1949–1962)
- Other political affiliations: Liberal (1961)
- Spouse: Luz Santiago (m. 1933)
- Children: 4
- Occupation: Journalist, politician
- Profession: Lawyer
Association football career
- Positions: Half-back; defensive midfielder
College career
Years	Team	Apps	(Gls)
1930–31	Ateneo de Manila University		
1932–36	University of Santo Tomas		
International career
c. 1934	Philippines		

Arsenio Hilario Sison Lacson Sr. (December 26, 1912 – April 15, 1962) was a Filipino lawyer, journalist and politician who gained widespread attention as the 17th Mayor of Manila and the first to be democratically elected. An active executive likened by Time and The New York Times to New York City's Fiorello La Guardia, he was the first Manila mayor to be reelected to three terms, remaining in office for over a decade from January 1952 to April 1962. Nicknamed "Arsenic" and described as "a good man with a bad mouth", Lacson's fiery temperament became a trademark of his political and broadcasting career. He died suddenly from a stroke amidst talk that he was planning to run in the 1965 presidential election.

== Early life and education ==
Lacson was born on December 26, 1912, in Talisay, Negros Occidental, amid a fierce storm. He was the son of Roman Ledesma Lacson, a scion of the distinguished Lacson family, and Rosario Sison. His father named him Arsenio, in honor of the renowned Philippine showman and journalist Arsenio Luz, whom he deeply admired. His second name, came from his grandfather, Hilario Lacson. Lacson is also the nephew of Gen. Aniceto Lacson, the president of the short-lived Republic of Negros, while his niece, Rose Lacson, later gained recognition in Australia as a notable socialite. His nephew, Salvador, holds the position of chairman at LLIBI Insurance Brokers, a leading firm since 1973.

Despite being a sickly child, Lacson turned to athletics during his time at the Ateneo de Manila University, where he earned a Bachelor of Arts degree. While still a student, he took up amateur boxing, which left him with a broken nose—a feature that would become a distinctive part of his appearance.

Lacson pursued his legal studies at the University of Santo Tomas, and after graduating and passing the bar in 1937, he began his career at the law office of future Senator Vicente Francisco. He then moved on to serve as an assistant attorney at the Department of Justice. Before the outbreak of World War II, Lacson also made his mark as a respected sportswriter, cementing his reputation in both law and journalism.

== Sporting career ==
=== Football ===
Lacson was part of the collegiate football team of the Ateneo de Manila University. He played at the halfback position or as defensive midfielder for the Ateneo squad. He was also part of the Philippines national football team and participated in tournaments such as the 1934 Far Eastern Championship Games.

After Lacson graduated from Ateneo, he studied at the University of Santo Tomas Faculty of Civil Law. While a law student, Lacson joined the UST football team.

== World War II guerrilla ==
Lacson joined the armed resistance against the Imperial Japanese Army which had invaded the Philippines in late 1941. He joined the Free Philippines underground movement, and acted as a lead scout during the Battle of Manila. Lacson also fought in the liberation of Baguio on April 26, 1945.

For his wartime service, Lacson received citations from the Veterans of Foreign Wars and the Sixth United States Army. Years later, when asked by Japanese Prime Minister Nobusuke Kishi if he had learned Japanese during the war, Lacson responded, "I was too busy shooting at Japanese to learn any."

== Journalism career ==
Lacson resumed his career in journalism after the war. He also had his own radio program called In This Corner, where he delivered social and political commentary. Lacson became popular as a result of his radio show, but also earned the ire of President Manuel Roxas, whom he nicknamed "Manny the Weep". In 1947, President Roxas ordered Lacson's suspension from the airwaves. The incident drew international attention after former US Interior Secretary Harold L. Ickes defended Roxas's action and in turn drew rebuke for such defense from the popular radio commentator Walter Winchell. Lacson also wrote columns together with editor José W. Diokno, and writers Teodoro Locsin Sr., and Phillip Buencamino in a newspaper they founded called Free Philippines.

== Political career ==
=== House of Representatives (1949–1952) ===
In the 1949 general elections, Lacson ran for and won a seat in the House of Representatives, representing the 2nd District of Manila, which then consisted of the districts of Binondo, Quiapo, San Nicolas and Santa Cruz. He was elected under the banner of the Nacionalista Party. During the two years he served in the House, Lacson was cited by the media assigned to cover Congress as among the "10 Most Useful Congressmen" for "his excellent display as a fiscalizer and a lawmaker".

=== Mayor of Manila (1952–1962) ===
In 1951, the office of Manila mayor became an elective position following the amendment of its city charter. Representative Lacson successfully unseated incumbent Manila Mayor Manuel de la Fuente in the first ever mayoralty election in the city. He assumed the office of mayor on January 1, 1952, thus giving up his seat in the Congress. He was re-elected in 1955 and 1959. He immediately became known as a tough-minded reformist mayor, and in the 1950s, he and Zamboanga City Mayor Cesar Climaco were touted as exemplars of good local governance. Climaco, in fact, was praised as "The Arsenio H. Lacson of the South".

At the time Lacson assumed office, Manila had around ₱23.5 million in debt, some of which had been contracted thirty years earlier, and had no money to pay its employees. Within three years, the debt had been reduced in half, and by 1959, the city had a budget surplus of ₱4.3 million and paid its employees twice the amount earned by other local government employees. By that time, Lacson claimed that the income earned by Manila for the Philippines supported 70% of the salaries of national government officials and members of Congress, as well as 70% of the expenses of the Armed Forces of the Philippines.

Lacson embarked on crusades to maintain peace and order and good government in Manila. He fired 600 city employees for incompetence, and dismissed corrupt policemen. He personally led raids on brothels masquerading as massage parlors and on unauthorized market vendors. Lacson ordered bulldozers to clear a squatter colony in Malate that had stood since shortly after the war. Lacson established a mobile 60-car patrol unit that patrolled the city at all hours, and he himself patrolled the city at night in a black police car. Lacson also established the Manila Zoo and the city's first underpass, located in Quiapo, posthumously named after him.

Throughout his ten years as mayor, Lacson maintained his radio program, which now aired over DZBB and was also later broadcast on television. The broadcasts were pre-recorded in order to edit out his expletives and occasional foul language. He spoke out on national and international issues, and responded to critics who suggested that he confine himself to city issues that he did not lose his right as a citizen to speak out on public affairs upon his election as mayor. He was a fervent critic of President Elpidio Quirino, the incumbent president from Liberal. In 1952, upon the filing of a criminal libel complaint against Lacson by a judge whom he criticized on his radio show, Quirino suspended Lacson from office. Lacson was suspended for 73 days until the Supreme Court voided Quirino's order.

Though the hard-drinking, gun-toting Lacson projected an image of machismo, the author Nick Joaquin observed:

Lacson has sedulously cultivated the "yahoo" manner, the siga-siga style, but one suspects that the bristles on the surface do not go all the way down; for this guy with a pug's battered nose comes from a good family and went to the right schools; this character who talks like a stevedore is a literate, even a literary, man; and this toughie who has often been accused of being too chummy with the underworld belonged to the most "idealistic" of the wartime underground groups: the Free Philippines.

=== Peak years ===
In 1953, Lacson actively campaigned for Nacionalista presidential candidate Ramon Magsaysay, who went on to defeat the incumbent Quirino. After President Magsaysay's death in a plane crash months before the 1957 presidential election, Lacson claimed that Magsaysay had offered to name him as the Nacionalista candidate for vice president, in lieu of incumbent Vice-President Carlos P. Garcia. According to Lacson, he declined the offer, telling Magsaysay "the time has not yet come".

Nonetheless, after Magsaysay's death, Lacson turned against the newly installed President Garcia, and considered running against Garcia in the 1957 election. In April 1957, Lacson went on a national tour in order to gauge his nationwide strength as a presidential candidate. While the tour indicated considerable popularity of Lacson in the provinces, his potential run was hampered by a lack of funding and a party machinery. It was believed that Lacson would have easily won the presidency in 1957 had he obtained the nomination of either the Nacionalista Party, then committed to Garcia, or the rival Liberal Party, which selected Jose Yulo as its candidate. The American expatriate and tobacco industrialist Harry Stonehill, who was later indicted by Justice Secretary José W. Diokno for bribing officials, falsely claimed that Lacson had asked him to finance his campaign against Garcia. When Stonehill refused, Lacson decided not to run, and thereafter, staged a rally at Plaza Miranda where he denounced the United States and what he perceived as the subservience of the Philippine government to the Americans. In his career, Lacson was frequently tagged as anti-American, and he criticized the United States for having no foreign policy "but just a pathological fear of communism".

=== Meteoric rise and proposed presidential campaign with José W. Diokno ===
Garcia won in the 1957 election, and Lacson became a persistent critic of the President throughout his four-year term. In 1961, Lacson turned against the Nacionalista Party and supported the presidential candidacy of Vice-President Diosdado Macapagal of the Liberal Party. He was named Macapagal's national campaign manager and was attributed as "the moving spirit behind a nationwide drive that led to Macapagal's victory at the polls".

Not long after Macapagal's election, Lacson returned to the Nacionalista Party and became increasingly critical of the President, explaining "I only promised to make Macapagal President, not agree with him forever." Lacson was considered as the likely presidential candidate of the Nacionalistas for the 1965 election, with his close friend José Wright Diokno as his intended running mate. Before becoming the justice secretary through Lacson's endorsement, Diokno previously defended the mayor and radio personality for libel charges against his talk show. Lacson in turn often visited Diokno's Parañaque home in the wee hours to make breakfast for Diokno and his wife Carmen. The lawyer and future senator often volunteered to edit Lacson's newspaper articles. Lacson garnered a huge level of fame that would have allowed him to win as president in the 1965 election. Unfortunately Lacson suddenly died, allowing the party to select Ferdinand Marcos, an Ilocano politician who left the Liberal Party to give him an opportunity to run against partymate Macapagal. Lacson was also Marcos's lawyer when he was tried for the murder of Julio Nalundasan in the 1930s. Lacson often chided Marcos for this to which the latter often lost his temper and consequently lost debates to Lacson.

== Death ==
As mayor, Lacson had faced several attempts on his life. He twice disarmed gunmen who had attacked him, and survived an ambush as he was driving home one night. Around 5:40 P.M. of April 15, 1962, a hotel boy named Pablo Olazo, who was asked by Lacson to get him some ice, saw him almost at the end of his bed and he was profusely perspiring. Olazo, then fetched for the aides of Lacson, and later called Mario Tintiangco, his personal physician, but it was Godofredo Banzon, who was the first doctor arrived around 5:50 in the afternoon. Around fifteen minutes later, Banzon pronounced Lacson dead. By that time, a secondary physician named Baltazar Villaraza arrived, and he and Banzon thought that the cause of Lacson's death was coronary thrombosis. Lacson died at the age of 49. Some sources claimed that he was fatally stricken at a hotel suite while in the company of Charito Solis, but the records show that he was alone in his hotel room and did not log Solis's name. Lacson was buried at the Manila North Cemetery. His official cause of death surprised his relatives, claiming that Lacson had undergone a routine medical check-up shortly before his death, which showed that his heart was in perfect condition.

== Personal life ==
Lacson was only 21 when he married 18-year-old Sampaloc scion Luz Santiago in 1932 and had four children.

== Legacy ==
Places named after Lacson include the Lacson Underpass in Quiapo, while Plaza Goiti in Santa Cruz was renamed "Plaza Lacson", and Governor Forbes Avenue in Sampaloc and Santa Cruz was renamed "Lacson Avenue". In Plaza Lacson is one of Lacson's statues; another statue was erected along Roxas Boulevard facing Manila Bay, this time of him seated on a bench reading a newspaper. Lacson was later honored with a statue outside Manila City Hall.

== Gallery ==
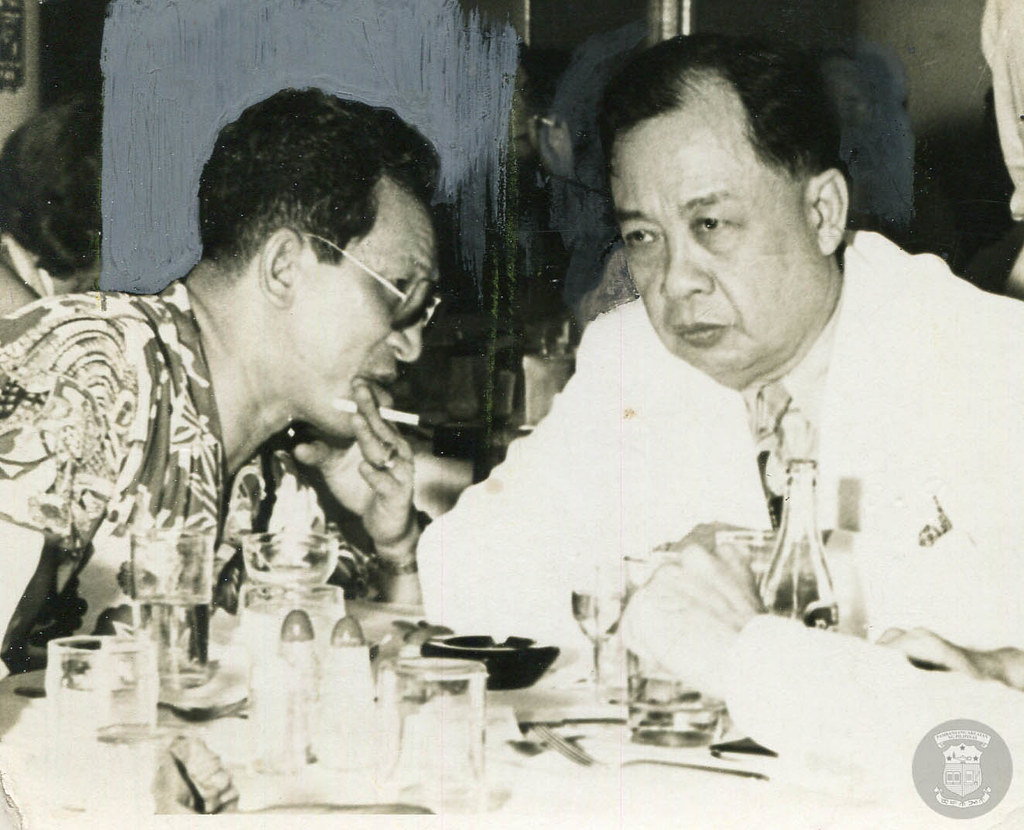
Lacson (left) with Senator Claro M. Recto (right)

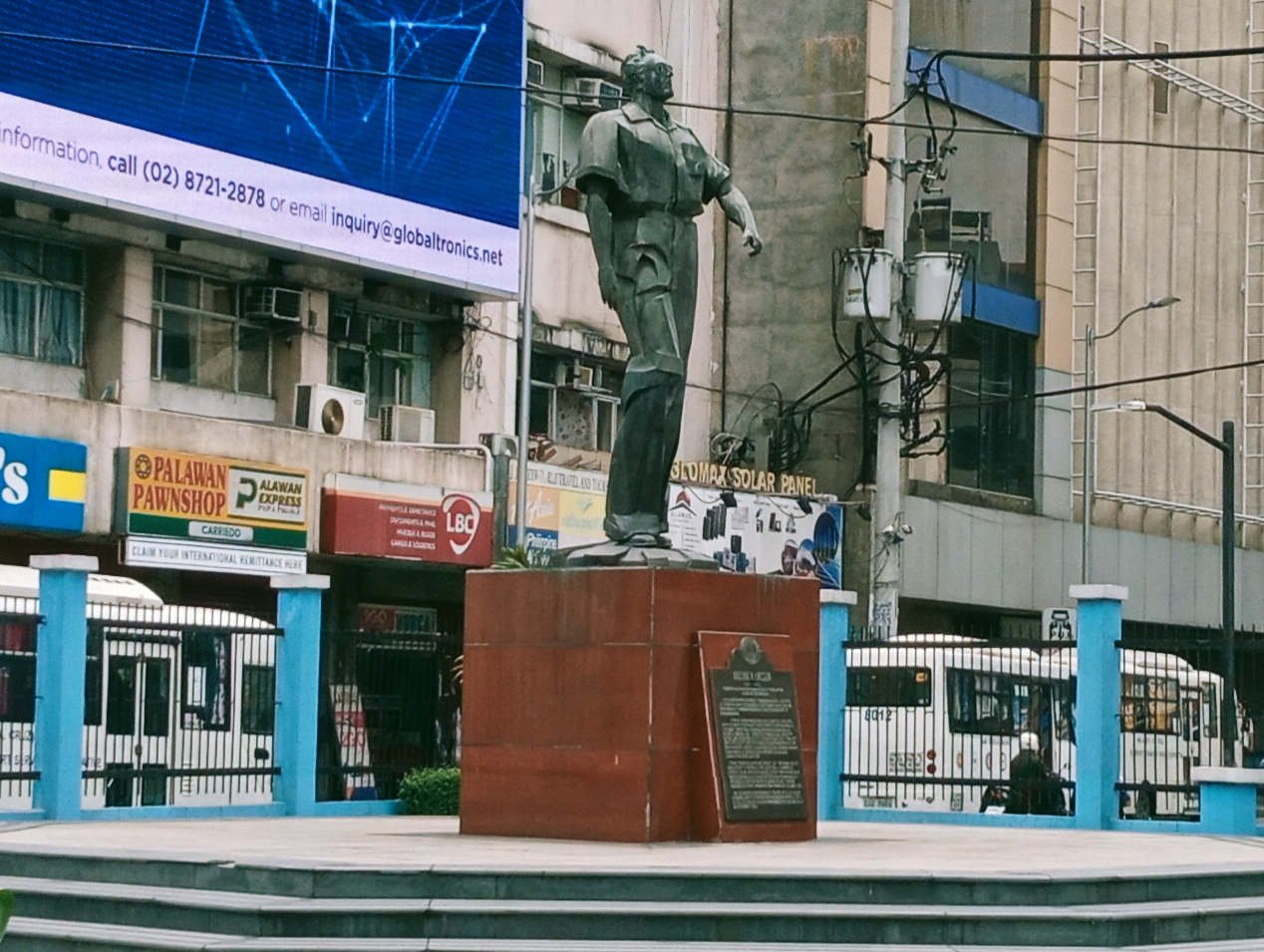
Arsenio Lacson Monument in Plaza Lacson (Formerly known as Plaza de Goiti), Santa Cruz, Manila

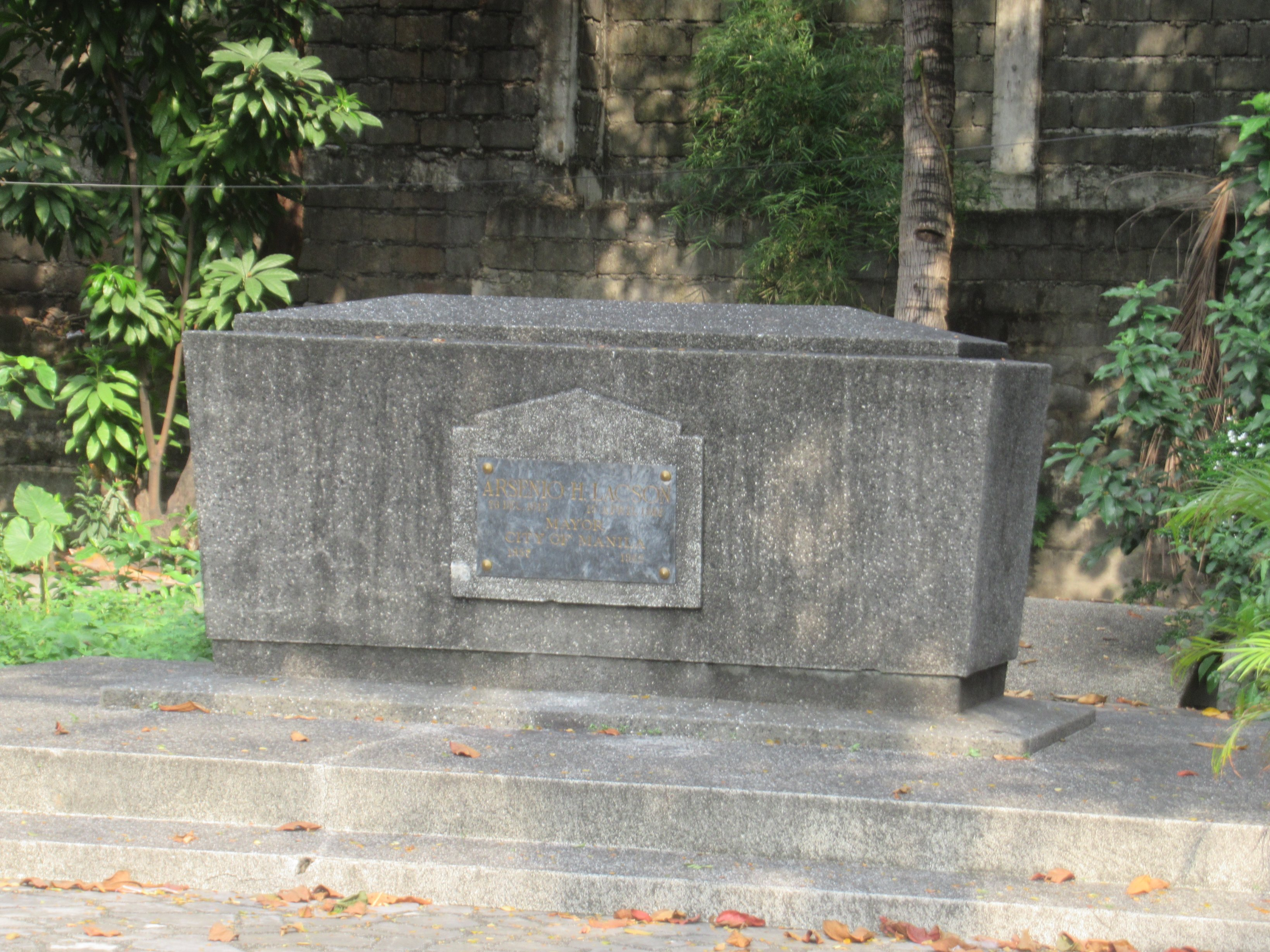
Lacson's tomb in Manila North Cemetery

== See also ==
- Lacson Avenue
- Plaza Lacson
- Lacson Underpass
- Gen. Aniceto Lacson
- Rose Lacson
- Lacson Family

== Notes ==
Political offices
Preceded by Manuel dela Fuente	Mayor of Manila; 1952–1962	Succeeded by Antonio Villegas
House of Representatives of the Philippines
Preceded by Hermenegildo Atienza	Member of the House of Representatives from Manila's 2nd district 1949–1952	Succeeded by Joaquin Roces
