= Plaza Lacson =

Public square in Santa Cruz, Manila, Philippines

- Public square
- {{{other_names}}}
- Former name: Plaza Goiti
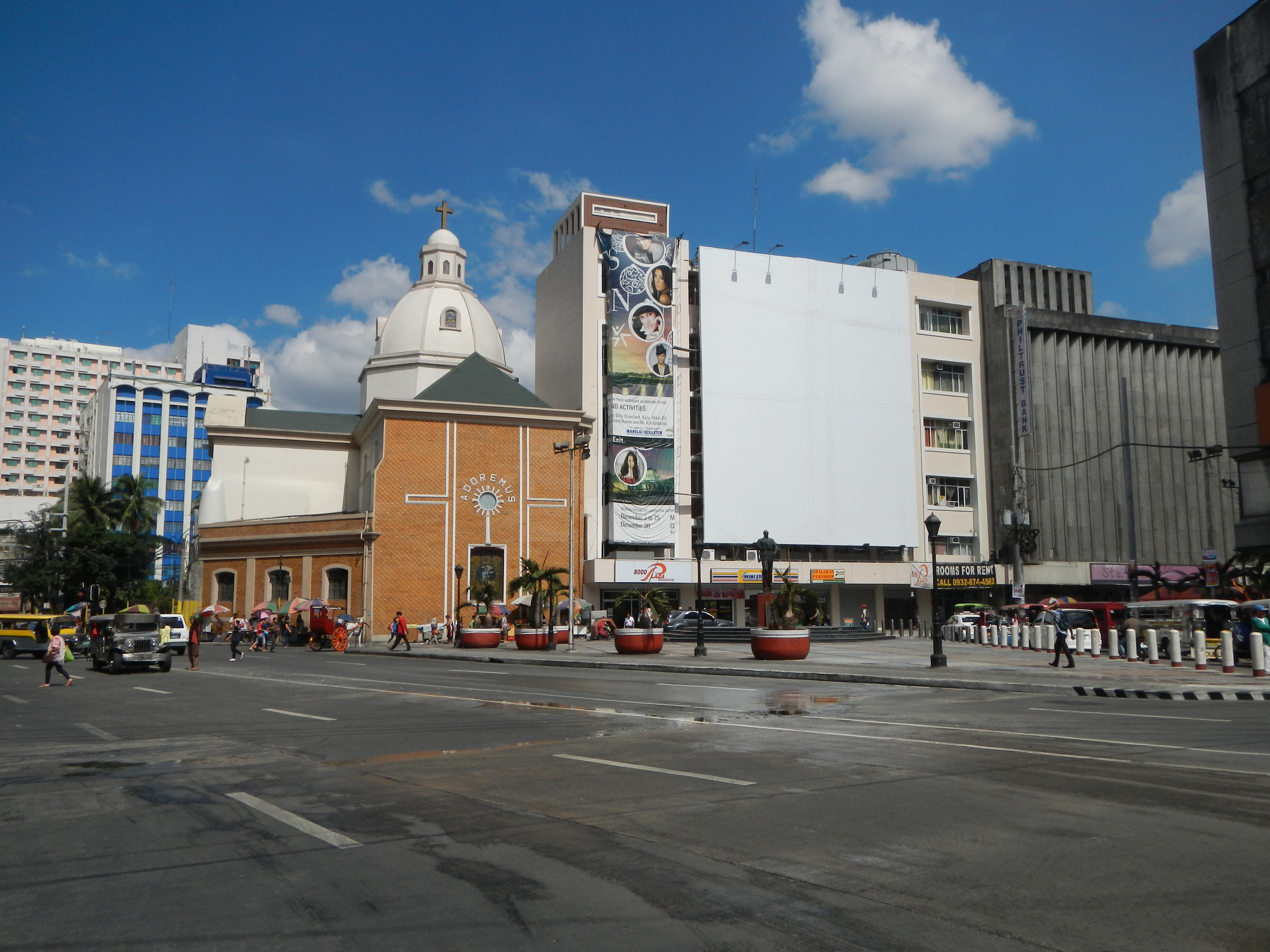
- Plaza Lacson in 2014. The center of the plaza is dominated by a statue of Arsenio Lacson, made in the 1970s by sculptor Eduardo Castrillo
- Dedicated to: Arsenio Lacson
- Owner: City of Manila
- Location: Carriedo Street, Santa Cruz, Manila, Philippines
- Interactive map of Plaza Lacson
- Coordinates: 14°35′56″N 120°58′51″E

Plaza Lacson, also known by its old name, Plaza (de) Goiti, is a public square in Santa Cruz, Manila. It is bounded by Plaza Santa Cruz Road and Escolta Street to the west, Carlos Palanca Street to the south, and Carriedo Street to the east. Although the plaza is not considered the center of Santa Cruz, as it is located behind the Santa Cruz Church rather than in front of it, the plaza is considered to be one of the most important squares in Manila.

Originally named after Martin de Goiti, who founded the City of Manila in 1571, it was renamed by Mayor Lito Atienza in 2003 after Arsenio Lacson, who previously served as mayor of Manila from 1952 to 1962.

== History ==
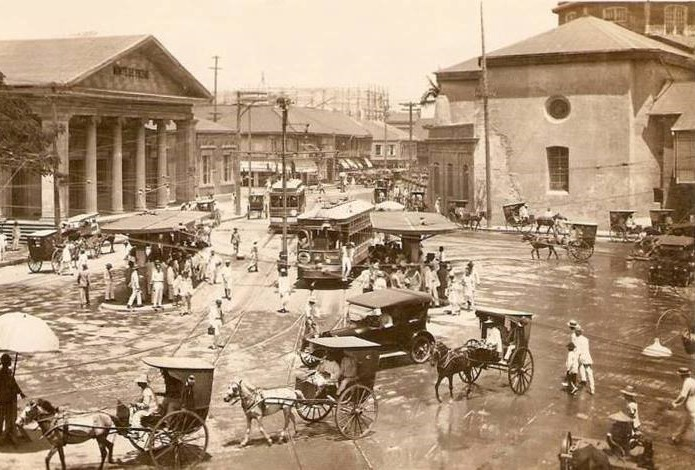
pre-World War II Plaza Goiti.

Prior to World War II, Plaza Lacson was considered the heart of Manila, and constituted part of the city's downtown area, which also included Plaza Santa Cruz, Rizal Avenue and Escolta Street. Commercial activity shifted to here from Binondo in large part due to infrastructure improvements made during the American colonial period to improve access to the northern half of the city, which were centered on the plaza. These included the completion of the Santa Cruz Bridge in 1902, and the opening of the Manila tram system a few years later, which had its central terminal at the plaza. The area around the plaza was largely commercial, with bars and restaurants that catered largely to American servicemen either visiting or stationed in the Philippines, complementing the luxury stores along Escolta and the theaters around Plaza Santa Cruz.

On June 21, 1919, the Philippines' first transport-related terrorist attack took place at the plaza, when a bomb hidden inside a parcel was lit by a Meralco mechanic as a tram was about to enter the Plaza Goiti station. Though discovered by the conductor, thus avoiding passenger casualties, the bomb killed a thirteen-year-old newsboy and injured eight other pedestrians after the conductor threw the bomb onto the street. The attack, which culminated five weeks after some 600 Meralco employees affiliated with the Congreso Obrero de Filipinas went on strike, not only derailed tram operations until mid-July, but also indirectly led to the 1920 Manila massacre, which led to the deaths of 11 people, including six policemen.

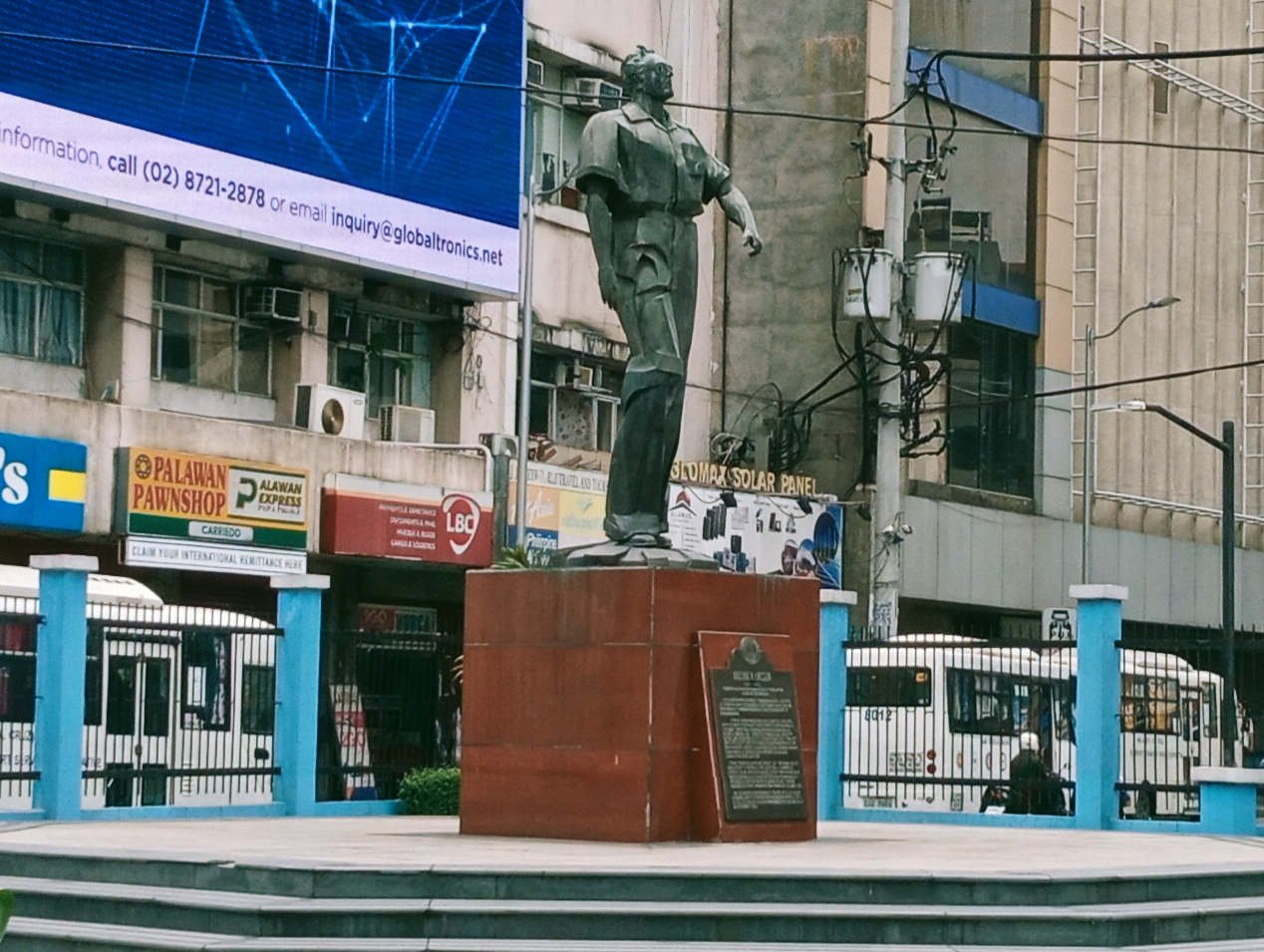
Lacson Monument in June 2024

Santa Cruz was largely spared from bombing during World War II, and after the war the plaza was still a center for business and commerce throughout much of the 1940s and 1950s. However, heavy traffic congestion contributed to the area's decline, with businesses eventually relocating to Makati. In the 1970s, under Mayor Ramon Bagatsing, a statue of Arsenio Lacson was erected in the middle of the plaza, created by Eduardo Castrillo.

In 2003, under Mayor Lito Atienza, the plaza was renamed Plaza Lacson and was pedestrianized as part of a wider pedestrianization of Rizal Avenue. However, in 2007, with the election of Alfredo Lim as mayor of Manila, the pedestrianized portions of the plaza were reopened to vehicular traffic.

== Surrounding buildings and structures ==
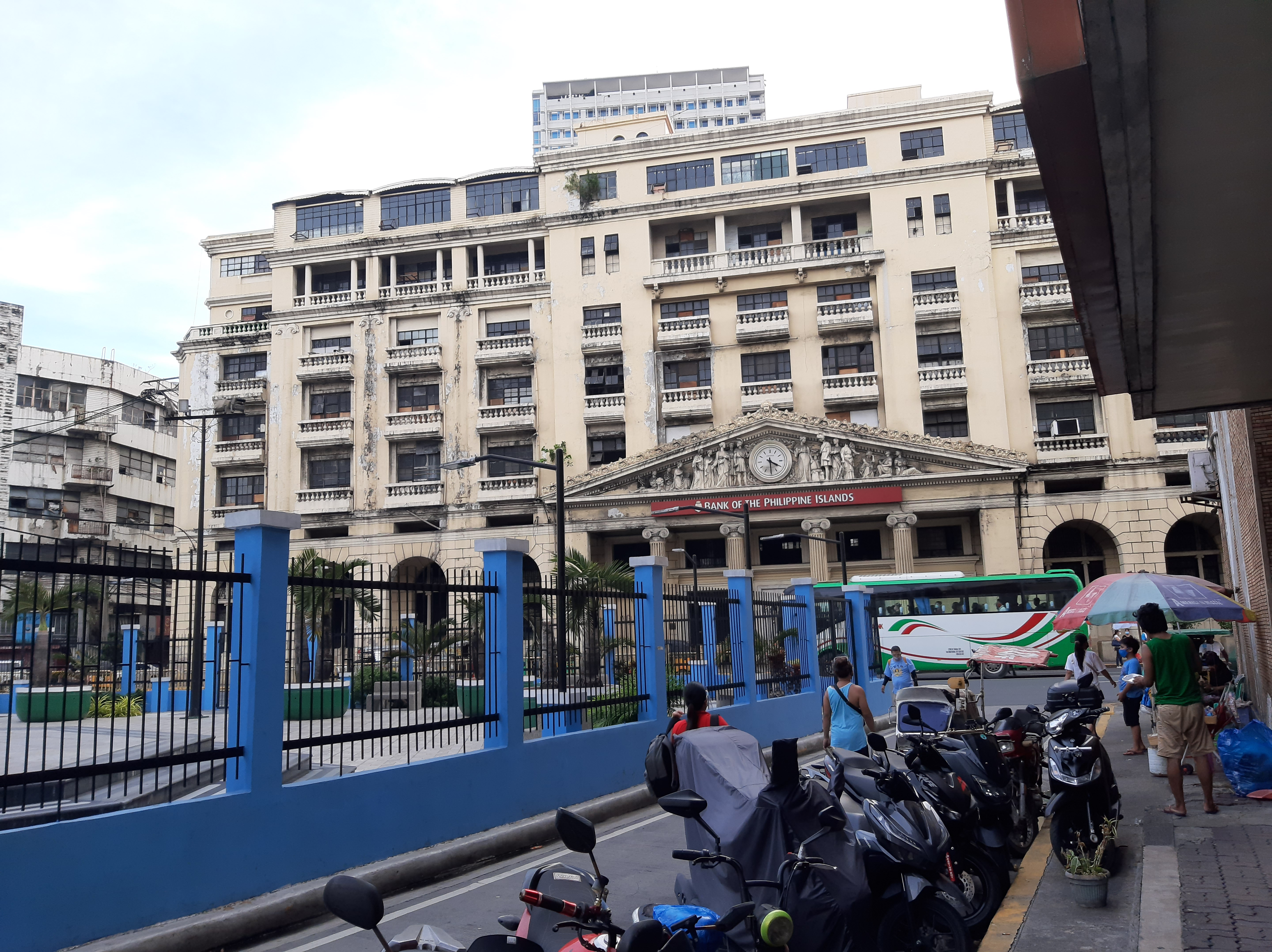
The Roman R. Santos Building is the major landmark of Plaza Lacson. First built in 1894, it is one of Manila's few surviving examples of pre-World War II neoclassical architecture.

A number of notable buildings and structures have been built in and around the vicinity of Plaza Lacson. Aside from the Santa Cruz Church on its north side, the plaza's most famous landmark is the Roman R. Santos Building, one of Manila's few surviving examples of pre-World War II neoclassical architecture. The building, first built in 1894 and expanded in 1957, was the headquarters of Prudential Bank until 2005, when it was acquired by Bank of the Philippine Islands (BPI). BPI continues to maintain a branch on the building's ground floor. Previously, however, the building was the headquarters of the Monte de Piedad Savings Bank, the former banking institution of the Catholic Church in the Philippines, from 1894 to 1937, and also served as an American Red Cross-operated hospital from 1945 to 1947.

Other Philippine financial institutions have had their headquarters around the plaza at some point in their history. Security Bank was headquartered at the ground floor of the Roman R. Santos Building from its establishment in 1951 until 1954, when the building was still under the ownership of its prior owner, Consolidated Investments. Philtrust Bank opened its headquarters at the plaza in 1950, located beside the Santa Cruz Church, and remained here until it relocated to its current headquarters along United Nations Avenue. The building still houses the bank's Santa Cruz branch.

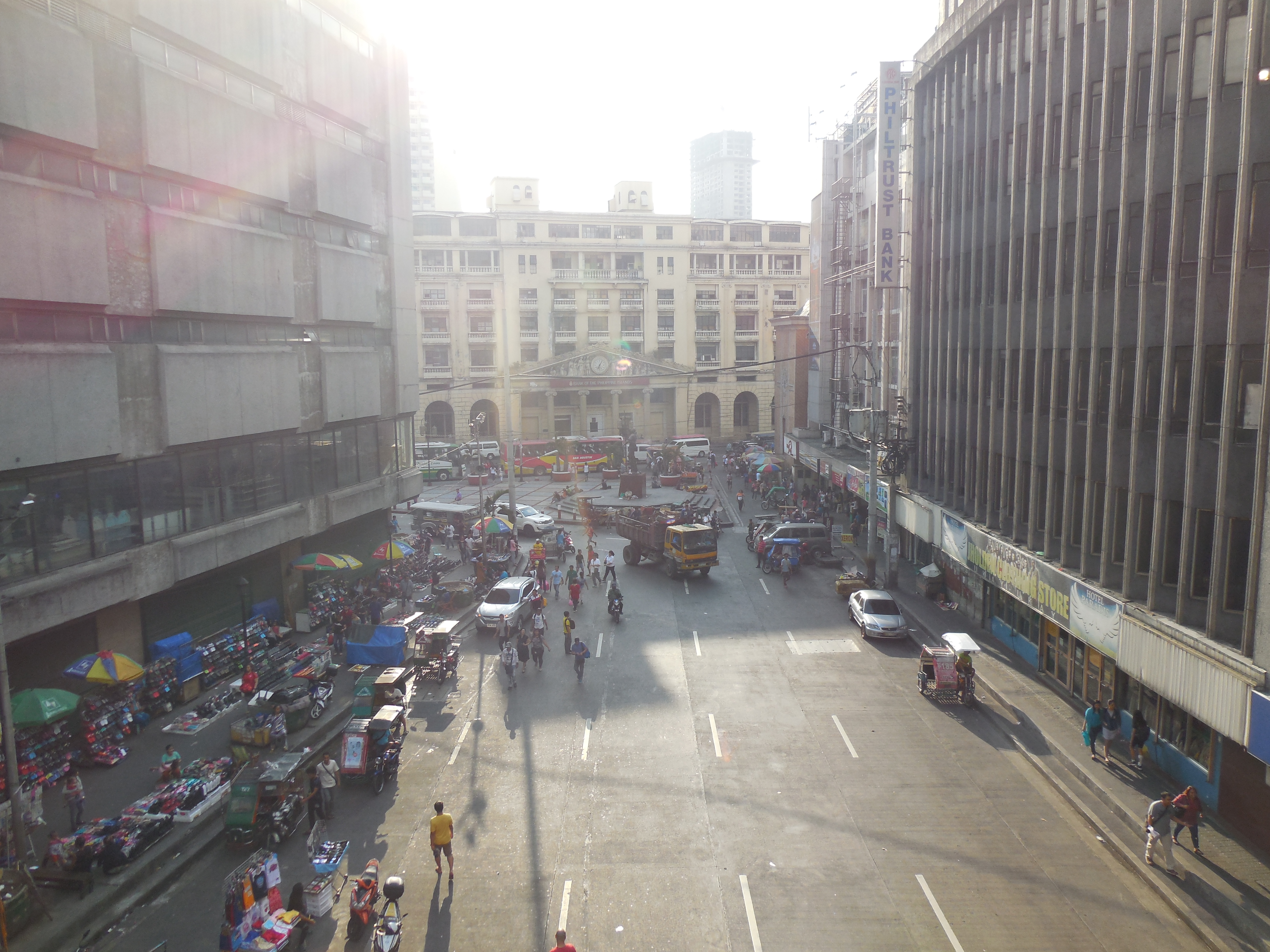
View from Carriedo Street (2017)

Located beside the Philtrust Bank building was the Ideal Theater, the first major building designed by Pablo Antonio, said to be the Philippines' foremost Modernist architect. Unfortunately, the building was demolished in the 1970s to make way for a shopping mall.

There are also significant transport-related structures which are in the vicinity of the plaza. The Philippines' first traffic light was installed in the plaza in 1938, and although Manila's tram network was dismantled after World War II, the LRT Line 1 Carriedo station is located on the opposite end of the plaza, at the intersection of Carriedo Street and Rizal Avenue.

== See also ==
- List of parks in Manila
- List of city squares
