= Astorga =

Astorga may refer to:

== Places ==
- Astorga, Spain, a municipality in the province of León, Castile and León, Spain
- Astorga, Paraná, a municipality in the state of Paraná, Brazil
- Roman Catholic Diocese of Astorga, a diocese whose seat is in the city of Astorga, Spain

== Sports ==
- Astorga FS, was a futsal club based in Astorga, Spain
- Atlético Astorga FC, a football team based in Astorga, Spain

== Other ==
- Astorga (surname)
