= Herminio A. Astorga =

Filipino athlete and politician

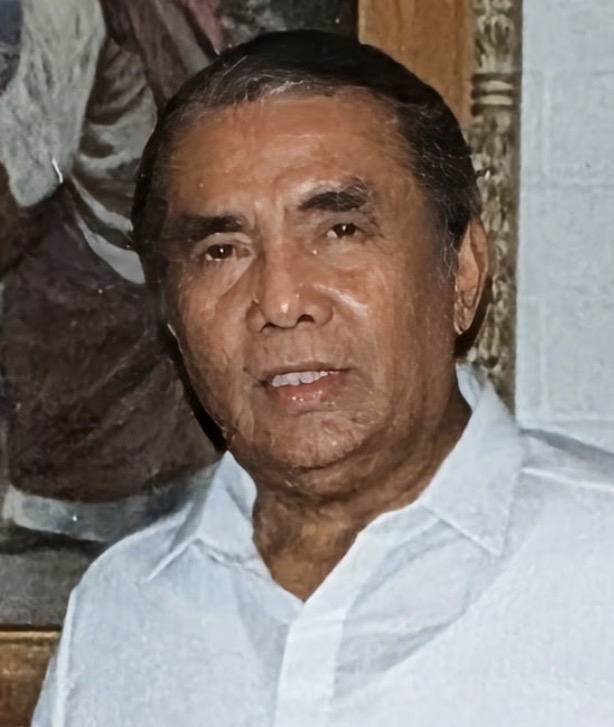

18th Vice Mayor of Manila
- In office April 16, 1962 – December 31, 1967
- Appointed by: Diosdado Macapagal
- Mayor: Antonio Villegas
- Preceded by: Antonio Villegas
- Succeeded by: Felicisimo Cabigao

Member of the Manila Municipal Board from the 4th district
- In office December 30, 1959 – April 16, 1962

Personal details
- Born: Herminio Aldaba Astorga; December 22, 1929 Malate, Manila, Philippine Islands
- Died: January 19, 2004 (aged 74) Allentown, New Jersey, United States
- Resting place: St. John’s Roman Catholic Cemetery, Allentown, New Jersey
- Party: Liberal
- Spouse: Erlinda Ira Vicente Astorga (m. 1957)
- Occupation: Politician, entrepreneur
- Basketball career

Career information
- High school: Letran (Manila)
- College: FEU

Career history
- 1940s: Malate Catholic Club

Career highlights
- NCAA men's basketball champion (1950); NCAA Rookie of the Year (1950); NCAA juniors' basketball champion (1948)

Herminio “Togay” Aldaba Astorga (December 22, 1929 – January 19, 2004) was a Filipino athlete and politician who served as the 17th Vice Mayor of Manila from 1962 to 1967. He was also a National Collegiate Athletic Association (Philippines) (NCAA) and University Athletic Association of the Philippines (UAAP) basketball player, college professor, entrepreneur, and Catholic lay leader.

== Biography ==
=== Early life ===
Astorga was born on December 22, 1929, in Malate, Manila to a poor family. His father was a driver from Barugo, Leyte and his mother was a vegetable vendor from Sibonga, Cebu.

He was known as “batang Rizal Memorial Stadium” during his youth because he did odd jobs at the Rizal Memorial Sports Complex (RMSC) such as being a tennis “pulot” boy, utility boy for baseball teams, and an assistant in the dressing rooms of the RMSC swimming pool. Further, he also worked as a bootblack, newsboy, market “cargador”, janitor, and a night pier stevedore at the Manila South Harbor.

=== Education and basketball career ===
When the Pacific War broke out, Astorga served the guerrillas in Malate and Ermita and was subsequently imprisoned and tortured by the Japanese soldiers. After Manila’s liberation in 1945, he was able to finish high school at the Colegio de San Juan de Letran on a basketball scholarship. He played center, forward, and guard positions. He played for the Malate Catholic Club basketball team, and aided in its 1948 tour of Mindanao, where the team won all its 33 matches.

In Letran, Astorga played for the Letran Squires and played during the team’s victory in the 1948 NCAA junior tournament as well as the 1949 national high school championship. Afterwards, he was voted the “Most Popular NCAA High School Player” in the nationwide contest sponsored by the now defunct Philippines Herald.

Shortly thereafter, despite still being a high school junior, Astorga was elevated by Letran’s Dominican Fathers and was allowed to play in the NCAA senior basketball tournament for the Letran Knights. This was a first in the history of the league. He played center on this team, helping the team to win the 1950 NCAA senior title. This set a new record for consecutive victories and earned the team the moniker “Murder, Inc.”. He was voted 1950 NCAA Rookie of the Year and held the record as top scorer for the entire season with 26 points.

Upon graduation from Letran, he enrolled to the Far Eastern University (FEU), also on a basketball scholarship. He majored in economics and graduated with a B.S.C. degree. He played for the FEU Tamaraws for two years before becoming a student leader. He was also a prominent member of the Student Catholic Action.

In 1953, Astorga led the underdog UAAP collegiate players to victory in the then prestigious annual ‘Challenge to Champions’ basketball tournament, beating the highly favored NCAA Selection and the MICAA All-Stars, which included Carlos Loyzaga and Lauro Mumar, respectively.

Astorga went on to complete post graduate studies in financial and credit management in the U.S. and London, taking graduate courses at Stanford University, MIT, Harvard Business School, and the Wharton School of Business. He earned an MBA degree in business and commerce. He also completed an M.A. in Public Administration. He received his Ph.D. degree in Political Science from the University of Santo Tomas Graduate School in Manila.

=== Political career ===
In 1959, Astorga was elected councilor for the fourth district of Manila under the Liberal Party during the incumbency of Mayor Arsenio Lacson. When Lacson died in 1962, Vice Mayor Antonio Villegas took over as mayor and President Diosdado Macapagal appointed Astorga to succeed Villegas as vice mayor of Manila.

As vice mayor, he was tapped by President Macapagal to act as national spokesman of his Moral Regeneration program. In 1964, he was the recipient of The Outstanding Young Men (TOYM) award for political leadership. He was the first athlete to receive this award. He was the first public official who proclaimed June 24 as Manila’s Foundation Day in 1962. Since then, the city has observed the event as “Araw ng Manila".

In 1967, he narrowly lost reelection to Councilor Felicismo Cabigao of the Nacionalista Party.

=== Later life ===
After leaving politics, Astorga taught courses in public administration, government, business, credit and management at the Graduate School of the University of Santo Tomas, as well as other colleges throughout Manila.

=== Death ===
Astorga died on January 19, 2004, due to a cerebral hemorrhage at the Robert Wood Johnson Hospital in Hamilton Township, Mercer County, New Jersey, and is buried at the St. John’s Roman Catholic Cemetery in Allentown, New Jersey.
