= Molinos de Duero =

- Municipality
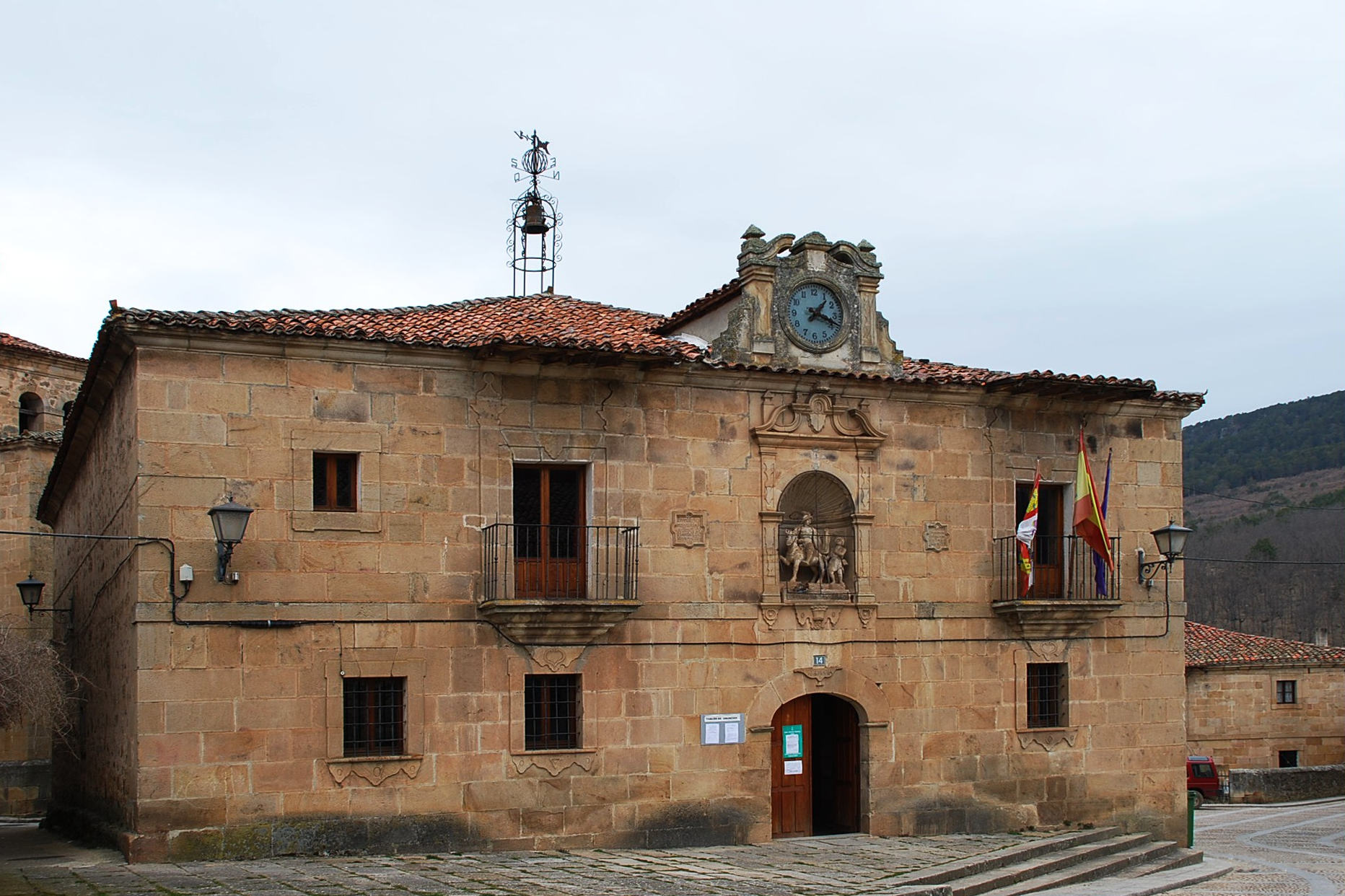
- Molinos de Duero Town Hall

- Coat of arms

- Location in Spain. Molinos de Duero (Spain)
- Coordinates: 41°53′07″N 2°47′15″W
- Country: Spain
- Autonomous community: Castile and León
- Province: Soria
- Municipality: Molinos de Duero

Area
  - Total: 27.39 km^{2} (10.58 sq mi)
- Elevation: 1,095 m (3,593 ft)

Population (2025-01-01)
  - Total: 162
  - Density: 5.91/km^{2} (15.3/sq mi)
- Time zone: UTC+1 (CET)
  - Summer (DST): UTC+2 (CEST)

Molinos de Duero is a municipality located in the province of Soria, Castile and León, Spain. According to the 2004 census (INE), the municipality had a population of 185 inhabitants.
