= Salduero =

- Municipality
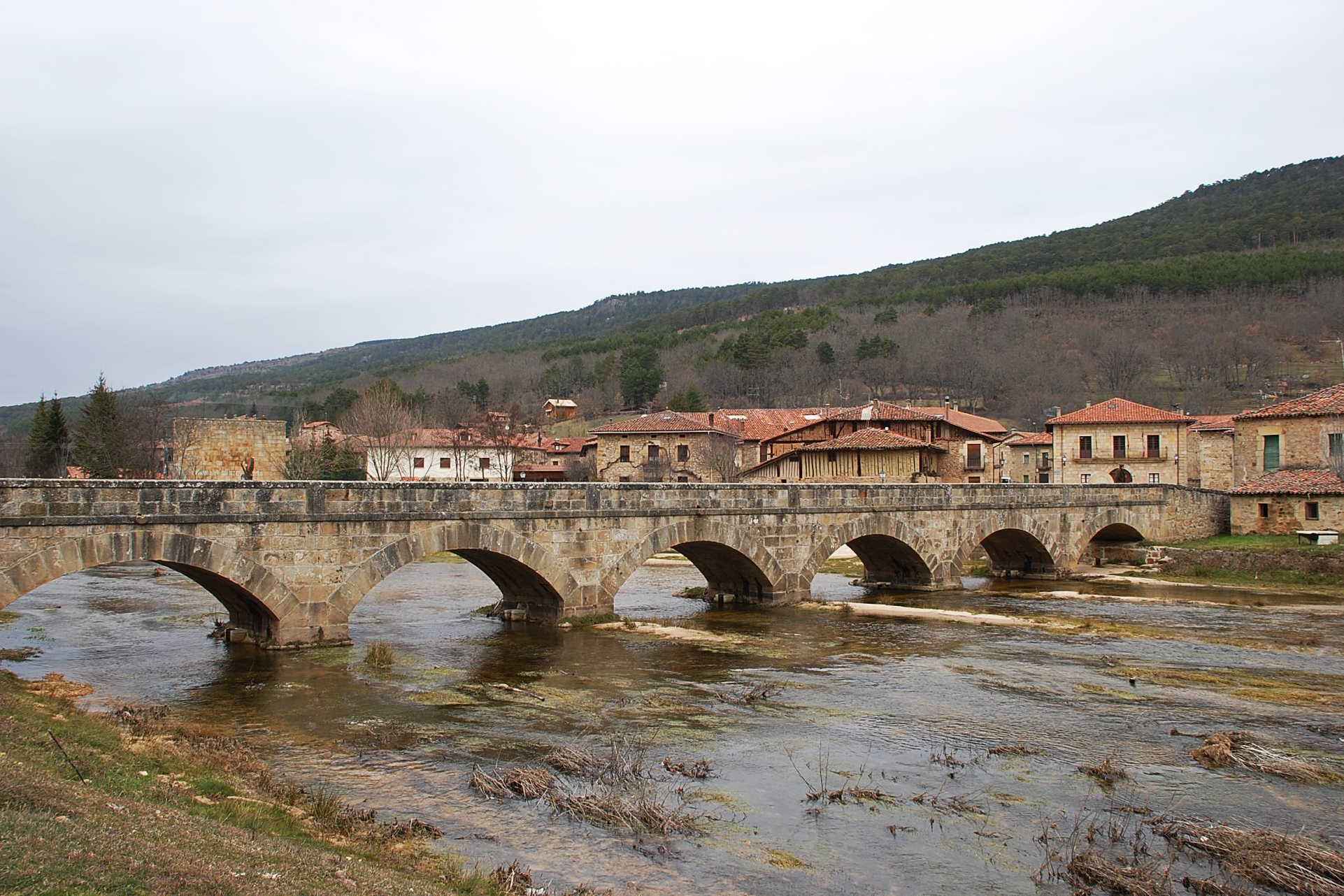

- Location in Spain. Salduero (Spain)
- Coordinates: 42°01′52″N 2°13′54″W
- Country: Spain
- Autonomous community: Castile and León
- Province: Soria
- Municipality: Salduero

Area
  - Total: 2.69 km^{2} (1.04 sq mi)
- Elevation: 1,103 m (3,619 ft)

Population (2025-01-01)
  - Total: 148
  - Density: 55.0/km^{2} (142/sq mi)
- Time zone: UTC+1 (CET)
  - Summer (DST): UTC+2 (CEST)
- Website: Official website

Salduero is a municipality located in the province of Soria, Castile and León, Spain. According to the 2004 census (INE), the municipality had a population of 193 inhabitants.
