= Baltazar Astorga =

Chilean footballer (born 1982)

Personal information
- Full name: Baltazar del Carmen Astorga Quezada
- Date of birth: 16 June 1982 (age 44)
- Place of birth: Curicó, Chile
- Height: 1.76 m (5 ft 9 in)
- Position: Centre back

Team information
- Current team: Deportes Antofagasta
- Number: 19

Youth career
- Universidad de Chile

Senior career*
Years	Team	Apps	(Gls)
2002–2003	Universidad de Chile	5	(0)
2003–2004	Antofagasta	67	(1)
2005–2006	O'Higgins	19	(0)
2007–2010	Cobresal	123	(0)
2011–2015	Antofagasta	69	(0)
2015–2016	Copiapó	0	(0)
- * Club domestic league appearances and goals as of 17 March 2012

Baltazar del Carmen Astorga Quezada (born 16 June 1982) is a Chilean former footballer.

== Honours ==
=== Club ===
Deportes Antofagasta

- Primera B (1): 2011 Apertura
