= El Royo =

- Municipality
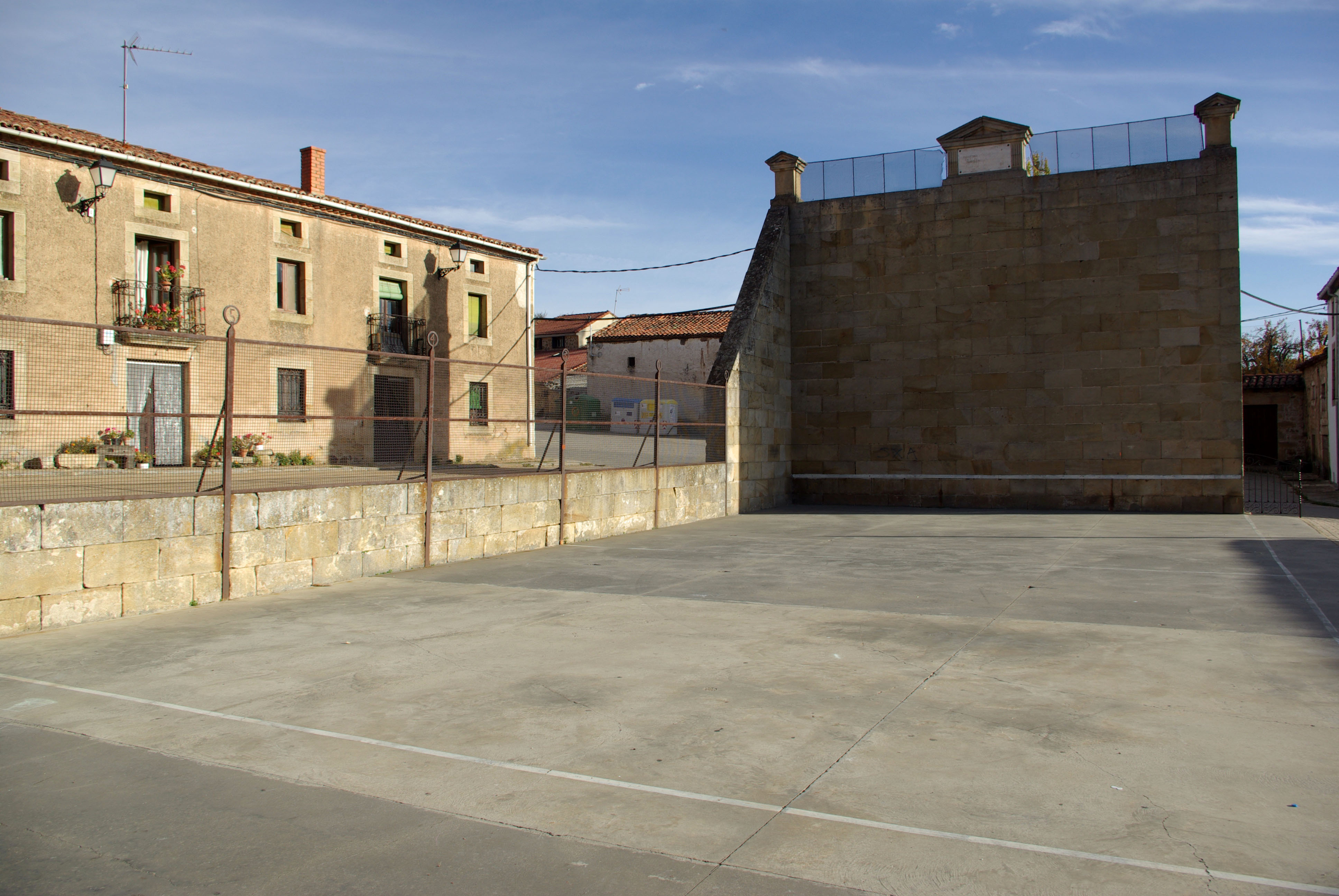

- Location in Spain. El Royo (Spain)
- Country: Spain
- Autonomous community: Castile and León
- Province: Soria
- Municipality: El Royo

Area
  - Total: 126 km^{2} (49 sq mi)

Population (2025-01-01)
  - Total: 248
  - Density: 1.97/km^{2} (5.10/sq mi)
- Time zone: UTC+1 (CET)
  - Summer (DST): UTC+2 (CEST)
- Website: Official website

El Royo is a municipality located in the province of Soria, Castile and León, Spain. According to the 2004 census (INE), the municipality had a population of 316.
