= Christina Astorga =

Filipino Catholic theologian and professor

Christina A. Astorga
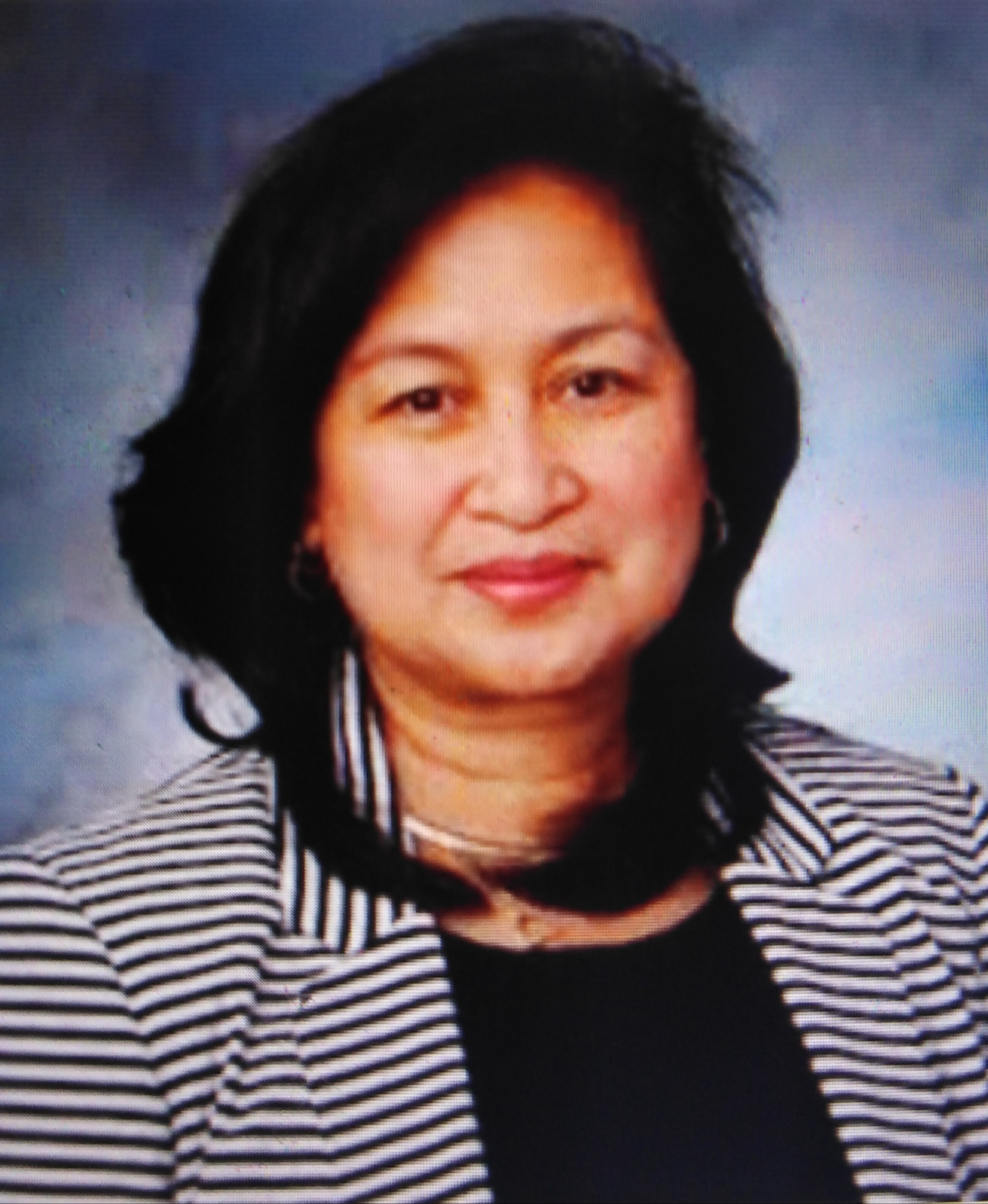
- Born: Philippines
- Other name: Tina
- Occupations: Writer; theologian; professor

Academic background
- Education: Ateneo de Manila University; College of the Holy Spirit Manila (1972)

Academic work
- Main interests: Moral theology; Christian ethics; Feminism; Liberation

Maria Christina A. Astorga is a Filipino theologian and professor at the Theology Department in University of Portland. She served as chair and Professor of Theology Department in Ateneo De Manila University.

== Education ==
She received her B.A. from College of the Holy Spirit Manila. She also received her Ph.D. and M.A. from the Loyola School of Theology in Ateneo de Manila University.

== Academic career ==
Astorga was an instructor at the College of the Holy Spirit Manila from 1972 to 1979. Between 1994 and 2003 she was a professor and chairperson of Theology Department at Ateneo de Manila University. She is a Fellow at the Jesuit Institute in Boston College and Woodstock Theological Center in Georgetown University; visiting professor at the University of San Diego, Canisius College, and Gonzaga University and is currently serving as a chairperson and professor at the Theology Department of University of Portland.

== Personal life ==
Astorga moved to the United States in 2003, after she was granted a sabbatical leave. As a Catholic theologian, she was known for being an outspoken critic of the Duterte government.

== Books ==
- Astorga, Christina (2013). Catholic Moral Theology & Social Ethics: A New Method. Orbis Books. ISBN 9781626980549.
- Astorga, Christina (1998). The Beast, the Harlot and the Lamb: Faith Confronts Systemic Evil. New Day Pub. ISBN 9711010003.
