= Antonio Villegas =

Filipino politician (1928–1984)

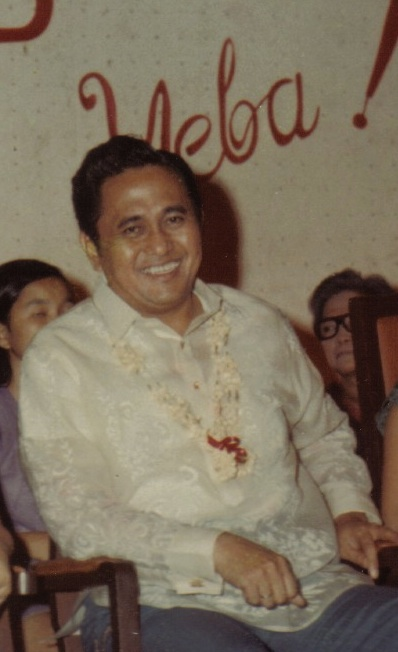
- Mayor Antonio J. Villegas in 1970

18th Mayor of Manila
- In office April 16, 1962 – December 31, 1971
- Vice Mayor: Herminio A. Astorga (1962–1967); Felicisimo Cabigao (1968–1969); Ernesto Maceda (1970); Danilo Lacuna (1970–1971); Mel Lopez (1971)
- Preceded by: Arsenio Lacson
- Succeeded by: Ramon Bagatsing

17th Vice Mayor of Manila
- In office December 30, 1959 – April 15, 1962
- Mayor: Arsenio Lacson
- Preceded by: Jesus Marcos Roces
- Succeeded by: Herminio A. Astorga

Personal details
- Born: Antonio de Jesus Villegas; January 9, 1928 Tondo, Manila, Philippine Islands
- Died: November 16, 1984 (aged 56) Reno, Nevada, U.S.
- Resting place: Manila North Cemetery, Manila, Philippines
- Party: Independent (1971); Liberal (until 1971)
- Spouse: Lydia Alano (m. 1953)

Antonio de Jesus Villegas (January 9, 1928 – November 16, 1984) was a Filipino politician who served as the 18th Mayor of Manila from 1962 to 1971. His term was after the term of Arsenio Lacson as mayor of Manila, and before the period of martial law in the Philippines.

== Political career ==
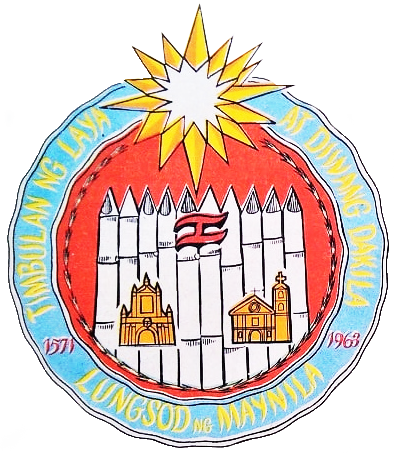
Seal of Manila introduced in 1965 during Villegas' term as mayor.

Villegas was elected as vice mayor of Manila in 1959 and became the city mayor when Arsenio Lacson died in April 1962 with over one year left on his term. On May 3, 1962, his wife Lydia was inducted as a member of the Board of Censors for Motion Pictures by President Diosdado Macapagal.

In 1963, he ran for reelection under the Liberal Party (LP) banner and won against Roberto Oca of the Nacionalista Party (NP).

Villegas inaugurated the Manila Film Festival (or the Manila Tagalog Film Festival) in 1966, the precursor of the modern Metro Manila Film Festival. Foreign films were banned from being screened during the duration of the film festival. The annual event was discontinued during the tenure of Villegas' successor Ramon Bagatsing in the 1970s.

In 1967, he ran again for reelection and won against NP Congressman Pablo Ocampo. His victory along with his party council members in Manila was the only major victory enjoyed by the LP in 1967. All of the LP senatorial candidates except for Benigno "Ninoy" Aquino were defeated by the opposing Nacionalista Party.

In 1971, then-Congressman Ramon Bagatsing was chosen by the Liberal Party to run for Manila mayor, while Vice-Mayor Felicisimo Cabigao remained NP's bet for mayor; Villegas was left without a party. He formed the Libre'ng Pilipino Party (LPP) to run for reelection as mayor in the 1971 local election, and selected journalist J.V. Cruz to be his running mate; Villegas ultimately lost to Bagatsing. In the police investigation into the Plaza Miranda bombing in August 1971, which was attended by members of the Liberal Party, Villegas was named the primary suspect of the bombing, but later evidence suggested otherwise.

== Later life and death ==
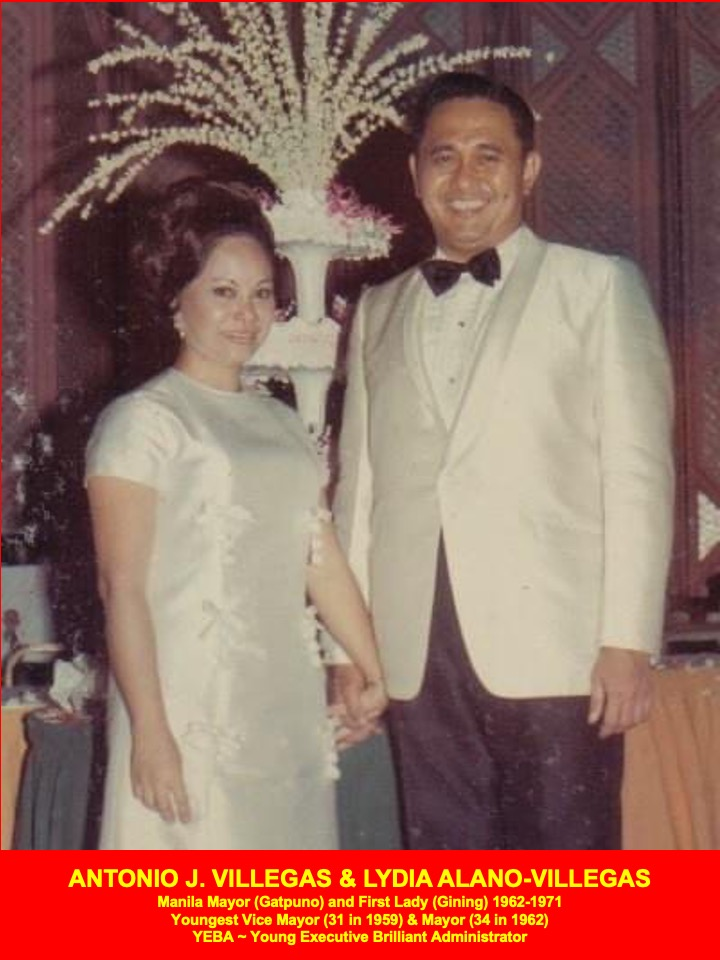
Mayor and Mrs Villegas

After losing in the 1971 local mayoral elections to then Manila Congressman Ramon Bagatsing, Villegas and his entire family emigrated to the United States.

He remained in Reno, Nevada, with his wife Lydia Alano Villegas, until his death on November 16, 1984. His remains were exhumed from Reno cemetery and flown to the Philippines in October 1997. A memorial ceremony was held in Manila City Hall. Eulogies by the Villegas family, then-Mayor Alfredo Lim, and Senator Blas Ople were given. Villegas's body was finally buried in a plot located along the rotunda of Manila North Cemetery.

== Writings ==
- Manila, 1962: Mayor Antonio J. Villegas reports (1963)
- Building a Better Manila (1963)
- Manila: Its Needs and Resources (1966)
- Dahong Alaala (1968)
- To End the Reign of Misery and Strife ... Libre'ng Pilipino (1971)

Political offices
Preceded by Arsenio Lacson	Mayor of Manila; 1962–1971	Succeeded by Ramon Bagatsing
Preceded by Jesus Marcos Roces	Vice Mayor of Manila; 1959–1962	Succeeded by Herminio A. Astorga
