= Free Philippines =

- 1942–1945
- Flag of the United States (left); Flag of the Philippines (right)
- Status: Unofficial provisional government over unoccupied and liberated territories
- Commander
  - 1942–1945: Wendell Fertig
- Historical era: World War II
  - Established: 1 October 1942
  - Disestablished: 1945
Preceded by	Succeeded by
Philippine Commonwealth	Philippine Commonwealth

The Free Philippine Government (Filipino: Pamahalaan ng Malayang Pilipinas) was an unofficial provisional government based in Oroquieta City, Misamis Occidental, Mindanao which claimed jurisdiction over unoccupied territories in the Philippines during the Japanese occupation of the Philippines during the World War II era.

== Background ==
American engineer, Wendell Fertig who served for the Allied forces as a reserve lieutenant colonel in the Battle of Corregidor in May 1942. Before the Fall of Corregidor, he was flown out of the island by a PBY flying boat which crashed in Mindanao. He decided to turn to guerilla warfare and worked together with a Philippine Constabulary captain in the island. In an effort to consolidate guerilla forces in the island he claimed to be a brigadier general under General Douglas MacArthur.

Having still not established contact with General Douglas MacArthur who was in-exile in Australia, Fertig declared martial law in Mindanao and assumed command of forces in the island. He proclaimed a "Free Philippine Government" and declared that the resistance against the Japanese occupiers in the Philippines continues. Fertig's forces were able to maintain partial control over parts of Mindanao repelling anti-Allied guerilla forces and providing electricity to towns in the island from 1942 to early 1943.

They also attempted to contact MacArthur through a suspended old code. Their messages were received by American forces in San Francisco which were ignored by the Americans due to suspicions that the message are part of a deception effort by the Japanese. Fertig sent 3 men to Australia who managed to retrieve a new simple code which would enable them to establish contact with Allied forces in Australia.

General MacArthur established contact with Fertig's forces in early 1943 and sought to put his forces under his command. Fertig's forces coordinated with MacArthur. However, in May 1943, the Japanese launched an offensive in Mindanao which saw large civilian casualties as the Japanese made Filipino internees do forced labor. Inexperience in guerrilla warfare by both the Japanese and Fertig's forces limited guerrilla casualties. Japanese atrocities led to the growth of guerrilla forces in Mindanao.

Fertig relayed intelligence report to MacArthur. When American forces landed in Leyte and Luzon, Japanese-loyal forces in Mindanao retreated to small lodgements. They coordinated with American forces when they landed in Mindanao to pursue remaining Japanese forces in the Philippine islands.

== Status ==
The status of the Free Philippines under Fertig as a sovereign state has been disputed. Jonathan Catubig through his study, They Lied Alone state that if such a state existed it was not "legally binding" and noted that actual territory controlled by the alleged government are limited to areas with established presence by Wendell Fertig's Tenth Military District. He argued that the term "Free Philippines" is a generic term which was sometimes used in propaganda broadcast and concludes that Fertig's Free Philippines is a mere product of the guerrilla leader's "ambition and illusion". He claims that the Philippine Commonwealth government in-exile or the Southwest Pacific area command never recognized Fertig's government.

== See also ==
- Second Philippine Republic
- Free France
