= Teodoro Locsin Sr. =

Filipino journalist and publisher

- Born: Teodoro Montelibano Locsin; December 24, 1914; Silay, Negros Occidental, Philippine Islands
- Died: January 21, 2000 (aged 85); Cebu City, Cebu, Philippines
- Resting place: Libingan ng mga Bayani, Taguig
- Other names: TLS, Teddy Sr., Ka Teddy
- Citizenship: Philippine
- Occupation(s): Journalist, publisher, poet
- Spouse: Rosario López
- Children: Henry Locsin; Ramon Locsin; Teodoro Locsin Jr.

Teodoro Montelibano Locsin (December 24, 1914 – January 21, 2000) was a journalist, publisher of The Philippines Free Press Magazine and father of former Secretary of Foreign Affairs Teodoro Locsin Jr.

== Early life ==
Teodoro Montelibano Locsin Sr. was born on December 24, 1914, in Silay City, Negros Occidental to a Chinese Filipino family.

Locsin attended public school from Grades I to IV and later transferred to the Ateneo de Manila where he stayed on until he completed his Associate in Arts degree. At the University of Santo Tomas, he took up law. After graduation, he immediately passed the bar and went into practice.

== Career ==
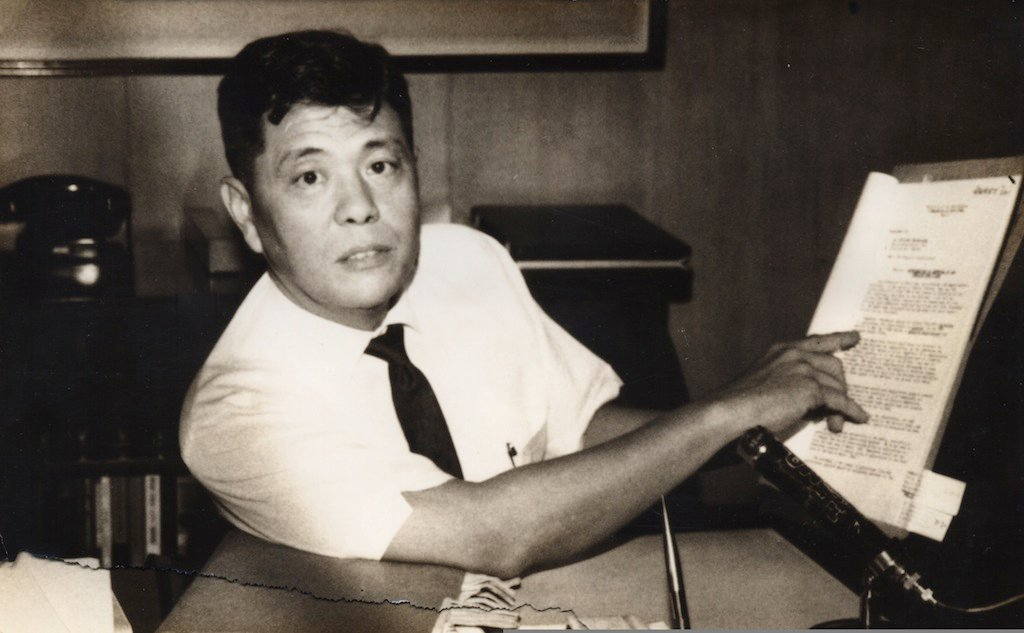
José W. Diokno, a friend of Locsin and fellow founder of the Free Philippines newspaper

He joined the Philippines Free Press magazine as an editorial member in 1939. This marked the start of his 61-year career in journalism. He assumed leadership of the magazine after Roger F. Theo, its editor and publisher, passed away.

During World War II, when the Free Press was shut down, Locsin fled to Negros Occidental to join the Philippine resistance against Japan. During this time, he met with friends and lawyers such as future senator José W. Diokno, future Manila mayor Arsenio S. Lacson, and a married member of the Manuel Quezon family Felipe Buencamino III or Phillip Buencamino to form the Free Philippines Newspaper. Diokno served as editor to their articles, especially Lacson's colorfully-worded essays, and was a mentor to the young Locsin, and according to Locsin he "was at the desk and more or less kept the paper from going to pieces as it threatened to do every day." The group would continue to write critical articles on the new independent republic until the Philippines Free Press returned. Upon resumption of the Philippines Free Press's operations, Locsin rejoined it and eventually became its editor in 1963.

Aside from his editorship of The Philippines Free Press, Locsin also penned The Heroic Confession, a novel about José Rizal, Fragments and Ruins, a collection of poems, Trial and Error, a collection of short stories, among others.

When Locsin was editor of the Philippines Free Press, one of the oldest and most respected weekly magazines in the country, the magazine was among those that repeatedly warned of a plan by then-president Ferdinand Marcos to implement martial law to stay in power. Thus, when Marcos declared martial law in 1972 the magazine was closed. Marcos detained Locsin in a military camp, Fort Andres Bonifacio, for several months, along with a fellow journalist, publisher Joaquin Roces, and thousands of other opposition leaders.

Locsin refused an offer by Marcos to return his printing press and publish his magazine again because he believed it would have been used by Marcos as a mouthpiece of the martial law government.

The magazine resumed publication shortly after Marcos was ousted in a People Power Revolution in February 1986.

== Recognition ==
Locsin's notable awards are the TOFIL Award, the Philippine Legion of Honor, "Outstanding Newspaperman for 1956” by the Confederation of Filipino Veterans, and “Rizal pro Patria Award” in 1961.

== Personal life ==
He was married to his wife, Rosario, and had three sons, Henry, Ramon and Teodoro Jr., former publisher and editor of the newspaper The Philippines Today.

== Death ==
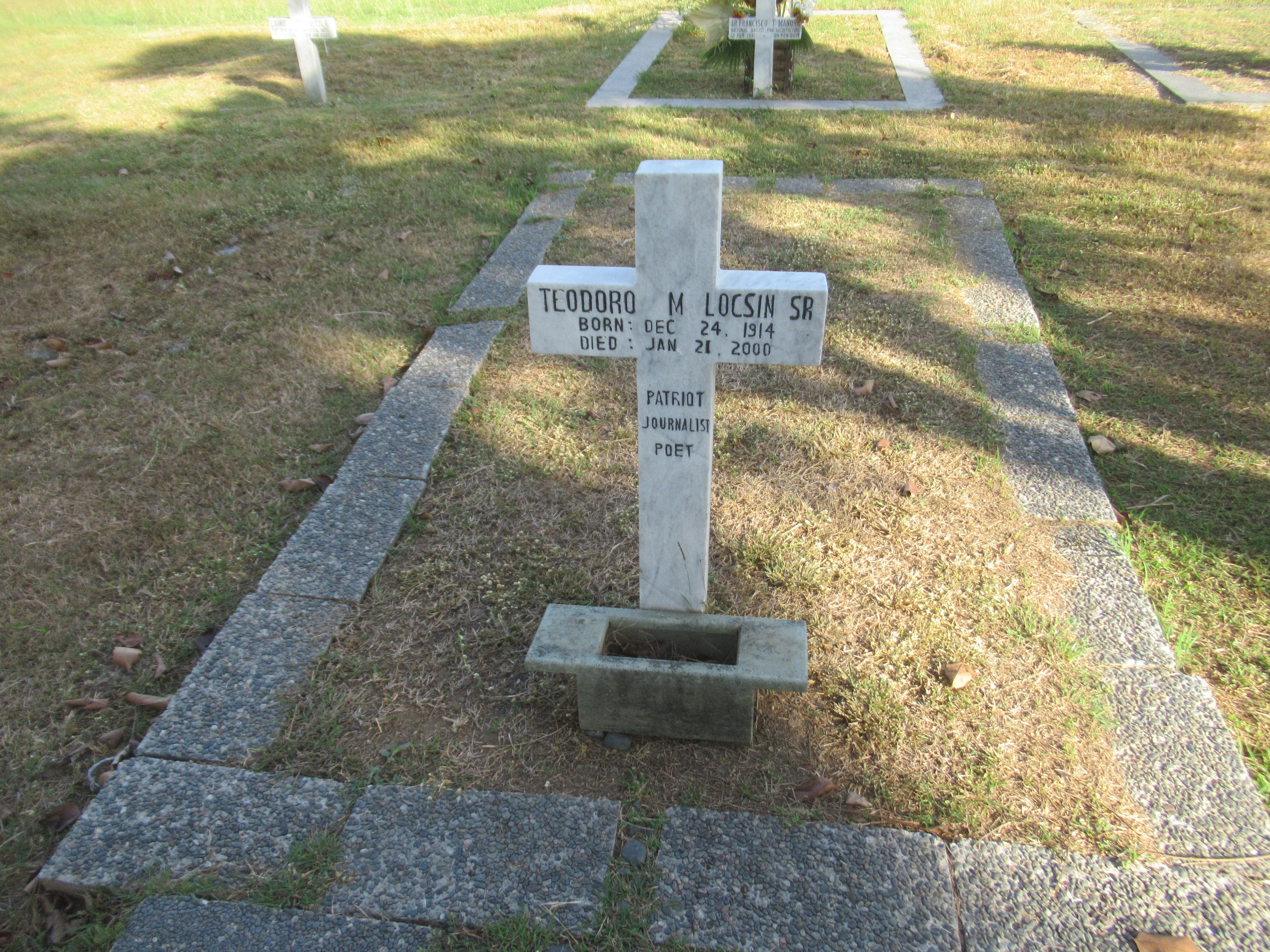
Locsin's grave at the Libingan ng mga Bayani

Teodoro Locsin Sr. died from cancer on January 21, 2000, at Vicente Sotto - Medical Center in Cebu City, a suburb of Cebu. Locsin had cancer of the colon that had spread to his liver as well as other illnesses associated with old age, his family said.
