= City of Man =

The City of Man was a re-branding campaign aimed to improve the image of Manila, the capital of the Philippines. The name was in reference to a shortened version of the name of Manila, and the campaign was launched by the Governor of Metro Manila and then first lady of the Philippines Imelda Marcos to reshape the city with an eye to world tourism, commerce and economic power and development. Under her campaign, several urban projects were undertaken to make Manila the world's center of international tourism and finance.

Elements of "City of Man" under Imelda's "imeldific" vision included the Cultural Center of the Philippines Complex, Folk Arts Theater, the Philippine International Convention Center, the "Bopis Hospitals" (Lung Center of the Philippines, Philippine Heart Center, the Kidney Center of the Philippines) and the Coconut Palace, all constructed precisely for this purpose. Nevertheless, due to the People Power Revolution which toppled her husband, the former dictator president Ferdinand Marcos, the campaign was put on hold as the Philippines attempted to recover from the damages of Marcos’ regime, and as of 2025 was never revisited.

== See also ==
- Edifice complex
