= Ramon Obusan =

Filipino dancer and artistic director

- Born: Ramon Arevalo Obusan; June 16, 1938; Legazpi, Albay, Philippines
- Died: December 21, 2006 (aged 68); Makati, Philippines
- Awards: Order of National Artists of the Philippines

Ramon Arevalo Obusan (June 16, 1938 – December 21, 2006) was a Filipino dancer, choreographer, stage designer and artistic director. Obusan is credited for his work in promoting Philippine traditional dance and cultural work. He is also an acclaimed archivist, researcher and documentary filmmaker who focused on Philippine culture. He also founded Ramon Obusan Folkloric Group in 1972. Among the awards Obusan received was the Patnubay ng Kalinangan award by the City of Manila in 1992, the Gawad CCP Para sa Sining award in 1993 and the prestigious National Artist of the Philippines for dance in May 2006.

== Works ==
Among Obusan's notable works are the following:

- Vamos a Belen! Series (1998-2004) Philippine Dances Tradition
- Noon Po sa Amin, tableaux of Philippine History in song, drama and dance
- Obra Maestra, a collection of Ramon Obusan's dance masterpieces
- Unpublished Dances of the Philippines, Series I-IV
- Water, Fire and Life, Philippine Dances and Music--A Celebration of Life
- Saludo sa Sentenyal
- Glimpses of ASEAN, Dances and Music of the ASEAN-Member Countries
- MJ (Ramon Obusan Folkloric Group): Philippines Costumes in Dance

In 2026, the Ramon Obusan Folkloric Group Audiovisual Archive was included in the UNESCO Memory of the World Regional Register.

== Death ==
Obusan died on December 21, 2006, due to cardio-pulmonary arrest at the Makati Medical Center. Up to the time of his death, the annual Christmas program Vamos A Blen at the Cultural Center of the Philippines was at his oversight. Obusan was also preparing for the cultural presentation to be made during the state dinner for the 2007 ASEAN Summit to be hosted by then President Gloria Macapagal Arroyo.
