= Day by Day Christian Ministries =

Philippine evangelical Christian church

Day By Day Jesus Ministries (formerly Day By Day Christian Ministries)
- Classification: Protestant
- Orientation: Evangelical Christian
- Governance: Non-hierarchical
- Region: Worldwide, concentrated mostly in the Middle East, North America, and Southeast Asia
- Headquarters: Day By Day Center, Brgy. Pio del Pilar, Makati, Philippines
- Founder: Rev. Eduardo "Ed" M. Lapiz, PhD.
- Origin: June 6, 1985; Riyadh, Saudi Arabia
- Congregations: (no official count)
- Members: 6,000 (regular Sunday attendees at the Folk Arts Theatre only)
- Aid organization: Kuya Cares Ministry
- Official website: daybydayjesusness.com

Day By Day Jesus Ministries (formerly Day By Day Christian Ministries), also known as DBD, is a non-denominational evangelical Christian mega-church organization headquartered in Makati, Philippines. Its primary worship center is located at the Philippine International Convention Center, Metro Manila, Philippines.

It was founded on June 6, 1985, in Riyadh, Saudi Arabia, and currently active in the Philippines and Middle East.

== History ==
Eduardo Lapiz, a pastor, facilitated daily Bible studies until 1985, when he began organizing prayer meetings in Riyadh with OFWs, marking the start of the organization.

=== Church in the Philippines ===
In 1991, Pastor Lapiz established the first congregation in a small room at the McDouton Building in Quezon City. The organization eventually acquired a building on Leon Guinto Street in Manila, which became the site of the Church Administration. Eventually, another building was acquired in Makati, where the Church Administration later moved.

Church missions expanded within the Philippines and the Middle East. Worship services were held in cinema theaters, including Shangri-La Mall, Glorietta, and Makati Cinema Square, until 2005. That year, the church leased the Folk Arts Theater at the Cultural Center of the Philippines Complex, dedicating it as the Bulwagan ng Panginoon (Hall of the Lord). The Bulwagan became a venue for Sunday worship services and performances by the church's groups. The Church still has the Makati Center as one of its outreaches.

In 2012, Day By Day Church established a new branch at the Better Living Tricycle Terminal in Barangay Don Bosco, Parañaque.

=== Global expansion ===
The establishment of churches in North America began in the 1990s, with additional congregations added over time. By the early 2000s, the church expanded to Japan and continued to grow in non-Muslim countries, including Singapore and New Zealand.

== Ministries ==
Day by Day Christian Ministries actively promotes the integration of Filipino arts in worship. Through its ministry, the KALOOB Philippine Dance and Music Ministry, the church uses Philippine culture, dance, and music for use in Christian worship and liturgy. Kaloob (literally meaning 'Gift') specializes in researching, reinterpreting, and promoting Indigenous Philippine music.

== Radio programs ==
Day by Day Christian Ministries operates several radio programs across the Philippines, including the show Day by Day, which aired on DZAS-AM until July 31, 2024. Beginning on August 1, 2024, Day by Day transitioned to daily broadcasts on DWBL-AM. The church also manages three official websites.

== See also ==
- DZAS
- Evangelicalism
