= Sofitel Philippine Plaza Manila =

Hotel in Pasay, Metro Manila, Philippines

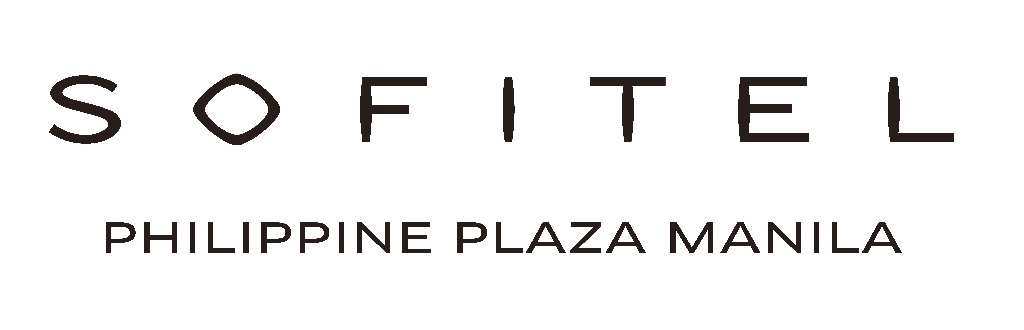
- Hotel logo

- Sofitel Philippine Plaza Manila in 2010
- Interactive map of the Sofitel Philippine Plaza Manila area
- Former names: Philippine Plaza; Westin Philippine Plaza

General information
- Status: Closed
- Location: Cultural Center of the Philippines Complex, Bay City, Manila Bay Freeport Zone, Pasay, Philippines
- Coordinates: 14°33′10″N 120°58′52″E
- Construction started: 1973; 53 years ago
- Opening: September 26, 1976; 49 years ago
- Renovated: 1994; 1995; 2007
- Closed: July 1, 2024; 20 months ago
- Management: Westin Hotel Company (until 2005); AccorHotels (2006–2024)

Technical details
- Floor count: 15

Design and construction
- Architects: Leandro Locsin; Isidro Santos
- Architecture firm: Leandro V. Locsin & Partners

Other information
- Number of rooms: 609
- Number of suites: 46
- Number of restaurants: 2
- Number of bars: 4
- Parking: 1

Website
- www.sofitelmanila.com

The Sofitel Philippine Plaza Manila, formerly known as the Westin Philippine Plaza and Philippine Plaza is a defunct luxury hotel in Pasay, Metro Manila, Philippines that was under the Sofitel brand by AccorHotels since 2005 and under the Westin brand until 2005.

== History ==
=== Construction and opening ===
Originally named the Philippine Plaza, it was built during the martial law era administration of President Ferdinand Marcos.

It was one of twelve luxury hotels rushed to construction using funds drawn from Philippine Government finance institutions at the behest of First Lady Imelda Marcos, with the intention of presenting an impression of luxury to the 2000 delegates who would attend the 1976 Annual Meetings of the International Monetary Fund and the World Bank, which would be held in Manila that year, and is considered one of the examples of the Marcos couple's "edifice complex" fondness for the use of construction projects as political propaganda.

It stands on land which was originally part of the Cultural Center of the Philippines Complex and is owned by the Government Service Insurance System (GSIS).

=== Management and renovation history ===
Sofitel Philippine Plaza Manila at dusk

The hotel became known as the Westin Philippine Plaza and was managed under the Westin brand until the management contract with Starwood hotels ended in 2005. The Westin Hotel Company made renovations on the hotel in 1994 and July 1995. In 2006, the hotel signed a new management contract with AccorHotels.

The following year, after extensive renovation works worth millions of pesos, the hotel was rebranded as Sofitel Philippine Plaza.

=== Closure ===
In May 2024, the hotel management announced that the hotel would close due to safety concerns following 27 fire reports within the year and possible deterioration of the building's water pipes and electrical wiring. Sofitel closed on July 1, 2024 as scheduled.

The contract of hundreds of the hotel's workers was consequentially terminated due to the closure. However, the National Union of Workers in Hotel, Restaurant and Allied Industries (NUWHRAIN) claims the closure is a pretext for union busting with NUWHRAIN stating that an alleged lease extension of the hotel owner with the GSIS to 2041 contradicts this suggesting plans to eventually reopen the Sofitel. As a result of collective bargaining, a deal would be agreed upon guaranteeing the rehiring of workers should the hotel reopen under the same company, and respecting the existence of NUWHRAIN's involved member unions.

== Design and features ==
The hotel itself was designed by Leandro Locsin of Leandro V. Locsin & Partners, who would later be named a National Artist of the Philippines for architecture, and Isidro Santos.

In 1994, 12 years before the AccorHotels group took over ownership from Westin, the hotel hosted 670 guest rooms. In 2016, it hosted 609 rooms and 46 suites. It also features two restaurants, including the reputable Spiral Manila buffet restaurant, and four bars.

The hotel hosts the Grand Plaza Ballroom which can accommodate between 1,000 and 1,400 people. For smaller functions, the ballroom can be divided into three smaller ballrooms that are given names of the country's three major island groupings: Luzon, Visayas, and Mindanao. The ballroom underwent a major renovation in 2014. Some of the ballroom's features designed by Locsin have been kept, most notably the Murano crystal chandeliers, which have been a fixture of all the rooms since the hotel's opening. The hotel management partnered with A. Ilustre and Associates for the renovation, while the architect firm in turn consulted architect Raul R. Locsin who works for the original firm behind the hotel.

== Political visits ==
The hotel over the past 48 years of its operations also became the go to hotel for foreign politicians. This most notably included former U.S. President Barack Obama checked in at the “Imperial Residence” of the hotel in 2014. And in 2016, Japanese Emperor Akihito and Empress Michiko’s 5 day visit to the Philippines.
