= Sa ikauunlad ng bayan, disiplina ang kailangan =

Filipino political catchphrase

The slogan "Sa ikauunlad ng bayan, disiplina ang kailangan" (Filipino for "For the nation's progress, discipline is needed") was a political catchphrase created by the administration of Philippine President Ferdinand Marcos after his declaration of martial law, as a justification for his authoritarian rule and in an effort to promote the "new society". Continuing the racist trend of government propaganda from the Philippines' Spanish and American colonial periods to portray Filipinos as children unable to govern themselves, the slogan was used to justify the "disciplining" of Philippine society by a "benevolent strongman" who knows what is best and who could therefore "lead the country through a period of chaos".

However, Ariel Ureta, one of the TV personalities during Martial Law mocked the slogan into "Sa ikauunlad ng bayan, bisikleta ang kailangan" (Filipino for "For the nation's progress, bicycles are needed"). After that mocking, he was allegedly caught by the Philippine Constabulary (PC) and was sent to Camp Crame, where he required to ride a bicycle within the whole PC headquarters. Ureta later denied the story.

== See also ==
- Kilusang Bagong Lipunan
- Marcos propaganda
