= Edifice complex =

Practice of publicly funded construction projects as propaganda

The Coconut Palace is one of the buildings commonly cited as an example of the Marcos dictatorship's edifice complex.

The term "edifice complex" was coined in the 1970s to describe Philippine First Lady Imelda Marcos' practice of using publicly funded construction projects as political and election propaganda.

Typically built with a Brutalist architectural style, perhaps to emphasize their grandiose character, these construction projects were funded by foreign loans, allowing the incumbent Marcos administration to create an impression of progress. The first of the crises occurred in 1970, which many economic historians consider to have triggered the socioeconomic unrest which later led Marcos to impose martial law in 1972.

The expression has also been generalized outside of the context of Imelda and Ferdinand Marcos and the Philippines.

== Etymology ==
The term is a play-on-words alluding to the "Oedipus complex" of psychoanalytic theory.

While earlier use of the term elsewhere in the world has been suggested, the term was independently coined by Behn Cervantes to criticise the construction of the Cultural Center of the Philippines during the buildup to the 1969 presidential election campaign, during which Imelda Marcos' husband Ferdinand Marcos was running for a then-unprecedented second term as President of the Philippines.

Deyan Sudjic, in his 2005 book The Edifice Complex: How the Rich and Powerful Shape the World, generalizes the term, expanding it outside of the context of Marcos and the Philippines. He writes:

There is a psychological parallel between making a mark on the landscape with a building and the exercise of political power. Both depend on the imposition of will. Certainly, seeing their worldview confirmed by reducing an entire city to the scale of a doll's house in an architectural model has an inherent appeal for those who regard the individual as of no account. ...

Architecture feeds the egos of the susceptible. They grow more and more dependent on it to the point where architecture becomes an end to itself, seducing the addicts as they build more and more on an even larger scale.

Building is the means by which the egotism of the individual is expressed in its most naked form: the Edifice Complex.

Sudjic goes on to explore many instances of the complex both historically and in the modern world, including the example of Imelda Marcos and her architect, Leandro V. Locsin.

== Commonly cited examples in the Philippines ==
The Manila Film Center. After scaffolding collapsed during construction, at least 169 workers fell and were buried under quick-drying wet cement.

Buildings cited as examples of the Marcos era edifice complex include the buildings of the Cultural Center of the Philippines complex (conceived in 1966), the San Juanico Bridge (conceived in 1969), the Philippine International Convention Center (conceived in 1974), the Philippine Heart Center (conceived in 1975), the National Arts Center in Los Baños, Laguna (inaugurated in 1976), Coconut Palace (conceived in 1978), the Lung Center of the Philippines (conceived in 1981), the National Kidney and Transplant Institute (conceived in 1981), and Terminal 1 of Manila International Airport (completed in 1981).

There were also twelve luxury hotels rushed to construction using funds drawn from Philippine Government finance institutions at the behest of First Lady Imelda Marcos, with the intention of presenting an impression of luxury to the 2,000 delegates who would attend the 1976 Annual Meetings of the International Monetary Fund and the World Bank, which would be held in Manila that year, This included: the Philippine Plaza Hotel, which would later be renamed the Sofitel Philippine Plaza Manila; the Admiral Hotel; the Century Park Sheraton; the Holiday Inn Manila; Hotel Mirador; Manila Garden Hotel; the Manila Mandarin; the Philippine Village Hotel, Manila Midtown Ramada; the Manila Peninsula; the Regent of Manila; and the Silahis Hotel. The historic Manila Hotel was also renovated, and expanded to a 570 room capacity.

The 1976 Tondo evictions which were part of the "Tondo Urban Renewal Project" and the deaths of construction workers at the Manila Film Center are also cited as signs of Imelda having the complex.

The "designer hospitals" were particularly criticized as wrongly prioritized healthcare projects, draining public funds for the benefit of only a handful of patients, while basic health institutions, such as the Quezon Institute for Tuberculosis Patients, were overcrowded and underfunded.

=== Destruction of Mt. Sungay ===
One other example, which was never completed, was the Palace in the Sky complex in Tagaytay, Cavite, which Imelda intended to host the visit of US President Ronald Reagan. The construction of the palace, which was suddenly stopped when Reagan canceled his visit, drastically changed the landscape of the Cavite highland, because preparations for the construction meant leveling the geographically distinct Mount Sungay.

When the People Power Revolution in 1986 overthrew the Marcoses, the new government renamed the palace as the People's Park in the Sky, opening it to the public to help demonstrate the excesses of the ousted regime.

== In popular culture ==
American humorist Jean Shepherd used the term in a short story, "Ludlow Kissel and the Dago Bomb that Struck Back." Shepherd wrote: "All around me New York was busily, roaringly, endlessly rebuilding itself, like some giant phoenix rising from the red-hot ashes of its dead self. New York's incurable Edifice Complex blooms mightily in midsummer." The story was first published in the July 1965 issue of Playboy and later appeared in Shepherd's 1966 book, In God We Trust: All Others Pay Cash.

The term was mentioned in the contemporary 1974 disaster film The Towering Inferno in which the developer of the ill-fated skyscraper was maneuvering with a U.S. Senator to secure federal funding for similar buildings around the United States.

In episode 39 of the 1990s television sitcom Home Improvement, titled "Love is a Many Splintered Thing," main character Tim Taylor's next door neighbor, Wilson, jokes that Tim has "an edifice complex" due to the fact that he is a handyman who enjoys building things.

The term is again mentioned in the 1997 James Bond movie Tomorrow Never Dies when, after being captured by Stamper and taken to the CMGN tower in Saigon (from which Elliot Carver has hung a large banner featuring his face), James Bond remarks: "Another Carver Building. If I didn't know any better, I'd say he developed an edifice complex".

== See also ==
- Marcos mansions
- Ferdinand Marcos's cult of personality
