= Cultural Center of the Philippines Complex =

Arts center in Metro Manila, Philippines

Cultural Center of the Philippines
- Sentrong Pangkultura ng Pilipinas (Filipino)
- CCP Complex

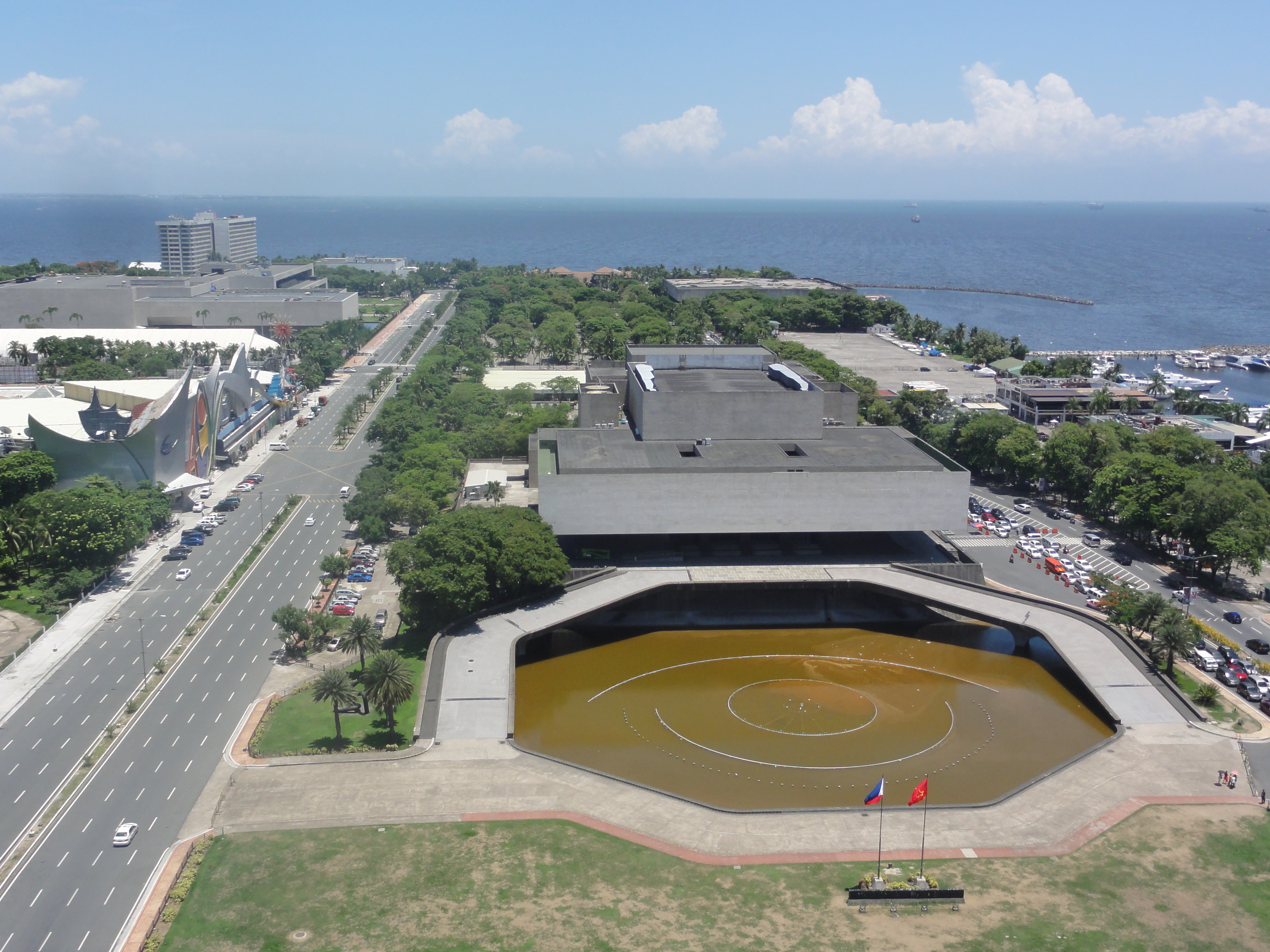
- An aerial view of the Tanghalang Pambansa and the northern (Manila) section of the CCP Complex

- Location in Manila Location in Metro Manila Location in Luzon Location in the Philippines
- Address: Roxas Boulevard
- Location: Pasay City and Manila, Metro Manila, Philippines (Note: The Cultural Center of the Philippines Complex lies between Pasay and the City of Manila. The boundary between the cities is Vicente Sotto Street. Landmarks in CCP Complex that lies within the City of Manila include the Tanghalang Pambansa (National Theater), the Tanghalang Francisco Balagtas (Folks Art Theater), and the Coconut Palace which is owned by the Government Service Insurance System.)
- Coordinates: 14°33′18″N 120°59′00″E
- Owner: Cultural Center of the Philippines
- Operator: Michelle Nikki M. Junia, President
- Type: Performing arts center

Construction
- Built: September 1966
- Opened: September 8, 1969
- Architect: Leandro V. Locsin

Tenants
- Ballet Philippines; Bayanihan Philippine National Folk Dance Company; National Music Competitions for Young Artists Foundation; Philippine Ballet Theatre; Philippine Madrigal Singers; Philippine Philharmonic Orchestra; Ramon Obusan Folkloric Group; Tanghalang Pilipino; UST Symphony Orchestra

Website
- www.culturalcenter.gov.ph

The Cultural Center of the Philippines Complex, also known as the CCP Complex, is an 88-hectare (220-acre) art district managed by the Cultural Center of the Philippines (CCP) located along Roxas Boulevard in Metro Manila, Philippines. It is a mixed-use cultural and tourism hub overlooking Manila Bay in south-central Manila, most of which fall under the jurisdiction of the city of Pasay.

Development of the complex was stalled until 2000, when the Supreme Court of the Philippines ruled with finality the CCP's ownership of some 35 hectares (86 acres) of prime real estate in the complex. The property is 62.4 hectares (154 acres) of land, with the rest occupied by the Government Service Insurance System, the Bangko Sentral ng Pilipinas, and the Privatization and Management Office. It is part of Bay City (formerly Boulevard 2000) that spans 1,500 hectares (3,700 acres) of reclaimed land along Manila Bay which is occupied by the SM Central Business Park, Philippine National Bank's Financial Center Area, Aseana City, and PAGCOR's Entertainment City, among others.

== Description ==
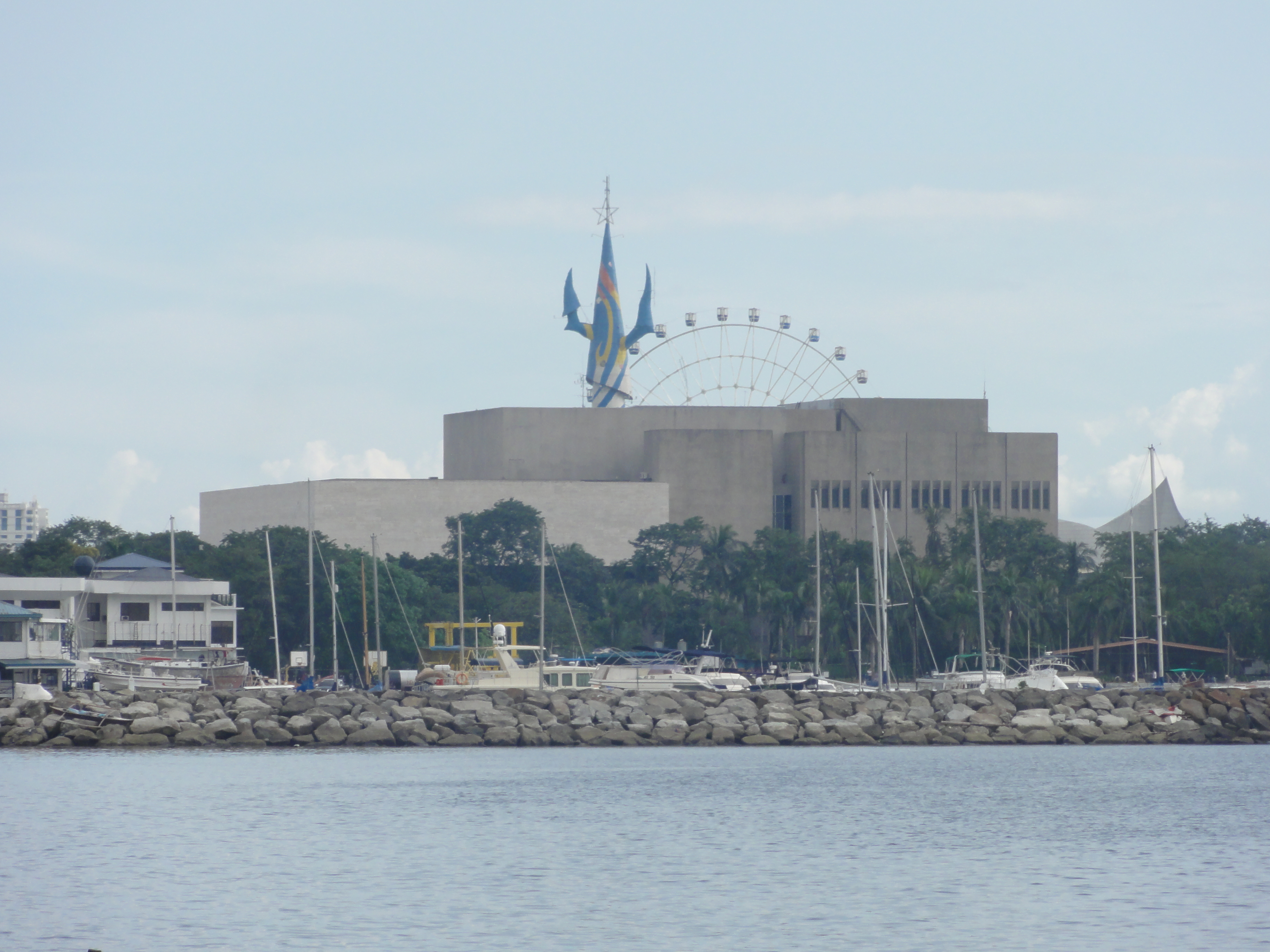
The CCP Complex from the Roxas Boulevard

The complex is bounded by Manila Bay to the north and west, the Philippine Navy headquarters to the northeast, Roxas Boulevard to the east, and Jose W. Diokno Boulevard to the south. It is divided into two zones: the Art Zone, and the Commercial and Entertainment Zone. It features several brutalist structures designed in the 1960s and 1970s by Leandro Locsin, such as the Tanghalang Pambansa, the Philippine International Convention Center, and the Sofitel Philippine Plaza Manila. Other landmarks in the complex include the Coconut Palace, the Manila Film Center, Star City amusement park, and Harbour Square.

== Buildings ==
=== Tanghalang Pambansa ===
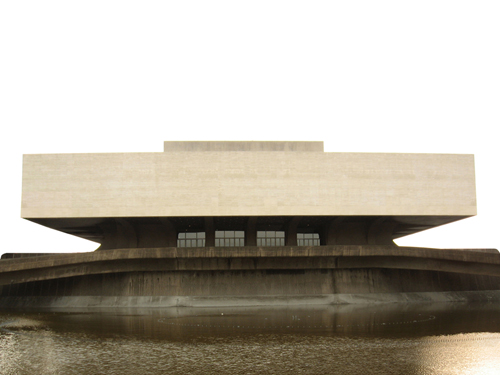
Façade of the Tanghalang Pambansa

The Tanghalang Pambansa (English: National Theater) is the flagship venue and principal offices of the Cultural Center of the Philippines. Formally called the Theater of Performing Arts, it houses three major performing arts venues; one theater for film screenings; galleries; a museum; and the center's library and archives.

- Tanghalang Nicanor Abelardo (Main Theater)
- Tanghalang Aurelio Tolentino (Little Theater)
- Tanghalang Huseng Batute (Studio Theater)

Designed by National Artist for Architecture Leandro Locsin, its design was based and expanded upon the unconstructed Philippine-American Friendship Center. The Tanghalan is a primary example of the architect's signature style known as the floating volume, a trait which can be seen in structures indigenous to the Philippines such as the nipa hut. Being a work of a National Artist, the brutalist structure is qualified to be an important cultural landmark as stipulated in Republic Act No. 10066.

=== Tanghalang Francisco Balagtas ===
Tanghalang Francisco Balagtas

The Tanghalang Francisco Balagtas, more commonly known by its original name of Folk Arts Theater, is a covered proscenium amphitheater where popular concerts are staged. It has a seating capacity of 8,458 in 10 sections. The building was originally built to seat an audience of 10,000 and was commissioned by then First Lady Imelda Marcos in 1974 for the Miss Universe Pageant, which was to be held in Manila. The theater was built in record time of seventy-seven days in time for the pageant and was designed by Leandro V. Locsin.

It was host to many popular musical acts of the 1980s onwards, including Puerto Rican group Menudo, British pop group 5ive, Janet Jackson, Gary Valenciano and Jay R. The Folk Arts Theater is also used by different religious groups. Day by Day Christian Ministries, a large international religious organization, has leased the area from 2005 to 2020. They have dedicated the Theatre as Bulwagan ng Panginoón (English: Hall of the Lord). The building is expected to be torn down in the future, subject to the development of the complex.

=== Other buildings ===
The CCP Complex is also home to the following:

- Philippine International Convention Center (owned by the BSP)
- Manila Film Center (CCP)
- Coconut Palace (GSIS)
- Sofitel Philippine Plaza Manila (GSIS; now closed)
- MBC Building (MBC Media Group)
- Design Center of the Philippines (DTI)
- Tanghalang Ignacio B. Gimenez (Black Box Theater)
Philippine International Convention Center

The Manila Film Center in the CCP Complex

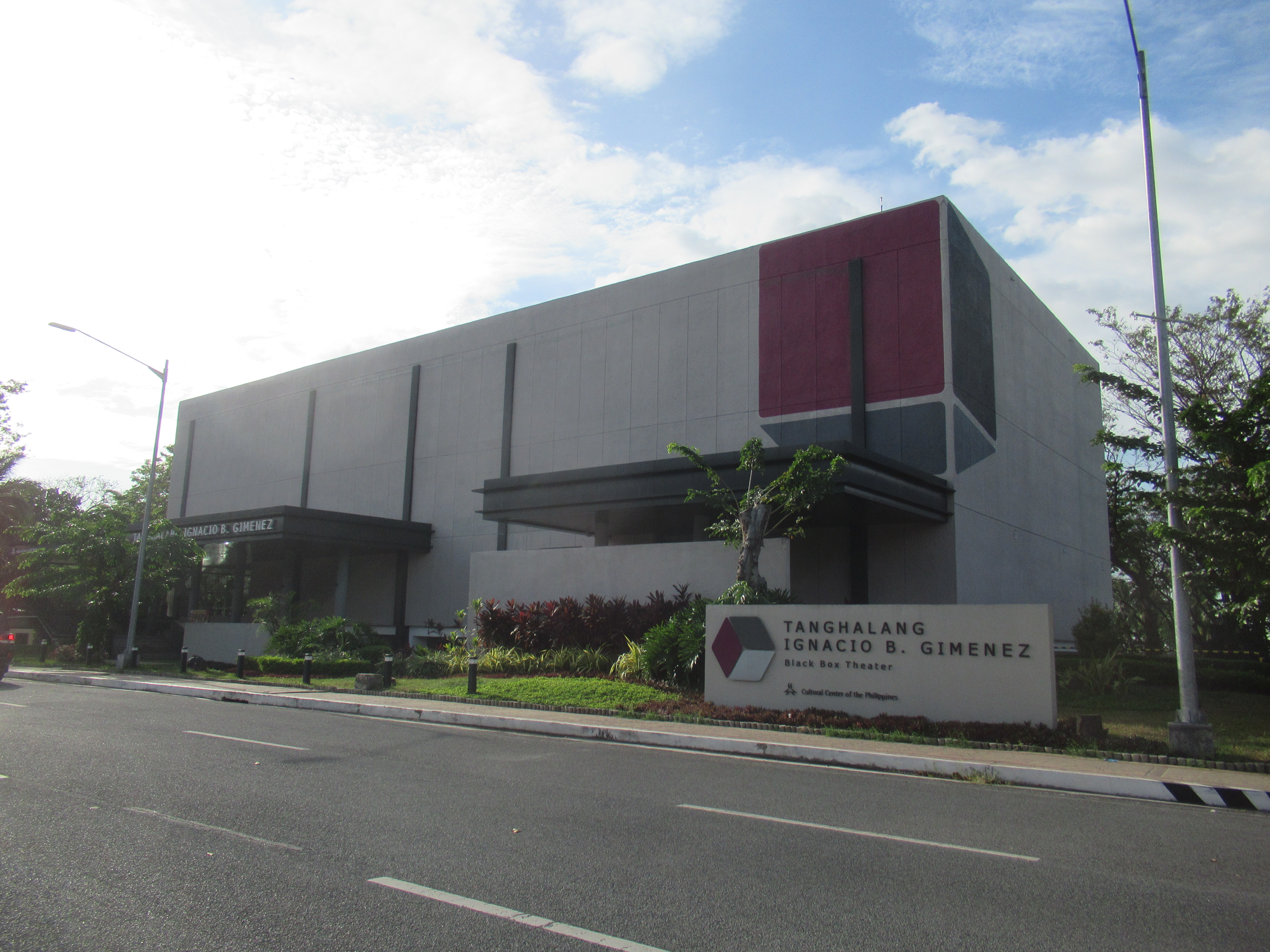
Tanghalang Ignacio B. Gimenez

== History ==
The Cultural Center of the Philippines was conceived in 1966 when President Ferdinand Marcos issued Executive Order No. 60, establishing its board and arranging for his wife, First Lady Imelda Marcos to become chair of its board of directors.

The Philippine-American Culture Foundation provided a 90,000 peso grant for its construction, and additional funds were taken from the Cultural Development Fund and the Special Fund for Education. It soon became the premier symbol of what would be called Imelda's "edifice complex".

== Expansion ==
A comprehensive master plan for the development of the complex was unveiled in 2003. The plan would divide the CCP Complex into six clusters, each of which will be anchored by a major building. First, the Promenade, which will tentatively be named after Lucresia Reyes-Urtula, will include retail and other mixed-use facilities, as well as dock facilities. The second cluster will be the Arts Sanctuary, which will serve as the complex's cultural core. To be anchored by the Tanghalang Pambansa, it will contain a new performing arts theater, the artists' center, a bandstand, the CCP's Production Design Center, and other open areas.

The third cluster, the Green Zone will contain a mix of museums and parks with commercial and office spaces. Fourth, the Creative Hub cluster, will contain spaces for creative industries. Fifth, the Arts Living Room, is envisioned to be a high-density, high-rise area that will house condominiums and similar residential projects. The final cluster, the Breezeway, will be located by low-rise, low-density commercial structures with seafront entertainment facilities. Covered walkways, plazas, and bicycle lanes are planned to connect the various buildings and clusters to ensure a pedestrian-centered design.

The master plan is envisioned to be completed in four phases, from 2004 to 2014; ₱5 billion will be needed for the plan's first five years, and another ₱8 billion for the plan's latter half.

A design contest was held in 2005 to design the first two clusters. Three firms won for their concepts; Syndicated Architects, Manalang-Tayag-Ilano Architects, and JPA Buensalido Design. The concepts of each winner will then be presented to prospective investors and stakeholders for approval.

Syndicated Architects

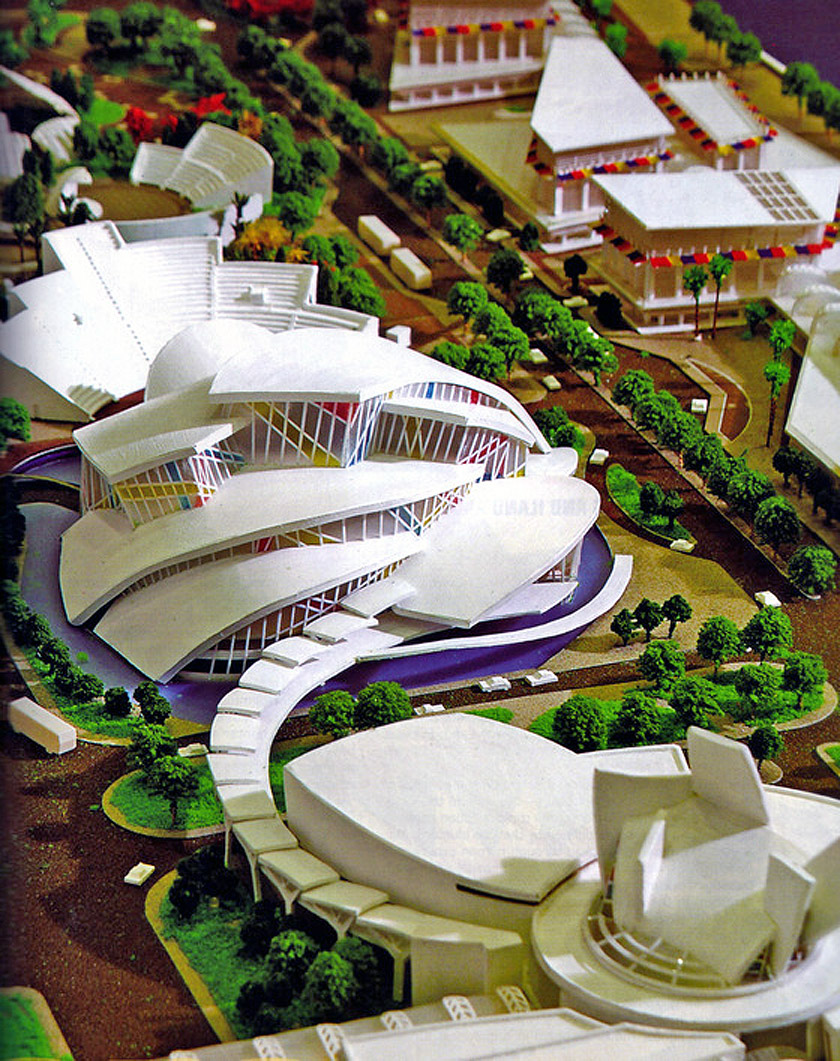
JP Buensalido Designs

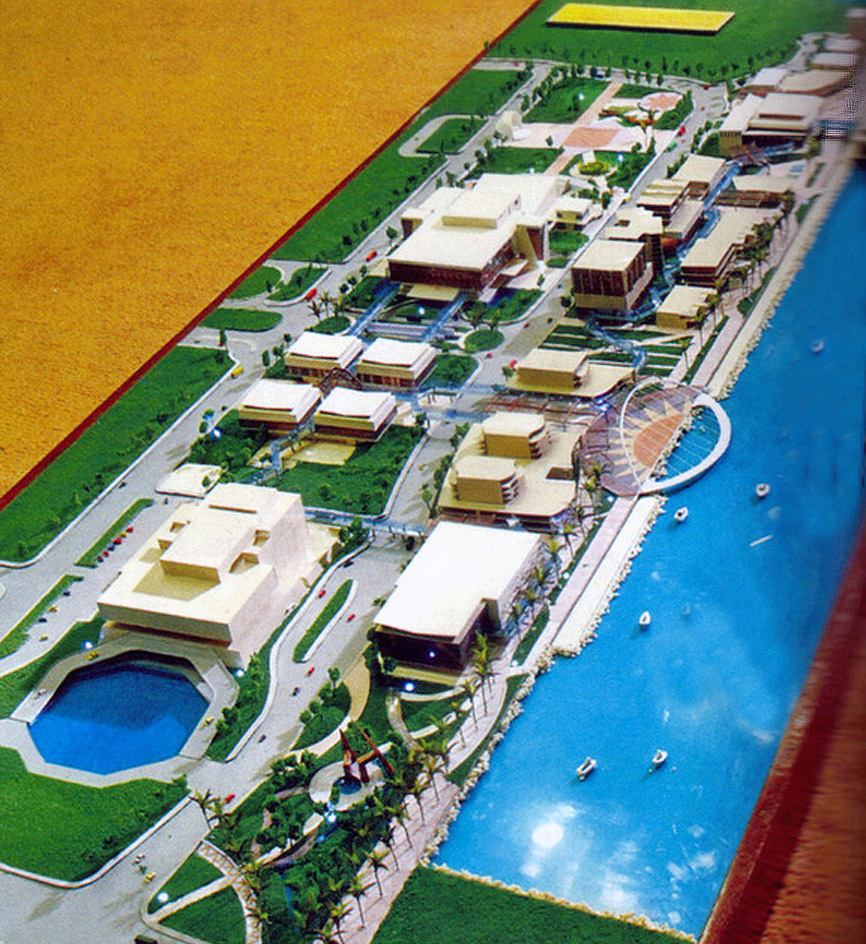
Manalang-Tayag-Ilano Architects

In 2011, Leandro V. Locsin Partners, Architects won the design contest for the Artists' Center and Performing Arts Theater, the two buildings that will anchor the Promenade and Arts Sanctuary Clusters respectively. The proposed Artists' Center will house offices and rehearsal spaces for the CCP's resident companies, a black box theater and rooms for educational programs. The winning design is akin to a traditional Badjao village or a mangrove forest, with rooms and pavilions supported by slim pilotis. The proposed Performing Arts Theater will contain a 1,000 seat conventional proscenium theater and a black box that will seat 300-500 people. In contrast with the Tanghalang Pambansa's massive travertine block, the façade of the new theater will be dominated by its main seating bowl clad in reflective material, evoking a wave rising out of the sea.

On January 19, 2016, construction of a new black box theater started. The facility is being built as a stand-alone structure which will be integrated into the proposed Performing Arts Theater. Estimated to cost ₱50 million, the new theater will be three to four times bigger than the Tanghalang Huseng Batute, the current black box facility of the CCP. It will seat 300 people, with Nagata Acoustics performing the acoustical design.
