= Manila Film Center =

Cultural archive and theater in Metro Manila, Philippines

- The front exterior of the building, taken in December 2020

General information
- Architectural style: Brutalism
- Location: Pasay, Philippines
- Coordinates: 14.550556°N 120.981944°E
- Construction started: 1981
- Completed: 1982
- Closed: 1990
- Cost: US$25 million
- Owner: Government of the Philippines
- Operator: Cultural Center of the Philippines

Design and construction
- Architect: Froilan Hong

The Manila Film Center is a building located at the southwest end of the Cultural Center of the Philippines Complex in Pasay, Philippines. The structure was designed by architect Froilan Hong. Its edifice is supported on more than nine hundred piles which reach into the bedrock about 120 feet below ground level.

The Manila Film Center served as the main theater for the First Manila International Film Festival (MIFF) January 18–29, 1982. The building has also been the subject of controversy due to a fatal accident that happened on November 17, 1981 where at least 169 workers fell and were buried under quick-drying cement.

== History ==
=== Conceptualization ===
Prior to the Manila Film Center, the Philippines did not have an official national film archive which is why in January 1981, then first lady Imelda Marcos spearheaded the building of the first Manila Center. Under the supervision of Betty Benitez, the spouse of then Deputy MHS Minister Jose Conrado Benitez, they organized a group to pursue the project. Ramon M. Ignacio, Senior Technology Officer at the Technology Resource Center, conceptualized the project and its various components. He likewise prepared the feasibility study.

Among the Film Center's project components were: the 360-degree theater to show past and present historical and tourism scenes for future generations, the Film Financing/Loan Program to address funding of meritable films, the Filipino Film Archiving using Digital Storage (though was little known during those times), Film Database/Information system, Film Making and Blow Up Laboratory, Viewing rooms for the Board of Censors and other minor sub-components. Despite the futuristic and concept creativity of Ignacio, only two of the project components were actually done. UNESCO's assistance was invaluable in the design of the archives, so they were asked to be consultants of the project.

Several ocular visits were done by Unesco in 1981 where they were responsible for major consultations needed in the structure's erection. The building was then designed to have two components which were the auditoria and archives. According to Hong, the foundation was set on reclaimed land near Manila Bay. Since the deadline of the structure was tight, it required 4,000 workers, working in 3 shifts across 24 hours. One thousand workers constructed the lobby in 72 hours, a job which would normally entail six weeks of labor. The Film Center opened in 1982 costing an estimate of US$25 million.

The building is identified with the Marcoses' "edifice complex," a term defined by architect Gerard Lico as "an obsession and compulsion to build edifices as a hallmark of greatness."

=== 1981 construction deaths ===
An accident occurred around 3:00 a.m. on November 17, 1981, during the construction of the Manila Film Center. The scaffolding collapsed, and at least 169 workers fell and were buried under quick-drying wet cement. A blanket of security was immediately imposed by the Marcos dictatorship. Neither rescuers nor ambulances were permitted on the site until an official statement had been prepared. The rescuers were eventually permitted to go inside the accident site nine hours after the collapse.

According to former CCP president Baltazar N. Endriga, architect Froilan Hong said that only seven died in the accident and that all of them "were retrieved and given the proper rites befitting the dead."

The Manila Film Center at dusk, 2009

=== Aftermath ===
After the tragedy, Prime Minister Cesar Virata disapproved a US$5 million subsidy which was originally intended for the film festival. Lacking in funding, Imelda Marcos created a contingency plan that would generate enough funds to cover the festival.

Design and architecture writer Deyan Sudjic credits the Manila Film Center accident as one of the events which heralded the downfall of the Marcos dictatorship half a decade later, saying:

The beginning of the end of the Marcos period was marked by the collapse of the scaffolding on the Manila Film Center, one of Imelda Marcos’s pet projects, as it was being rushed for completion. Several construction workers were killed, crushed by falling steel. The very buildings being presented as the icons of a bold new republic seemed to embody the corruption and incompetence of the regime.

=== The First Manila Film Festival ===
Amidst everything, the first Manila International film festival pushed through from the January 18 to 29, 1982. A total of 17 movies competed in the festival namely 36 Chowringhee Lane (India), Body Heat (USA), Gallipoli (Australia), Growing up (Line Iida) (Norway), Harry Tracy-Desperado (Canada), La Femme d'à côté (France), Lola (Germany), Los Viernes de la Eternidad (Argentina), Majstori, Majstori! (Yugoslavia), No Charges Filed (Egypt), Smash Palace (New Zealand), Take It All (Jetz Und Alles) (West Germany), The Beloved Woman of Mechanic Gavrilov (USSR), The French Lieutenant's Woman (Great Britain), There Was A War When I Was A Child (Japan), Vabank (Poland) and Wasted Lives (Hungary).

India's entry, 36 Chowringhee Lane, claimed best picture. Best actress and best actor were brought home by Lyudmila Gurchenko and Bruno Lawrence respectively. Yugoslav film director Goran Marković won best director.

=== Post 1990s ===
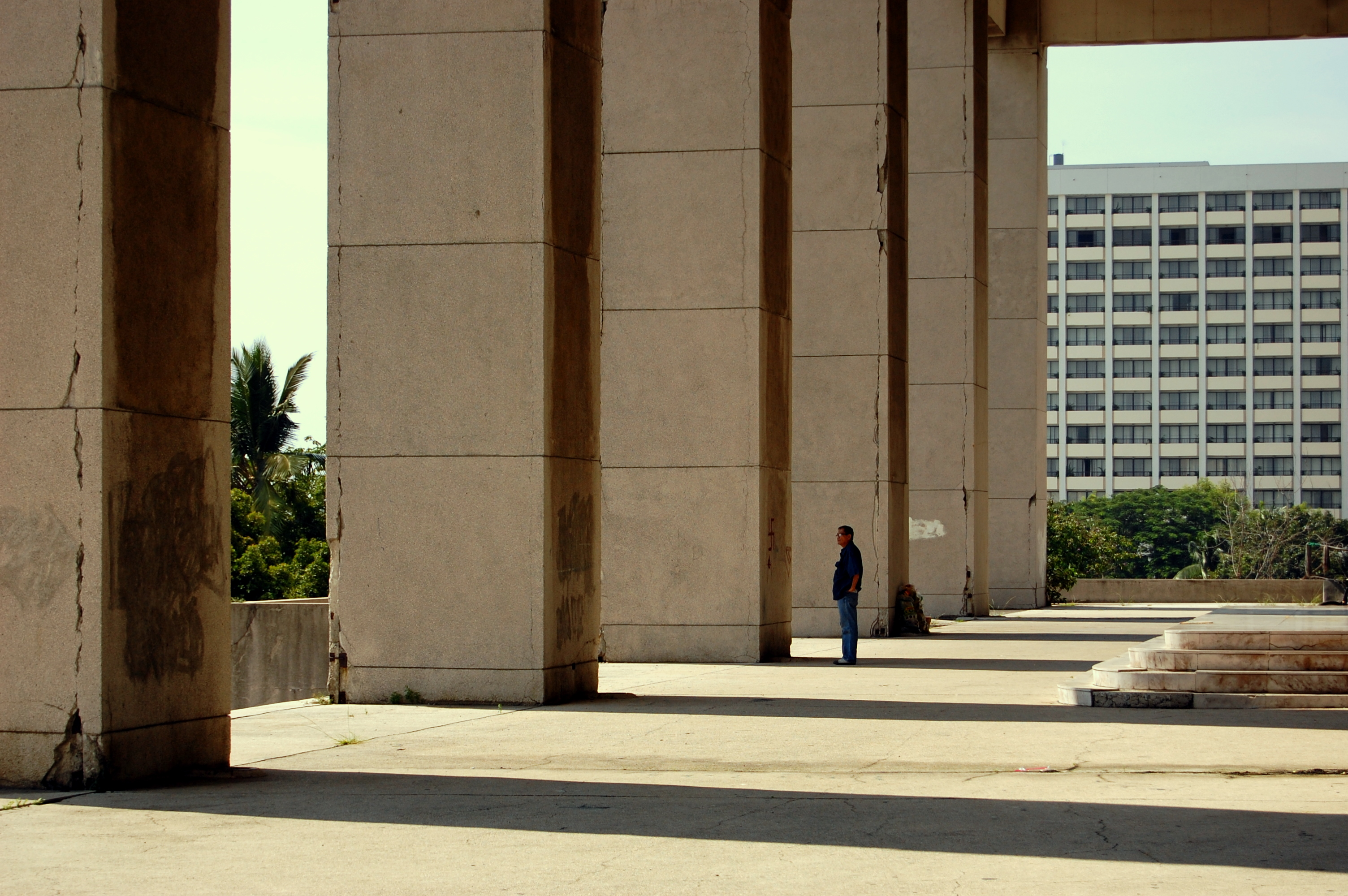
Sunset at Manila Film Center

After the 1990 earthquake that hit Manila and the rest of Luzon, the center was abandoned, following reports of structural damage to load-bearing beams on the west side of the building. In 2001, then CCP President Armita Rufino announced a full rehabilitation program for the deteriorating Film Center. The Department of Public Works and Highways and the film center's architect, Hong, were part of the strategic planning session on structure's renovation. The rehabilitation cost estimate in 2001 was approximately 300 million pesos, while the cost of erecting a brand new building was estimated at 1.8 billion pesos.

After its renovation was completed, CPACEAI leased the theater from the Philippine government in October 2001. On December 10, 2001, the Amazing Show, produced by Amazing Philippines Theatre, opened to the public. All of the performers in the show were transgender. Their lease expired in 2009, which forced the show to move to another facility.

In 2009, the Philippine Senate considered moving from the Government Service Insurance System building to the Film Center located only less than a kilometer away. The proposed tenancy would cost significantly less than the current lease at the GSIS compound, which the senate had been renting from the GSIS at an annual cost of 100 million pesos since 1997. On February 19, 2013, a three-hour fire damaged the film center. No casualties were reported, but structural damage was estimated at 1.2 million pesos. A year later, in February 2014, the decision of the Senate to transfer to the Film Center was put on hold by then Senate President Franklin Drilon.

== In popular culture ==
The Manila Film Center is said by believers to be haunted due to the 1981 accident that took place during the construction of the structure. The hauntings in relation to the tragedy were discussed in a 2006 episode of GMA Network's i-Witness and a 1991 Halloween Special of ABS-CBN's Magandang Gabi... Bayan.

=== Film and literature ===
In the 2010 Filipino film The Red Shoes, part of the plot hinges on the supposed death of the father of the main character, Lucas, played by Marvin Agustin, who was supposed to have been among the 169 workers buried alive in the accident at the construction of the Manila Film Center. The film also featured a spiritualist, Madame Vange, played by Tessie Tomas who performs in the Manila Film Center as an impersonator of First Lady Imelda Marcos.

In the graphic novel, The Filipino Heroes League, the building was transformed from the Film Center to the FHL's headquarters. The building was once respectable and housed the old members of the League. After a while, their leader, Supremo, went into a coma and soon after, most of the superheroes who were once part of the League went abroad. Less than a handful of superheroes remain and continue to conduct their superhero work in a shack in front of the now run down Film Center.

The construction of the cultural center and subsequent construction accident are addressed in the Marcos-focused musical Here Lies Love, where the show's version of Ninoy Aquino invokes it in the song "Fabulous One" while criticizing the regime. The collapse's reference in the musical is somewhat erroneous, as the scene in question takes place in 1969, years before the incident's actual occurrence in 1981 while Aquino was in exile in America.

==== Tragic Theater ====
Filipino author Gilbert M. Coronel released a novel entitled Tragic Theater in 2009. The book first tells of the 1981 incident. It heads to 1999 when the government's plan to build an IMAX theater in the structure is handed to Department of Tourism coordinator named Anne Marie "Annie" Francisco. The first priority is to rid the place of the trapped souls so she seeks the help of a priest Fr. Marcelo, known for his radical cleansing methods and a group of spirit communicators. Anne and Fr. Marcelo lead the group in their mission only to discover too late that an evil presence took sanctuary inside the building long ago and fed on the anger and misery of the victims' souls. A bishop later helps with the task when Anne is possessed by the evil entity.

A film adaption of Coronel's novel premiered on January 8, 2015. It stars Andi Eigenmann as DOT coordinator Anne, John Estrada as priest Fr. Marcelo, and Christopher de Leon as the bishop. The film however changes a few names; like the exorcism priest Fr. Marcelo is renamed Fr. Nilo. It is noted, however, that the actual Manila Film Center was not used for filming. The AFP Museum and Multi-Purpose Theater in Camp Aguinaldo doubled or filled in for the Manila Film Center's main theater and interiors.

Both the novel and movie are loosely based on and inspired by the 1981 incident and the late 1990s Spirit Questors' visit to the place.

== Exemption from censorship ==
In October 1985, a law was passed to create a board of review for motion pictures and television in the Philippines. This entity was later known as the Movie and Television Review and Classification Board (MTRCB).

The law also allowed an exclusive exemption of films shown at the Manila Film Center from censorship. The building was finished in 1982.

== See also ==
- Cinemalaya Philippine Independent Film Festival
- Cultural Center of the Philippines
- Manila Metropolitan Theater
- Philippine International Convention Center
