= Coconut Palace =

Government building in Manila, Philippines

- Tahanang Pilipino
- The Coconut Palace

General information
- Architectural style: Filipino vernacular architecture
- Location: F. Ma. Guerrero Street, Pasay, Philippines
- Coordinates: 14°33′19″N 120°58′48″E
- Completed: 1978
- Renovated: 2010

Design and construction
- Architect: Francisco Mañosa

Coconut Palace, also known as Tahanang Pilipino (lit. 'Filipino Home'), is a government building located in the Cultural Center of the Philippines Complex in Pasay, Philippines. It was the official residence and the principal workplace of the Vice President of the Philippines during the term of Jejomar Binay.

== History ==
It was commissioned in 1978 by First Lady Imelda Marcos as a government guest house and offered to Pope John Paul II during his visit to the country in 1981, but the Pope refused to stay there because it was too opulent given the level of poverty in the Philippines.

Coconut Palace cost ₱37 million to build (Note: Presumably, in 2011 inflation-adjusted pesos though the article does not clarify.) and was partly financed by the Coconut Levy Fund, which was set up to be used for the welfare of coconut farmers. Its construction is sometimes associated with Mrs. Marcos' “edifice complex”, a term popularized by architectural historian Gerard Lico as the "obsession and compulsion to build edifices as a hallmark of greatness or as a signifier of national prosperity." It is presently owned by the Government Service Insurance System (GSIS).

Coconut Palace underwent major renovations as it was being eyed as the official office and residence of the Vice-President. On February 11, 2011, it was officially turned over to Vice-President Jejomar Binay upon the signing of a lease contract with the Government Service Insurance System (GSIS), with a monthly rental fee of ₱400,000.

== Design ==
Coconut Palace is made of several types of Philippine hardwood, coconut shells, and a specially engineered coconut lumber apparently known as Imelda Madera. Each of the suites on the second floor is named after a specific region of the Philippines and displays some of the handicrafts these regions produce. The palace is located on F. Ma. Guerrero Street at the Cultural Center of the Philippines Complex between the former sites of the Folk Arts Theatre and the Sofitel Philippine Plaza Hotel. Except for its time as the official residence and workplace of the Vice-President, the palace has been a popular wedding venue.

The palace is shaped like an octagon (mimicking a fresh coconut cut before being served), while the roof is shaped like a traditional Filipino salakót or hat. Some of its highlights are the 101 coconut-shell chandelier, and the dining table with 40,000 tiny inlaid coconut shell pieces. Highlighted as one of the Cultural Center of the Philippines' most striking structures for its architecture and interiors, the palace celebrates the coconut as the ultimate "tree of life". From the coconut's roots to its trunk, bark, fruit, flower and shell, the palace's design, form and ornamentation echo these elements.

== Function ==
Coconut Palace has been a guesthouse for many prominent visitors in the Marcos era, including the late Libyan leader Muammar al-Gaddafi, Brooke Shields and George Hamilton.

Coconut Palace has been featured in various television programs. On the fifth season of the reality series The Amazing Race, the Coconut Palace served as the "Pit Stop" when the competing teams went to Manila. The contestants were welcomed by Luli Arroyo, daughter of then-president Gloria Macapagal Arroyo. The palace was also a primary filming location for the ABS-CBN television series Princess Sarah as the all-girls boarding school of Miss Minchin, and Tanging Yaman, standing in for Malacañang Palace as the residence of the First Family.

On November 15, 2026, President Bongbong Marcos hosted his fellow ASEAN leaders at the palace for the retreat session of the 49th ASEAN Summit.

== Guest rooms ==
The palace has seven guest rooms named after Philippine provinces:

- Zamboanga Room, the first room and said to be George Hamilton's favorite
- Pampanga Room, showcases Kampampangan art with statues made of lahar from Mount Pinatubo
- Marawi Room, showcases Muslim Mindanao
- Bicol Room, Imelda Marcos' favorite room
- Mountain Province Room, containing many Cordillera tribal artifacts
- Iloilo Room
- Pangasinan Room, Ferdinand Marcos' room

== See also ==
- Malacañan Palace, Philippine Presidential Palace
