= Ramon Obusan Folkloric Group =

Philippine folk dance troupe

The Ramon Obusan Folkloric Group (ROFG) was founded in 1972, and started out as a fledgling folk dance company composed of around 30 performers. Leaning on the vast amount of data and artifacts that he has accumulated while doing research over the years, Ramon Obusan thought of starting a dance company that would mirror the traditional culture of the Philippines through dance and music.

For over thirty years, the ROFG has created a niche in the world of dance as forerunner of Philippine dance performed faithful to its original form. The ROFG has been one of the Cultural Center of the Philippines' leading resident companies since 1986 and has presented over a thousand performances in the Philippines and abroad.

ROFG has received international recognition. For the past two decades, it has documented and performed the rituals of more than 50 ethnolinguistic groups from within the country. With more than twenty full-length Filipino dance works – among which are suites from the Cordillera, Bagobo, T'boli, Tausug, Maranao, the Aetas and the Talaandig among others – the ROFG has served to preserve the dance heritage of the Philippines.

In 2026, the group's audiovisual archive was included in the UNESCO Memory of the World Regional Register.
