= Philippine Heart Center =

Government hospital in Quezon City, Philippines

- Department of Health

- The hospital in 2021

- Location within Metro Manila Location within Luzon Location within Philippines

Geography
- Location: East Avenue, Quezon City, Metro Manila, Philippines
- Coordinates: 14°38′38″N 121°02′54″E

Services
- Emergency department: Yes
- Beds: 800

History
- Founded: February 14, 1975; 51 years ago

Links
- Website: www.phc.gov.ph
- Lists: Hospitals in the Philippines

The Philippine Heart Center (Filipino: Ospital ng Pilipinas sa Puso) is a hospital in Central, Quezon City, Philippines, specializing in the treatment of heart ailments. It was established on February 14, 1975.

== Background ==
The Philippine Heart Center is a hospital specializing in the treatment of heart ailments. It has rooms for paying patients and charity patients and admits more than 14,000 patients every year, including 3,300 that undergo heart surgery. It holds regular training programs for medical professionals. It as one of the busiest congenital heart surgery centers in Asia, according to its website. It is currently headed by cardiothoracic surgeon Avenilo Aventura Jr.

== History ==
The Philippine Heart Center was established through Presidential Decree No. 673 issued by president Ferdinand E. Marcos on February 14, 1975. The building is identified with what is referred to as the Marcoses' "edifice complex," defined by architect Gerard Lico as "an obsession and compulsion to build edifices as a hallmark of greatness." The hospital was built using 50% of the national health budget, according to Senator Jose W. Diokno, "while around the country, Filipinos were dying of curable illnesses like TB [tuberculosis], whooping cough, and dysentery."

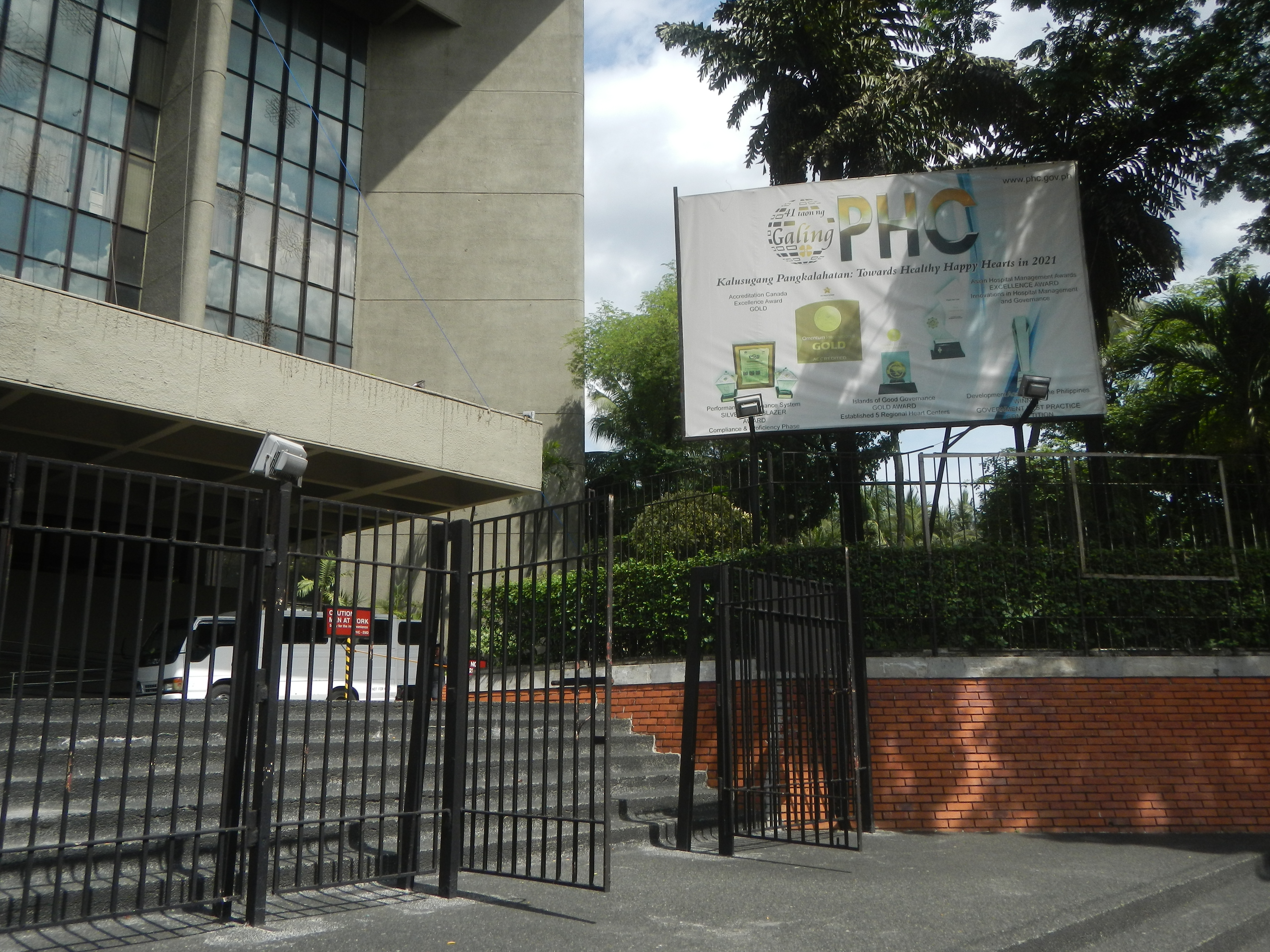
Gate

Its original name was the Philippine Heart Center for Asia and was changed to its current form in 1975. The first patient to be admitted to the PHC was Imelda Francisco, on April 14, 1975.

Cardiovascular specialists including Christiaan Barnard, Denton Cooley, Donald Effler, and Charles Bailey practised there. The first Director of the PHC was Avenilo P. Aventura (1974–1986), a cardiovascular surgeon who performed many pioneering operations in the Philippines including the first successful renal transplantation in 1970, the first CABG in 1972, and developed and implanted the first ASEAN bioprosthesis, the PHCA porcine valve.

In 2014, the Philippine Heart Center was given a Qmentum International Gold Accreditation for August 2014 – 2017 by Accreditation Canada International for "excellence in hospital practices and safety.

On June 13, 2024, Marcos, Jr. appointed Avenilo "Jun" Aventura Jr. as the PHC's executive director.

== Architecture and design ==
The hospital building was designed by Filipino architect Jorge Ramos in what has been described as a Brutalist style. It was built in 1975 with a reported cost of almost US$50 million. It was co-founded by Ludgerio Torres.
