= Cultural Center of the Philippines =

Philippines state corporation

Cultural Center of the Philippines Sentrong Pangkultura ng Pilipinas
- The logo, derived from the Baybayin character Ka and styled based on a Katipunan design, represents Katotohanan, Kagandahan at Kabutihan (Truth, Beauty and Goodness).

- CCP wordmark
- Formation: September 1966
- Type: Government-owned and controlled corporation
- Location: Pasay, Philippines
- Products: Publications in print and multimedia
- Services: Venue rentals, theatre operations, theater rentals and consultancy, research, building tours, information services, art gallery
- Owner: Government of the Philippines
- Key people: Jaime C. Laya, Chairperson; Kaye C. Tinga, President and CEO; Dennis Marasigan, Artistic director
- Parent organization: Office of the President of the Philippines
- Employees: about 300 (2011)
- Website: www.culturalcenter.gov.ph

The Cultural Center of the Philippines (CCP; Filipino: Sentrong Pangkultura ng Pilipinas) is a government-owned and controlled corporation (GOCC) established to preserve, develop, and promote the arts and culture of the Philippines. The CCP was established through Executive Order No. 30, s. 1966, issued by President Ferdinand Marcos. Although an independent institution of the Philippine government, it receives an annual subsidy and is placed under the National Commission for Culture and the Arts (NCCA) for purposes of policy coordination. The CCP is governed by an 11-member board of trustees, currently headed by Jaime C. Laya. Its president is Kaye C. Tinga.

The CCP provides performance and exhibition venues for various local and international productions at the 62-hectare (150-acre) Cultural Center of the Philippines Complex, located in the cities of Pasay and Manila. Its artistic programs include performances, festivals, exhibitions, cultural research, outreach activities, preservation, and the publication of materials on Philippine art and culture. Its headquarters is at the Tanghalang Pambansa (English: National Theater), a structure designed by National Artist for Architecture Leandro Locsin. Locsin later designed many of the other buildings in the CCP Complex.

== History ==
On the first year, I'll cover the soil. On the second year, I'll drive the pile. On the third year, the building will rise. On the fourth year, the curtain will rise

— Imelda Marcos to John Rockefeller III in 1966.

You do not develop culture by putting up a 50-million building on the bay...

— Ninoy Aquino

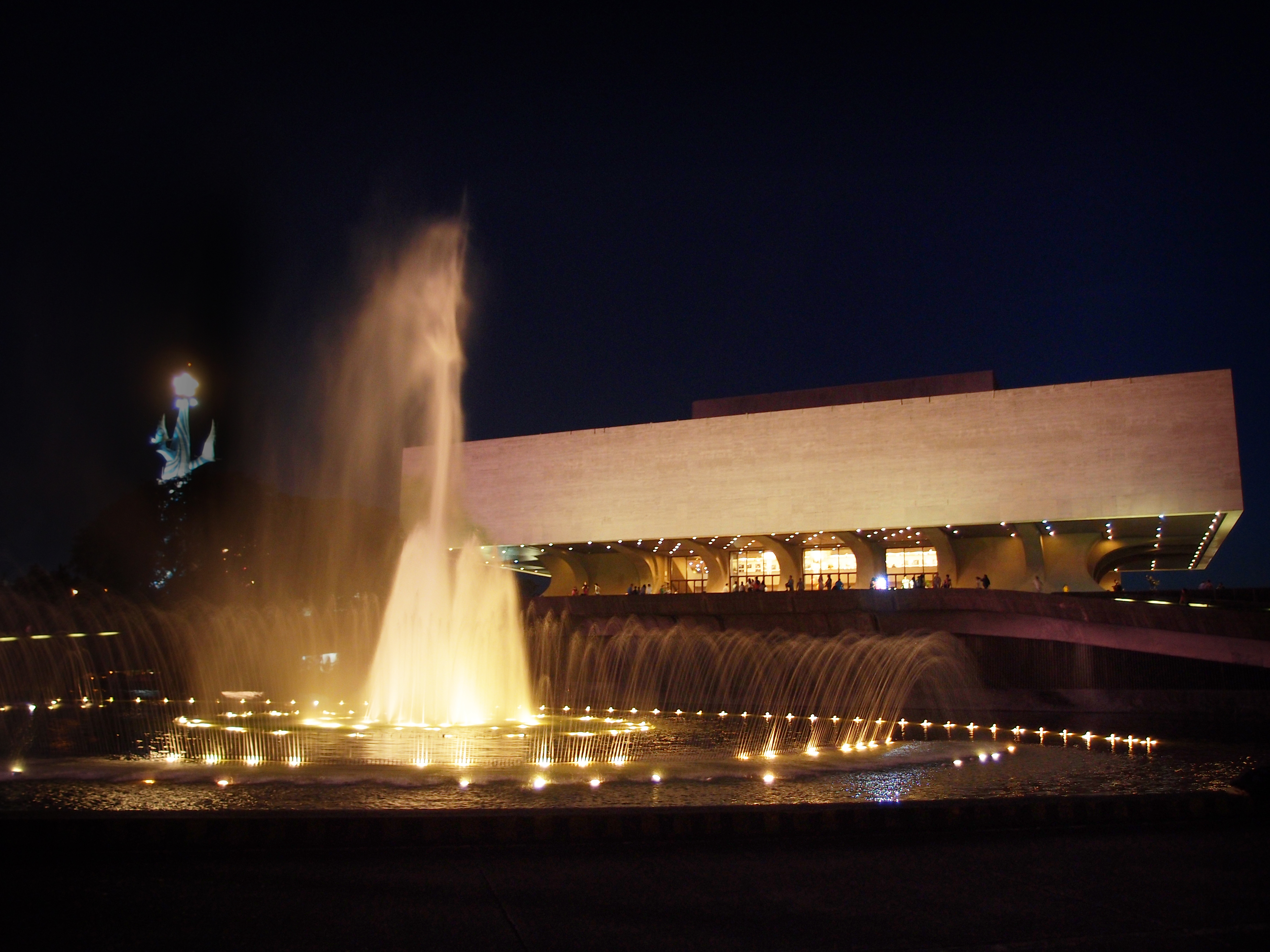
The Tanghalang Pambansa in 2012.

Before the turn of the 20th century, artistic performances were primarily held in plazas and other public places around the country. In Manila, the Manila Grand Opera House, constructed in the mid-19th Century, served as the primary venue for many stage plays, operas and zarzuelas and other events of national significance. Conditions improve with the construction of the Metropolitan Theater in 1931 and smaller but adequately equipped auditoriums in institutions like Meralco, Philam Life, Insular Life, Ateneo de Manila University and Far Eastern University. In 1961, the Philippine-American Cultural Foundation started to raise funds for a new theater. The structure, designed by Leandro Locsin, was to be built on a 10-hectare (25-acre) lot in Quezon City. In the meantime in 1965, Imelda Marcos at a proclamation rally in Cebu for her husband's bid for the Presidency, expressed her desire to build a national theater. Marcos would win his election bid and work on the theater started with the issuance of Presidential Proclamation No. 20 on March 12, 1966. Imelda, now the First Lady, persuaded the Philippine-American Cultural Foundation to relocate and expand plans for the still-born theater to a new reclaimed location along Roxas Boulevard in Manila. To formalize the project, President Marcos issued Executive Order No. 30, establishing the Cultural Center of the Philippines and appointing its board of directors. The board would elect Imelda as chairperson, giving her the legal mandate to negotiate and manage funds for the center.

Prior to her husband's inaugural, Marcos already started fundraising for the Cultural Center; an initial half-a-million Pesos was made from the proceeds of the premiere of Flower Drum Song at the Philam Life Theater, and another ninety-thousand peso turned over from the Filipino arm of the Philippine-American Cultural Foundation. This was, however, insufficient to cover the projected cost of PH₱15 million needed to construct the theater. Much of the theater's funding came from a war damage fund for education authorized by the US Congress during President Marcos's state visit to the United States. In the end, the theater would receive US$3.5 million from the fund. To make up for the rest of the construction costs, Imelda approached prominent families and businesses to donate to her cause. Carpets, draperies, marble, artwork to decorate the interior of the theater, and even cement were all donated. Despite the success of the First Lady's fundraising, the project's cost ballooned to almost ₱50 million, or 35 million over the projected budget by 1969. Imelda and the CCP board took a US$7 million loan through the National Investment Development Corporation to finance the remaining amount, a move that was heavily criticized by government opposition. Senator Ninoy Aquino strongly objected to the use of public funds for the center without congressional appropriation and branded it as an institution for the elite. Unfazed with the criticism, Marcos went ahead with the project and the Theater of Performing Arts (Now the Tanghalang Pambansa) of the Cultural Center of the Philippines was opened on September 8, 1969, three days before the President's 52nd birthday, with a three-month-long inaugural festival opened by Lamberto Avellana's musical Golden Salakot: Isang Dularawan, an epic portrayal of Panay Island. Among those who attended the inaugural night were California Governor Ronald Reagan and his wife, Nancy, both representing United States President Richard Nixon.

Early into the 1970s, the center was in the red mainly due to the costs of constructing the Theater of Performing Arts. In 1972, the board of the CCP asked Members of Congress to pass House Bill 4454, which would convert the center to become a non-municipal public corporation and allow it to use the principal of the CCP Trust Fund to pay off some of its debt. The bill would also continually support the center through a government subsidy amounting to the equivalent of 5% of the collected Amusement Tax annually. The proposed piece of legislation was met with strong opposition and was never passed. However, with the declaration of Martial Law on September 23, 1972, Congress was effectively dissolved; and President Marcos signed Proclamation No. 15, essentially a modified version of the proposed bill. The proclamation also expanded the center's role, from that of being a performance venue to an agency promoting and developing arts and culture throughout the country. Other notable developments during the year included the institution of the National Artist Awards and the foundation of the CCP Philharmonic Orchestra, the center's first resident company that would later become the Philippine Philharmonic Orchestra.

During this period of the Marcos Presidency, the CCP Complex played host to major local and international events under the guise of the Bagong Lipunan (New Society), which would mark the start of a series of major construction projects in the area. When Filipino Margie Moran won the 1973 Miss Universe Pageant, the Philippine Government agreed to stage the succeeding year's contest, and plans for an amphitheater commenced. Weeks of planning and discussions resulted in the commissioning of the Folk Arts Theater (Now the Tanghalang Francisco Balagtas), an open-air but roofed structure that could seat up to 10,000 people. Construction of the new theater, which was also designed by Leandro Locsin, was completed in a record 77 days and was inaugurated in July 1972 with the grand parade, "Kasaysayan ng Lahi" ("History of the Race"). Right after the inauguration of Folk Arts, ground was broken for the Philippine International Convention Center and the Philippine Plaza Hotel, both for the country's hosting of the IMF-World Bank Annual Meeting in 1976. Although not owned by the Cultural Center, these buildings were nevertheless built at the complex and designed by Locsin. One of the more infamous additions to the center was the Manila Film Center, built in 1981 for the Manila International Film Festival. Designed by Froilan Hong, the structure was built on a strict critical path schedule requiring 4,000 workers working in 3 shifts across 24 hours. An accident occurred on November 17, 1981, when scaffolding collapsed and sent construction workers into quick-drying cement. Despite this, construction proceeded and finished some 15 minutes before opening night of the Film Festival. The building's ownership would be transferred to the CCP in 1986 when the Experimental Cinema of the Philippines was dissolved. Straying from the brutalist style typical of the buildings in the CCP is the Coconut Palace, a showcase on the versatility of coconut as an export product and construction material, designed by Francisco Mañosa. The financial and human costs of constructing these buildings, in a time of widespread poverty and corruption, was seen as symptomatic of the First Lady's edifice complex, a charge Imelda has nevertheless welcomed in her later years.

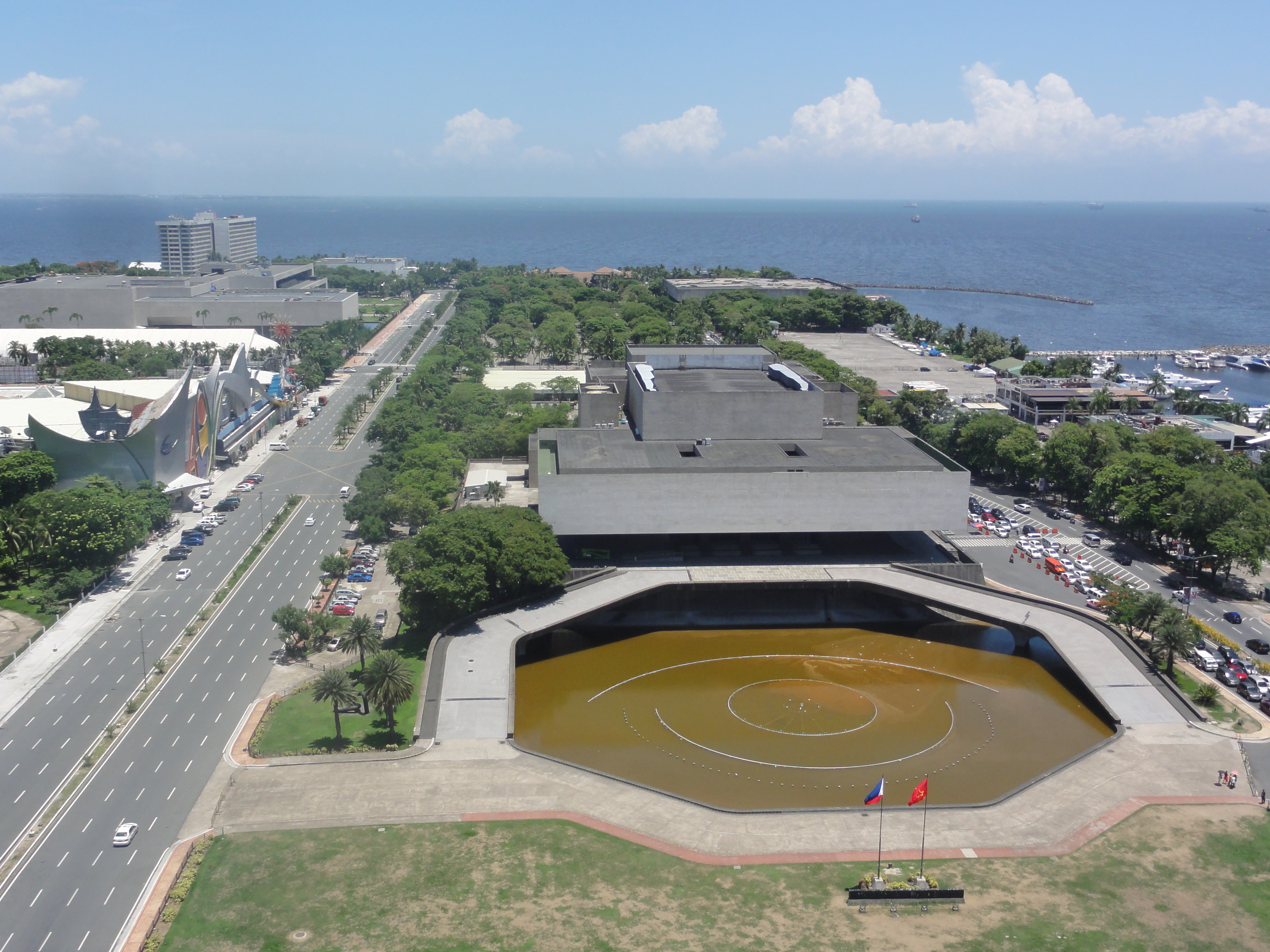
CCP Complex from the air.

The Marcos regime ended in 1986 through the peaceful People Power Revolution. Consequently, the CCP underwent a period of reform and "Filipinization." President Corazon Aquino appointed Maria Teresa Escoda-Roxas as the first president of the Cultural Center in the post-Marcos era; and once critic of the center for its promotion of elitist culture, Nicanor Tiongson, accepted the position to be the new artistic director. Together with its vice president, Florendo Garcia, the new leadership consulted with various stakeholders to formulate a new direction for the CCP and officially redefine its mission and objectives in pursuit of "a Filipino national culture evolving with and for the people." To set about decentralization, the Center formulates guidelines for setting-up local arts councils in local government units and establishes the CCP Exchange Artist Program to provide opportunities for regional groups to showcase their talents across the country. For the first time in her presidency, Aquino visited the center on January 11, 1987, to confer the National Artist Award to Atang de la Rama, marking the first time the awards were conferred through a process of democratic selection in addition to rigid criteria. Aquino would later confer the same award to Leandro Locsin in 1990, in recognition of his contribution to the field of architecture in the Philippines and in spite of his many contributions to the Marcos regime's architectural projects. Also in 1987, three groups joined the roster of the Cultural Center's resident companies: the Philippine Ballet Theatre, the Ramon Obusan Folkloric Group and Tanghalang Pilipino. As part of its outreach and research programs, the CCP produced a number of notable publications, including: Ani (English: Harvest) (1987), an arts journal; the Tuklas Sining (English: Discover Arts) (1989) series of monographs and videos on Philippine arts and the landmark 10-volume CCP Encyclopedia of Philippine Art (1994). Despite its attempts at reforms, some people still see the center in a less positive light. For instance, former president Gloria Macapagal Arroyo said that she finds the CCP to be "imposing, unapproachable, and elitist" for Filipino masses.

== Events and programs ==
The scope of activities the center engages in includes architecture, film and broadcast arts, dance, literature, music, new media, theatre, and visual arts. Aside from its promotion of local and indigenous artists, it has played host to numerous prominent and international artists like Van Cliburn, Plácido Domingo, Marcel Marceau, the Bolshoi Ballet, the Kirov Ballet, the Royal Ballet, the Royal Danish Ballet, the New York Philharmonic, and the Cleveland Symphony Orchestra among many others.

From 1972, the CCP administered the Order of the National Artists, which is the highest recognition the government of the Philippines gives to individuals who made significant contributions to the development of the arts in the country. The Order was established in 1972 after the death of the renowned painter Fernando Amorsolo, through the auspices of Proclamation No. 1001. A year later, the Board of Trustees of the center was designated as the National Artists Award Committee. Today, the CCP administers the Order in conjunction with the National Commission for Culture and the Arts.

Since its reform for democratization in 1986, the center has undertaken steps to bring culture and arts more accessible to a larger segment of Filipino society. Its Outreach Program conducts fora and art appreciation activities in various parts of the country, which includes the Sopas, Sining at Sorbetes Program (English: Food to Taste, Arts to Appreciate. Literally, Soup, Art and Ice Cream), a unique appreciation activity coupled with a feeding program for underprivileged youth. Every year since 2005, the center organizes its open house festival, Pasinaya (English: To Show. Literally, Debut or Inauguration) during February, designated as the National Arts Month in the Philippines. The Pasinaya festival features performing arts groups from all over the country, led by the center's resident companies, in a one-day showcase of local talent entirely held in the Tanghalang Pambansa's numerous venues. Two years after the first festival, it was visited by 10,000 people; growing to more than 84,000 by 2019. The CCP also provides institutional support to the Cinemalaya Philippine Independent Film Festival and the Philippine High School for the Arts.

=== Resident companies ===
- Ballet Philippines
- Bayanihan Philippine National Folk Dance Company
- National Music Competitions for Young Artists Foundation
- Philippine Ballet Theatre
- Philippine Madrigal Singers
- Philippine Philharmonic Orchestra
- Ramon Obusan Folkloric Group
- Tanghalang Pilipino
- UST Symphony Orchestra

== Management ==
The president and chief operating officer is Kaye C. Tinga while Dennis Marasigan is vice president and artistic director. The board of trustees is chaired by Jaime C. Laya. The other board members are:

- Maria Margarita Moran-Floirendo
- Carissa Coscolluela
- Marivic del Pilar
- Junie del Mundo
- Gizela M. Consunji
- Isidro Consunji
- Jonathan Velasco
- Felix "Monino" S. Duque
- Kaye C. Tinga

Presidents of the CCP

President	Term office	President in office
Jaime Zobel de Ayala	1969–1976	Ferdinand Marcos Sr.
Lucrecia Kasilag	1976–1986	Ferdinand Marcos Sr.
Ma. Teresa L. Escoda-Roxas	1986–1994	Corazon Aquino
Ma. Teresa L. Escoda-Roxas	1986–1994	Fidel Ramos
Francisco del Rosario, Jr.	1994–1995	Fidel Ramos
Baltazar Endriga	1995–1999	Fidel Ramos
Armita Rufino	1999–2001	Joseph Estrada
Nestor Jardin	2001–2009	Gloria Macapagal Arroyo
Isabel Caro Wilson	2009–2010	Gloria Macapagal Arroyo
Raul M. Sunico	2010–2017	Benigno Aquino III
Arsenio J. Lizaso	2017–2022	Rodrigo Duterte
Maria Margarita Moran-Floirendo	2022–2023	Bongbong Marcos
Michelle Nikki Junia	2023–2024	Bongbong Marcos
Kaye C. Tinga	2024–present	Bongbong Marcos

== Venues ==
=== CCP Complex ===
The Cultural Center owns and operates several performance venues in the Cultural Center of the Philippines Complex located in the reclaimed area shared between Pasay and Manila known as Bay City. Its flagship venue is the Tanghalang Pambansa (National Theater) which also houses its principal offices. The building contains three performing arts venues, one theater for film screenings, galleries, a museum, and the center's library and archives.

Also located in the CCP Complex is the Tanghalang Francisco Balagtas (Folk Arts Theater), an open-air auditorium.

=== National Arts Center ===
The Tanghalang Maria Makiling at the National Arts Center in Los Baños

The Cultural Center of the Philippines administers the National Arts Center, a 13.5-hectare (33-acre) complex at the Makiling Forest Reservation in Los Baños, Laguna. The complex hosts the Philippine High School for the Arts. Its flagship venue is the Tanghalang Maria Makiling, an open-air auditorium that can seat up to 1,800 people. The theater, which was also designed by Leandro V. Locsin, sits on a square plan dominated by a soaring pyramidal roof clad in clay tiles, a more literal interpretation of indigenous Filipino architecture when compared to the architect's previous works for the CCP.

=== Satellite venues ===
In response to the need to widen its audience for the arts and to bring its programs closer to the people, the CCP has established a programmatic partnership with the Assumption Antipolo and De La Salle Santiago Zobel School in Alabang, Muntinlupa. As CCP's Satellite Venues in the East and the South, these institutions commit to benefiting from the exchange of goodwill and assistance through move-over productions, performances, and artistic training workshops. Eventually, the center hopes to establish another satellite venue in the Northern part of Metro Manila.

==== The Angelo King Center for the Performing Arts ====
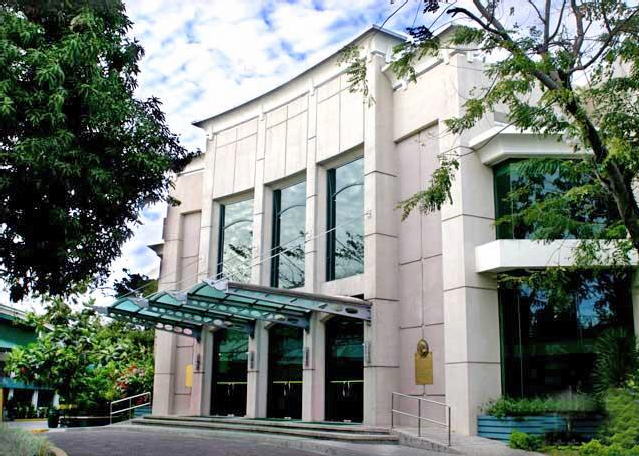
The façade of the Angelo King Center for the Performing Arts

The De La Salle Santiago Zobel School established the Angelo King Center for the Performing Arts in 2000 to support the holistic development of its students. The Center pushed the development of theatrical and musical talents on campus.

==== The Assumpta Theater ====
The Assumpta Theater was constructed in 1999 and inaugurated in 2001 and is located on the campus of Assumption Antipolo. It was envisioned to be a major cultural seat in eastern Metro Manila and serve as a venue for cultural education and development of the school and adjoining communities in Rizal. The theater accommodates 2,001 guests in a three-level seating arrangement. The stage area is equipped with 17 manual fly battens, a manual curtain system, and an orchestra pit.

== See also ==
- Arts of the Philippines
- Culture of the Philippines
- National Commission for Culture and the Arts

== Literature ==
- Lenzi, Iola (2004). Museums of Southeast Asia. Singapore: Archipelago Press. p. 200 pages. ISBN 981-4068-96-9.
