= Behest loan =

The term behest loan refers to a loan granted to individuals or corporations favored by a powerful government official despite their lack of qualifications to receive such a loan. It is a mechanism for graft and political corruption particularly used in authoritarian regimes, where financial institutions such as banks are placed under intense pressure to approve such loans "at the behest" of high officials. The term has historically been most associated with the cronies of Ferdinand Marcos, although other officials have also been accused of engaging in the practice.
