= Lung Center of the Philippines =

Government hospital in Quezon City, Philippines

- Department of Health

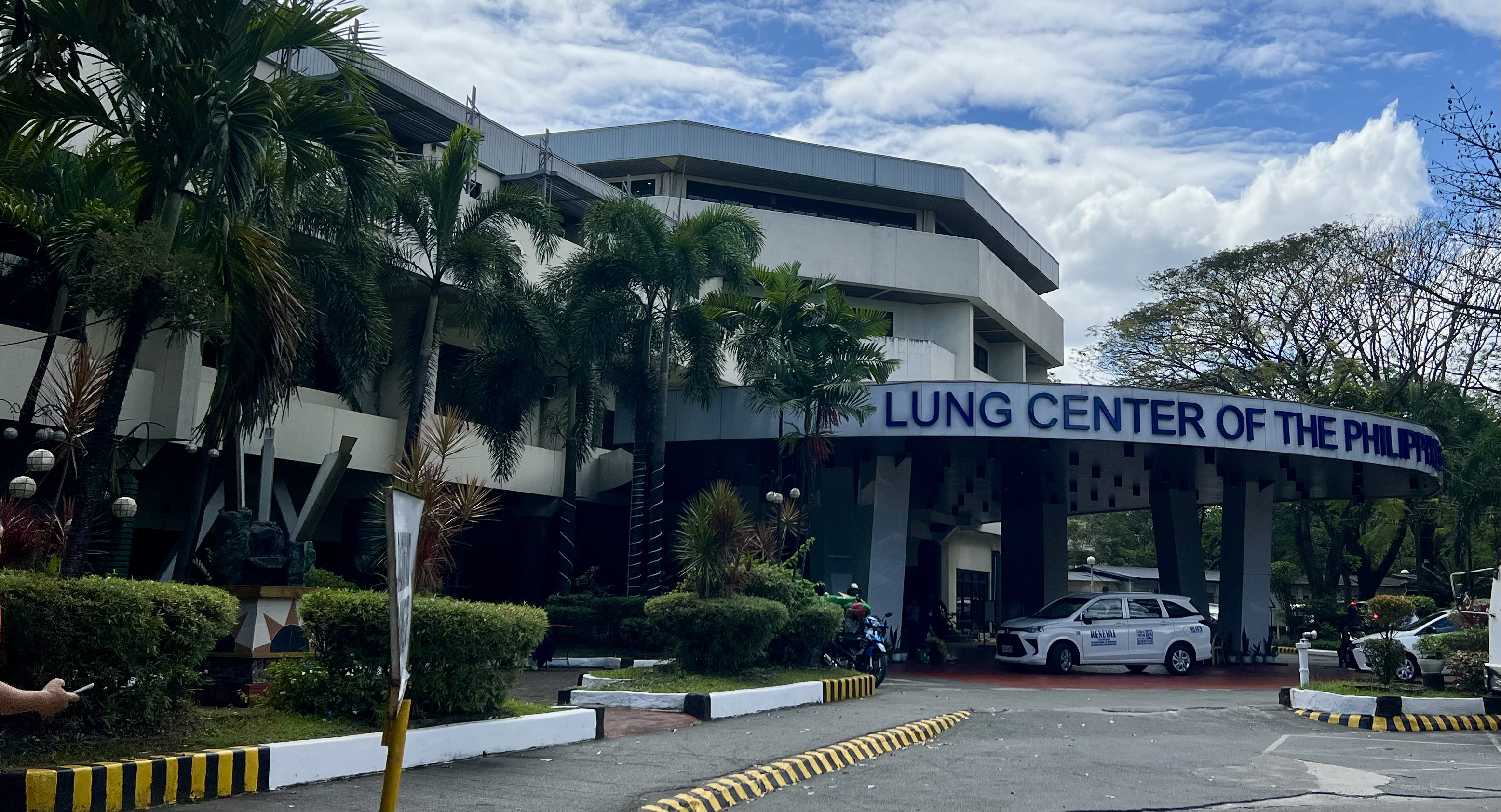

- Location within Metro Manila Location within Luzon Location within Philippines

Geography
- Location: Quezon City, Metro Manila, Philippines
- Coordinates: 14°38′51″N 121°02′45″E

Organization
- Type: Tertiary

Services
- Emergency department: 24-hour emergency department
- Beds: 210

History
- Founded: January 16, 1981; 45 years ago
- Closed: May 16, 1998 (reopened on March 1, 1999)

Links
- Website: lcp.gov.ph
- Lists: Hospitals in the Philippines

The Lung Center of the Philippines (LCP; Filipino: Ospital ng Pilipinas sa Maysakit sa Bagà) is a government tertiary hospital specializing in the prevention and treatment of lung and other chest diseases. It is located in Central, Quezon City, Philippines. The center receives budgetary support from the national government for its operations. It was constructed on public land donated by the National Housing Authority.

The Lung Center has a capacity of 210 beds.

== History ==
The LCP was established on January 16, 1981, by President Ferdinand Marcos under Presidential Decree No. 1823 as a non-profit non-stock corporation. The building is identified with what is referred to as the Marcoses' "edifice complex," defined by architect Gerard Lico as "an obsession and compulsion to build edifices as a hallmark of greatness."

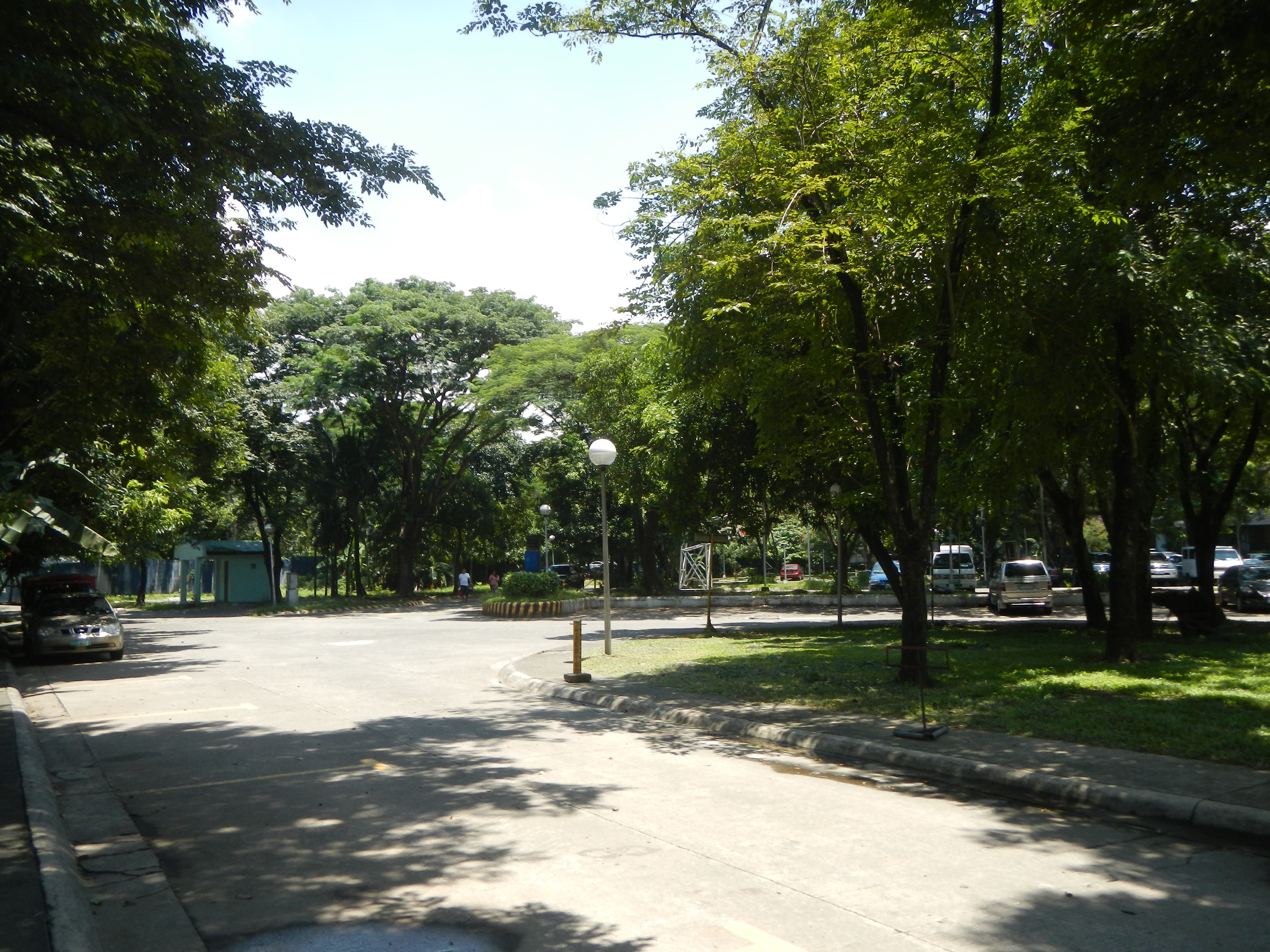
Facade

The Lung Center was placed under the administration of the Ministry of Health (now Department of Health) by President Corazon Aquino on July 29, 1986, under Executive Order No. 34. The purpose of its creation was to provide healthcare that specifically targets lung and pulmonary disease.

A fire on May 16, 1998, destroyed much of the LCP's building and equipment. The fire, which started on 2:20 a.m., claimed 11 lives with nine more missing. Calixto Zaldivar, the director of the Lung Center, was indicted on October 19, 1999, for criminal negligence. He was accused of ignoring advice from fire inspectors to install safety equipment at the Lung Center.

The Lung Center was reopened on March 1, 1999, and a new LCP building partly funded by its fire insurance began construction.

The Lung Center runs one of three monitoring stations run under an air quality monitoring project in Metro Manila.

In January 2019, the Duterte administration established the Philippines' 19th Malasakit Center at the Lung Center. On January 23, 2024, President Bongbong Marcos launched the country's first Lung Transplant Program at the Center in collaboration with the National Kidney and Transplant Institute.
