= Tanghalang Francisco Balagtas =

Arts center in Metro Manila, Philippines

Francisco Balagtas Theater
- Tanghalang Francisco Balagtas
- The Tanghalang Francisco Balagtas in 2019

- Location in Metro Manila Location in Luzon Location in the Philippines
- Former names: Folk Arts Theater (1974 - 2001)
- Address: Cultural Center of the Philippines Complex, Roxas Boulevard, Malate, Manila; Philippines
- Coordinates: 14°33′24″N 120°58′51″E
- Operator: Cultural Center of the Philippines
- Capacity: 8,458
- Type: National

Construction
- Opened: July 7, 1974
- Closed: March 2020
- Architect: Leandro Locsin

The Tanghalang Francisco Balagtas (English: Francisco Balagtas Theater), formerly known as the Folk Arts Theater, was a theater located in the Cultural Center of the Philippines Complex in Malate, Manila. It is a covered proscenium amphitheater owned by the Cultural Center of the Philippines that was a popular venue for concerts during the 1980s and 1990s. The theater, named after Filipino poet Francisco Balagtas, has a seating capacity of 8,458 in 10 sections and features a broad fascia with a single column-to-column span of 80 meters (260 ft). It is the largest single-span structure in the country, with a 100-by-100-meter (330 ft × 330 ft) roof resting on eight monumental columns. In her book "Cultural Center of the Philippines: Crystal Years," Visitacion de la Torre described it as a sheltered plaza with a roof that "appears to float, creating the impression that the building is a dream on one's tender hands."

The Tanghalan was commissioned by then First Lady Imelda Marcos for the Miss Universe 1974 Pageant, which was to be held in the country for the first time. It was designed by Leandro V. Locsin and built in a record 77 days in time for the pageant. It was originally built to seat an audience of 10,000. It was not air-conditioned and was designed to allow a natural breeze to flow through.

The theater was inaugurated on July 7, 1974, with an extravagant cultural showcase dubbed "Kasaysayan ng Lahi", which featured a military parade by personnel of the Armed Forces of the Philippines. It hosted the international pageant in the same month where Amparo Muñoz of Spain won the title. In 1978, the theater was the venue of the first Philippine Folk Festival, and the first Metropop Song Festival. It was also one of the venues of the Manila International Film Festival, annual Lenten folk presentations, misas de gallo, and an Alamat series depicting Filipino legends or epics through dance and drama.

The theater has hosted many popular musical acts of the mid-1980s to the late 1990s, including Janet Jackson, Frank Sinatra, Paula Abdul, Puerto Rican group Menudo, British pop group 5ive, Pearl Jam, Mr. Big, James Ingram, Gary Valenciano, Martin Nievera, Kenny Loggins, Christopher Cross, and Regine Velasquez, and magician David Copperfield. The Folk Arts Theater is also used by different religious groups. Day by Day Christian Ministries, a large international religious organization, leased the area from 2005 to 2020. They have dedicated the Theatre as Bulwagan ng Panginoón (English: Hall of the Lord).

The building also housed the main office of the National Music Competitions for Young Artists Foundation and the Printmakers Association of the Philippines. The building eventually closed in March 2020 amidst the early days of the COVID-19 pandemic in the Philippines. Even before the pandemic, there were already structural damages around the building and the CCP was undergoing a redevelopment process.

Preceded by Odeon of Herodes Atticus (Greece) Athens	Miss Universe venue 1974	Succeeded by National Gymnasium (El Salvador) San Salvador
