= Tomas Morato Avenue =

Road in Quezon City, Philippines

Coordinates: 14°37′53″N 121°02′04″E

- Don Tomas Morato Avenue
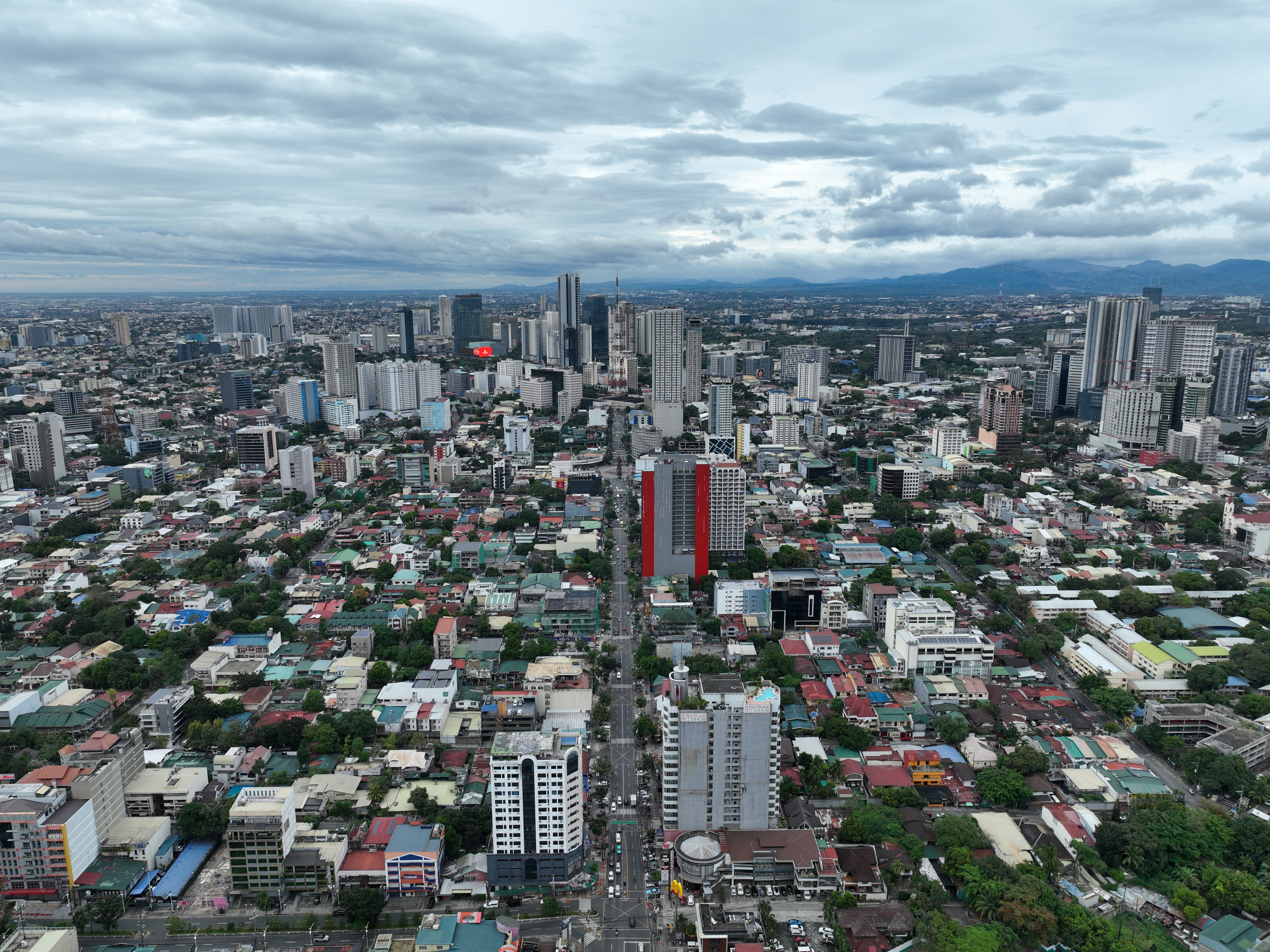
- Aerial view of Tomas Morato Avenue (2026)
- Interactive map of Tomas Morato Avenue
- Former name: Sampaloc Avenue (until 1966)
- Namesake: Tomas Morato
- Type: Tertiary road
- Maintained by: Department of Public Works and Highways (DPWH) – Quezon City 2nd District Engineering Office
- Length: 1.684 km (1.046 mi)
- Location: Quezon City
- North end: Eugenio Lopez Drive
- Major junctions: N170 (Timog Avenue)
- South end: Eulogio Rodriguez Sr. Avenue

Construction
- Inauguration: c. 1940

Tomas Morato Avenue is a street located in Quezon City within the Diliman and New Manila areas of northeastern Metro Manila, Philippines. The street links Eulogio Rodriguez Sr. Avenue in the village of Mariana in the south with Eugenio Lopez Drive (also known as Scout Albano Street) in South Triangle in the north and passes through Barangays Sacred Heart, Laging Handa, Kamuning, Obrero, and Kristong Hari. It was named after the first mayor of Quezon City.

The street is known as a trendy restaurant row located in Quezon City's entertainment area along with Timog Avenue and West Avenue. It is also known for its bars, discos, karaoke and comedy clubs, and as a popular hangout for local actors who work in the nearby studios such as the ABS-CBN Broadcasting Center on Mother Ignacia Avenue and GMA Network Center on Timog Avenue corner EDSA, as well as millennials.

== Route description ==
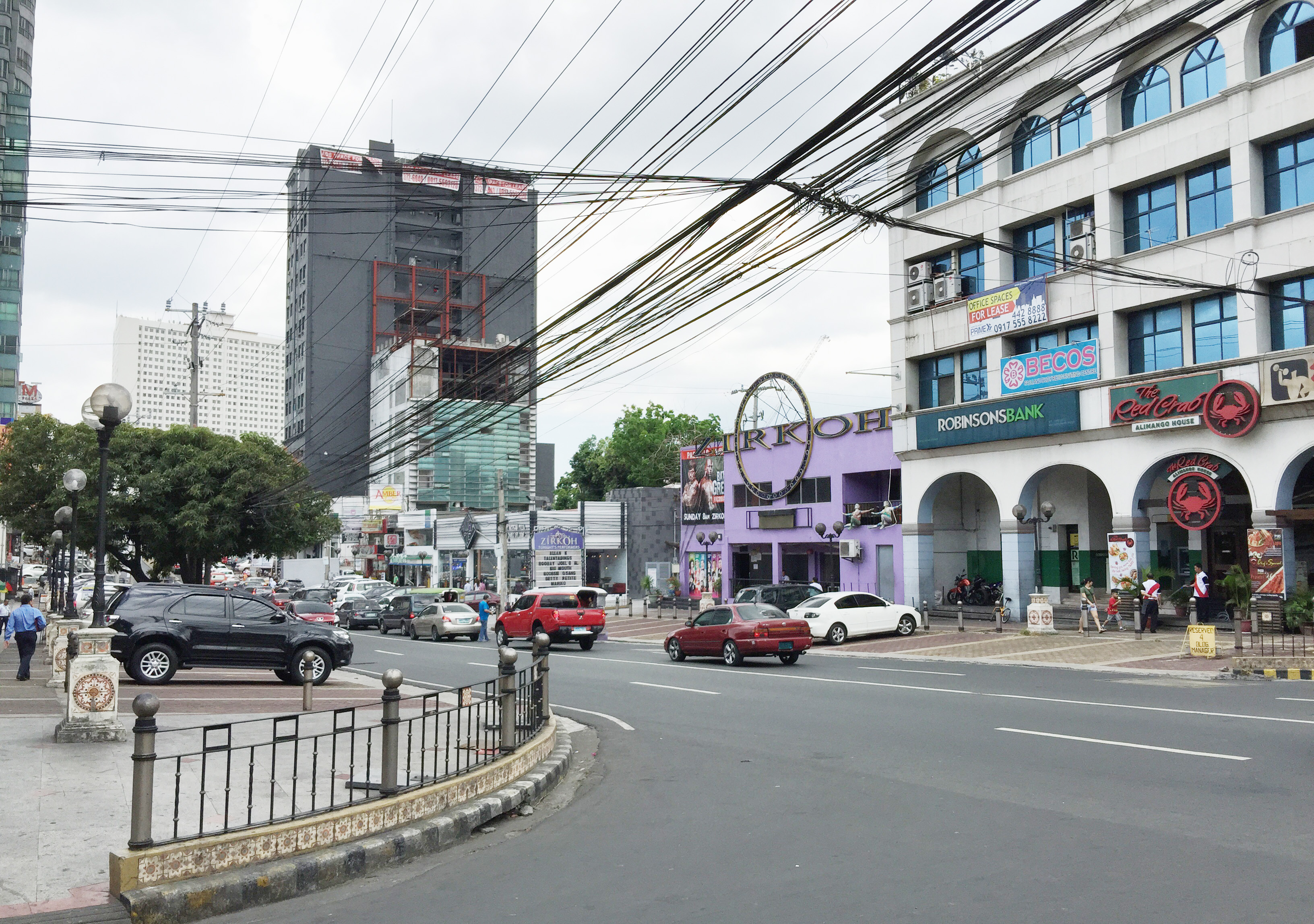
Tomas Morato Avenue as seen from Scout Delgado Street

Tomas Morato Avenue runs in a north–south direction and has four lanes, two lanes going in each direction. Beginning at the intersection with Eulogio Rodriguez Sr. Avenue in New Manila, the road traverses barangay Kristong Hari and quickly enters the barangays Obrero and Kamuning in the district of Diliman towards the junction with Kamuning Road. Upon crossing Don Alejandro Roces Avenue (formerly Calle Retiro), it enters the Scout areas, home to most of the street's famous restaurants and bars, where the road serves as the border between barangays Laging Handa and Sacred Heart up to the intersection with Timog Avenue. The streets in this area were named in honor of the 22 Boy Scouts who died in a plane crash en route to joining the 11th World Scout Jamboree. A memorial stands at the center of the rotunda at the intersection of Tomas Morato with Timog Avenue. Near the Scouting Memorial is the location of the former Ozone Disco. Past the memorial rotunda, the avenue enters barangay South Triangle, ending at a T-intersection with Eugenio Lopez Drive by the ELJ Communications Center.

== History ==
The street, which opened around 1940, was originally named Sampaloc Avenue. It was named because of the prevalence of tamarind (sampaloc) trees which lined the street in the early days. It is believed that the trees were planted by Tomas Morato himself, along with President Manuel Luis Quezon and journalist Alejandro Roces. According to the Master Plan of Quezon City, it was planned to stretch between New Manila and a proposed park near the present-day intersection of EDSA and Quezon Avenue at the National Government Center I. As of 2012, however, only two sampaloc trees remain, as they have been cut down over the years to make way for parking spaces.

In 1966, the avenue was renamed to honor Tomas Morato, the city's first mayor under whose term the road was constructed. By the 1990s, the street was transformed into a trendy hot spot with bars lining the street, such as the popular Tia Maria's. In 1996, one of the deadliest nightclub fires occurred at the Ozone Disco Club on Tomas Morato and Timog Avenue. In 2003, the street underwent a major renovation, with the sidewalk improved and railings installed along corners of the avenue to prevent double parking.

Since 2024, proposals have been raised by the Quezon City government to pedestrianize the avenue on Sundays.

== Intersections ==
The entire route is located in Quezon City.

km	mi	Destinations	Notes
		Eugenio Lopez Sr. Drive	Northern Terminus. One-way road. Access to N170 (Quezon Avenue) & N171 (West Avenue) via Examiner Street.
		Scout Bayoran Street	
		Scout Borromeo Street	
		Scout Madriñan Street	
		N172 (Timog Avenue)	Site of the 11th World Scout Jamboree Memorial Rotonda. Access to West & East Avenues on opposite directions.
		Scout Rallos Street	One-way road.
		Scout Limbaga Street	One-way road.
		Scout Fernandez Street	One-way road. Access to St. Mary's College of Quezon City.
		Scout Fuentebella Street	One-way road.
		Scout Gandia Street	One-way road.
		Scout De Guia Street	One-way road.
		Scout Dr. Lazcano Street	Access to Capitol Medical Center.
		Scout Delgado Street	One-way road.
		Scout Lozano Street	One-way road. Alternative access to Kamuning area & E. Rodriguez Sr. Avenue via Scout Torillo Street.
		Scout Castor Street	One-way road.
		Don Alejandro Roces Avenue	Traffic light intersection. Access to Roxas district & Amoranto Sports Complex.
		Marathon Street	Southbound only.
		Makabayan Street	Southbound only.
		Kamuning Road	Traffic light intersection. Access to EDSA & Kamias Road.
		Rolling Road	Southbound only.
		Balete Drive Extension	
		Eulogio Rodriguez Sr. Avenue	Southern terminus. Access to St. Luke's Medical Center, Welcome Rotonda, New Manila & Cubao areas.
1.000 mi = 1.609 km; 1.000 km = 0.621 mi: Incomplete access
