= North Avenue (Quezon City) =

Avenue in Metro Manila, Philippines

Coordinates: 14°39′13″N 121°2′17″E

North Avenue

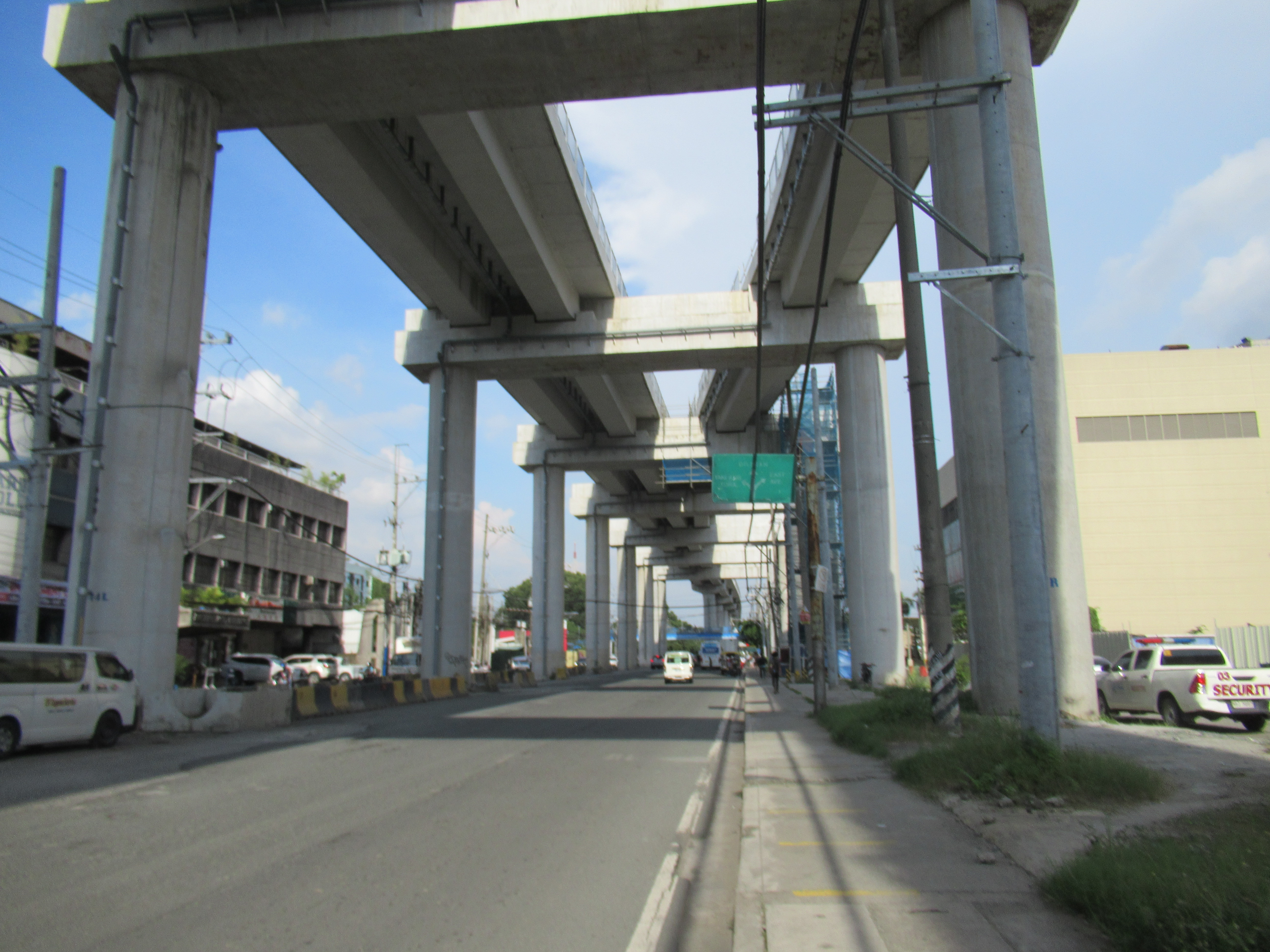
- North Avenue with the under-construction MRT Line 7

Route information
- Maintained by the Department of Public Works and Highways – Quezon City 1st Engineering District Office
- Length: 1.786 km (1.110 mi)

Major junctions
- West end: AH 26 (N1) (EDSA)
- N128 (Mindanao Avenue)
- East end: N170 (Elliptical Road)

Location
- Country: Philippines
- Major cities: Quezon City

Highway system
- Roads in the Philippines; Highways; Expressways; List
← N172	→ N174

North Avenue is a major road located in Quezon City within the Diliman area of northeastern Metro Manila, Philippines. It runs east–west through barangays Bagong Pag-asa, Project 6, and Vasra, forming the northern part of the North Triangle area. The street is located in Quezon City's mixed-use and government area, known for its malls, condominiums, hotels, and the upcoming QC CBD. It is also home to SM North EDSA, Trinoma, and Ayala Malls Vertis North, located on the avenue's junction with Epifanio de los Santos Avenue (EDSA). The entire avenue is designated National Route 173 (N173) of the Philippine highway network.

== Route description ==
North Avenue is a six-lane road located at the heart of Quezon City's mixed-use and government district. It begins at its junction with EDSA north of West Avenue in Barangay Bagong Pag-asa in central Diliman. It heads east from this junction to cross Mindanao Avenue, which forms the boundary of barangays Bagong Pag-asa and Project 6, towards Senator Miriam P. Defensor-Santiago Avenue (formerly Agham Road). Located on or near this western section of North Avenue are North Avenue Station, SM North EDSA, TriNoma, Ayala Malls Vertis North, Seda Hotel Vertis North, and Vertis North CBD. After crossing Senator Miriam P. Defensor-Santiago Avenue, the eastern section of the avenue is dominated by government establishments, including the Philippine Science High School, Bureau of Fire Protection National Headquarters, Office of the Ombudsman, Veterans Memorial Medical Center and Golf Complex, National Food Authority Office, Sugar Regulatory Administration Office, and the Ninoy Aquino Parks & Wildlife Center. The avenue terminates at the junction with Elliptical Road.

== History ==
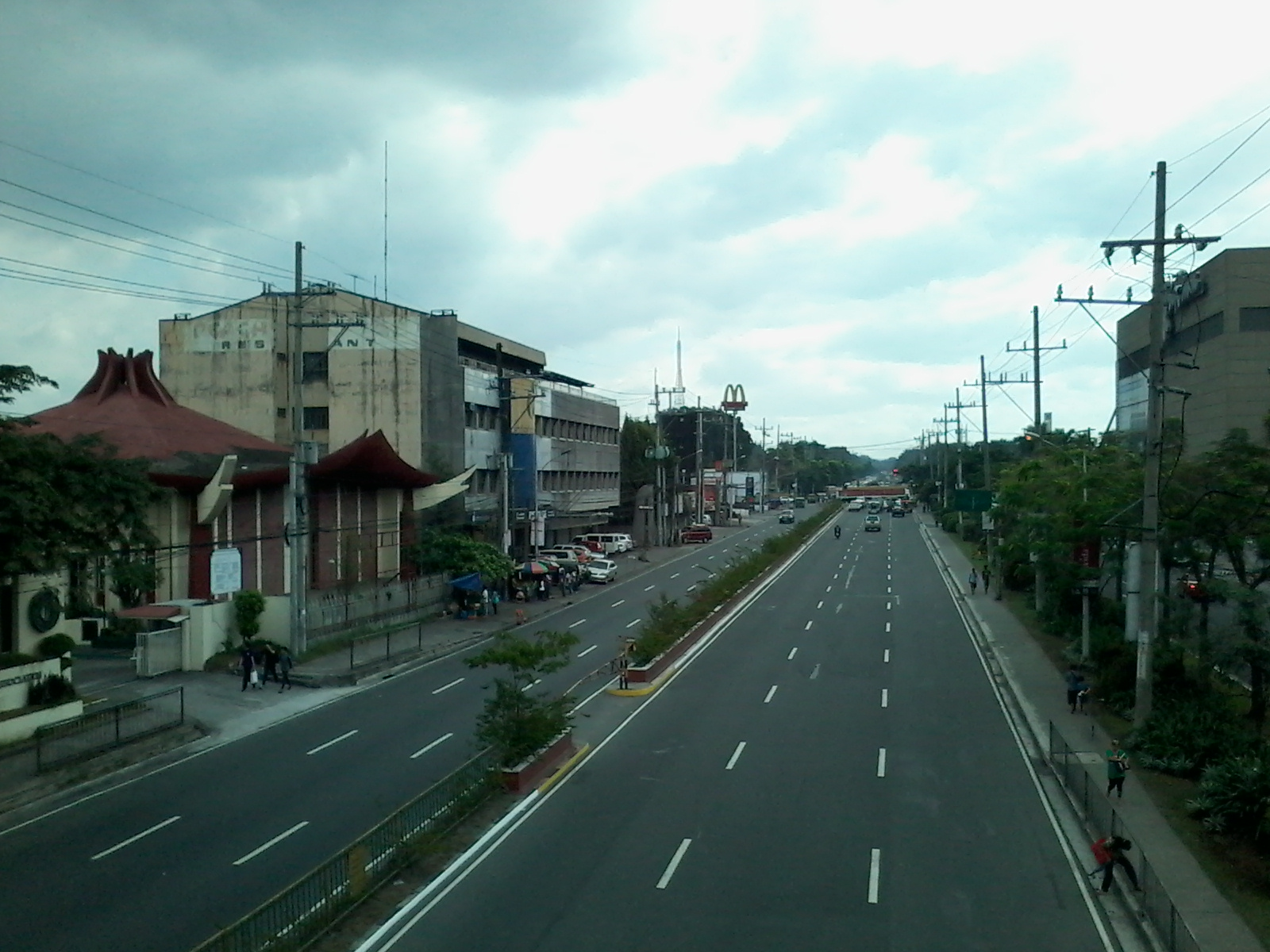
North Avenue in January 2016, prior to the construction of MRT Line 7

Previously called Hilaga Avenue (Tagalog for north), the avenue forms the northern boundary of the formerly proposed 400-hectare (990-acre) Diliman Quadrangle within the former Diliman Estate, also known as Hacienda de Tuason, purchased by the Philippine Commonwealth government in 1939 as the new capital to replace Manila. It was originally planned as the new city's Central Park, housing the new national government buildings (the new presidential palace, Capitol Building, and Supreme Court complex) within the 25-hectare (62-acre) elliptical site now known as the Quezon Memorial Circle, according to the Frost Plan. The quadrangle is surrounded by North Avenue to the north, East Avenue to the east, Timog (South) Avenue to the south, and West Avenue to the west. The avenue was also slated to be the site of 15-hectare (37-acre) National Exposition grounds opposite its corner with the Manila Circumferential Road (present-day EDSA); the grounds are now occupied notably by SM North EDSA. The Diliman Quadrangle had been largely undeveloped for decades due to lack of funding. After several revisions, the government planners moved the city center to Novaliches due to its higher elevation. By 1976, the country's capital had been transferred back to Manila, with only the Quezon Memorial built in the former capital site.

== Intersections ==
The entire route is located in Quezon City.

km	mi	Destinations	Notes
		AH 26 (N1) (EDSA) – Balintawak, NLEX	No access from EDSA southbound. Western terminus.
		Mindanao Avenue – Novaliches, Valenzuela, NLEX Harbor Link	Traffic light intersection. Southward segment meets up with EDSA northbound.
		Vertis Drive – Vertis North	Access to Ayala Malls Vertis North. Eastbound only.
		Senator Miriam P. Defensor-Santiago Avenue (formerly Agham Road)	Traffic light intersection; access to Philippine Science High School. No thru traffic allowed from eastbound.
		VMMC Access Road – Veterans Memorial Medical Center	Traffic light intersection.
		N170 (Elliptical Road) – Quezon City Hall	Eastern terminus.
1.000 mi = 1.609 km; 1.000 km = 0.621 mi: Incomplete access
