= Don Mariano Marcos Avenue =

Don Mariano Marcos Avenue is a former street name that may refer to:

- Quezon Avenue, a major thoroughfare in Quezon City
- Commonwealth Avenue, a major thoroughfare in Quezon City
