= National Kidney and Transplant Institute =

Government hospital in Quezon City, Philippines

- Department of Health

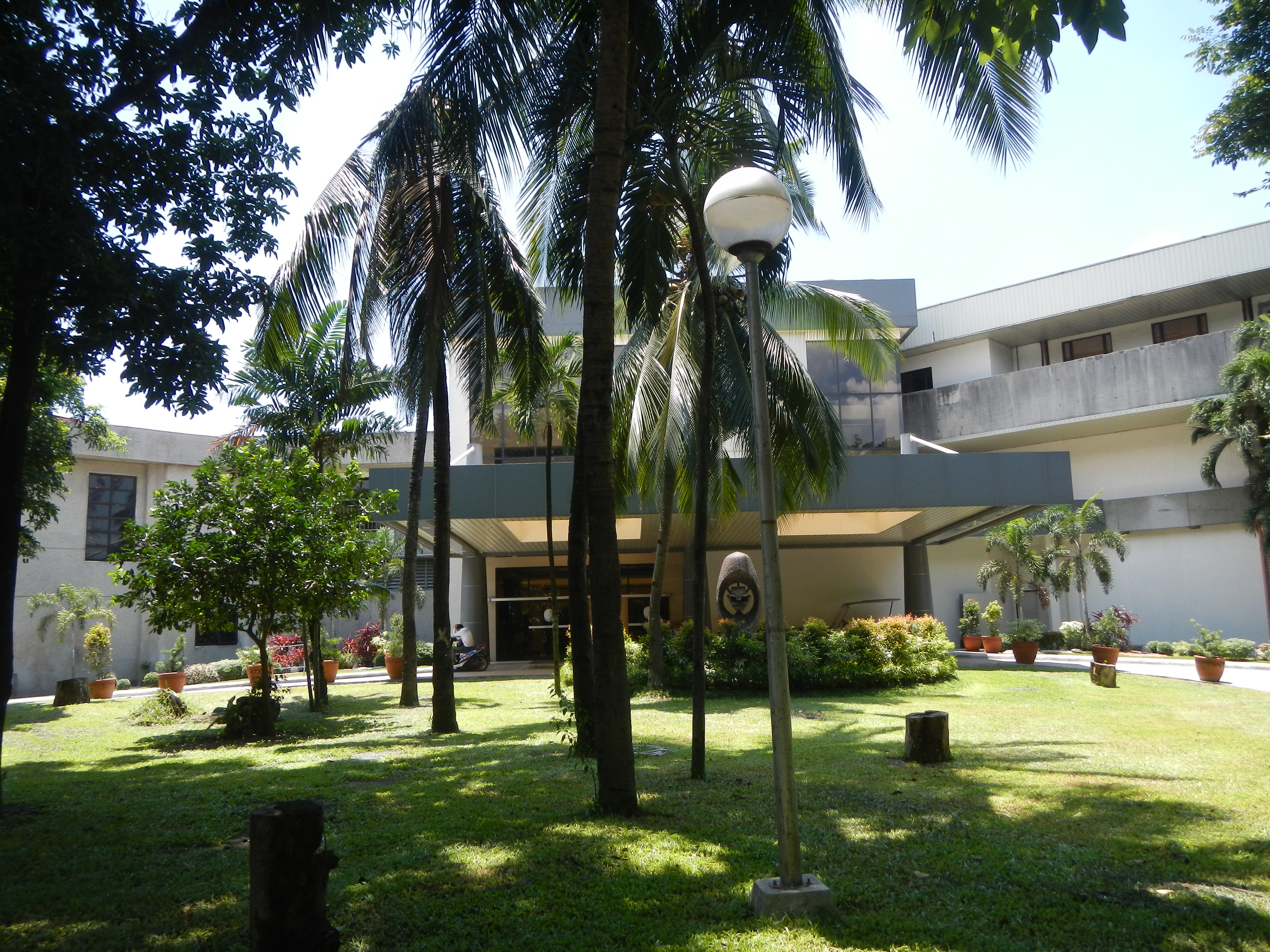

- Location within Metro Manila Location within Luzon Location within Philippines

Geography
- Location: Quezon City, Metro Manila, Philippines
- Coordinates: 14°38′50″N 121°02′50″E

Services
- Beds: 385

History
- Former names: National Kidney Foundation of the Philippines (1981–1986); National Kidney Institute (1986–1995)
- Founded: February 1983; 43 years ago

Links
- Website: www.nkti.gov.ph
- Lists: Hospitals in the Philippines

The National Kidney and Transplant Institute (NKTI; Filipino: Pambansang Surian sa Bato at Transplant) is a tertiary referral hospital located in Central, Quezon City, Philippines.

The NKTI serves as a referral hospital for nephrology patients from regional hospitals across the Philippines and provides voluntary blood services.

== History ==
The National Kidney Foundation of the Philippines (NKFP) was established on January 16, 1981 via Presidential Decree 1832 of President Ferdinand Marcos.

The cornerstone of the NKFP was laid on February 23, 1983. On the same day a team led by doctor G. Baird Helfirch performed the first kidney transplant at the NKFP site. Claver Ramos, a doctor, served as the inaugural director of the NKFP. The year is recognized as the hospital's foundation year. It started as a 50-bed facility.

From April 26 to July 31, 1983, the NKFP Annex Building was constructed. Construction of the Main Building started in 1984.

In August 1984 and November 1985, two kidney transplant operations were clandestinely conducted on President Marcos. This came at the time when Marcos was rumored to be seriously ill since the early 1980s. The government has rejected the claims at the time.

The NKFP was renamed as the National Kidney Institute on November 12, 1986.

The facility adopted its current name, the National Kidney and Transplant Institute (NKTI) via Republic Act No. 8020 which lapsed into law on May 25, 1995. In 1998, the nearby Lung Center of the Philippines was razed by fire also affecting the NKTI.

In September 2012, the National Housing Authority, the owner of the lot of NKTI, attempted sell the portions of the property occupied by the hospital. SM Development Corporation reportedly won the bid. The sale was aborted around January 2013.

The groundbreaking ceremony for a new 13-storey building within the compound was held in June 2024. It is projected to finish by 2027.

== Facilities ==
The National Kidney and Transplant Institute sits in the center of a 58,599-square-meter (630,750 sq ft) lot, along East Avenue and adjacent to the Elliptical Road in Quezon City.

The NKTI itself consists of three connected buildings: the Main Building, the Annex Building, and the Dialysis Center. The Main Building contains most of the cost centers and administrative offices. The Annex Building includes the Marcos Wing, the Radiology Department, the Center for Special Services, and the Emergency Department.

The 13-storey building under-construction within the compound will be a dialysis center will have 200 dialysis machines.

== Services ==
In January 23, 2024, Bongbong Marcos launched the country’s first Lung Transplant Program at the Lung Center of the Philippines in collaboration with the NKTI.
