= East Avenue (Quezon City) =

Major road in Quezon City, Philippines

East Avenue

- View of East Avenue near the intersection with Epifanio de los Santos Avenue (EDSA), looking northeast towards Elliptical Road (October 2026)

Route information
- Maintained by Department of Public Works and Highways – Quezon City 2nd Engineering District Office
- Length: 2 km (1.2 mi)
- Component highways: N174

Major junctions
- North end: N170 (Elliptical Road)
- South end: AH26 (EDSA)

Location
- Country: Philippines
- Major cities: Quezon City

Highway system
- Roads in the Philippines; Highways; Expressways; List
← N173	→ N175

East Avenue is a major street in the Diliman area of Quezon City, Philippines. It runs north–south through the eastern edge of Triangle Park. The street is within Quezon City's government area, known for national and local government institutions, offices, and hospitals. It is also home to the Quezon City Hall Complex on the avenue's junction with Elliptical Road. The entire avenue is designated National Route 174 (N174) of the Philippine highway network.

== Route description ==
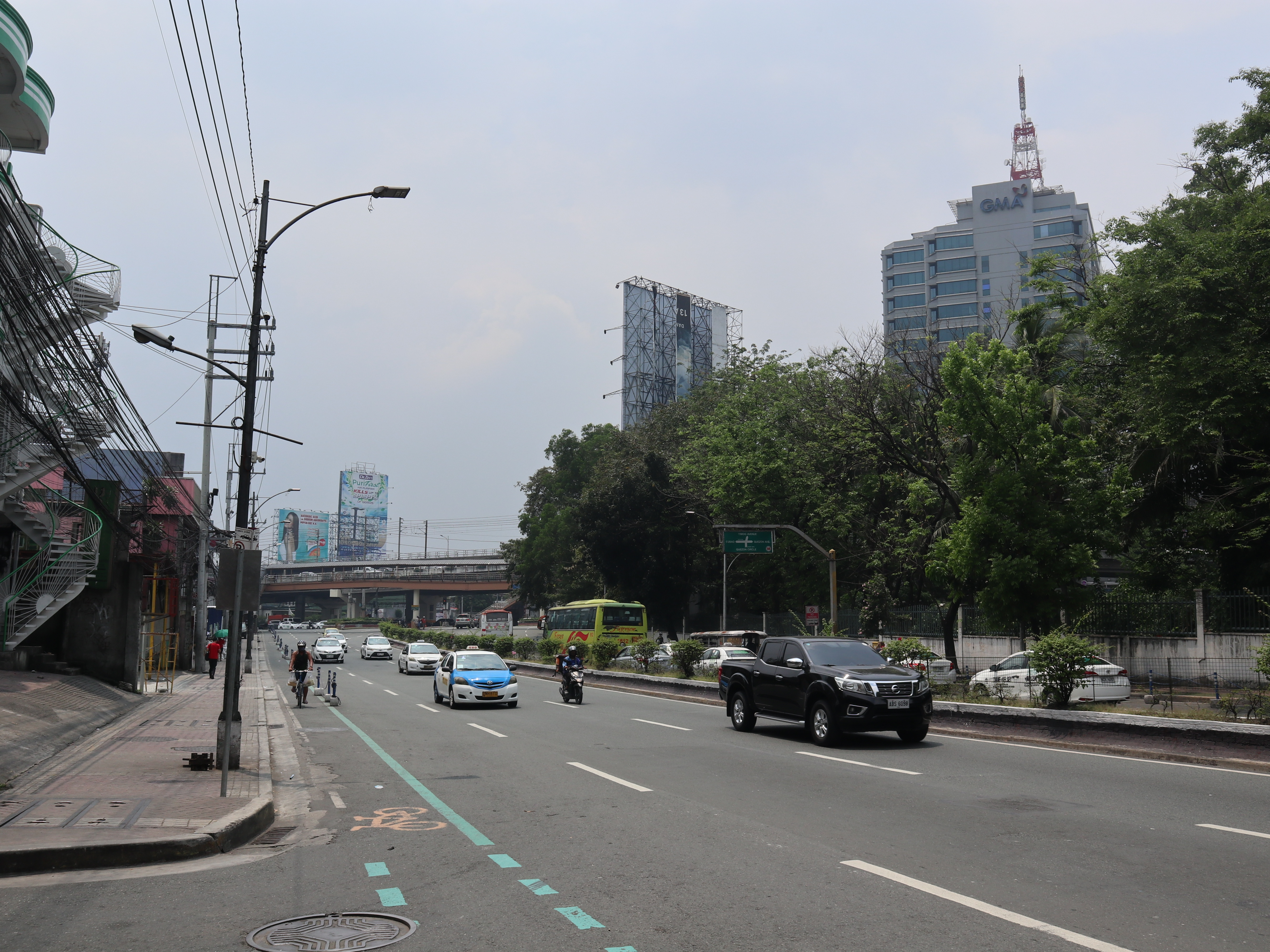
East Avenue looking southwest towards Epifanio de los Santos Avenue (EDSA)

East Avenue is a six-lane road at the heart of Quezon City's government district. It begins at its junction with Epifanio de los Santos Avenue (EDSA) east of Timog Avenue by the border of barangay Pinyahan in central Diliman. It heads north from this junction to cross Magalang Street, NIA Road, V. Luna Avenue, Matapang Street, Sen. Miriam P. Defensor-Santiago Avenue (formerly BIR Road), Matalino Street, Makatarungan Street, and Mayaman Street towards the Quezon Memorial Circle. The avenue terminates at the intersection with Elliptical Road.

=== Landmarks ===
Located on or near this southern section of East Avenue are the GMA–Kamuning MRT station, LTO Central Office, LTFRB Central Office, DPWH Region IV-A Offices, National Intelligence Coordinating Agency Office, Land Registration Authority Office, Philippine Statistics Authority main office, and the Social Security System Main Office. After crossing the Sen. Miriam P. Defensor-Santiago Avenue, the western section is dominated by more government establishments, particularly medical institutions, including East Avenue Medical Center, Bangko Sentral ng Pilipinas Security Plant Complex, Philippine Heart Center, Laguna Lake Development Authority headquarters, National Kidney and Transplant Institute, and the Quezon City Hall Complex.

== History ==
Previously called Silangan Avenue (Tagalog for east), the avenue forms the eastern boundary of the formerly proposed 400-hectare (990-acre) Diliman Quadrangle within the former Diliman Estate, also known as Hacienda de Tuason, purchased by the Philippine Commonwealth government in 1939 as the new capital to replace Manila. It was originally planned as the new city's Central Park, housing the new national government buildings (the new presidential palace, Capitol Building, and Supreme Court complex) within the 25-hectare (62-acre) elliptical site now known as the Quezon Memorial Circle, according to the Frost Plan. The quadrangle is surrounded by North Avenue to the north, East Avenue to the east, Timog (South) Avenue to the south, and West Avenue to the west. The Diliman Quadrangle had been largely undeveloped for decades due to a lack of funding, so after several revisions, the government planners moved the city center to Novaliches due to its higher elevation. By 1976, the country's capital had been transferred back to Manila, with only the Quezon Memorial built in the former capital site. In 1984, the avenue, alongside Timog Avenue, was renamed President Carlos P. Garcia Avenue after the former president.

== Intersections ==
The entire route is located in Quezon City.

km	mi	Destinations	Notes
		AH26 (EDSA)	Traffic light intersection. Southern terminus. Continues as N172 (Timog Avenue).
		Magalang Street	Northbound only
		NIA Road	Southbound only
		V. Luna Avenue	Traffic light intersection. Access to Kamias Road and Cubao district via Kalayaan Avenue.
		Matapang Street	Northbound only
		Senator Miriam P. Defensor-Santiago Avenue (formerly BIR Road)	Traffic light intersection. Access to North and Quezon Avenues.
		Matalino Street	Traffic light intersection. Access to Kalayaan Avenue.
		Makatarungan Street	Northbound only
		Mayaman Street	Northbound only. Serves Quezon City Hall Gate 3.
		N170 (Elliptical Road)	Northern terminus
1.000 mi = 1.609 km; 1.000 km = 0.621 mi: Incomplete access
