= Elliptical Road =

Large roundabout in Quezon City, Philippines

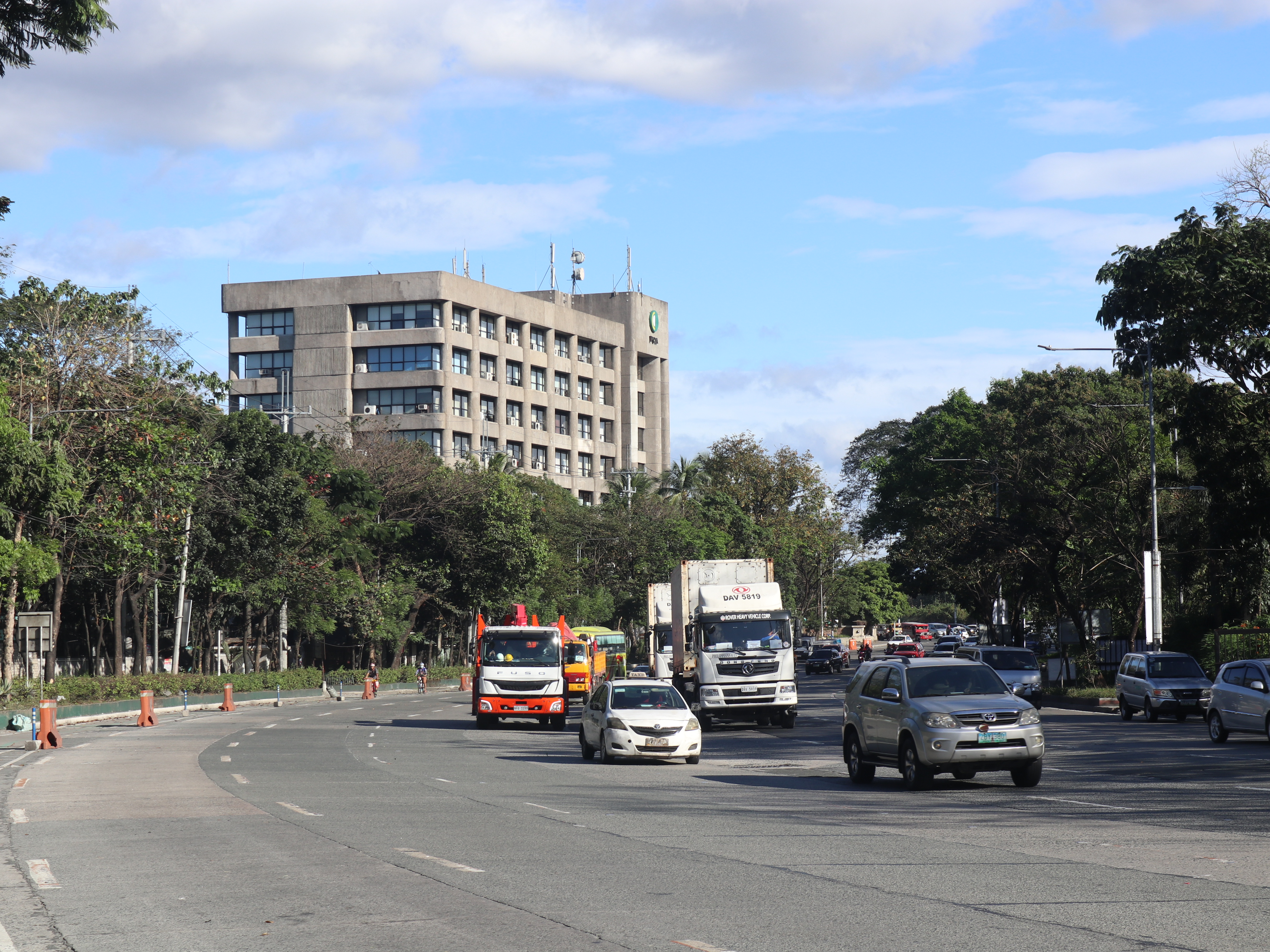
- The Elliptical Road in 2023, viewed from Visayas Avenue, with the Philippine Coconut Authority (PHILCOA) headquarters visible in the background.
- Interactive map of Elliptical Road

Location
- Quezon City, Metro Manila
- Coordinates: 14.651489°N 121.049309°E
- Roads at junction: N170 (Commonwealth Avenue); Visayas Avenue; N173 (North Avenue); N170 (Quezon Avenue); N174 (East Avenue); Kalayaan Avenue; Maharlika Street

Construction
- Type: Roundabout
- Lanes: 8
- Maintained by: Department of Public Works and Highways (DPWH) - Quezon City 2nd District Engineering Office

The Elliptical Road is a 1.98-kilometer (1.23 mi) roundabout in Quezon City, which circumscribes the Quezon Memorial Circle, a large park. It was named after its elliptical shape. The road is divided into eight lanes: three main lanes, four for exiting vehicles, and one for bicycles and pedicabs. The road also forms part of National Route 170 (N170) of the Philippine highway network and Radial Road 7 (R-7) of Metro Manila's arterial road network.

== History ==
Street sign of Elliptical Road since 2019

The earliest known plan involving the roundabout is seen on the first version of Frost Plan, the original urban plan for Quezon City, approved in 1941. It is located northeast of the formerly proposed 400-hectare (990-acre) Diliman Quadrangle within the former Diliman Estate, also known as Hacienda de Tuason, purchased by the Philippine Commonwealth government in 1939 as the new capital to replace Manila. It was originally planned to circumscribe the National Capitol grounds that would have housed the Philippine Legislature.

However, the capitol's construction was interrupted during World War II and would later be scrapped in favor of the Quezon Memorial Circle, built in honor of the late President Manuel L. Quezon.

== Junctions ==
The Quezon Memorial Circle, a park enclosed within the Elliptical Road.

In counterclockwise: The entire route is located in Quezon City.

km	mi	Destinations	Notes
		N170 (Commonwealth Avenue)	Access to Matandang Balara, Novaliches, Fairview, Lagro, San Mateo, and nearby areas.
		Visayas Avenue	Access to Project 6 & 8, Tandang Sora, Congressional and Mindanao Avenues.
		N173 (North Avenue)	Access to Projects 6 to 8, Balintawak & Monumento via AH26 (EDSA), Novaliches and North Caloocan via Mindanao Avenue.
		N170 (Quezon Avenue)	Access to AH26 (EDSA), Manila, South and West Triangles, San Francisco del Monte, and nearby areas.
		N174 (East Avenue)	Access to Cubao, Kamuning and Kamias via AH26 (EDSA), and South Triangle.
		Kalayaan Avenue	Access to Cubao, Teachers' Village, Sikatuna, Kamias, and Projects 2 to 4.
		Maharlika Street	Alternate access to UP Village and Teachers' Village.
1.000 mi = 1.609 km; 1.000 km = 0.621 mi

== Landmarks ==
Starting from Visayas Avenue, counterclockwise:

- Department of Agriculture
- Ninoy Aquino Parks and Wildlife Center
- Lung Center of the Philippines
- National Kidney and Transplant Institute
- Quezon City Hall
- National Housing Authority (Philippines)
- Philippine Coconut Authority
- Department of Agrarian Reform

Circumbscribed within the Elliptical Road is the Quezon Memorial Circle and Memorial Shrine

== See also ==
- Triangle Park
- Major roads in Metro Manila
- Quezon Memorial Circle
