= Philam, Quezon City =

Barangay in Quezon City, Metro Manila, Philippines

Philam Philam Homes
- Barangay
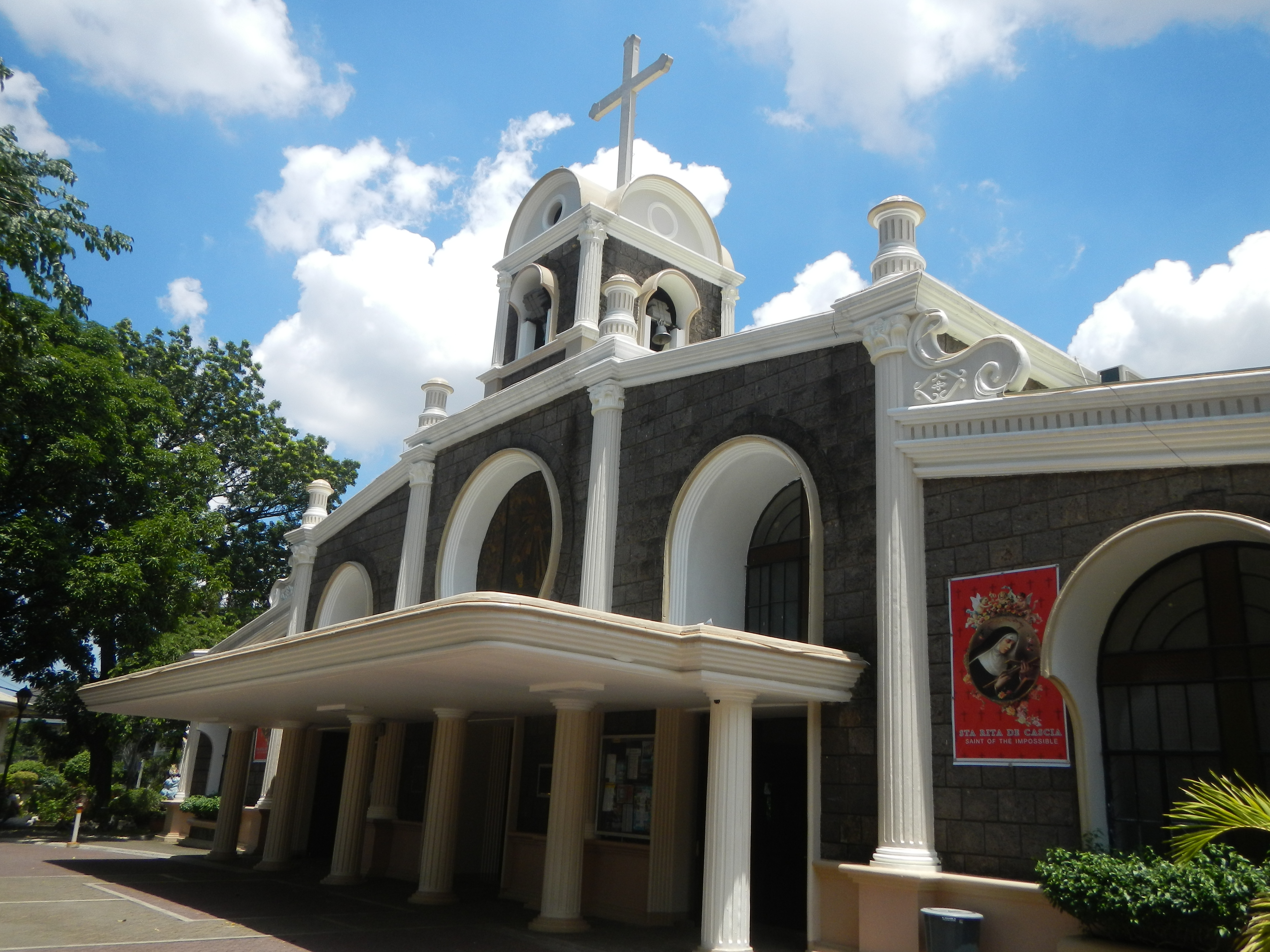
- Santa Rita de Cascia Parish Church

- Location of Barangay Philam within Metro Manila
- Coordinates: 14.6492°N 121.0314°E
- Country: Philippines
- Region: National Capital Region
- City: Quezon City
- District: 1st District of Quezon City
- Established: 1955
- Conversion to a barangay: June 25, 1975

Government
  - Type: Barangay
  - Barangay Captain: Simplicio Hermogenes

Area
  - Total: 44.68 ha (110.4 acres)

Population (2020)
  - Total: 2,524
  - Density: 5,649/km^{2} (14,630/sq mi)
- Time zone: UTC+8 (PST)
- Postal Code: 1104
- Area code: 2
- Website: Facebook

Philam, also known as Philam Homes, Philamlife Homes, or Phil-Am, is an urban barangay in Quezon City, Metro Manila, Philippines. It is located in the first legislative district of Quezon City, consisting entirely of the Philam private subdivision and gated community.

It is bounded by EDSA to the northeast, West Avenue on the northwest, and the Anaran Creek to the south. It shares a boundary with barangays Bagong Pag-Asa to the northeast, Bungad to the northwest, Paltok to the southwest, and West Triangle to the south.

== History ==
On July 17, 1948, president Elpidio Quirino signed Republic Act No. 333, designating Quezon City as the new capital of the Philippines. The following year, the 1949 Master Plan for Quezon City was published to serve as the foremost guideline in transforming the city as a “a real Filipino metropolis” and a “showplace of the nation.” Although aspects of the 1949 Master Plan were not fully implemented, a portion of the West Triangle area of the Diliman Quadrangle was purchased as a residential zone. The entire Diliman Quadrangle was initially zoned as an area exclusively for park facilities and recreational activities. This triangular-shaped residential zone was purchased by the Philippine American Life Insurance Company (Philam Life; now AIA Philippines).

=== Philam Homes ===
The purchase of this residential zone involved a 40 hectares (99 acres) cogon‐covered tract of land, bounded by West Avenues and Highway 54 (now known as EDSA). Then headed by an American philanthropist named Earl Carroll, the Philam Life developed the area into a gated residential subdivision meant to cater for "moderate‐income executives and their families". The area was patterned after American suburbia in terms of architecture and urban design. The first phase of development and launching of this residential project was set on May 15, 1955. This residential enclave was to be called, “Philam Homes.” Although the initial lots were offered to Philam Life employees, non-employees were later offered to purchase lots within community.

The urban development and master plan of Philam Homes was designed by the Harvard educated architect Angel Nakpil. The various house models were designed by renowned Filipino architect Carlos Arguelles.

The residential master plan for Philam Homes offered an initial 605 residential lots with areas between 400 and 500 m^{2} (4,300 and 5,400 sq ft). At the center of the residential area was a 6,000 m^{2} (65,000 sq ft) amenities center, which includes a football field, a basketball court, a tennis ball court, a swimming pool, and a clubhouse for residents. A large park, named Earl Carroll Park, is the main amenity of the community. A community chapel was also built in this center, which was later instated as a parish church on June 2, 1957. This parish is now known as the Santa Rita de Cascia Parish Church.

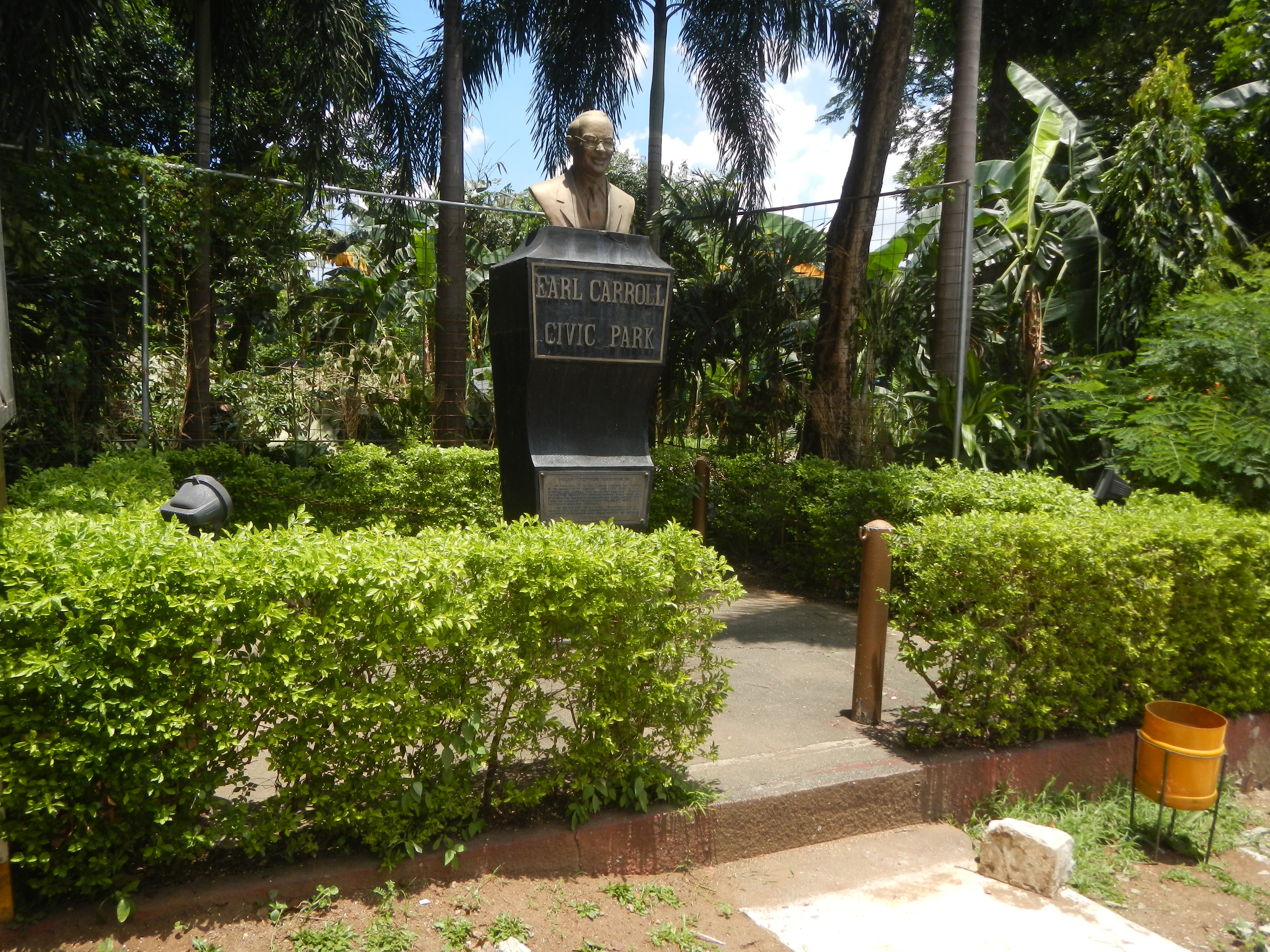
A bust of Earl Carroll as a memorial in the civic park named after him

The center also had its own grocery in 1955, known as Jopson's Supermarket. This grocery was owned by the family of renown labor rights activist and former resident, Edgar Jopson. Later on, Jopson's Supermarket in Philam was to be sold off in 1958 and renamed as Nati's Nook.

=== Barangay established ===
By 1976, Philam Homes was converted as a barangay, a small administrative division. Philam Homes as a barangay was designated as "Barangay Philam" with then-mayor Norberto Amoranto appointing Phil-Am Homeowners Association (PHAI) president Arsenio D. Narcisso as Philam's first barangay captain. A barangay hall with a space allocated for a fire truck and emergency equipment was erected within the subdivision grounds and were funded privately by association dues.

== Government ==
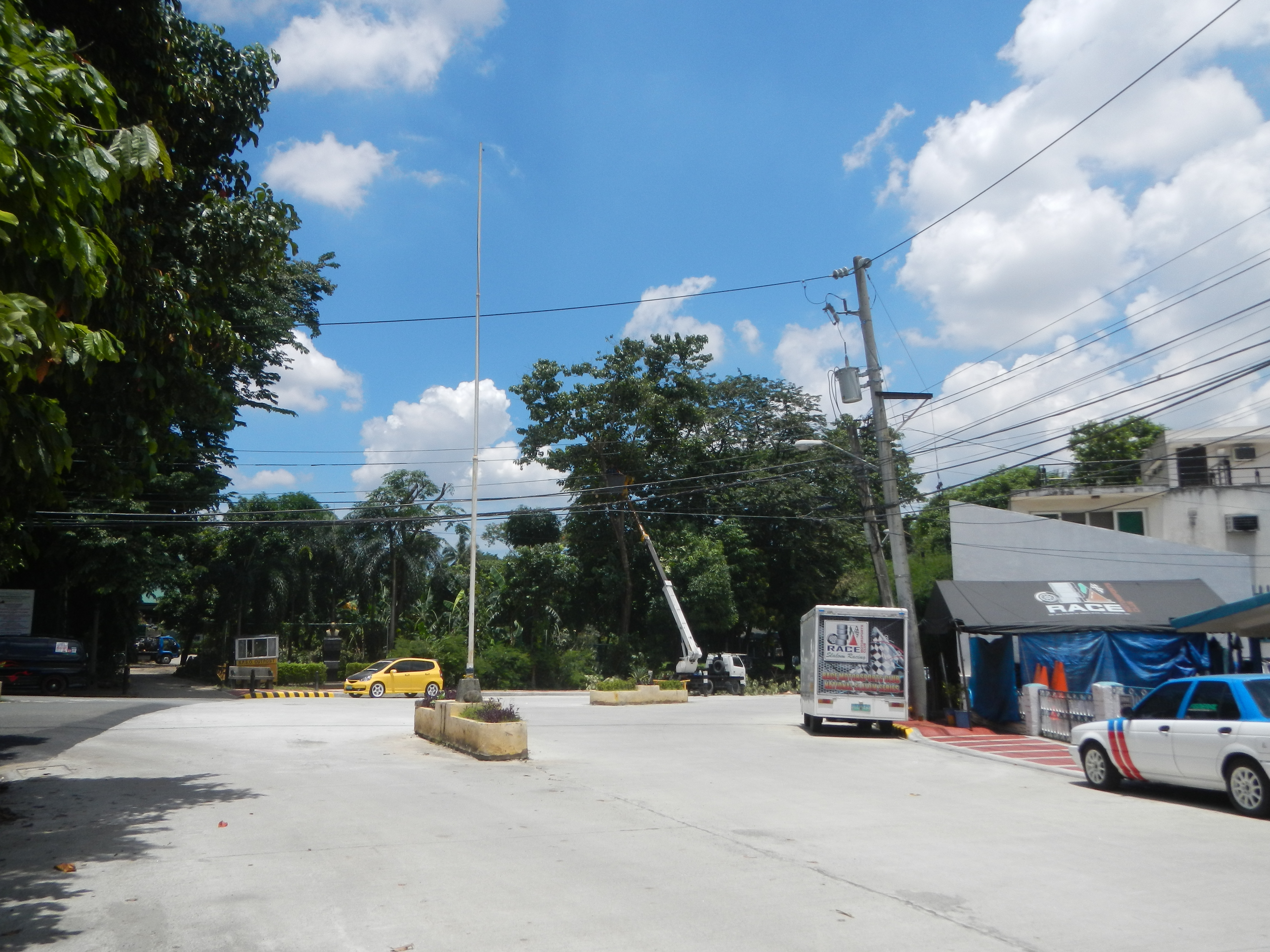
Earl Carroll Civic Park as seen from a wide road in Philam Homes

As a barangay, Philam is governed by an elected barangay captain. Since 2019, the elected barangay captain of Philam Homes is Simplicio Hermogenes. Alongside the barangay government, the Philam Homeowners Association help in the security and maintenance of the community and all of its amenities. Being a gated community, entry into the barangay and other surveillance features is maintained by private security personnel managed by the Philam Homeowners Association. The barangay government and the homeowners association are based in the Clubhouse Complex along Baguio Road, Philam Homes, Quezon City.

== Demographics ==
Barangay Philam is the 121st most-populated barangay in Quezon City, with a population of 2,524 people according to the 2020 census, down from a population of 2,673 people in the 2015 census.

== Issues ==
A concern for many residents of the barangay is the growing gentrification and deteriorating traffic situation surrounding Philam. The worsening pollution and road congestion is affecting quality of life of the barangay. Mostly affected are elderly residents who have lived in Philam since its establishment in 1955.

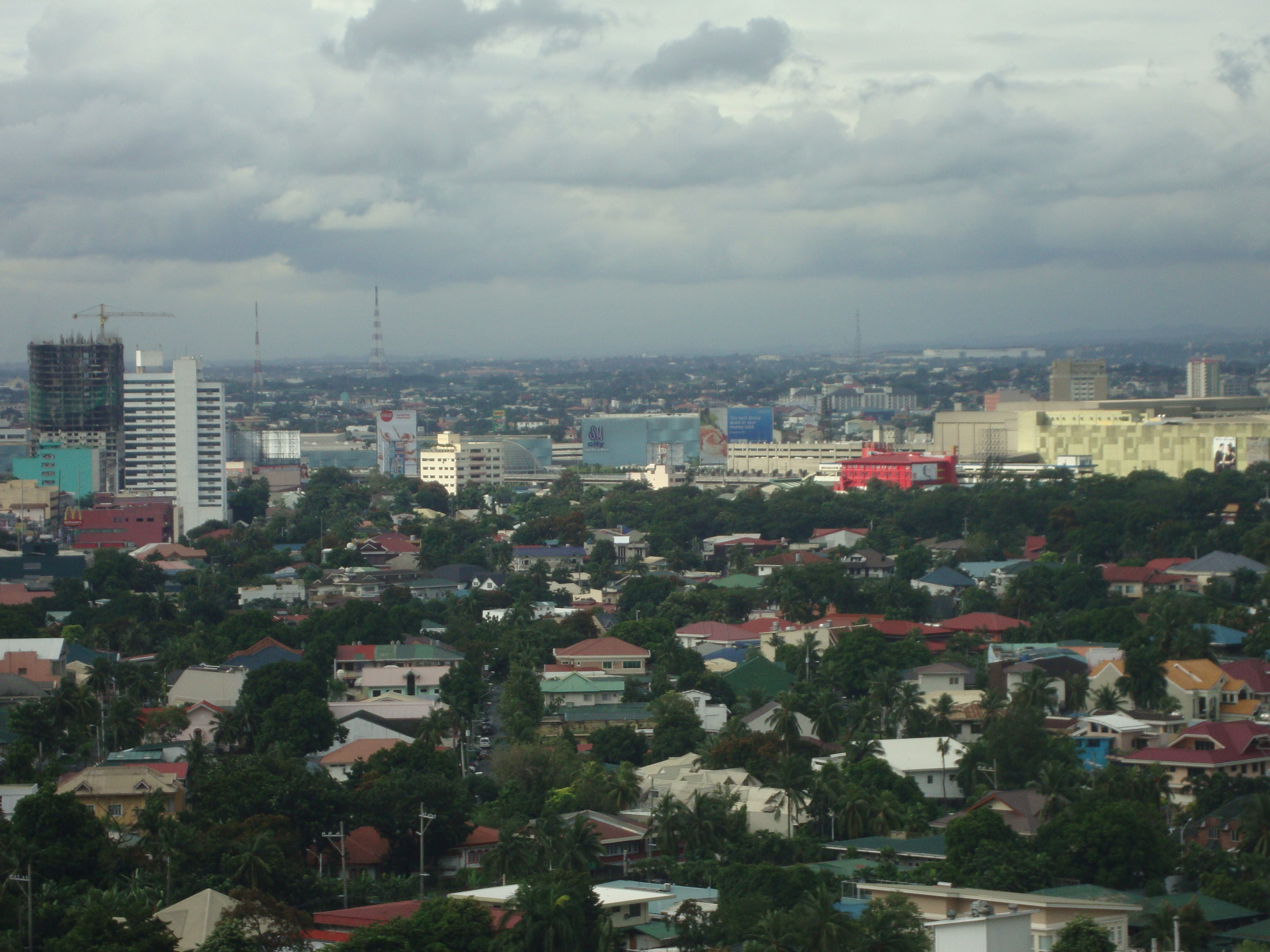
Massive gentrification, pollution and traffic are some of the issues that are affecting the Philam community

Another concern for many residents in 2019 was the pruning done to the trees in Earl Carroll Civic Park. Many residents expressed concern on the number of trees pruned in the park. The barangay government stated that the pruning was necessary as a “precaution [against] potential damage to [property]” in the area. Many of the trees remain standing and healthy.
