= Timog Avenue =

Road in Quezon City, Philippines

Coordinates: 14°38′05″N 121°02′06″E

Timog Avenue
- South Avenue
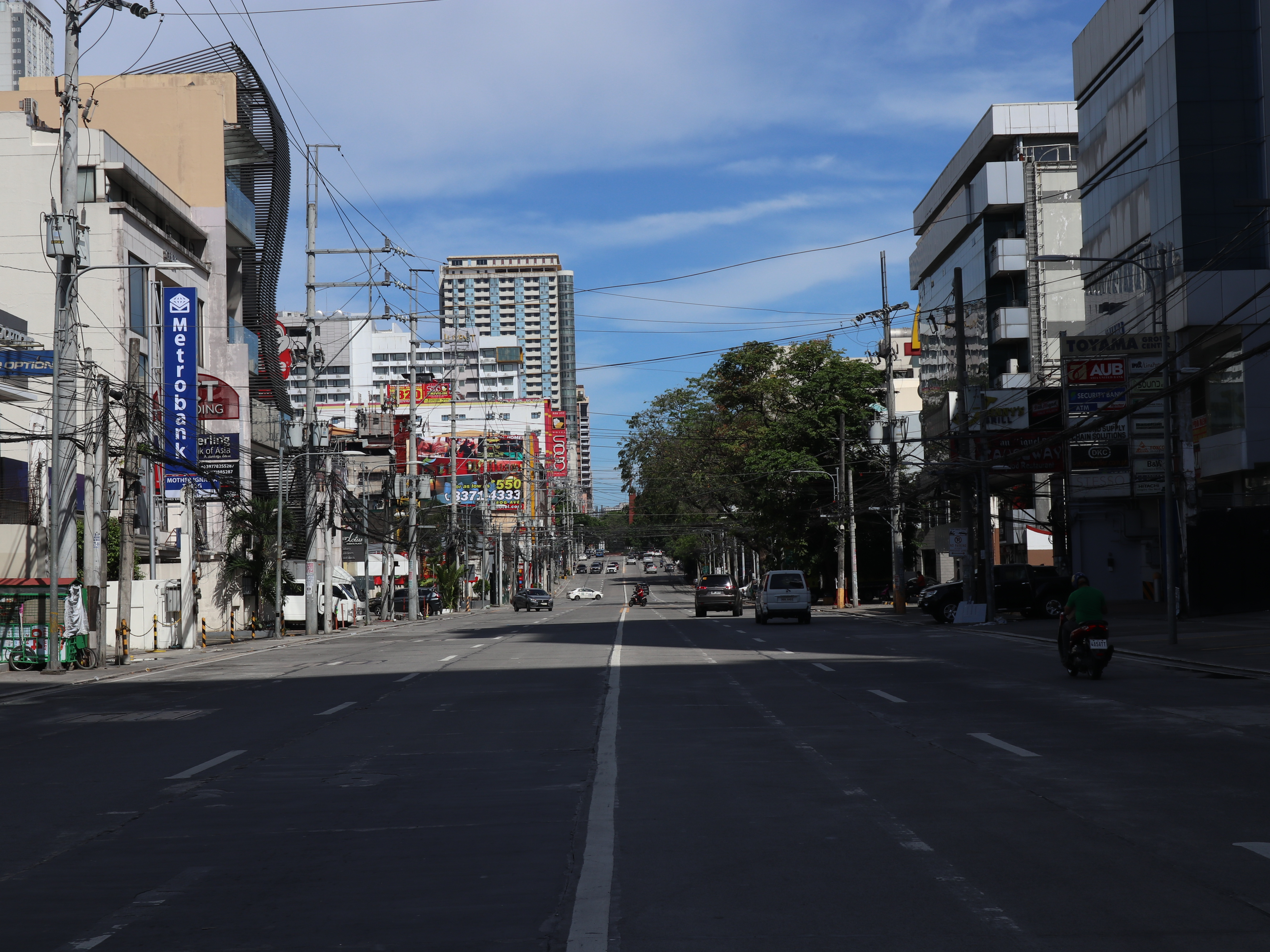
- Timog Avenue-Scout Tobias Street, Quezon City

Route information
- Maintained by the Department of Public Works and Highways – Quezon City 2nd Engineering District Office
- Length: 2.040 km (1.268 mi)

Major junctions
- West end: N170 (Quezon Avenue)
- East end: AH 26 (N1) (EDSA)

Location
- Country: Philippines
- Major cities: Quezon City

Highway system
- Roads in the Philippines; Highways; Expressways; List
← N171	→ N173

Timog Avenue (formerly known as South Avenue) is a major road located in Quezon City within the Diliman area of northeastern Metro Manila, Philippines. It runs east–west through the southern edge of the barangay of South Triangle. The street is within Quezon City's entertainment area, known for its trendy restaurants, bars, and karaoke and comedy clubs. It is also home to the GMA Network Center studios on the avenue's junction with Epifanio de los Santos Avenue (EDSA). The entire avenue is designated National Route 172 (N172) of the Philippine highway network.

== Route description ==
Timog Avenue is a four-lane road at the heart of Quezon City's entertainment district. It begins at its junction with EDSA south of East Avenue by South Triangle's border with the central Diliman village of Pinyahan. It heads west from this junction to cross GMA Network Drive and Sergeant Esguerra Avenue towards the 11th World Scout Jamboree Memorial Rotonda on the intersection with Tomas Morato Avenue. Located on or near this eastern section of Timog are the GMA studios, Kamuning MRT station, Go Hotels, and Imperial Palace Suites Hotel. After crossing the Boy Scout circle, the avenue is dominated by more commercial establishments, including The Shoppes at Victoria, which houses a Robinsons Supermarket, Luxent Hotel (positioned as an upscale Business and Family-friendly hotel), Torre Venezia and the Toyama Center. Located in this western section are many popular restaurants, comedy clubs, and cosmetic salons which cater to local actors working in nearby studios. The avenue terminates at the junction with Quezon Avenue south of West Avenue near West Triangle.

== History ==
Timog Avenue was formerly known as South Avenue before it was renamed to its Tagalog translation.

The avenue forms the southern boundary of the formerly proposed 400-hectare (990-acre) Diliman Quadrangle within the former Diliman Estate, also known as Hacienda de Tuason, purchased by the Philippine Commonwealth government in 1939 as the new capital to replace Manila. It was originally planned as the new city's Central Park, housing the new national government buildings (the new presidential palace, Capitol Building, and Supreme Court complex) within the 25-hectare (62-acre) elliptical site now known as the Quezon Memorial Circle, according to the Frost Plan. The quadrangle is surrounded by North (Hilaga) Avenue to the north, East (Silangan) Avenue to the east, Timog (South) Avenue to the south, and West (Kanluran) Avenue to the west. The Diliman Quadrangle had been largely undeveloped for decades due to lack of funding. After several revisions, the government planners moved the city center to Novaliches due to its higher elevation.

On April 24, 1964, the Quezon City Council renamed streets in the area commemorating the delegates of the 11th World Scout Jamboree who died in a plane crash en route to the event held in Greece the previous year. With this, it was to be renamed Boy Scouts Avenue, but the government disagreed. By 1976, the country's capital had been transferred back to Manila, with only the Quezon Memorial built on the supposed capitol site. In 1984, the avenue, alongside East Avenue, was renamed President Carlos P. Garcia Avenue after the former president.

== Intersections ==
The entire route is located in Quezon City.

km	mi	Destinations	Notes
		N170 (Quezon Avenue)	Traffic light intersection. Western terminus. Continues as N171 (West Avenue)
		Panay Avenue	
		Mother Ignacia Avenue, Scout Santiago Street	
		Scout Tobias Street	Alternative route to E. Rodriguez Sr. Ave via Tobias—Hemady Bridge
		Scout Tuazon Street	
		Tomas Morato Avenue	11th World Scout Jamboree Memorial Rotonda
		Scout Torillo Street	
		Scout Ybardolaza Street	
		Sergeant Esguerra Avenue, 11th Jamboree Street, GMA Network Drive	Southbound goes to Kamuning Road, GMA Network Drive has access to GMA Network
		Samar Avenue	
		AH 26 (N1) (EDSA)	Traffic light intersection. Eastern terminus. Continues as N174 (East Avenue)
1.000 mi = 1.609 km; 1.000 km = 0.621 mi
