= 11th World Scout Jamboree Memorial Rotonda =

Roundabout in the Philippines

- Boy Scout Circle
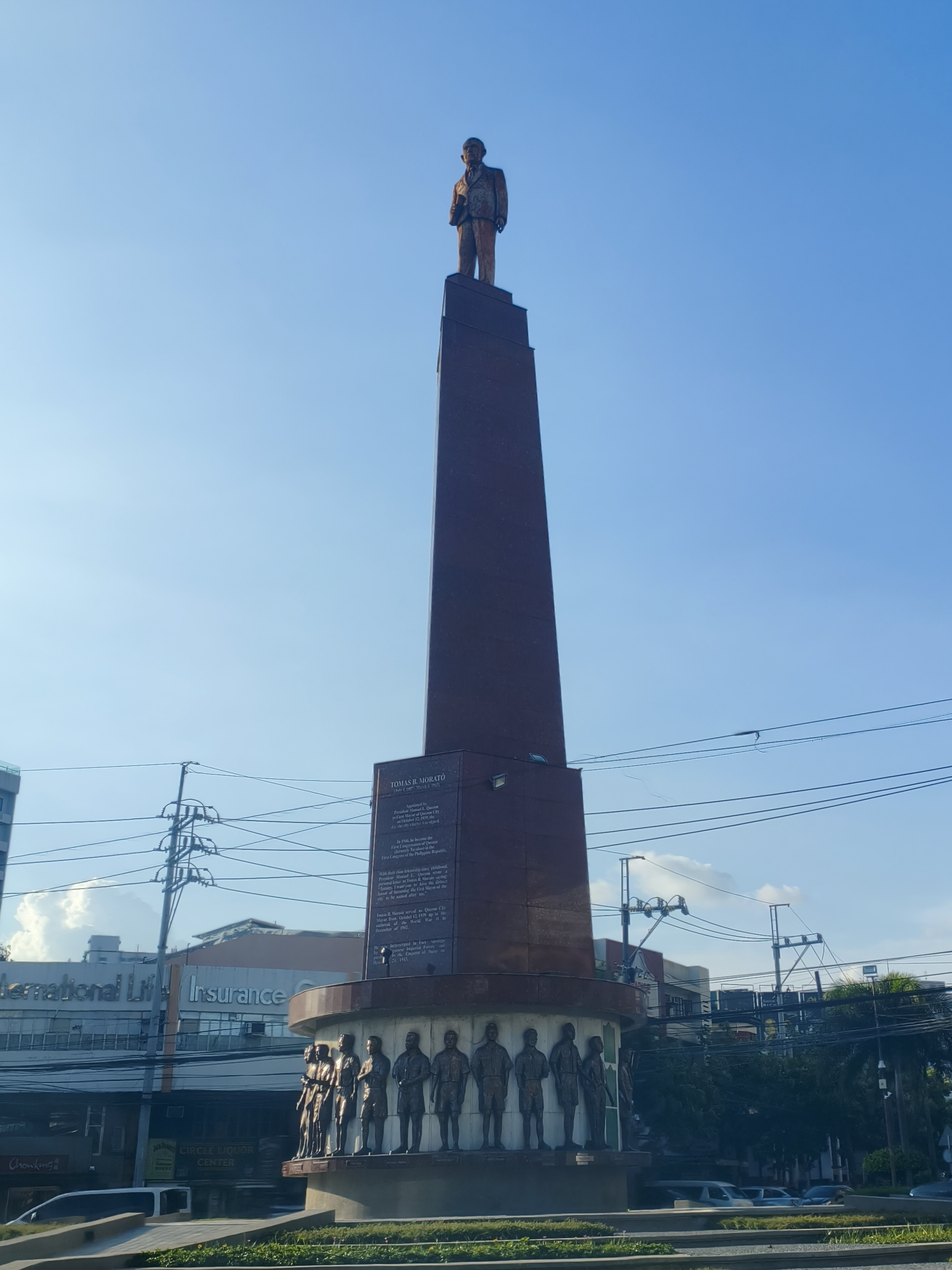
- The 11th World Scout Jamboree Memorial Rotonda statue taken in July 18, 2026
- Interactive map of 11th World Scout Jamboree Memorial Rotonda

Location
- Quezon City, Metro Manila, Philippines
- Coordinates: 14°38′5.5″N 121°2′7.97″E
- Roads at junction: N172 (Timog Avenue); Tomas Morato Avenue

Construction
- Type: Roundabout
- Opened: 1965
- Maintained by: Department of Public Works and Highways

The 11th World Scout Jamboree Memorial Rotonda (also known as the Boy Scout Circle) is a roundabout in Quezon City, Metro Manila, Philippines. Located at the intersection between Timog and Tomas Morato Avenues, it serves as the boundary between barangays South Triangle, Laging Handa and Sacred Heart.

A monument stands in the middle of the roundabout, which commemorates the members of the ill-fated Philippine contingent to the 11th World Scout Jamboree that was among the casualties of the United Arab Airlines Flight 869 crash of 1963. The monument consists of a circular pedestal with bronze statues in the likenesses of the 24 members of the Philippine delegation (22 Boy Scouts, two veteran Scouters, and two chaperons) positioned around the structure.

The statues were sculpted by Florante Beltran Caedo. The monument was unveiled to the public by then-Mayor Norberto S. Amoranto in 1965 at the intersections of Sampaloc and South Avenues (now Tomas Morato and Timog Avenues, respectively). In 2007, the Quezon City government performed a ₱20 million renovation on the monument that included the addition of an obelisk on top of the structure honoring Tomás Morató, the first mayor of Quezon City and after whom the Tomas Morato Avenue is named.

== Tragedy ==
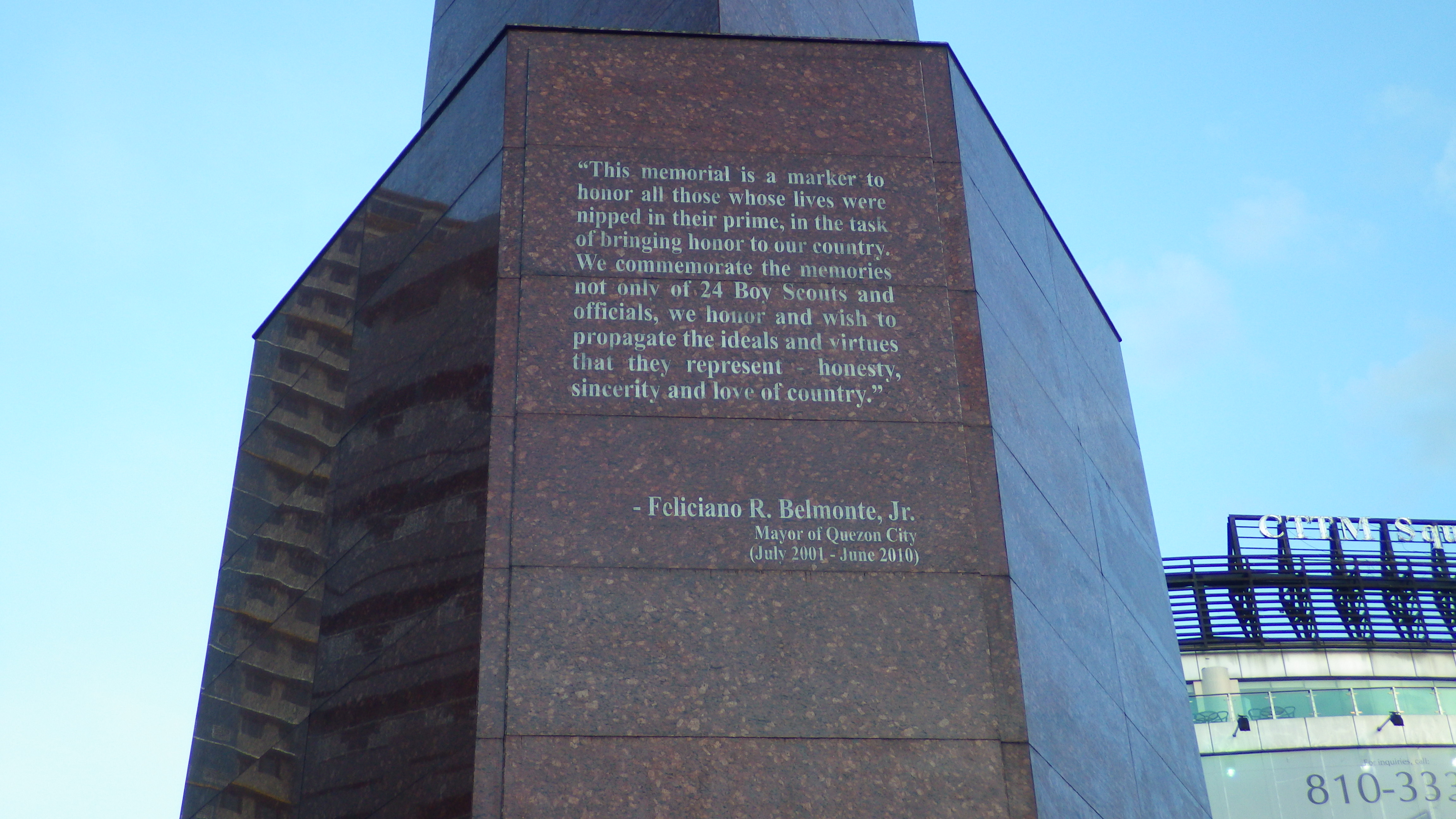
Memorial marker

Flags at the Jamboree were placed at half-mast in mourning after the bulk of the Boy Scouts of the Philippines contingent died in the crash of United Arab Airlines Flight 869 (1963) at 0150 hours on July 28, 1963, in the Arabian Sea, nine nautical miles from Madh Island, Bombay (now Mumbai), India.

One Scout from the Agusan Council, Alex Kwan, completed the pre-jamboree training and was scheduled to attend but was told days before the departure date that he would not be able to attend because of problems securing a passport. Nevertheless, the BSP sent a token delegation of three Scouts to Marathon some days after the crash, in addition to several BSP officials who had arrived in Greece ahead of the accident.

On behalf of the parents of the Scouts, Antonio C. Delgado, father of Scout Jose Antonio Delgado (and later Chairman of the World Scout Conference, 1971–1973), gave a response during the state memorial service weeks after the crash: "For this is the other side of the coin of grief. The glory. The honor. The triumph... In the forefront of these boy's minds were always held as shining goals the noble ideals of the Scout Oath: 'honor... duty... God... Country.' These boys kept their honor; and they kept the faith; and they gave their all for their country... and I am sure they kept themselves in the friendship of God."

== Surrounding buildings and structures ==
The monument and some surrounding structures

The area around the 11th World Scout Jamboree Memorial Rotonda is largely made up of dining and entertainment establishments. Tomas Morato Avenue is known for its large variety of restaurants, concentrated along the stretch to the southwest of the roundabout. Near the northeast corner was the site of the 1996 Ozone Disco Club fire.
