= Quezon Avenue =

Major road in Quezon City, Philippines

Coordinates: 14°38′6″N 121°1′23″E

R-7 Quezon Avenue
- Quezon Ave; Q Ave
- Map of Quezon Avenue in Metro Manila

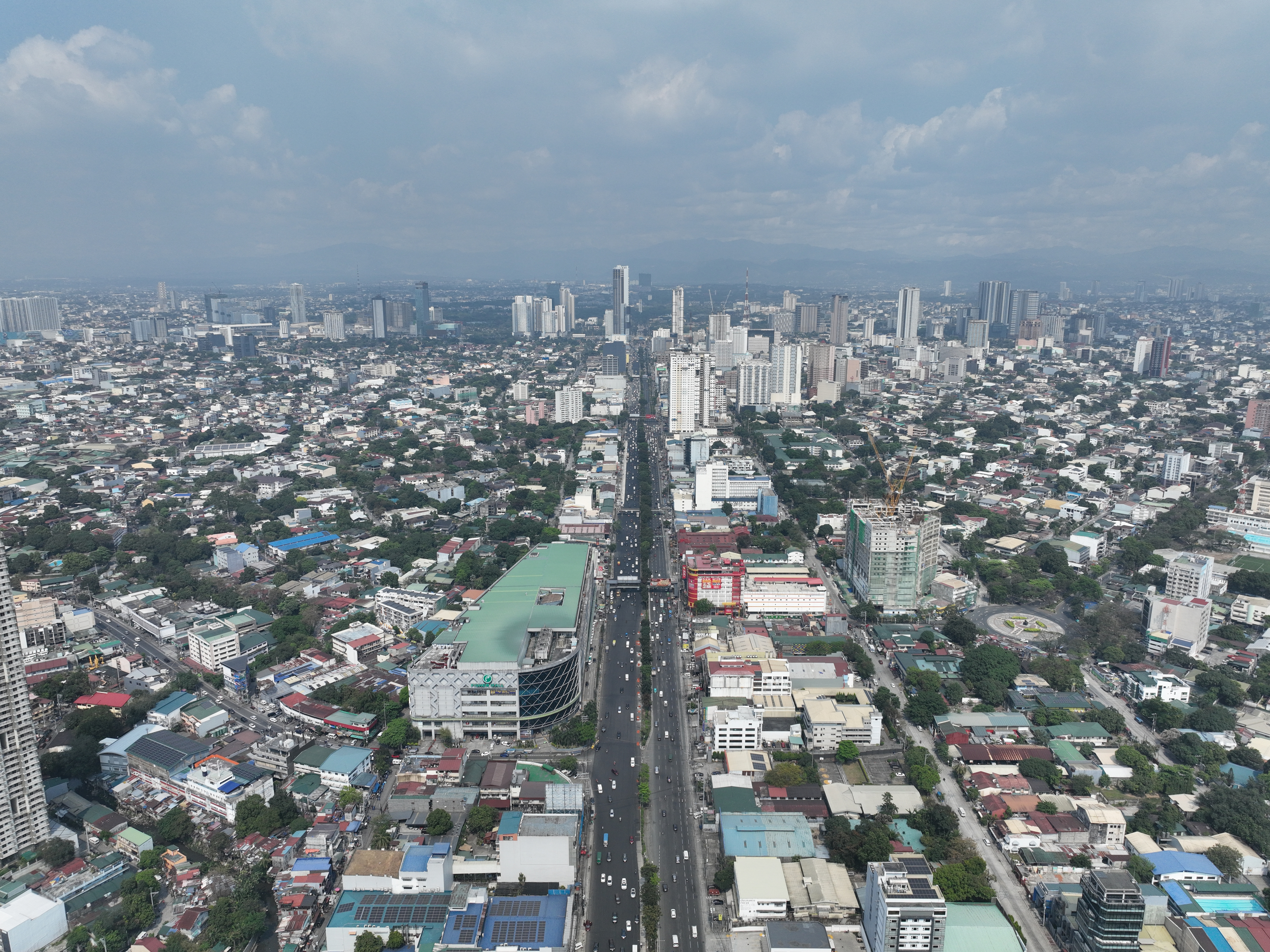
- Aerial view of Quezon Avenue (2026)

Route information
- Maintained by the Department of Public Works and Highways
- Length: 6.1 km (3.8 mi)
- Component highways: R-7 R-7; N170

Major junctions
- Northeast end: N170 (Elliptical Road)
- AH 26 (N1) (EDSA); N171 (West Avenue) / N172 (Timog Avenue); Fernando Poe Jr. Avenue; N130 (Gregorio Araneta Avenue)
- Southwest end: Welcome Rotonda

Location
- Country: Philippines
- Major cities: Quezon City

Highway system
- Roads in the Philippines; Highways; Expressways; List

Manuel L. Quezon Avenue, more often called Quezon Avenue or simply Quezon Ave, is a 6.1-kilometer (3.8 mi) major thoroughfare in Metro Manila named after President Manuel Luis Quezon, the second president of the Philippines. The avenue starts at the Quezon Memorial Circle and runs through to the Welcome Rotonda near the boundary of Quezon City and Manila.

Lined with palm trees and other species of tree on its center island and spanning six to fourteen lanes, it is a major north-south and east-west corridor of Quezon City. Many government and commercial buildings line the road. At its north end, Triangle Park, one of Quezon City's Central Business Districts, is the third most important industrial center in the city. At its south end, it connects Quezon City to the capital Manila. It is a regular route for vehicles from Quezon City leading to Manila, as the highway provides access to Quiapo and the University Belt.

== History ==
The avenue was developed as part of a road plan to connect the government center of Manila in Rizal Park to the proposed new capital on the Diliman Estate. It was also referred to as Quezon Boulevard Extension, Calle España, and Malawen Boulevard. During World War II, its section in Diliman Estate served as a runway of the Quezon Airfield, along with the Manila Circumferential Road (now EDSA).

The road, much like Commonwealth Avenue, was then named Don Mariano Marcos Avenue to honor Mariano Marcos, the father of President Ferdinand Marcos. The road was renamed Quezon Avenue after former president Manuel Quezon following the 1986 People Power Revolution with the ascension of Corazon Aquino as president. It originally started at EDSA, but the portion between the Elliptical Road and EDSA, which used to be named Commonwealth Avenue extension, became a part of the road. With the passing of the 1987 Constitution, Quezon City had four legislative districts until two new districts were added in 2013. The west of Quezon Avenue constitutes the first district, while the east constitutes the fourth district.

=== U-turn slots ===
In 2003, after the perceived effectiveness of EDSA, Commonwealth Avenue and Marcos Highway, the Metropolitan Manila Development Authority (MMDA) implemented the "clearway scheme"; this prohibited crossings and left turns on the avenue. In place of left turns, the MMDA has constructed U-turn slots 100 to 200 meters (330 to 660 ft) away from the intersections to allow vehicles to reach their destination.

The MMDA would later backpedal on the scheme in 2014 by reverting some intersections along Quezon Avenue to traffic light-signalized ones.

=== Quezon Avenue–Araneta Avenue underpass ===
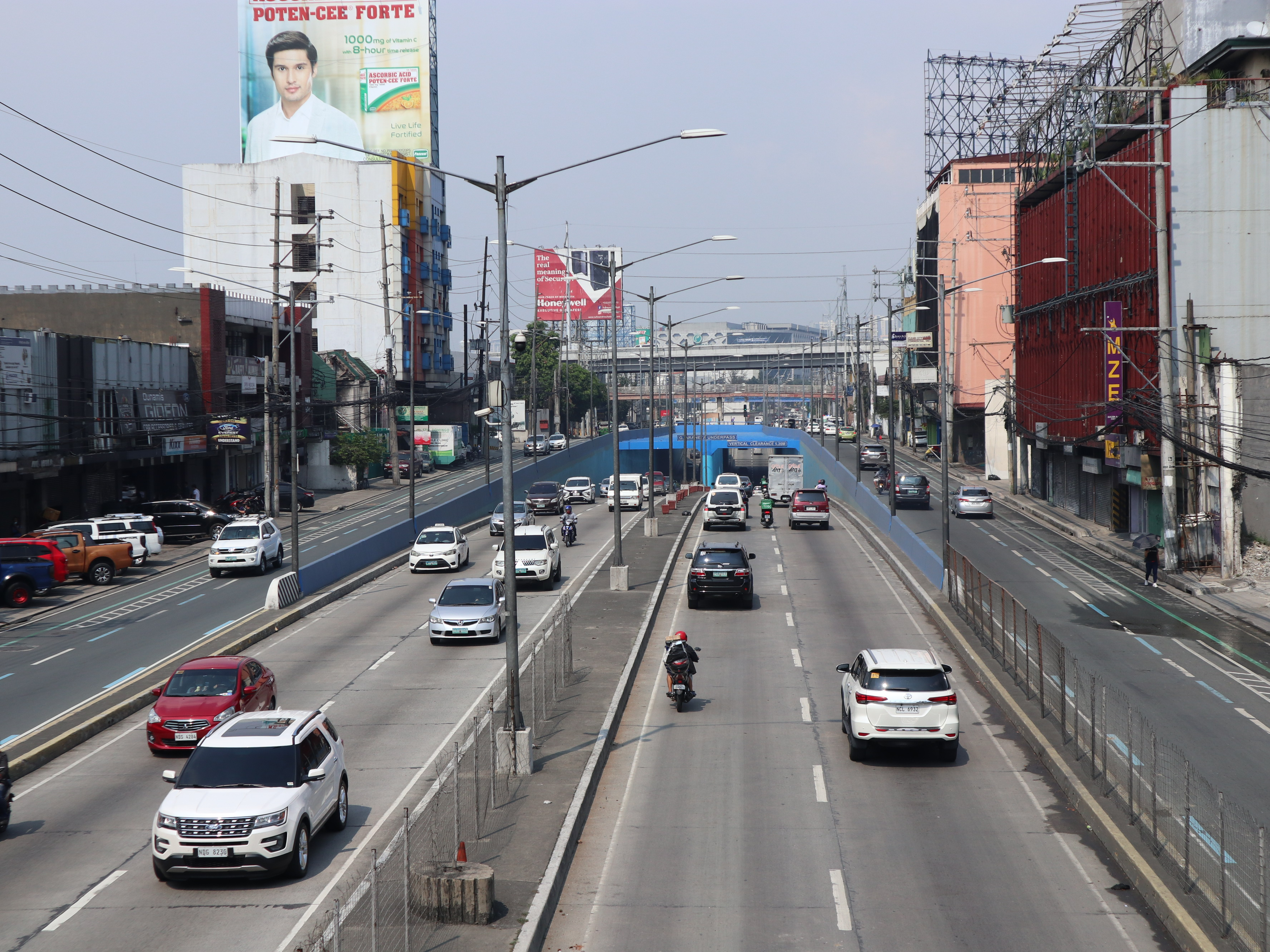
Gregorio Araneta Underpass

In June 2011, a 440-meter (1,440 ft) four-lane underpass was started along the Gregorio Araneta Avenue Intersection. The construction was slated to take up to 15 months. In September 2012, President Benigno Aquino III opened the underpass to the public. The project cost ₱452 million or below the ₱534 million budget allocated.

=== Motorcycle lanes ===
In 2012, the MMDA instituted motorcycle lanes on the avenue. The lanes are painted blue and are meant exclusively for motorcycle riders. This comes after the effectiveness of the "blue lanes" on EDSA, Commonwealth Avenue, and Macapagal Boulevard, although the blue lane on EDSA is not exclusive to motorcycles.

=== Elevated expressway ===
Initially suggested in 1993 as part of a study conducted by the Japan International Cooperation Agency, the intended elevated R-7 Expressway will traverse above the existing roads, linking the Metro Manila Skyway to Commonwealth Avenue.

=== Planned busway system (Bus Rapid Transit) ===
In 2017, the World Bank granted a loan for building a bus rapid transit line along Quezon Avenue, but this project was put on hold in 2022. In 2025, Secretary of Transportation Vince Dizon announced that Quezon Avenue and España Boulevard will be equipped with their own busway system.

== Intersections ==
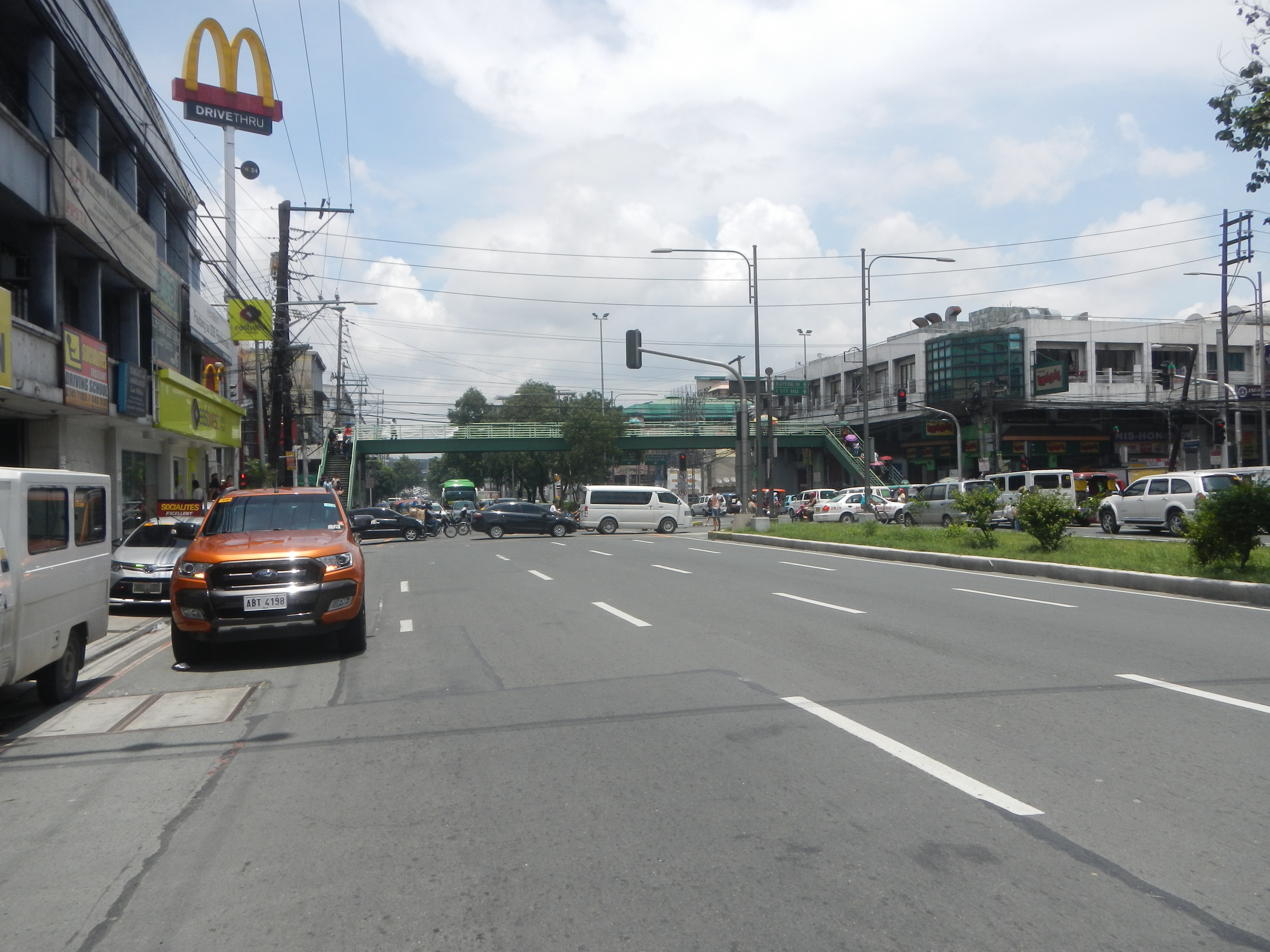
Quezon Avenue, looking north towards the Banawe Street junction in Santa Mesa Heights

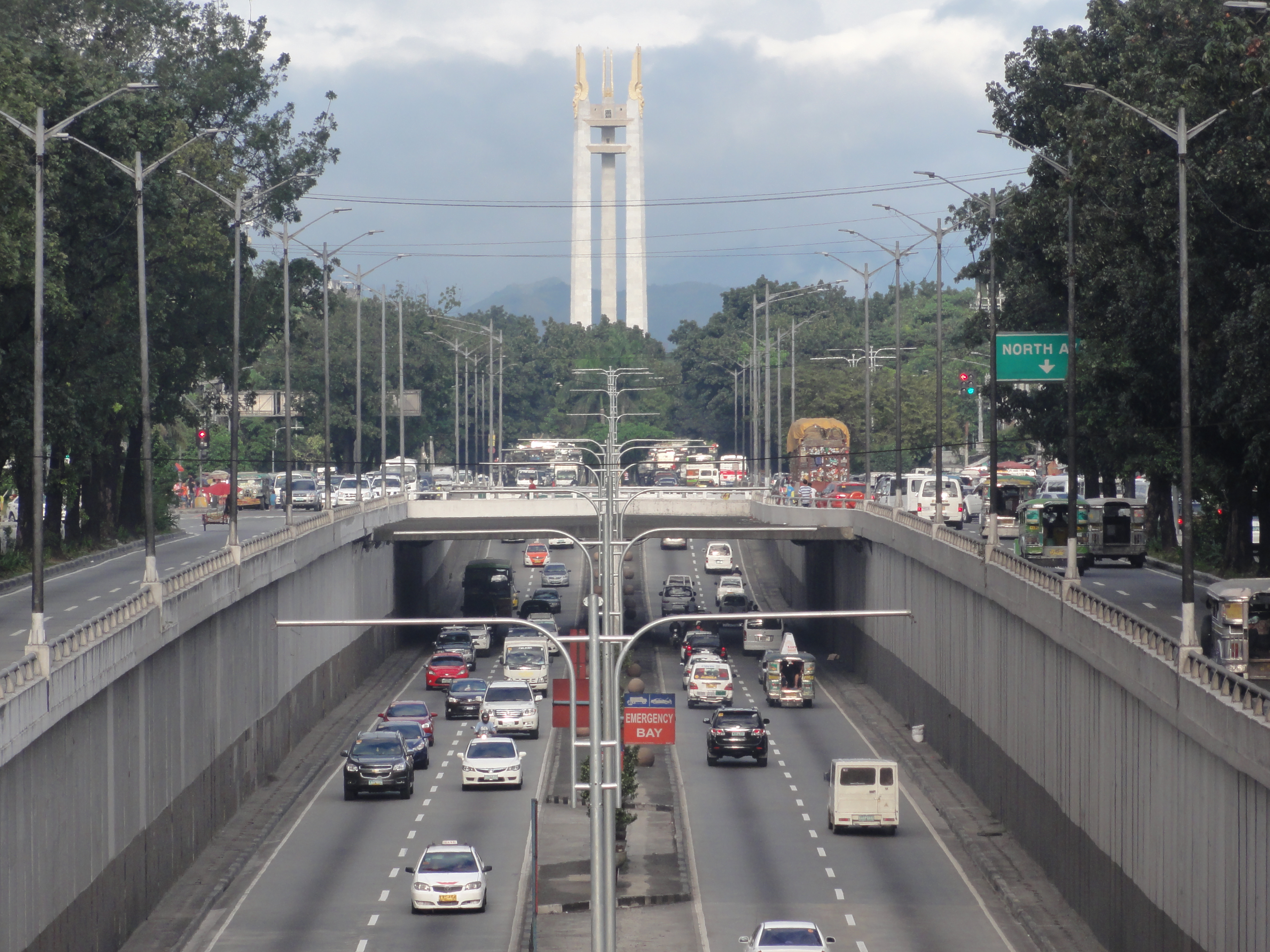
Quezon Avenue–EDSA underpass facing the Quezon Memorial Circle

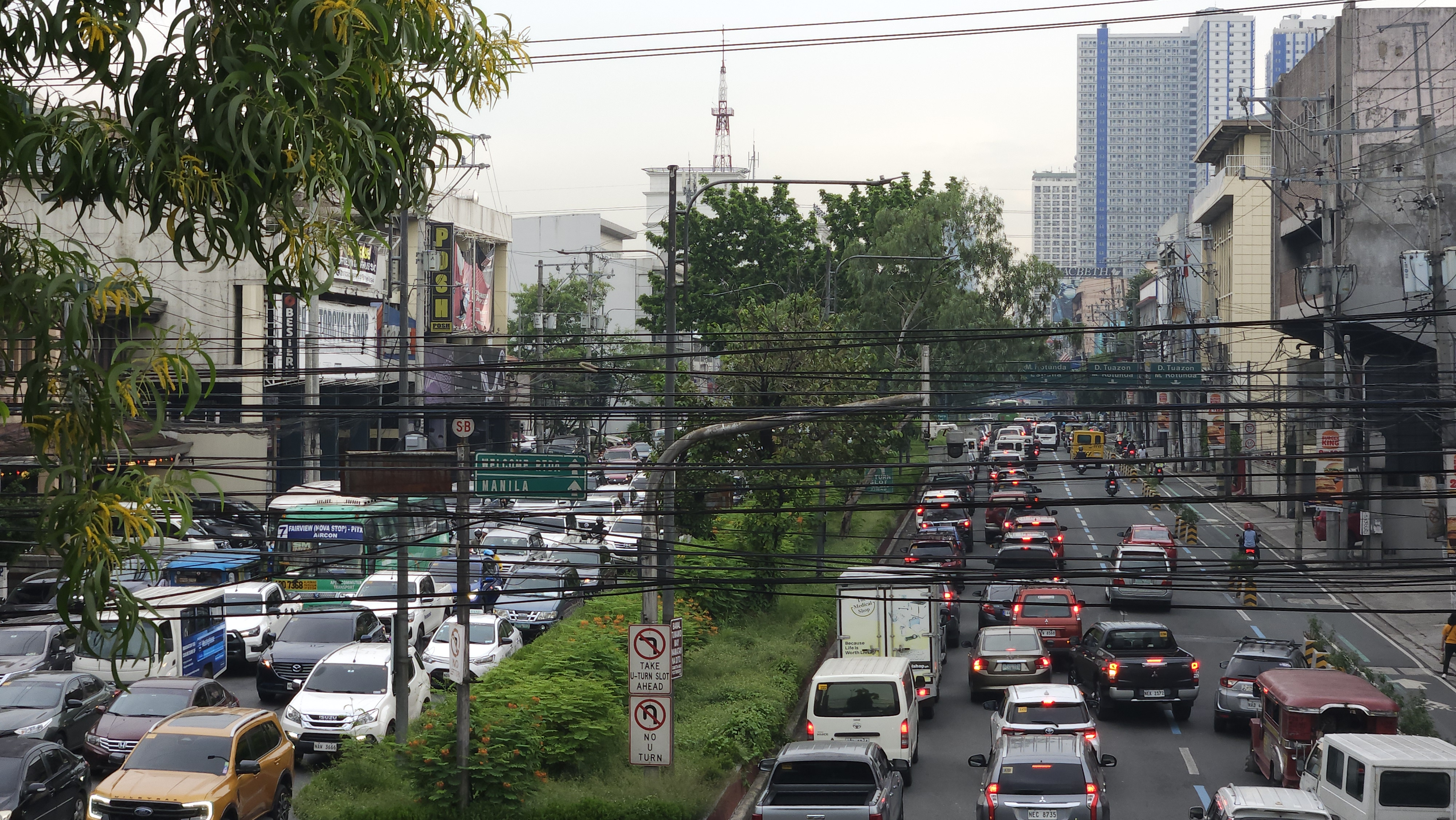
Rush hour traffic along Quezon Avenue near Banawe Street

The entire route is located in Quezon City. Intersections are numbered by kilometer post, with Rizal Park in Manila designated as kilometer zero.

km	mi	Destinations	Notes
6.529	4.057	N170 (Elliptical Road)	Northeastern terminus. Continues to Fairview as Commonwealth Avenue.
		Northeastern end of Quezon Avenue–EDSA Underpass	
		Senator Miriam P. Defensor-Santiago Avenue (formerly Agham and BIR Roads)	Accessible from service roads only. Traffic light intersection.
		AH 26 (N1) (EDSA) – Cubao, Makati, Monumento	Traffic light intersection
		Sergeant Esguerra Avenue	Accessible from service roads only. Northbound segment provides access to Timog Avenue.
		Southwestern end of Quezon Avenue–EDSA Underpass	
		Scout Albano Street/Examiner Street	Traffic light intersection. Access to West Avenue (Examiner side); access to Mo. Ignacia Ave. and Eugenio Lopez Drive (Sct. Albano side)
		Scout Borromeo Street/West 4th Street	Traffic light intersection.
		Scout Santiago Street/West 6th Street	No access from opposite directions.
		N171 (West Avenue) / N172 (Timog Avenue)	Traffic light intersection
		Jose Abad Santos Street	Southbound only
		Scout Reyes Street	Northbound only
		Scout Magbanua Street	Northbound only
		Don Alejandro Roces Avenue	Southbound access by U-turn only. Access to Tomas Morato Avenue and Kamuning Road.
		Fernando Poe Jr. Avenue (formerly Roosevelt Avenue)	Northbound access by U-turn only. Access to San Francisco del Monte and Project 7. Former traffic light intersection.
		Dr. Garcia Street	Northbound only
		General Lim Street	Southbound only
		Scout Chuatoco Street	Northbound only. Access to New Manila and E. Rodriguez Sr. Ave, Hemady Street, and Gilmore Avenue.
7.200	4.474	Quezon Avenue Bridge over San Juan River	
		Northeastern end of G. Araneta Underpass	
		N130 (Gregorio Araneta Avenue)	Traffic light intersection. No left turn allowed from both directions. Also provides access to Skyway.
		Santo Domingo Avenue	Access from southbound service road only
		Southwestern end of G. Araneta Underpass	
		Tuayan (Raymundo Familara) Street	Access from northbound service road only
		Biak na Bato Street	Southbound only
		Victory Avenue	Northbound only
		Banawe Street	Opposite segments accessible via U-turn slots. Former Traffic light intersection.
		Cordillera Street	Opposite segments accessible via U-turn slots
		D. Tuazon Street (formerly Sobriedad Street)	Traffic light intersection
		Speaker Perez Street	Southbound only
		Apo Street	Southbound only
		Kanlaon Street	Southbound only
		Kitanlad Street	Northbound only
11.547	7.175	N170 (España Boulevard) / E. Rodriguez Sr. Avenue / Mayon Street	Mabuhay Rotonda; Southwestern terminus. Continues to Quiapo as España Boulevard.
1.000 mi = 1.609 km; 1.000 km = 0.621 mi: Incomplete access

== Landmarks ==
Starting from its western terminus:

- Mabuhay Rotonda
- Ma Mon Luk's restaurant
- Santo Domingo Church
- Quezon Avenue Bridge (San Juan River)
- Fisher Mall
- Delta Theatre (Dela Merced Building, soon-to-be-converted by DMCI into a mixed-use residential project)
- Crossings Department Store and Supermarket
- Capitol Medical Center
- The Skysuites Tower
- DILG-NAPOLCOM Center
- Eton Centris
- Bantayog ng mga Bayani Center
- Quezon Avenue Station construction, Metro Manila Subway
- Balik Probinsya, Bagong Pag-asa Depot
- National Power Corporation
- National Transmission Corporation
- National Grid Corporation of the Philippines
- Philippine Children's Medical Center
- Lung Center of the Philippines
- Ninoy Aquino Parks & Wildlife Center
- Quezon Memorial Circle

== See also ==
- Commonwealth Avenue, eastern extension of Quezon Avenue starting from the Quezon Memorial Circle
- España Boulevard, western extension of Quezon Avenue starting from Mabuhay Rotonda.
- Major roads in Metro Manila
