= National Housing Authority (Philippines) =

Philippine government agency

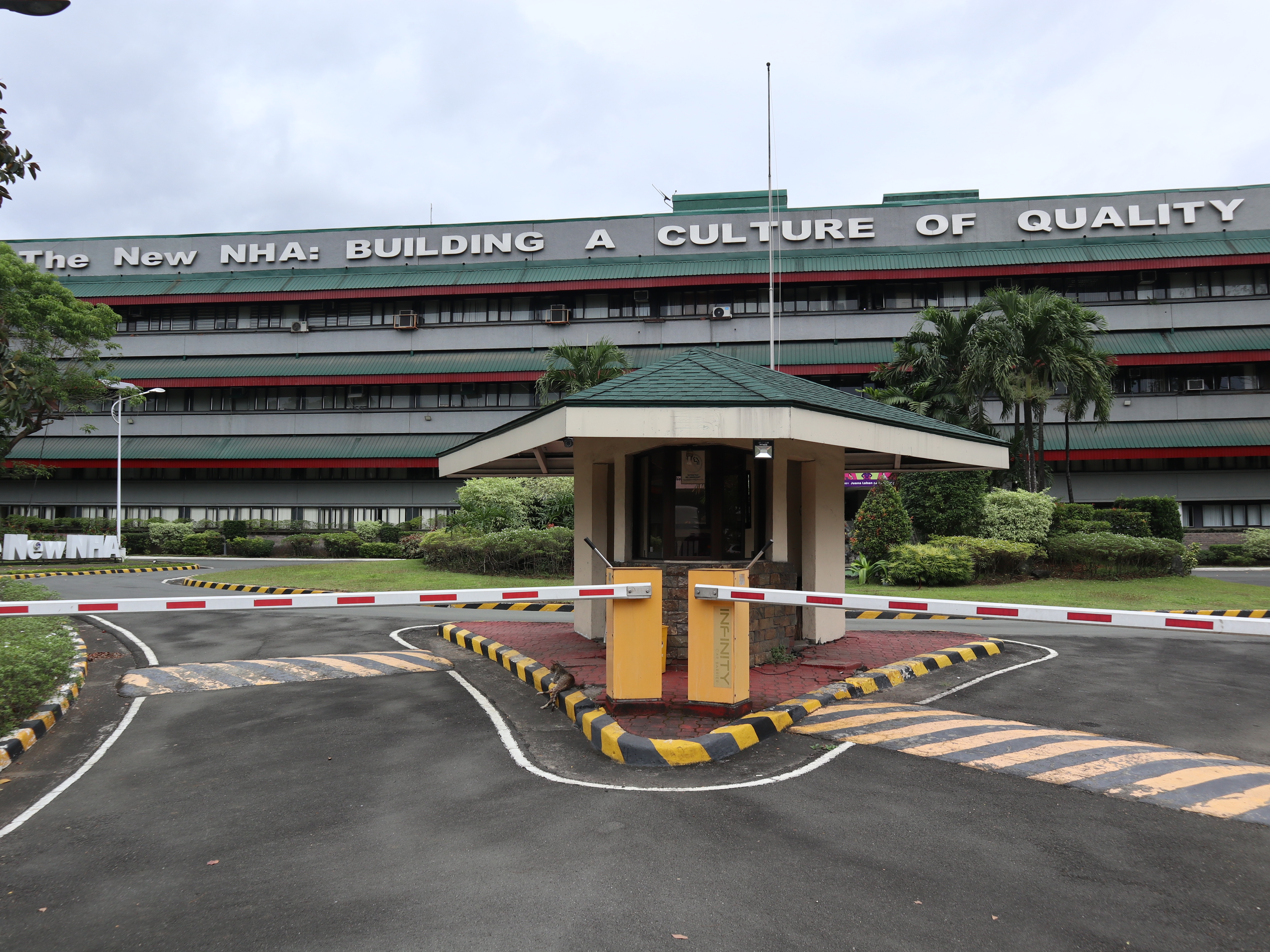

Agency overview
- Formed: July 31, 1975
- Jurisdiction: Government of the Philippines
- Headquarters: NHA Main Office, Elliptical Road, Diliman, Quezon City 1100, Philippines
- Agency executive: Joeben A. Tai, General Manager
- Parent agency: Department of Human Settlements and Urban Development
- Website: www.nha.gov.ph

The National Housing Authority (NHA; Filipino: Pambansang Pangasiwaan sa Pabahay) is a government agency responsible for public housing in the Philippines. Established on July 31, 1975, it is organized as a government-owned and controlled corporation under the Department of Human Settlements and Urban Development as an attached agency.

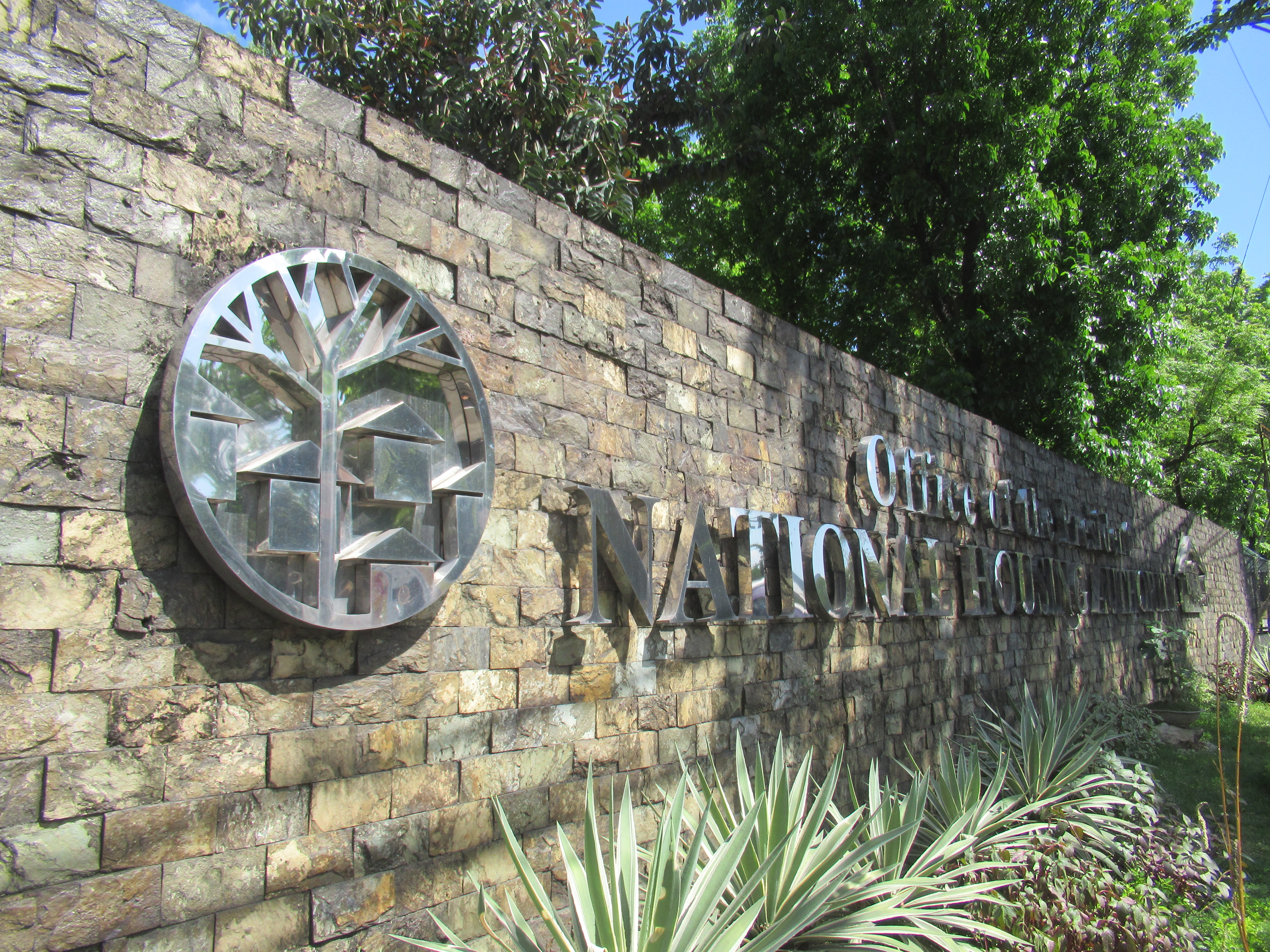
NHA gate

== List of general managers ==
- Gaudencio V. Tobias (1975–1986)
- Lito Atienza (1986–1987)
- Raymundo R. Dizon Jr. (1988–1989)
- Monico Jacob (1989–1992)
- Roberto Balao (1992–1998)
- Angelo F. Leynes (1998–2001)
- Edgardo D. Pamintuan (2001–2004)
- Federico Laxa (2004–2010)
- Chito M. Cruz (2010–2015)
- Sinforoso R. Pagunsan (2015–2016)
- Marcelino P. Escalada Jr. (2016–2022)
- Joeben A. Tai (2022–present)
