= West Avenue (Quezon City) =

Major road in Metro Manila, Philippines

West Avenue

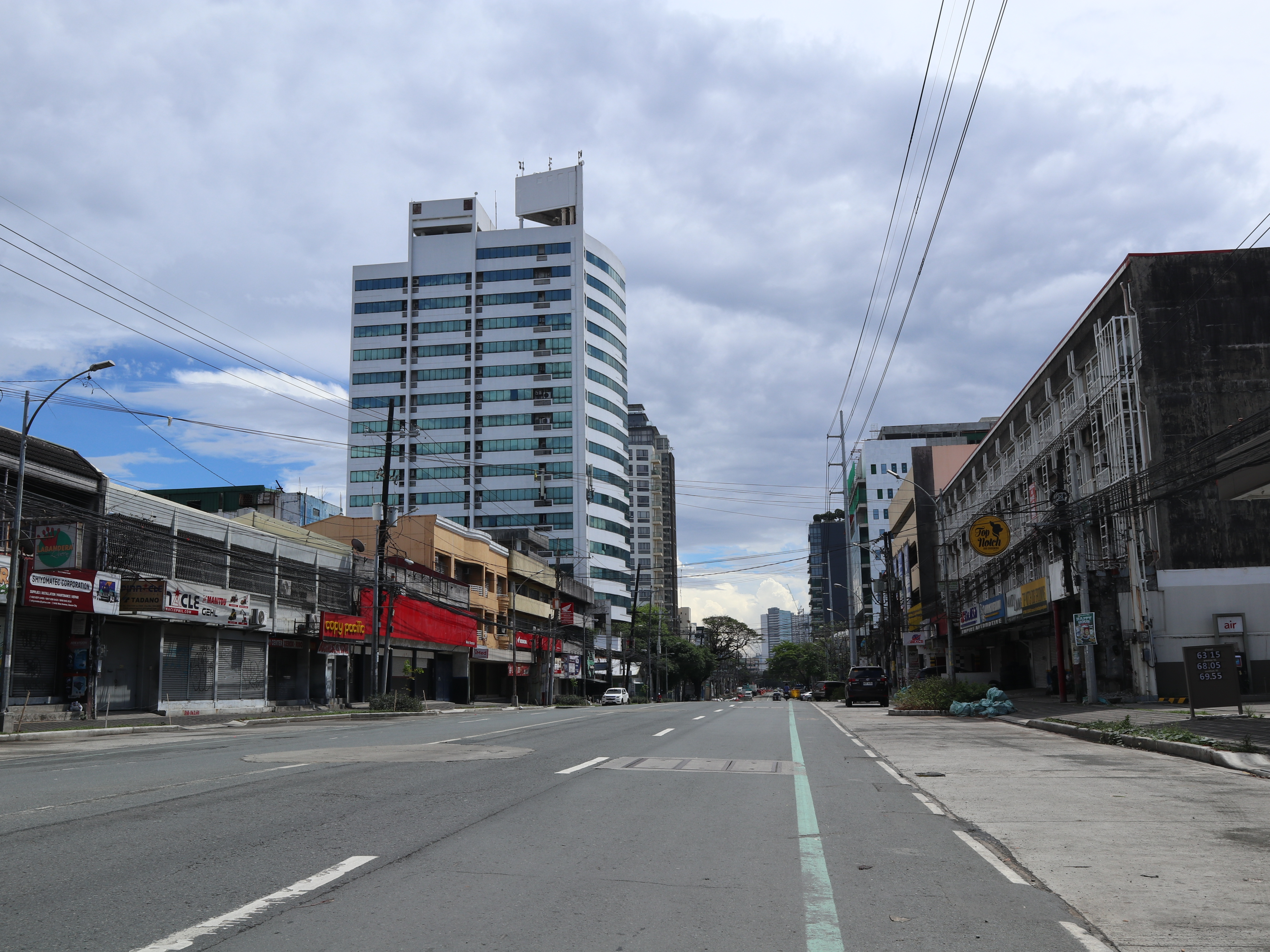
- West Avenue southbound near Philam and Veterans Village, 2024

Route information
- Maintained by Department of Public Works and Highways – Quezon City 1st Engineering District Office
- Length: 2.06 km (1.28 mi)
- Component highways: N171

Major junctions
- North end: AH 26 (N1) (EDSA)
- South end: N170 (Quezon Avenue)

Location
- Country: Philippines
- Major cities: Quezon City

Highway system
- Roads in the Philippines; Highways; Expressways; List

West Avenue is a major road in Quezon City within the Diliman area of northeastern Metro Manila, Philippines. It runs north–south through the western edge of the barangay of West Triangle. The street is located in Quezon City's commercial-residential area, known for its restaurants, car shops, schools, and villages. It is also home to the old Delta theater on the avenue's junction with Quezon Avenue. The avenue is a component of National Route 171 (N171) of the Philippine highway network.

== Route description ==
West Avenue is a four-lane road at the heart of Quezon City's residential-commercial district. It begins at its junction with EDSA west of North Avenue by the border with the central Diliman barangays of Bungad and Philam. It heads south from this junction to cross Baler Street and Examiner Street towards the intersection with Del Monte Avenue. The avenue terminates at the junction with Quezon Avenue, west of Timog Avenue, in barangays West Triangle and Santa Cruz.

== History ==
Previously called Kanluran Avenue (Tagalog for west), the avenue forms the western boundary of the formerly proposed 400-hectare (990-acre) Diliman Quadrangle within the former Diliman Estate, also known as Hacienda de Tuason, purchased by the Philippine Commonwealth government in 1939 as the new capital to replace Manila. It was originally planned as the new city's Central Park, housing the new national government buildings (the new presidential palace, Capitol Building, and Supreme Court complex) within the 25-hectare (62-acre) elliptical site now known as the Quezon Memorial Circle, according to the Frost Plan. The quadrangle is surrounded by North Avenue to the north, East Avenue to the east, Timog (South) Avenue to the south, and West Avenue to the west. The Diliman Quadrangle had been largely undeveloped for decades due to lack of funding. After several revisions, the government planners moved the city center to Novaliches due to its higher elevation. By 1976, the country's capital had been transferred back to Manila, with only the Quezon Memorial built in the former capital site.

== Intersections ==
The entire route is located in Quezon City.

km	mi	Destinations	Notes
		N170 (Quezon Avenue)	Traffic light intersection. Southern terminus. Continues as N172 (Timog Avenue)
		Colonel Martinez Street	
		Zamboanga Street	
		Times Street	
		Ligaya Street	
		Bulletin Street	Restricted access
		Masbate Street	
		Del Monte Avenue, Liwayway Street	Traffic light intersection. Westbound goes to San Francisco Del Monte district.
		Mabuhay Street	
		Cavite Street	
		Examiner Street	Access to Quezon Avenue.
		Catanduanes Street	
		Baler Street	Unsignalized intersection since Traffic lights are off due to construction. Westbound access to Roosevelt Avenue.
		West Lawin Street	Access to Phil-Am Homes
		Bulacan Street	
		East Maya Drive	Restricted access to Phil-Am Homes
		AH 26 (N1) (EDSA)	Northern terminus. Access from EDSA Southbound lane only. Access to N173 (North Avenue) via U-Turn slot.
1.000 mi = 1.609 km; 1.000 km = 0.621 mi: Closed/former; Incomplete access
