= N170 highway =

Highway in Metro Manila, Philippines

Route 170

Route information
- Maintained by Department of Public Works and Highways and Metropolitan Manila Development Authority

Major junctions
- North end: N127 (Quirino Highway) in Quezon City
- N129 (Tandang Sora Avenue); N175 (University Avenue); AH26 (EDSA); N171 (West Avenue) / N172 (Timog Avenue); N130 (Gregorio Araneta Avenue); N161 (Blumentritt Road); E2 (NLEX Connector); N140 (Lacson Avenue); N145 (Recto Avenue); N150 (Padre Burgos Avenue); N180 (Finance Road & Ayala Boulevard); N155 (Kalaw Avenue); N156 (U.N. Avenue); N140 (Quirino Avenue); N190 (Gil Puyat Avenue)
- South end: AH26 (EDSA) in Pasay

Location
- Country: Philippines
- Major cities: Quezon City, Manila, Pasay

Highway system
- Roads in the Philippines; Highways; Expressways; List
← N162	→ N171

National Route 170 (N170) is a national secondary road of the Philippine highway network. It passes through the northern part of Metro Manila, traversing through the cities of Quezon City, Manila, and Pasay.

== Route description ==
Most of the route in the northern part follows the alignment of Radial Road 7 (R-7) of Manila's arterial road network.

Based on the designation Department of Public Works and Highways (DPWH), N170 consists of the following segments, from north to south:

=== In Quezon City ===
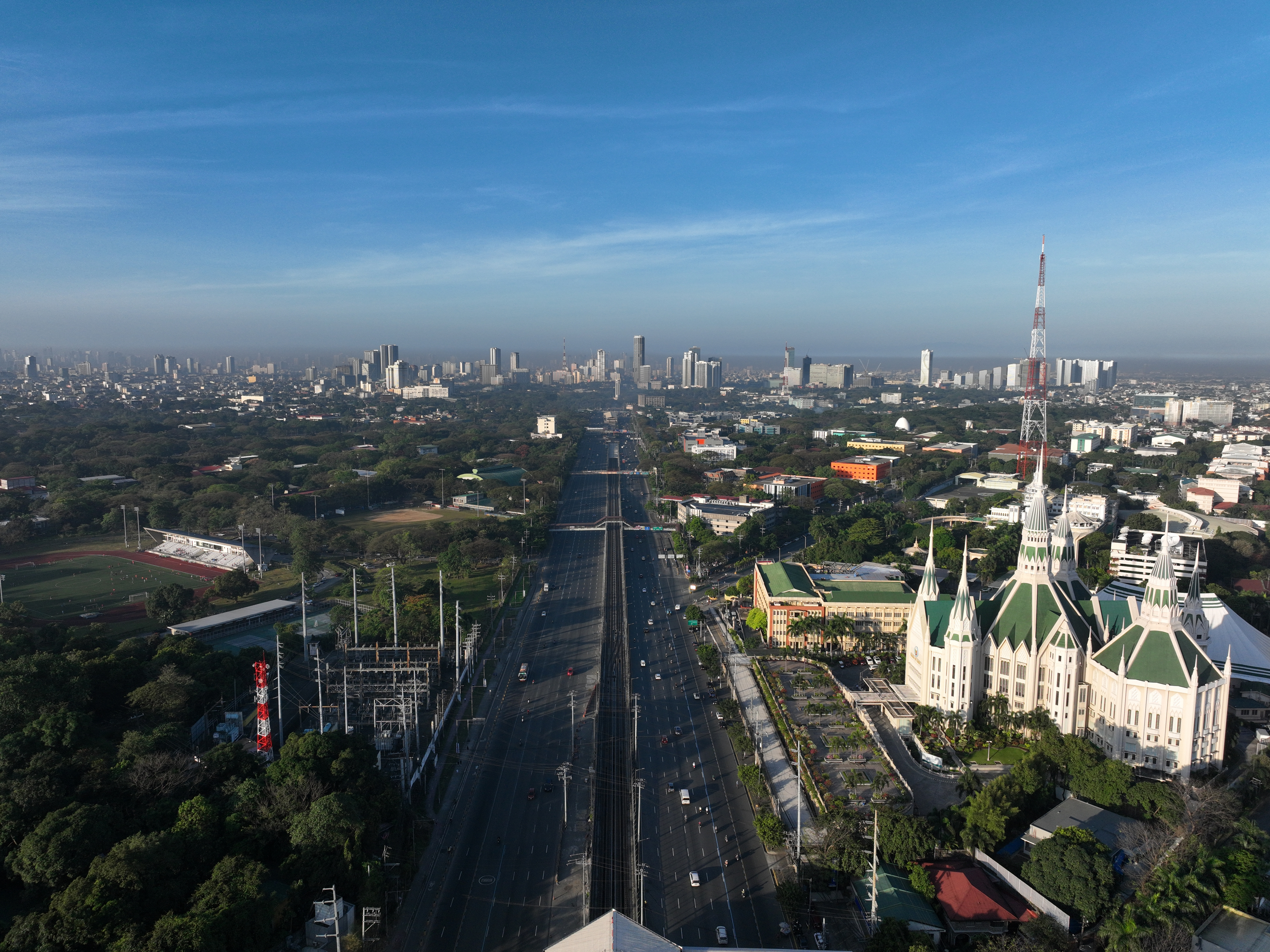
N170 as Commonwealth Avenue, with the under-construction MRT-7 line

N170 commences at its intersection with N127 in Novaliches, Quezon City as Commonwealth Avenue. It is a major highway with 6 to 12 lanes and consequently it is the widest segment of the Philippines highway network.

Due to the high incidence of road accidents, most especially those involving overspeeding, it has earned its notorious nickname the "Killer Highway." A speed limit of 60 km/h (37 mph) has been enforced on the said highway to reduce the rate of accidents.

The Manila Metro Rail Transit System Line 7 (MRT-7) has been in construction since 2016, including the span of the elevated railway network at Regalado Highway. The said mass transit system, which will connect to the Manila Metro Rail Transit System (MRT) and the North Avenue Grand Central Station, is expected to ease the flow of traffic along the avenue. Due to recent construction delays, the system's completion and operations will start, albeit partially, in 2027.

Commonwealth Avenue ends in Diliman, and N170 follows the route of Elliptical Road, an 8-lane roundabout that surrounds the Quezon Memorial Circle (QMC). Named after its elliptical shape, the Elliptical Road's traffic flow is by counterclockwise direction.

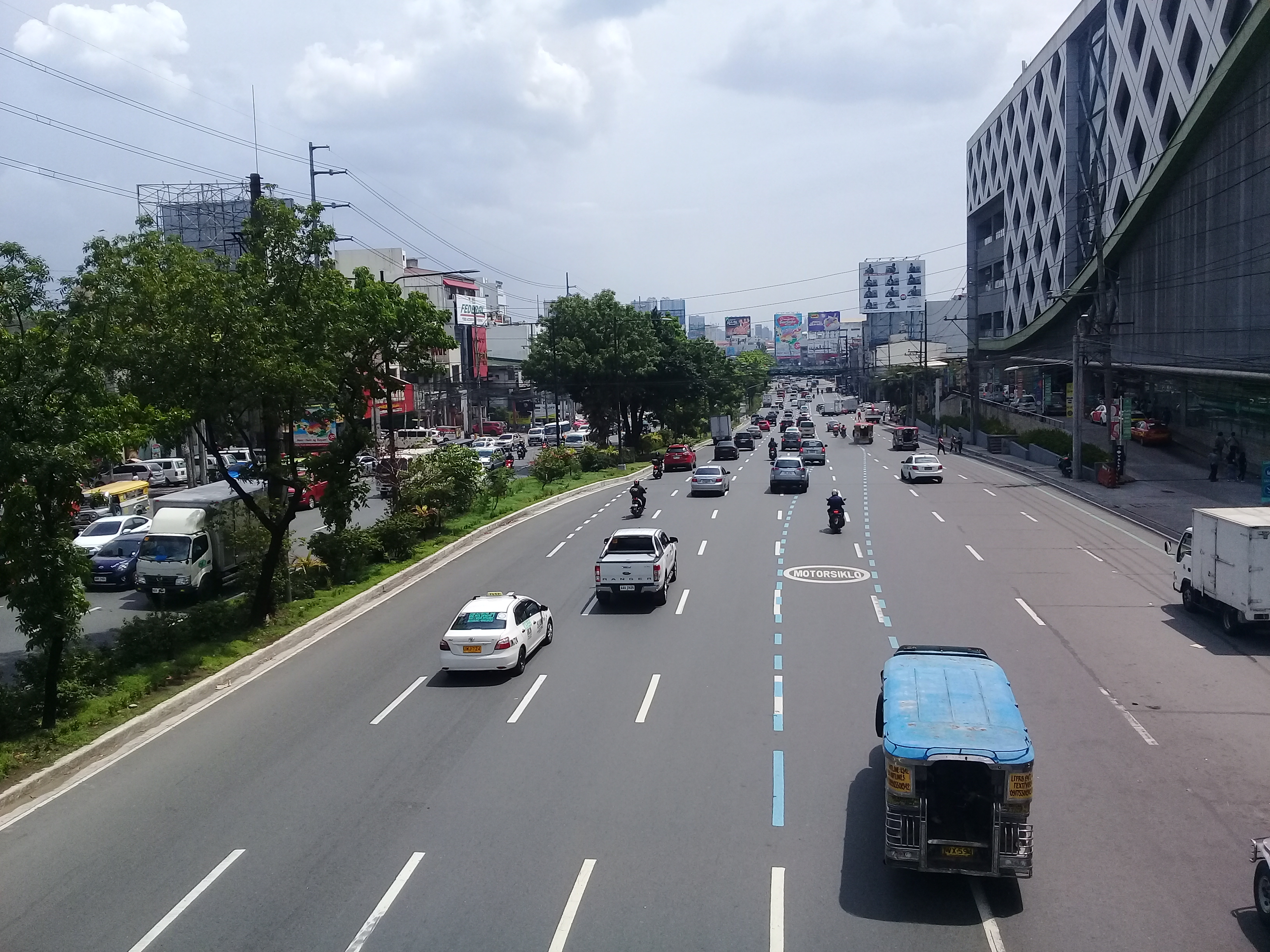
N170 as Quezon Avenue

After leaving Elliptical Road, the route follows Quezon Avenue, a major intra-city highway of Quezon City named after Manuel L. Quezon, the 2nd president of the Philippines. Beginning at Elliptical Road and ending at the Welcome Rotonda near the Quezon City–Manila boundary, it has 6 to 14 lanes and is one of the city's most comfortable roads, lined with palm trees that serve as its median. Many government and commercial buildings line the road.

=== In northern Manila ===
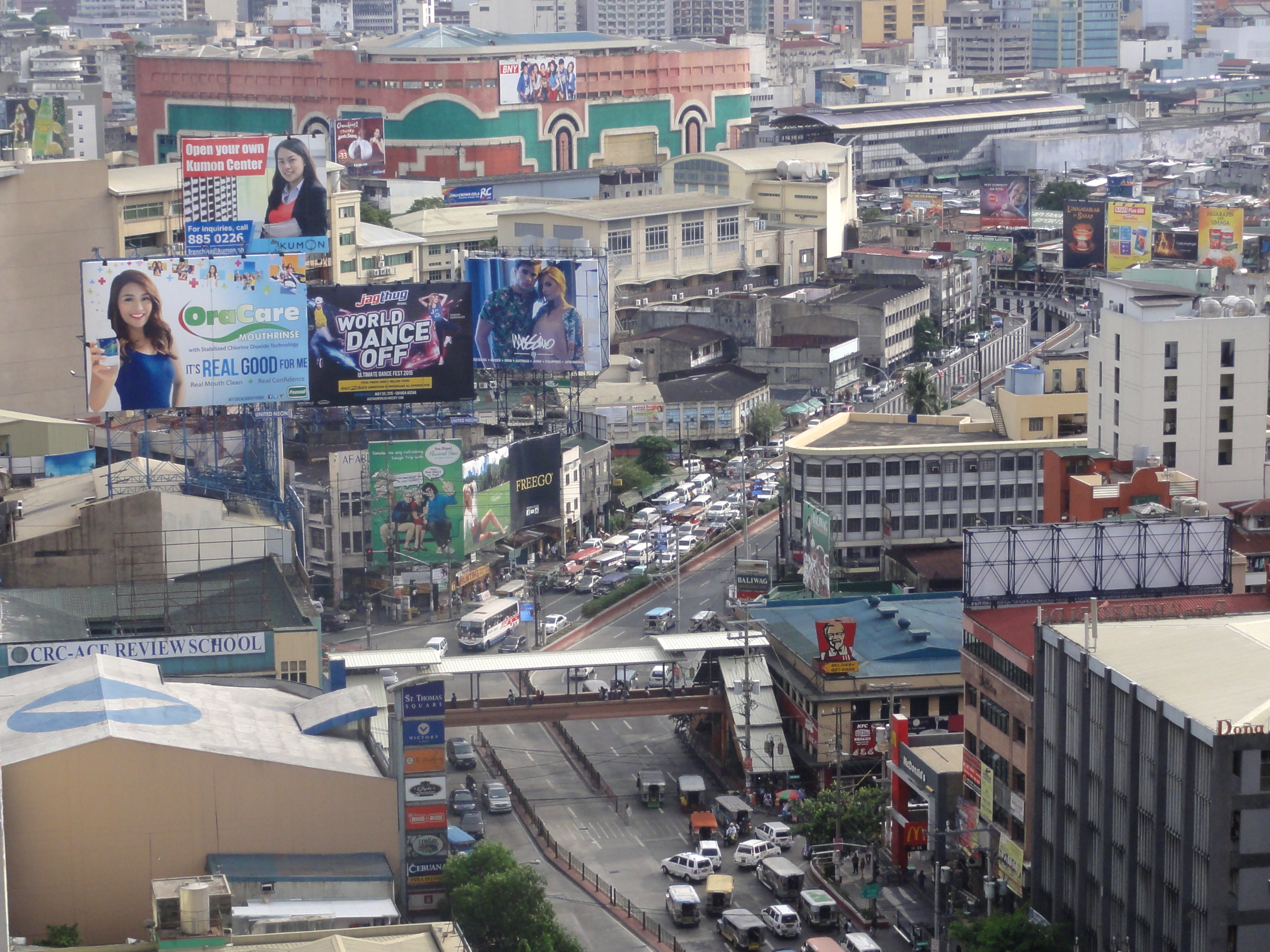
The intersection of España Boulevard and Lerma Street of N170 with Nicanor Reyes Street

After leaving the Welcome Rotonda, N170 enters the City of Manila, the nation's capital, as España Boulevard. It is a major highway in the district of Sampaloc that is named after Spain, which ruled the Philippines for 333 years, from 1565 up to 1898. It is an arterial road with eight lanes, four per direction, that commences at Welcome Rotonda and ends at the intersection of Nicanor Reyes Street (formerly Morayta) and Lerma Streets. The Nicanor B. Reyes Street leads to Recto Avenue, while Lerma Street leads to Quezon Boulevard. The University of Santo Tomas (UST) campus lies on this segment of N170.

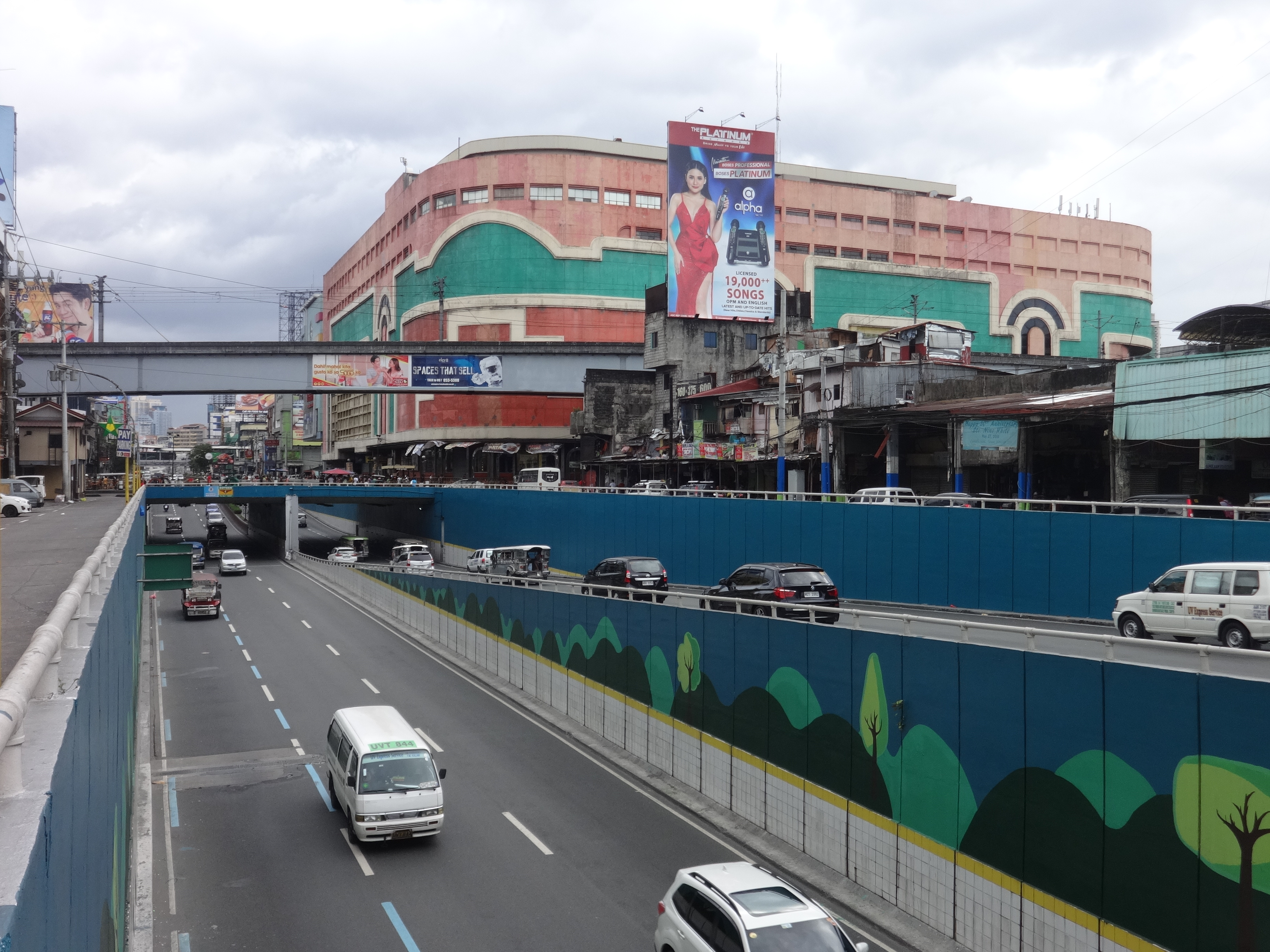
N170 as Quezon Boulevard

N170 follows Lerma Street, which links España Boulevard and Quezon Boulevard. After leaving Lerma Street, N170 is known as Quezon Boulevard, a notable intra-city highway that traverses the district of Quiapo from north to south. A 6-to-10-lane divided road, it links the traditional core of the nation's capital with the North Luzon Expressway in northern Metro Manila through Alfonso Mendoza (formerly Andalucia) and Dimasalang Streets. It also links the old downtown of Manila with Quezon Memorial Circle and Batasang Pambansa Complex in Quezon City through a tunnel that goes to the rest of northern N170. It also lies in an area known as the University Belt.

=== In southern Manila ===
N170 crosses above the Pasig River at Quezon Bridge, and this segment ends at the intersection with Antonio Villegas Street (formerly Arroceros) in Ermita. The route continues as the southbound Quezon Bridge—Liwasang Bonifacio segment of Padre Burgos Avenue. Past the Liwasang Bonifacio West Overpass, the route is discontinued; however, the gap is filled by the avenue's Liwasang Bonifacio—Taft Avenue segment, which is part of N150.

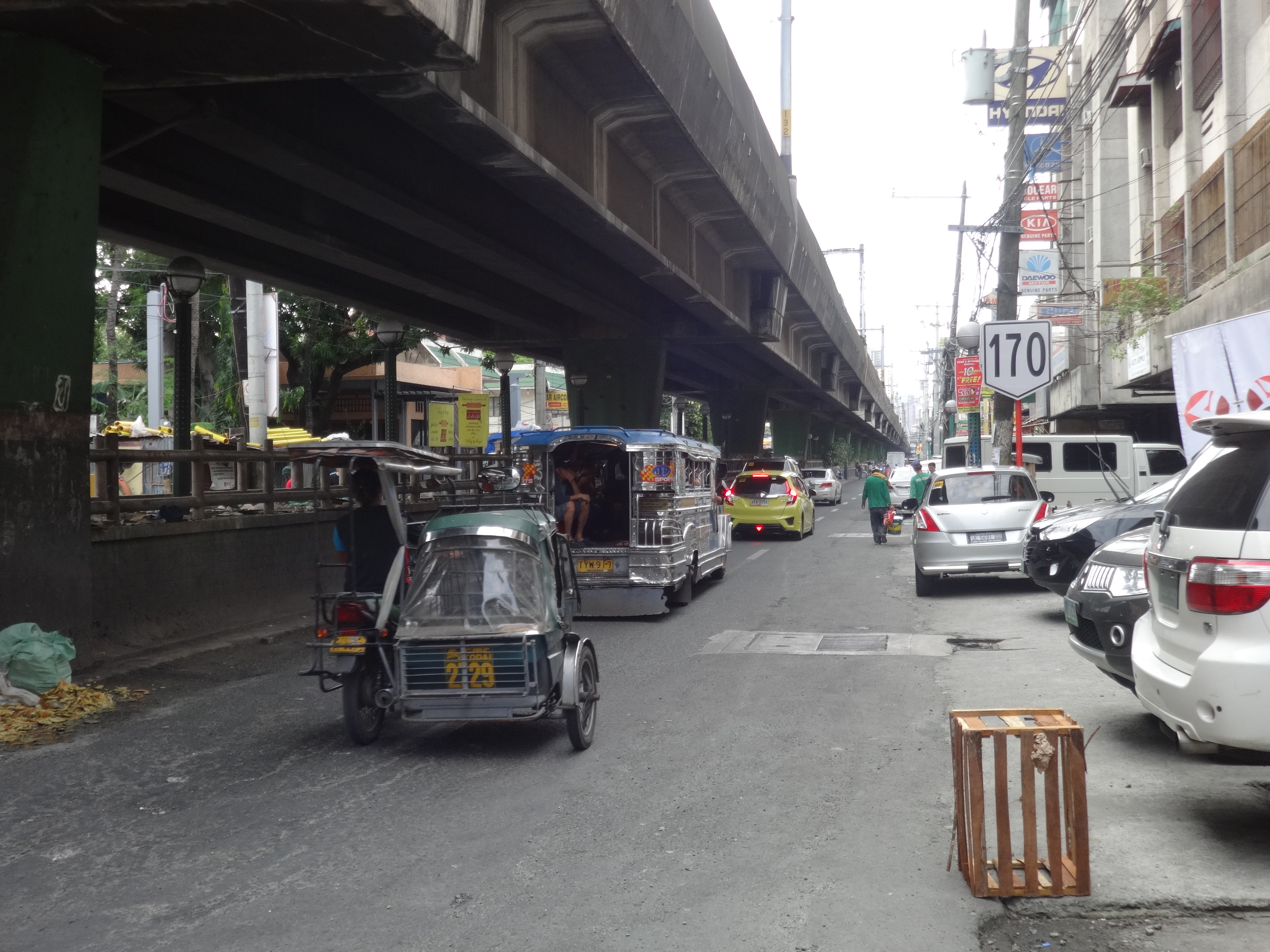
N170 as Taft Avenue

N170 resumes at the Lagusnilad vehicular underpass, and becomes Taft Avenue, the remaining segment of the route from Ermita, Manila to Pasay. It is a major highway named after the former governor-general of the Philippines and U.S. president William Howard Taft. The elevated Manila Light Rail Transit System Line 1 (LRT-1) serves as its median in its entirety. N170 ends at Taft Avenue's intersection with EDSA in Pasay. The short segment of Taft Avenue from EDSA to Harrison Avenue, known as Taft Avenue Extension and providing access to Baclaran in Parañaque, is an unnumbered national tertiary road.
