= List of museums in Metro Manila =

The following is a partial list of museums and art galleries in Metro Manila.

Museum name	Image	Location	Description
Archdiocesan Museum of Manila		121 Arzobispo Street, Intramuros, Manila	Ecclesiastical museum of the history of the Archdiocese of Manila.
Armed Forces of the Philippines Museum		Bulwagang Heneral Arturo T. Enrile, Camp Aguinaldo, Quezon City	Traditions, culture and history of the Armed Forces of the Philippines. website
Art in Island		Cubao, Quezon City	Interactive art exhibition or selfie museum
AIMS Museo Maritimo		Arnaiz Avenue corner Roxas Boulevard, Pasay	Maritime Museum of the Asian Institute of Maritime Studies. website
Ateneo Art Gallery		Katipunan Avenue, Loyola Heights, Quezon City	Modern art gallery. website
Ayala Museum		Makati Avenue corner De La Rosa Street, San Lorenzo, Makati	Philippine history and art gallery website
Bahay Modernismo		Quezon Memorial Circle, Elliptical Road, Quezon City	Features the domestic life of the Filipino family in the late 20th century
Bahay Nakpil-Bautista		Quiapo, Manila	Historic house museum
Bahay Tsinoy		Kaisa Heritage Center, 32 Anda corner Cabildo Streets, Intramuros, Manila	Chinese and Oriental museum website
Bantayog ng mga Bayani Museum		Quezon Avenue near EDSA, Pinyahan, Quezon City	Collection of items of the Martial Law period.
Bayanihan Folk Arts Museum		Philippine Women's University, Taft Avenue, Malate, Manila	Ethnological artifacts of various Philippine ethnic groups and Bayanihan Philippine National Folk Dance Company memorabilia.
Casa Manila		General Luna Street, Intramuros, Manila	Spanish colonial history.
CCP Museo ng Kalinangang Pilipino		CCP Complex, Roxas Boulevard, Pasay	Museum of performing arts. website
The Museum at De La Salle University		2401 Taft Avenue, Malate, Manila	Contemporary Filipino arts. website
Escolta Museum		Calvo Building, Escolta Street, Binondo, Manila	Museum of the history of Escolta Street.
Eulogio "Amang" Rodriguez Museum		EARIST, Lacson Avenue, Santa Mesa, Manila	Memorabilia collection of the late Senate President Eulogio Rodriguez.
The Galeón		Bay City, Pasay	Maritime museum featuring the Manila–Acapulco galleon trade
GSIS Museo ng Sining		Macapagal Boulevard, Financial Center, Pasay	Filipino arts.
Iglesia ni Cristo Museum		Punta, Santa Ana, Manila	Museum of the history and culture of the Iglesia ni Cristo. Also originally the location of the first local congregation of the Christian denomination.
Iglesia ni Cristo Museum and Gallery		INC Central Office, Commonwealth Avenue, New Era, Quezon City	Museum of the history and culture of the Iglesia ni Cristo.
Jorge B. Vargas Museum and Filipiniana Research Center		UP Diliman, Roxas Avenue, U.P. Campus, Quezon City	Collection of art, stamps, coins, library, personal papers and memorabilia of Jorge B. Vargas website
Jose P. Laurel Memorial Foundation Museum		Roxas Boulevard corner Pedro Gil Street, Malate, Manila	Private museum containing memorabilia of the late President Jose P. Laurel. website
López Museum and Library		Exchange Road corner Meralco Avenue, San Antonio, Pasig	Philippine art and history. website
Mabini Shrine		Polytechnic University of the Philippines Campus, Santa Mesa, Manila	Historic house museum
Macuha Art Gallery		Las Piñas	Macuha Art Gallery
Manila Clock Tower Museum		Manila City Hall, Ermita, Manila	Showcases the history of Manila including its history of Manila City Hall.
Metropolitan Museum of Manila		BSP Complex, Roxas Boulevard, Malate, Manila	Modern and contemporary visual arts. website
The Mind Museum		Third Avenue, Bonifacio Global City, Taguig	Science and technology museum. website
The Money Museum		BSP Complex, Roxas Boulevard, Malate, Manila	Numismatic museum, collection of currencies and coins from the different historical periods. website
Museo El Deposito		Pinaglabanan Shrine, Corazon de Jesus, San Juan	Museum showcasing the history of the Carriedo water system, including the El Deposito underwater reservoir.
Museo ni Manuel Quezon		Quezon Memorial Circle, Elliptical Road, Pinyahan, Quezon City	Contains memorabilia of the late President Manuel Quezon.
Museo ng Katipunan		Pinaglabanan Shrine, Corazon de Jesus, San Juan	Showcases the contributions of the Katipunan.
Museo ng Makati		Jose P. Rizal Avenue, Poblacion, Makati	Repository of Makati's heritage, historical properties, collections and culture.
Museo ng Muntinlupa		Centennial Avenue, Muntinlupa	City Museum
Museo ng Pag-Asa		84 Cordillera Street, Lourdes, Quezon City	Museum about feminist movements and art. website
Museo Pambata		Roxas Boulevard corner South Drive, Ermita, Manila	Museum for children.
Museo Valenzuela		Fatima Avenue, Marulas, Valenzuela	Repository of Valenzuela's history, culture and heritage.
Museum of Contemporary Art and Design (MCAD)		GF School of Design and Arts Building, De La Salle-College of Saint Benilde, Dominga Street, Manila	Housed within the stunning architecture of the College of Saint Benilde's School of Design and Arts (SDA) Campus, designed by local architect Ed Calma, the Museum of Contemporary Art and Design (MCAD) is the only space in Manila and the Philippines that approximates an international contemporary art museum and gallery space. Located within an art college, MCAD's programmes are molded in line with the school's courses. In step with this, MCAD produces outstanding exhibitions with worldwide standards by collaborating with professional artists and curators, both local and international. MCAD provides the experience and exposure to contemporary art works, usually only found outside the country. Its contemporary art exhibitions, projects, as well as other cultural and art-inspired undertakings showcase the possibilities of technology and new media through its internationally designed programme of contemporary art exhibitions enhanced by an ever-widening educational platform. website
National Museum of Anthropology		Rizal Park, Ermita, Manila	Anthropology and archaeology. website
National Museum of Fine Arts		Rizal Park, Ermita, Manila	Art gallery. website
National Museum of Natural History		Rizal Park, Ermita, Manila	Natural history and ethnography. website
Omniverse Museum		Glorietta 2, Makati	Collections of pop culture toys and figures from comic books, TV shows, movies, and novels.
Pasig City Museum		Plaza Rizal, San Jose, Pasig	Repository of Pasig's culture, tradition and history.
PEFTOK Korean War Memorial Hall		Philippine-Korea Friendship Center, Taguig	Museum dedicated to Filipino soldiers of Korean War.
Philippine Air Force Aerospace Museum		Andrews Avenue, Villamor Air Base, Pasay	Philippine Air Force life and history.
Philippine Army Museum		Philippine Army Complex, Lawton Avenue, Fort Bonifacio, Taguig	Military museum of the Philippine Army. website
Philippine National Police Museum		Camp Crame, Quezon City	Traditions, culture and history of the Philippine National Police.
Philippine Science Centrum		E-Com Building, Riverbanks Center, Barangka, Marikina	Hands-on science museum. website
Presidential Car Museum		Quezon Memorial Circle, Elliptical Road, Pinyahan, Quezon City	Displays vehicles used by the President of the Philippines
The Presidential Museum and Library		Malacañang Complex, Jose Laurel Street, San Miguel, Manila	Philippine political history and presidential memorabilia. website
QCX Museum		Quezon Memorial Circle, Elliptical Road, Pinyahan, Quezon City	Displays the history and culture of Quezon City.
Rizal Shrine Museum		Fort Santiago, Intramuros, Manila	Collection of memorabilia of the Philippine national hero Jose Rizal.
San Agustin Church Museum		General Luna corner Real Streets, Intramuros, Manila	Spanish and Filipino religious art and artifacts. website
The Shoe Museum		Jose P. Rizal Street, San Roque, Marikina	Footwear museum, collection of Imelda Marcos shoes. website
Tandang Sora Women's Museum		Quezon City	Women's history
UP Museum of a History of Ideas		Pedro Gil Street corner Taft Avenue, Manila	Natural history
UST Museum of Arts and Sciences		University of Santo Tomas Main Building, España Boulevard, Sampaloc, Manila	Natural history, visual arts, religious images, ethnography. website
Veterans Federation of the Philippines Museum		Veterans Center, Western Bicutan, Taguig	Museum dedicated to the Filipino soldiers of World War II. website
Yuchengco Museum		RCBC Plaza, Ayala Avenue corner Gil Puyat Avenue, Salcedo Village, Makati	Filipino and Filipino-Chinese arts. website

== See also ==
- List of museums in the Philippines (located in provinces in Luzon, Visayas, and Mindanao regions)
