= Quezon Memorial Circle Museum =

The Quezon Memorial Circle Museum may refer to one of the following museums within the Quezon Memorial Circle:

- Museo ni Manuel L. Quezon, a museum hosted below the Quezon Memorial Shrine itself.
- Quezon City Experience, an interactive museum.
- Quezon Heritage House, a historic house museum.
- Presidential Car Museum, a museum dedicated to vehicles owned by past presidents of the Philippines.
