= GSIS Building =

Administrative complex in Pasay, Metro Manila

- Location within Metro Manila

General information
- Location: GSIS Bldg, Financial Center, Jose W. Diokno Boulevard, Pasay, Philippines
- Coordinates: 14°32′48″N 120°59′1″E
- Completed: May 1997; 29 years ago

Design and construction
- Architect: Jorge Ramos

The GSIS Building is the headquarters of the Government Service Insurance System (GSIS), the corporation that handles social security of the employees of the government of the Philippines. Located in the city of Pasay, it shares space with the Senate and its related constitutional body, the Commission on Appointments (CA).

== History ==
=== Old building ===
The original headquarters of the GSIS was on Arroceros Street, Manila. Built in 1957, it was designed by Federico Ilustre. Gerald Lico said that it "adhered to a stylistic tendency that stood at the intersection between Neoclassical and modern aesthetics" in his book Arkitekturang Filipino.

==== Assassination of Juan Alberto ====
On September 18, 1967, former Catanduanes governor Juan M. Alberto was at the GSIS building when he was assassinated by an unknown gunman. Alberto had been waiting for an elevator at the building's ground floor when the gunman shot him in the head at close range and fled the scene, with witnesses claiming to have seen him escape with two other accomplices. The National Bureau of Investigation, the Manila Police District and the Criminal Investigation Service soon named a distant relative of Salvador Rodolfo Sr. as the prime suspect in Alberto's assassination, with the number of suspects increasing to four after nine days of investigation.

=== Planned demolition ===
In 2017, it was reported that much of the structure will be demolished, save for the facade. The Manila Hall of Justice will be built in its place. Two years earlier, it was proposed to be used as a homeless shelter. Although the eighth groundbreaking for the new building was done in 2012, no actual construction happened until 2019. The Supreme Court said that the new building will be built by June 2022. In December 2024, the Supreme Court said that construction would start on the first quarter of 2025; the delay was due to a design flaw that found in the original plans.

== Current building ==
The new headquarters in Pasay was designed by Jorge Ramos. The Senate transferred to the GSIS Building in 1997, after sitting at the Old Congress Building in Manila. President Joseph Estrada, comparing the Old Congress Building and the GSIS building, said that the latter looks like a bank, while the former had character and ambiance.

On November 30, 2025, a fire broke out at the Senate's Legislative Technical Affairs Bureau located in the third floor, causing water damage to the Senate's session hall.

=== Usage by the GSIS ===
The GSIS houses a Filipino-themed art museum, the GSIS Museo ng Sining, in the building. It is covered by parquet floors and is home to pre-colonial and colonial period artwork.

=== Usage by the Senate ===
The Senate, which meets in a separate place from the House of Representatives which is in the Batasang Pambansa Complex, rents usage of the building from the GSIS. In 2009, Senator Miriam Defensor Santiago urged the Senate to build its own building, as they are paying 7.8 million pesos for the building and 500,000 pesos for the parking lot, every month. This totaled to almost 100 million pesos in a year.

By 2017, Senator Panfilo Lacson, who is also the chairman of the Committee on Accounts, said that the Senate has paid 2.24 billion pesos to the GSIS since 1996. Arguing that the Senate could have paid for a new building with this amount, there have been moves to find a new building for the Senate. The Manila Film Center was suggested, but due to urban legends of it being haunted by the ghosts of the construction workers who built it prior to a major accident, the Senate decided to look for other options. Lacson spearheaded a successful vote approving the transfer of the Senate to a new building in Taguig.

The Senate has its museum in the building.

==== Escape of Ronald dela Rosa ====
Senate CCTV footage showing Sen. dela Rosa running away from the NBI

On May 11, 2026, the NBI accompanied by former senior lieutenant and senator Antonio Trillanes IV attempted to arrest Sen. Bato dela Rosa on the day of the impeachment proceedings of Vice President Sara Duterte, which was based on a warrant issued by the International Criminal Court for crimes against humanity. A CCTV footage was presented by the Senate as evidence, showing dela Rosa running from NBI agents up the stairway the moment he surreptitiously entered the Senate building through the assistance of the newly sworn-in Senate President Alan Cayetano. Witnesses reported hearing gunfire during the chase. In response to the report the NBI stated that nobody was injured. Dela Rosa arrived at the Senate plenary claiming he had been "wrestled" by the NBI. The Senate placed the entire building into a full lockdown, prohibiting all individuals, including the NBI agents and Trillanes, from leaving the building. It was later lifted in the evening. Dela Rosa was then placed under Senate protective custody by Senate Pres. Cayetano. Consequently, the NBI agents who attempted to arrest dela Rosa were cited in contempt by the Senate as soon as surveillance footages were presented at the plenary. Dela Rosa stayed in the GSIS Building until May 14, when he left the compound at approximately 2:30 A.M. accompanied by Sen. Robin Padilla. The Senate security chief was ordered suspended by the Ombudsman after a shootout at the Senate premises that resulted in a temporary blackout and dela Rosa and Padilla's escape.

=== Other usage ===
Its theater hosted the funeral of former Senate President and nationalist Dean Jovito Salonga in 2016. The Philippine Olympic Committee announced that it would hold a special election for its officers in 2019 after meeting at the building. The election was then held at the Senate premises.
