= Bahay Modernismo =

Museum in Quezon City, Philippines

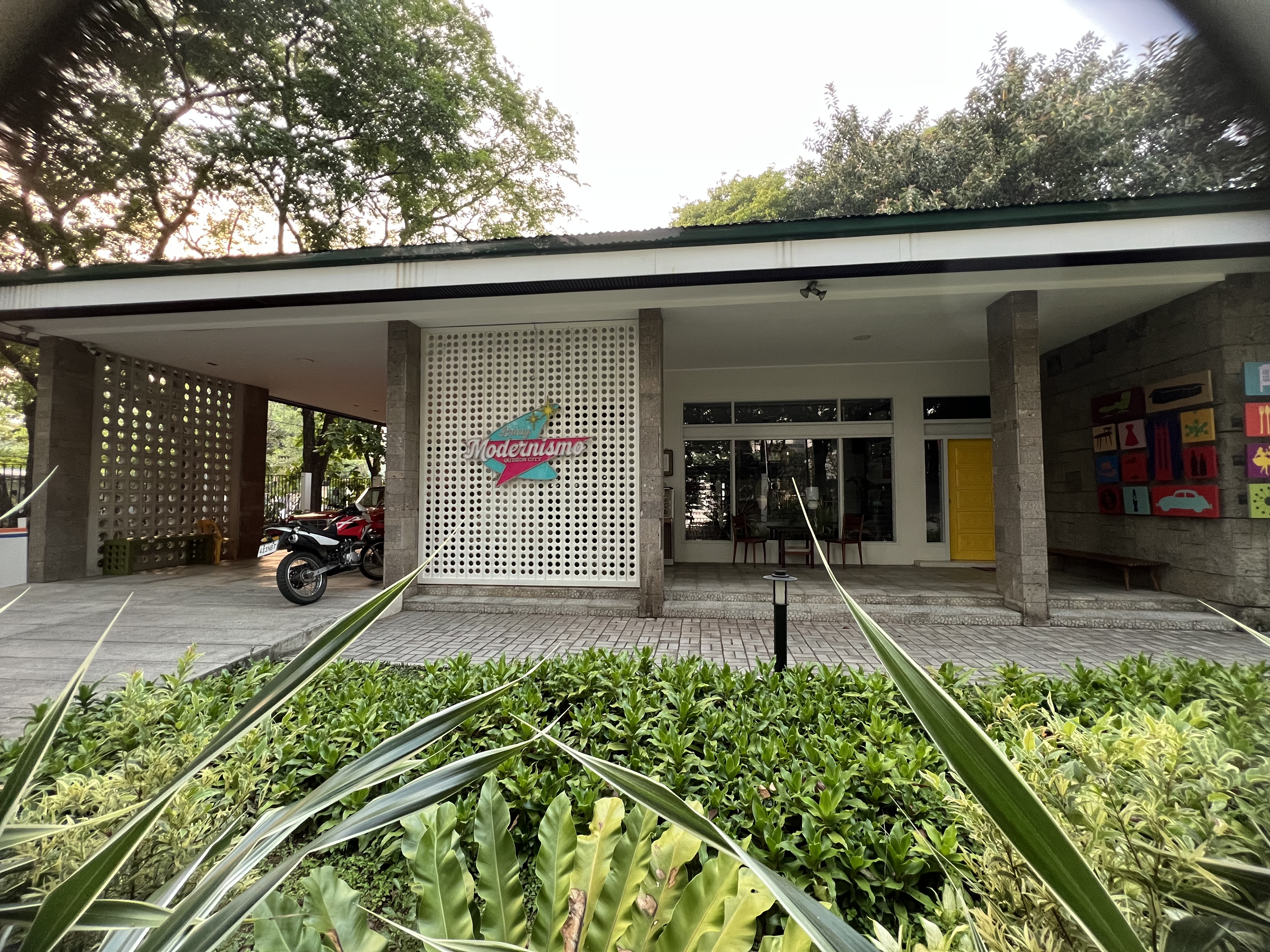
- The museum in 2026
- Established: 2025; 1 year ago
- Location: Quezon Memorial Circle, Quezon City, Metro Manila, Philippines
- Coordinates: 14°38′57″N 121°03′02″E
- Curator: Gerard Rey Lico
- Building details

General information
- Type: Split-level bungalow
- Architectural style: Modern

Technical details
- Floor count: 1

Design and construction
- Architect: Gerard Rey Lico
- Architecture firm: Arc Lico

The Bahay Modernismo (lit. 'modernism house') is a museum within the Quezon Memorial Circle in Quezon City, Metro Manila, Philippines. It features Filipino domestic life in the latter half of the 20th century.

== Background ==
The Bahay Modernismo is a museum within the Quezon Memorial Circle in Quezon City which had its grand opening on May 30, 2025.

The museum features Filipino family living in the post-World War II era. It has furniture and household items typically used from the 1950s to 1970s. The museum has six rooms – a kitchen, a home office, an entertainment room, and three bedrooms. Gerard Rey Lico is the curator.

The building itself is a split-level bungalow using some of the original materials of the demolished residence of the Aquino family at No. 25 Times Street. Lico of Arc Lico is also the architect. It follows a Modernist architecture style with flat roofs and big jalousie windows.
