= Quezon Heritage House =

Historic house museum in Quezon City, Philippines

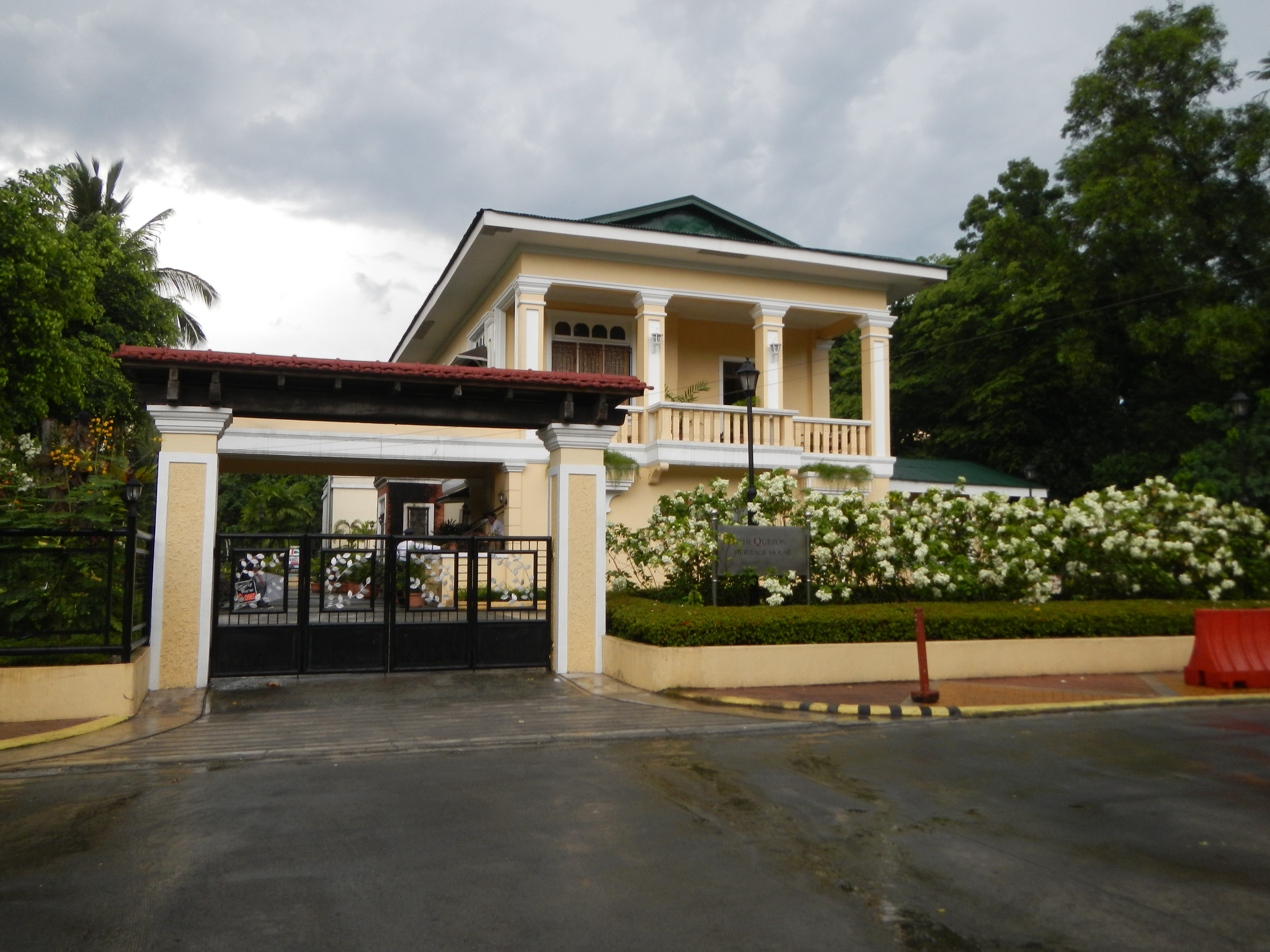
- Established: 2013 (museum)
- Type: Historic house museum
- Building details

General information
- Status: Completed
- Architectural style: Neoclassical
- Location: 45 Gilmore Street, New Manila (1920s-2013); Quezon Memorial Circle (2013-present), Quezon City, Philippines
- Coordinates: 14°38′58.4″N 121°03′01.1″E (current location)
- Named for: Manuel L. Quezon and his family
- Completed: 1920s
- Relocated: 2013
- Renovation cost: ₱10 million (relocation)
- Owner: Quezon City Government

Technical details
- Floor count: 2

The Quezon Heritage House is a historic house museum within the grounds of the Quezon Memorial Circle in Quezon City, Philippines. It is situated across the Quezon City Hall.

== History ==
The Quezon Heritage House is a reconstructed version of the house at 45 Gilmore Street in New Manila which served as residence of former President Manuel Quezon's family.

The Quezons moved to the house in 1927 when it was offered to them after then-Senator Manuel L. Quezon contracted tuberculosis. The house's living room was also the site where the Philippine National Red Cross was established by the consent of Aurora Aragon Quezon. The house was used as a weekend home by the Quezons until they were forced to flee to Corregidor in 1941 during the World War II. Manuel Quezon died in 1944 and his family moved back to the house on the next year. The Quezons acquired the house on installment and managed to acquire three adjacent properties near the house. It once again became the weekend house of the family and was later occupied by the family of Maria Zeneida Quezon-Avanceña. Quezon-Avanceña later moved out of the house to reside in Alabang for health reasons.

It was during the administration of then-Mayor Feliciano Belmonte Jr. that plans to preserve the house was made. Belmonte approached the National Historical Commission of the Philippines and had talks on the city government's prospects of acquiring the house, as well as the registration of the building as a heritage site but the house did not meet all requirements for the designation. The house was transferred and preserved to the Quezon Memorial Circle by the city government under the administration of Mayor Herbert Bautista. In April 2013, a new foundation was laid for the house and the house, then in Gilmore was disassembled. The parts of the house were removed with care and was used for restoration. The disassembling process was finished in June of the same year. The Quezon family also donated some furnitures and fixtures for the house. The total cost for the relocation was ₱10 million. The Quezon Heritage House, which now functions as a museum, was inaugurated in the same year.

With the passing of the Ordinance No. SP-2428 by the Quezon City Council in 2015, the Quezon Heritage House was designated as a Local Heritage Site of Quezon City by the city government.

== Architecture and design ==
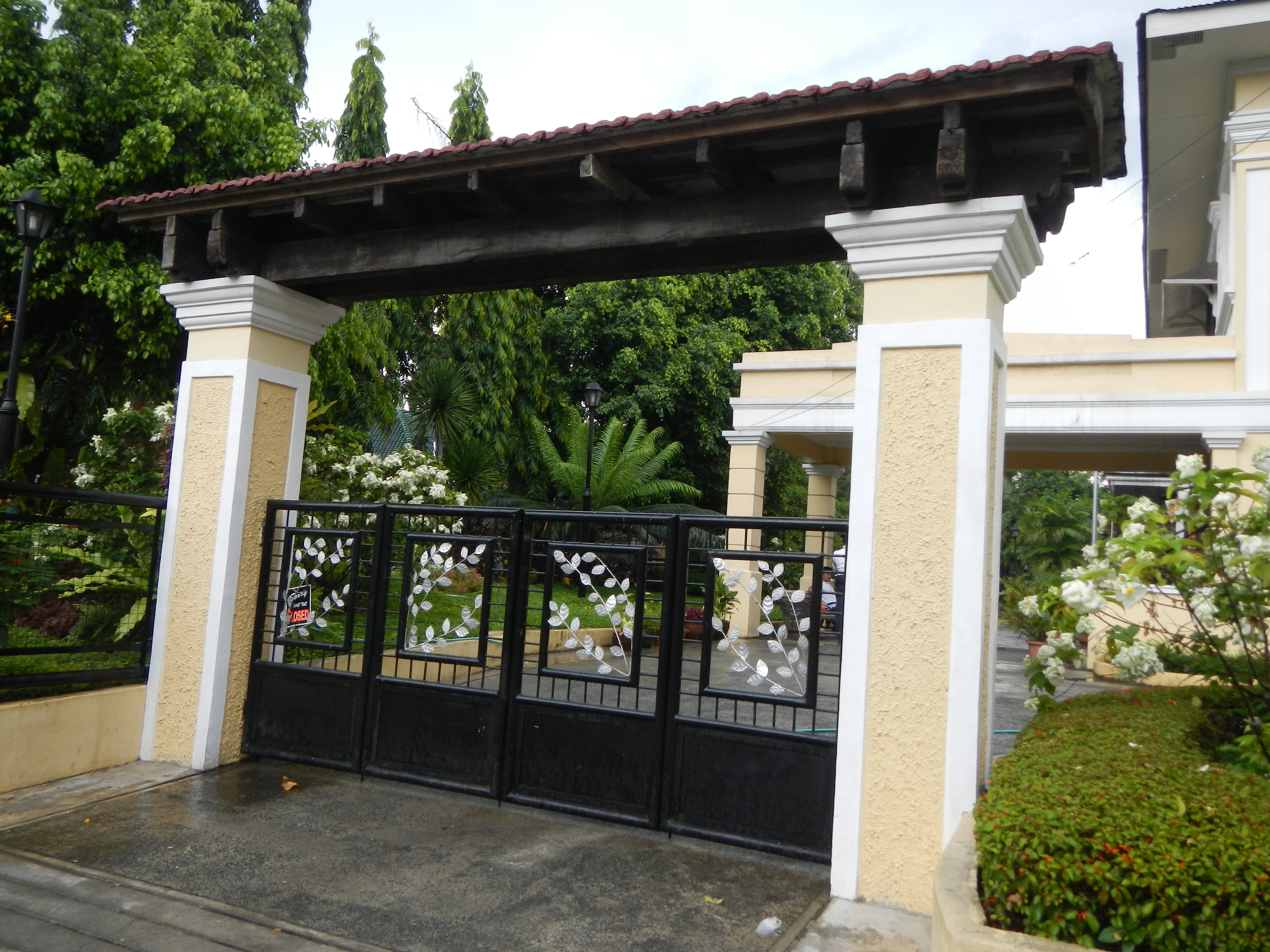
The gate of the house does not strictly follow the Neoclassical style

The Quezon Heritage House was built in Gilmore Street in the 1920s in the Neoclassical style. It had two floors and was painted in beige and white. However the house did not follow strictly the Neoclassical theme and underwent several modifications by the Quezon family in the span of more than 50 years. 60 percent of the original house in Gilmore was used for the reconstruction of the house building now located at the Quezon Memorial Circle.

An adjacent rectangular social hall was present in the Quezon house complex. It has round columns and is only a single storey high and features Fu Dog sculptures and two Caryatids as part of the support. Between the social hall and the house building is a rectangular pool which was converted into a fountain when the building was transferred to the Quezon Memorial Circle. The glass doors etched with bamboo with iron-wrought leaves served as the main entrance of the house. This fixture is one of the non-neoclassical features of the heritage house.

== Features ==
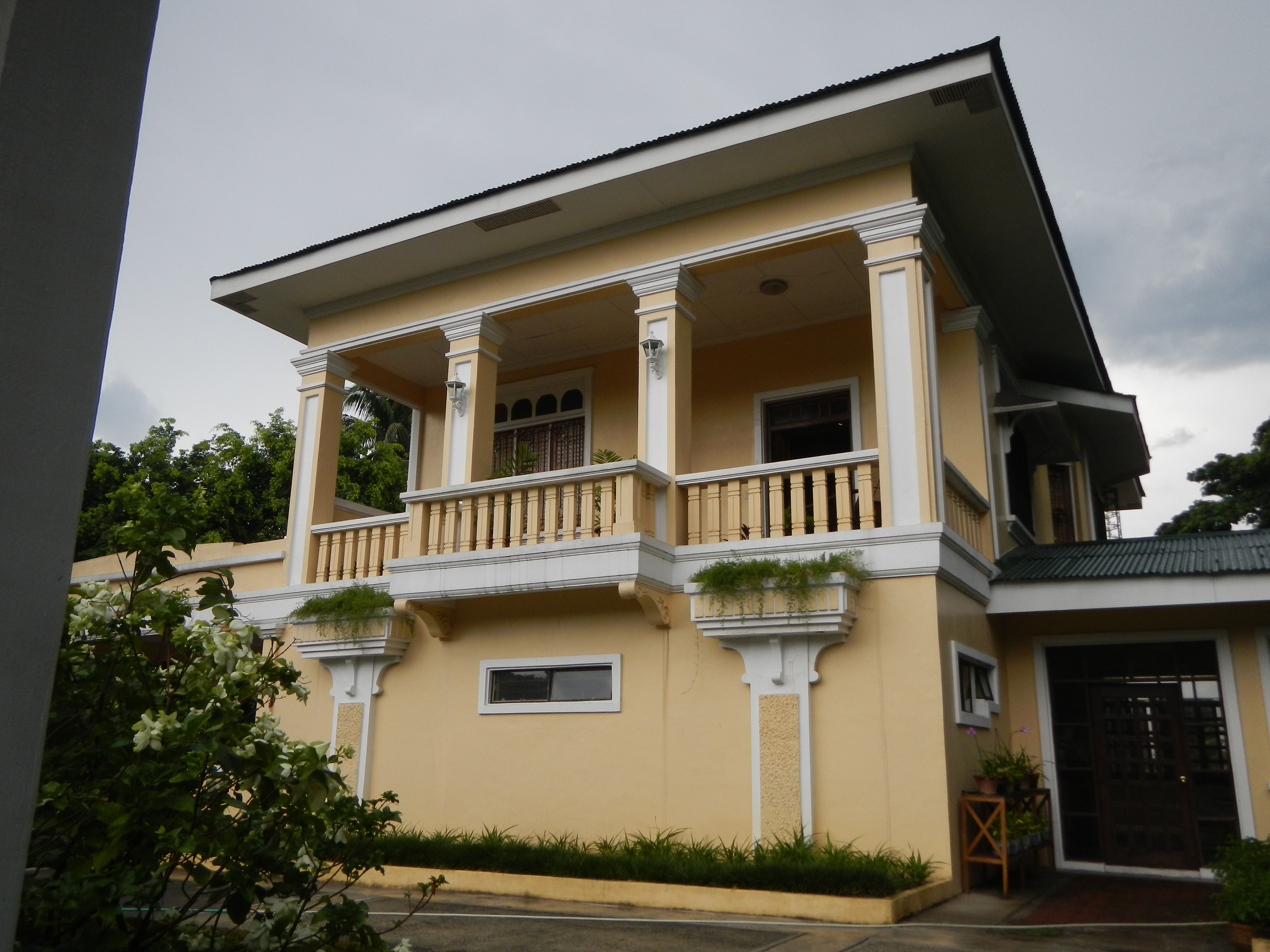
Side view of the facade of the house building

The Quezon Heritage House now serves as a museum focusing on the personal life of former President Manuel Quezon, complementing the nearby Museo ni Manuel L. Quezon at the base of the Quezon Memorial Shrine which focuses on the former president's political career.

The main room on the ground floor was used by former First Lady, Aurora Quezon as her office where she was establishing the Philippine Red Cross. Also on the same floor is a room used by Aurora in her later years as well as a guest room constructed during the time the Quezon-Avanceñas were occupying the house. A kitchen each for the first and second floor is also present.

The primary attraction of the museum is the second floor where the two bedrooms of former president Quezon and his wife are situated which is linked by a comfort room. The original beds made from Narra used by the couple is also placed inside the rooms. The couple had separate rooms due to Manuel Quezon's illness. The spiral staircase which was present in the house when it was still in Gilmore was retained upon its relocation to its current place. The cabinets and mirrors, doors, grills and some stained glass panels were also among the original features retained.
