= Quezon Memorial Circle =

National urban park in Quezon City, Philippines

- Quezon City Circle
- Aerial view of the Quezon Memorial Circle (2026)

- Location within Metro Manila Location within Luzon Location within Philippines
- Type: Urban Park
- Location: Elliptical Road, Diliman, Quezon City, Philippines
- Coordinates: 14°39′05.1″N 121°02′57″E
- Area: 27 hectares (67 acres)
- Created: 1978
- Administrator: Windsor P. Bueno (Quezon City Government –Majority; 26 hectares (64 acres)); National Historical Commission of the Philippines (Quezon Memorial Shrine area; 1 hectare (2.5 acres))
- Visitors: 3,385,738 (2023)
- Public transit: 5 7 PHILCOA; Future: Quezon Memorial
- Website: www.quezoncity.gov.ph

The Quezon Memorial Circle, also known as the Quezon City Circle, is a national park in Quezon City, Philippines, and a prominent landmark situated within a large elliptical roundabout known as Elliptical Road. Serving as the main park of Quezon City, which was the official capital of the Philippines from 1948 to 1976, the park is renowned for its centerpiece: a 66-meter (217 ft)-tall mausoleum. The monument enshrines the remains of Manuel L. Quezon, the second president of the Philippines and the first president of the Commonwealth of the Philippines, alongside his wife, First Lady Aurora Quezon.

The Quezon Memorial Circle is also set to become a pivotal point in the Manila Metro Rail Transit System (MRT) with the construction of the Quezon Memorial Circle station, which will be an underground station on the approved MRT Line 7.

Locally referred to as the "Circle", the park has recently undergone substantial enhancements led by the local government to attract more visitors, both local and international. These improvements have significantly increased the number of visitors to the park.

== History ==
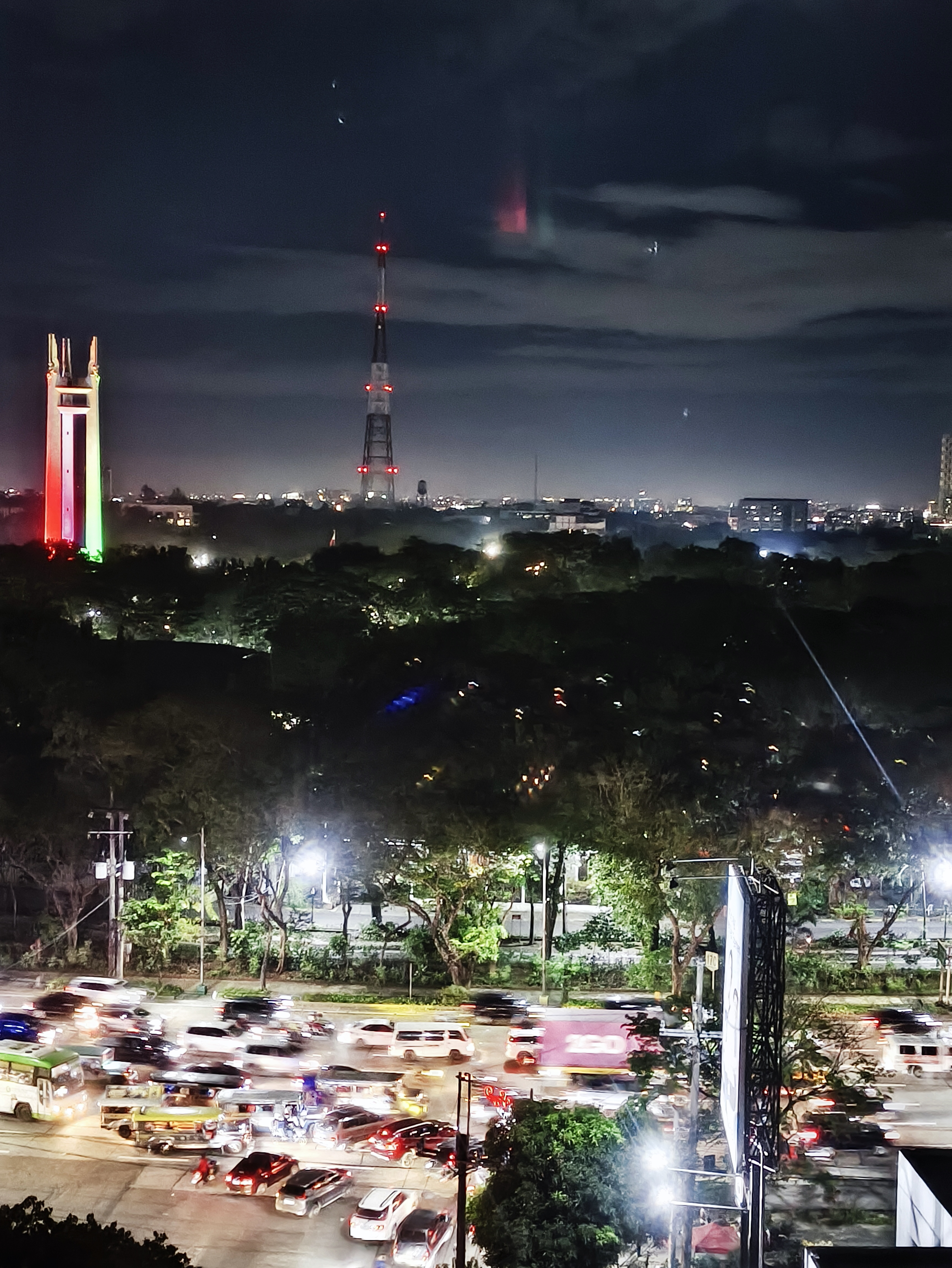
Quezon Memorial Circle at night

Originally conceived as the site for the National Capitol in Quezon City, the Quezon Memorial circle was intended to house the Congress of the Philippines. This location was part of a broader plan for a National Government Center (NGC) encompassing Elliptical Road and the Quezon City Quadrangle, which includes the North, South, East, and West Triangles. The NGC aimed to consolidate the three branches of the Philippine government—legislative, executive, and judicial—into a single area. However, while the cornerstone was laid on November 15, 1940, construction halted due to the outbreak of World War II in the Philippines, leaving only the foundations completed.

In December 1945, following the end of World War II, President Sergio Osmeña issued Executive No. 79 to form the Quezon Memorial Committee. This committee was tasked with raising public funds to build a memorial in honor of his predecessor, President Manuel L. Quezon.

Former Quezon City Mayor Tomas Morato played a crucial role in selecting the memorial's site. Although President Elpidio Quirino later proposed relocating the monument, Morato strongly opposed this idea. His opposition led him to resign as the congressman representing the 2nd district of Quezon Province in 1949 over disputes with Quirino's plan.

In 1951, a national contest for the Quezon Memorial Project was held, with Filipino architect Federico Ilustre emerging as the winner. His design included not only the monument but also plans for a presidential library, a museum, and a theater.

The undeveloped grounds of Quezon Memorial Circle saw significant events, including a public mass celebrated by Pope Paul VI in 1970.

Following the People Power Revolution in 1986, the Quezon City Parks Development Foundation (QCPDF) was established under Mayor Brigido Simon Jr. Through a tripartite agreement involving the Quezon City government, the National Historical Institute (now the National Historical Commission of the Philippines), and the National Parks Development Administration (NPDA), the NPDA gained jurisdiction over the park's 27 hectares (67 acres). However, the Quezon Memorial Shrine remained under the National Historical Institute's control. The NPDA subsequently transferred park management to the QCPDF, which was authorized to generate revenue for its upkeep.

In the 1980s, the architecture firm led by Francisco Mañosa developed a master plan for the park, reflecting its evolving role as a central urban space. On July 1, 2008, after managing the park since September 27, 1988, the QCPDF handed over management responsibilities to the Quezon City government.

On January 23, 2003, Romulo Kintanar, a former commander of the New People's Army, was assassinated at a restaurant inside the circle.

During the COVID-19 pandemic, the park adapted to meet critical needs by providing makeshift dormitories for health workers from nearby hospitals and serving as a testing site.

== Park lay-out ==
=== Quezon Memorial Shrine ===
Quezon Memorial Shrine

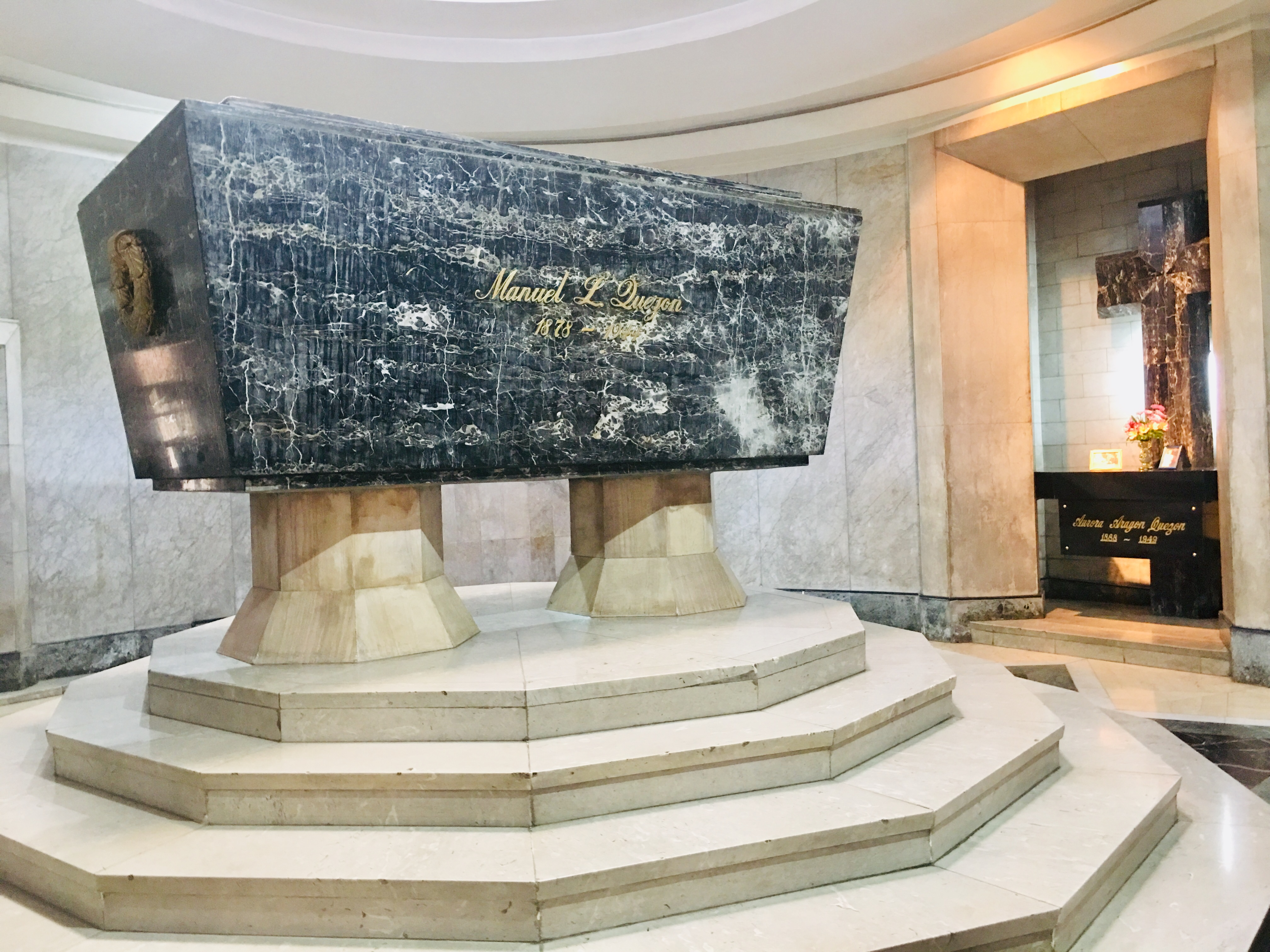
Tomb of President Manuel Quezon and his wife Aurora located at Quezon Memorial Circle, Quezon City

The Quezon Memorial Shrine is an art deco-themed monument designed by Federico Ilustre and was built during the 1950s – serving as the centerpiece of the Quezon Memorial Circle. The 66-meter (217 ft) shrine representing Quezon's age when he died from tuberculosis stands on a thirty-six hectare elliptical lot. It houses an observation deck that can accommodate sixty people at the top through a spiral staircase which gives the visitors a panoramic view of the city.

At the top of the pylons are three mourning angels holding sampaguita (the national flower) wreaths sculpted by the Italian sculptor Francesco Monti. The regional identity of each female angels figure could be discerned in the traditional costume they were clothed with. The winged figures atop the three pylons represented Luzon, Visayas, and Mindanao. The three pylons would in turn circumscribe a drum-like two-story structure containing a gallery from which visitors could look down at Quezon's catafalque, modeled after Napoleon Bonaparte's in the Invalides. The gallery and the catafalque below are lit by an oculus, in turn reminiscent of Grant's Tomb.

=== Museums ===
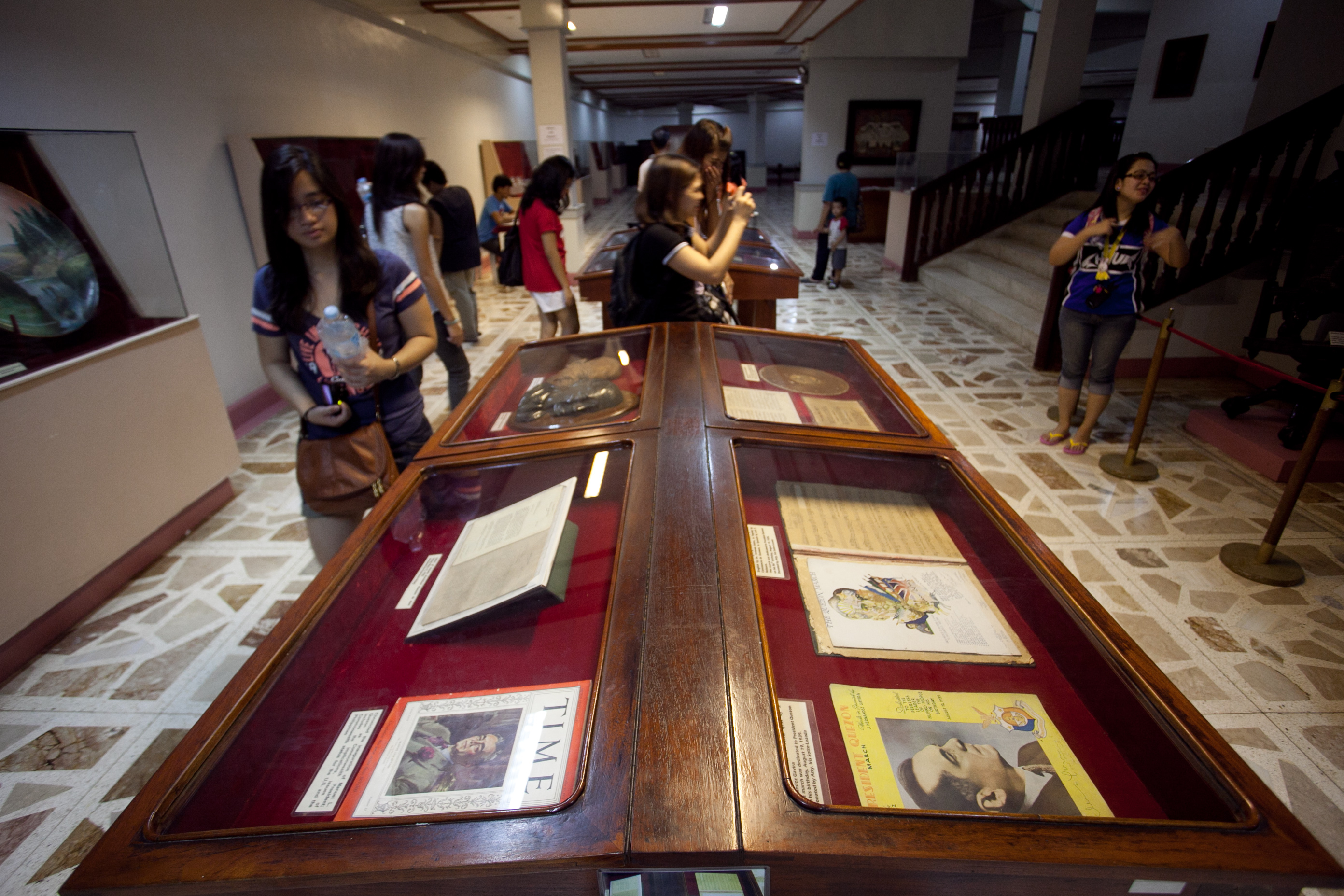
Display at the Museo ni Manuel L. Quezon in 2012

The planned auxiliary structures (presidential library, museum, and theater) were never built. Two smaller museums, one containing the presidential memorabilia of Quezon, and the other containing items on the history of Quezon City, were installed within the Shrine itself. In the 1980s, missing, lost, or incomplete bas reliefs for the outside of the memorial were installed.

A house of Manuel L. Quezon family in Gilmore, New Manila was transferred within the Quezon Memorial Circle and was made a museum. A city museum, the Quezon City Experience (QCX) was also opened within park grounds in late 2015. The QCX was closed during the COVID-19 pandemic in 2020 and its building was converted into a COVID testing center and later a processing site for applicants seeking government aid.

The Presidential Car Museum, housing the presidential cars of former Philippine presidents, was inaugurated on August 19, 2018.

On May 30, 2025, the Bahay Modernismo, a museum on Philippine history and culture during the 1950s and 1960s, was opened inside the complex. It is housed in a structure that integrates the structural and architectural parts of the demolished residence of the Aquino family in 25 Times Street, Quezon City.

=== Recreation spaces ===
Illuminated fountains and shrine at night

Quezon City Circle also hosts the Circle of Fun, a small amusement park which has various rides such as the "Fun Drop" a drop tower ride and the "Sea Dragon", a pirate ship type of amusement ride. A separate attraction, the Pedal N Paddle offers go-kart rides, boat rides in a small pond, fish spa, a 4D theater and Skybike, where patrons ride modified bicycles attached on an elevated rail.

A children's playground and a rental bicycles are also available which can be used on a bicycle track within the park. Dining outlets and a flea market are also situated within park grounds.

Previously the park had a disco area near the Quezon Memorial Shrine but it has been closed down.

Public facilities for events such as the Seminar Hall, Century Hall, People’s Hall, and a stage, as well as covered courts were introduced by the city government which took over administration of the park in 2008. A dancing fountain was also renovated by the city government which is illuminated with colors at night. The fountain was removed in 2025 as part of the park's redevelopment.

=== Gardens, monuments, and markers ===
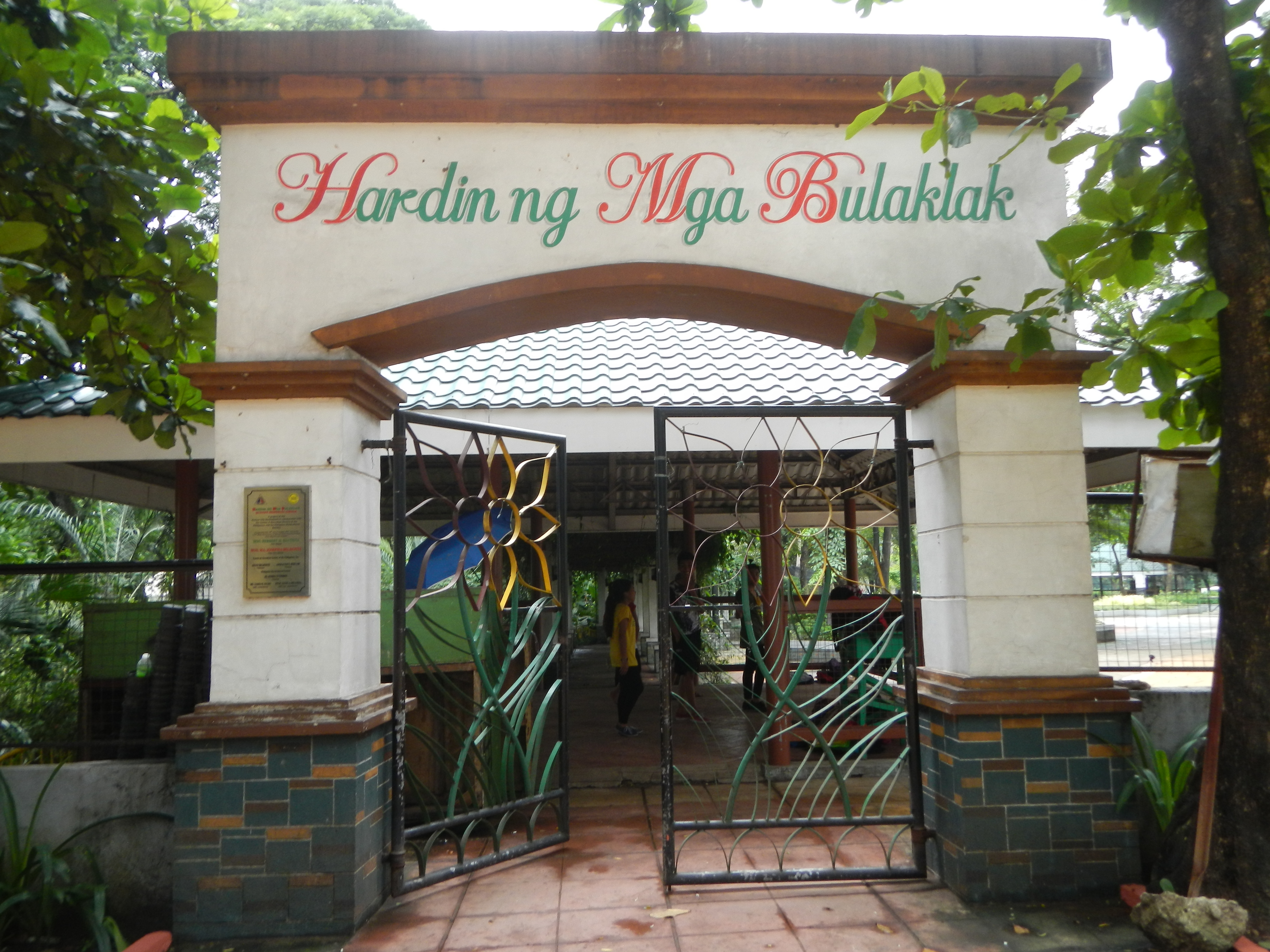
Hardin ng Mga Bulaklak gate.

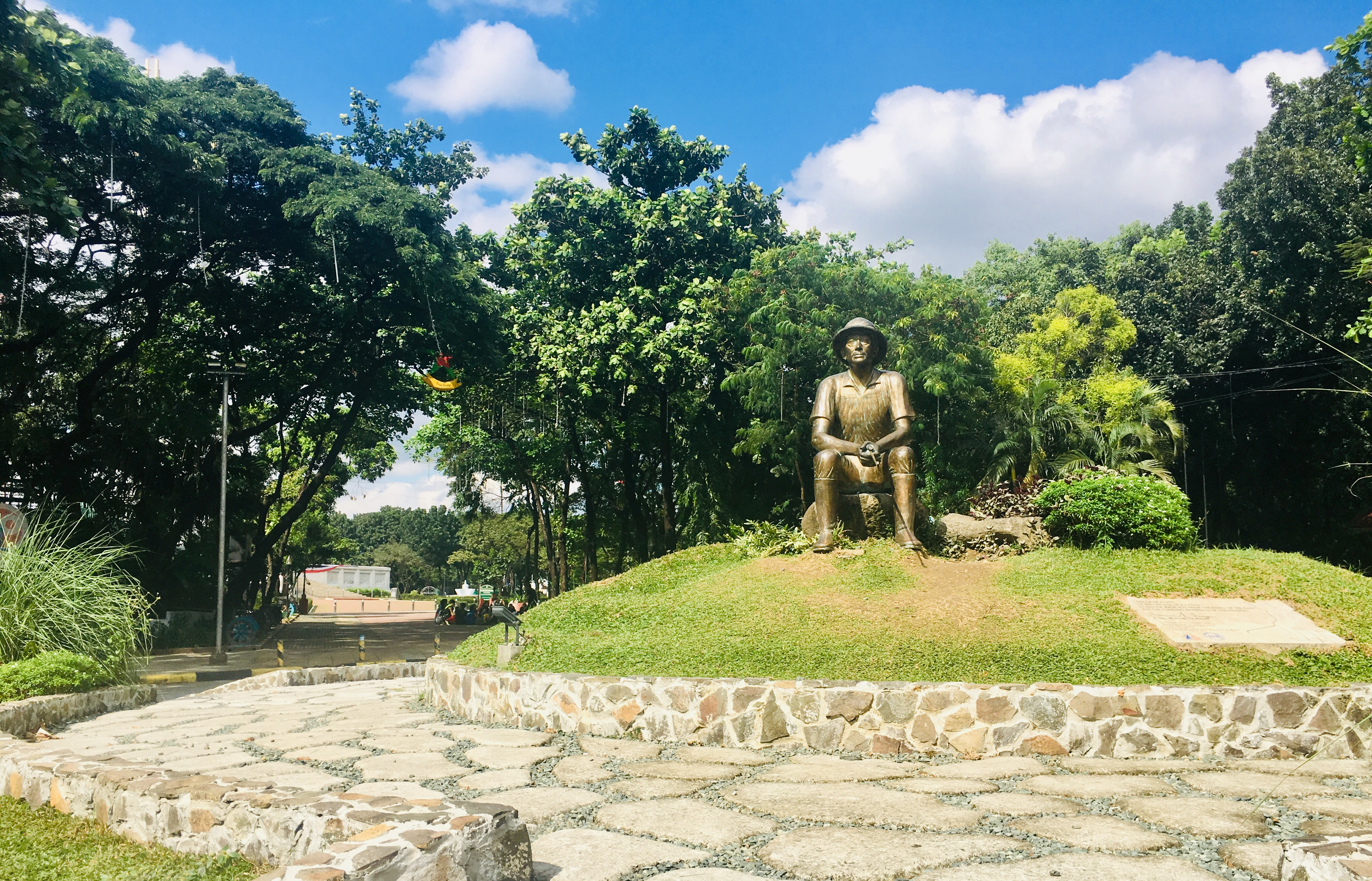
Welcome statue of President Manuel Quezon at Quezon Memorial Circle

The elliptical park features smaller gardens and named green spaces within its grounds such as the Hardin ng Mga Bulaklak (lit. 'Garden of Flowers') and the Tropical Garden. The Quezon Memorial Circle also host a demo urban farm which in 2015 is occupying a 1,500 square meters (16,000 sq ft). The urban farm inside the park is one of the several sites under the "Joy of Urban Farming" project of Vice Mayor Joy Belmonte which was launched in 2010. In 2011, the Cactus and Succulent Garden designed by Serapion Metilla was opened to the public.

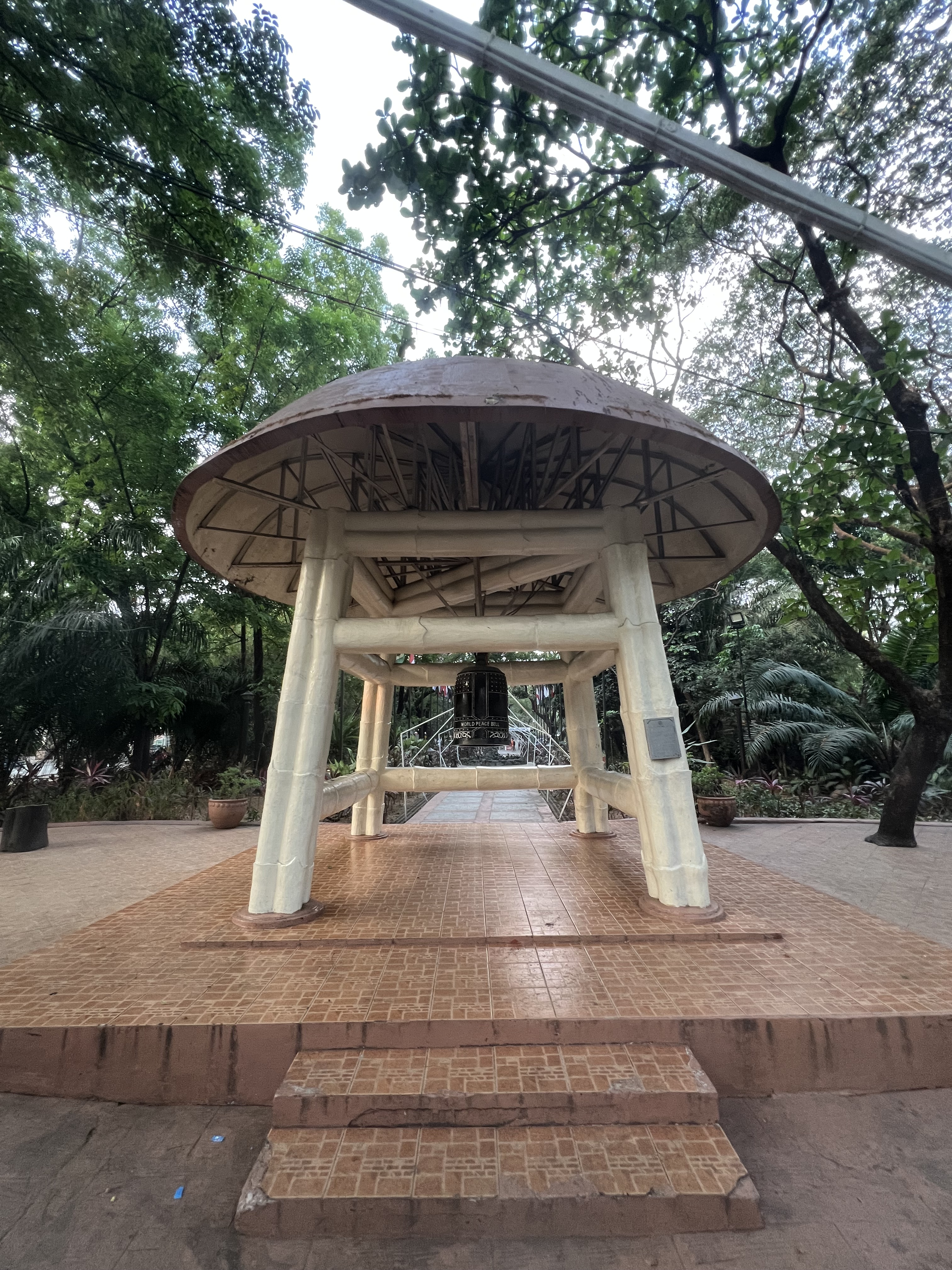
World Peace Bell

Among the other areas of the park is the World Peace Bell. The bell installed not before 1994, was a donation of the World Peace Bell Association, a Japanese organization promoting awareness on the world peace movement. The Philippines was the first Southeast Asian nation to receive a bell from the association. The first bell was made from coins donated by the then 65 member countries of the United Nations, weighs 365 kilograms (805 lb), has a height of 1.05 meters (3.4 ft), and a diameter of 60 centimeters (24 in). It was designed by the Quezon City Planning Office.

The bell was turned over to then Quezon City Vice Mayor Charito Planas by World Peace Bell Association Executive Chairman Tomojiro Yoshida at the Tsunamachi Mitsui Club in Tokyo on July 1, 1994. The bell was inaugurated by then President Fidel V. Ramos on December 10, 1994, who formally presented the bell to then Quezon City Mayor Ismael Mathay.

A Peace Monument was also erected inside the grounds of the park by the Rotary Club. It marked Quezon City as a Rotary Peace City as part of the "Community Peace Cities/Towns" concept conceived by the Rotary Club of Wagga Wagga, Australia. Quezon City is the fifth Rotary Peace Community in the Philippines and 25th in the world. The peace monument was inaugurated on December 7, 1999. The monument was removed due to the construction of the Quezon Memorial Circle Station of MRT-7.

The Philippine–Israel Friendship Park is hosted within the larger Quezon Memorial Circle beside the Quezon Heritage House. The park had its groundbreaking in December 2017 and was inaugurated in August 2018. It commemorate President Manuel L. Quezon's efforts to accept 1,000 Jewish refugees in the Philippines during the World War II era and the Philippines' support for the United Nations Partition Plan for Palestine and the establishment of the State of Israel.

=== Transportation ===
The Quezon Memorial Circle is totally engulfed by the Elliptical Road. A ₱49 million pedestrian underpass was opened in October 2007 which connects the lot occupied by the Quezon City Hall and the park. A second underpass connects the park to the Philcoa area near the Commonwealth Avenue amounted to ₱87 million and opened in December 2009.

The park will also host an eponymous station of the Manila Metro Rail Transit System Line 7 (MRT-7), which is under construction.

== Vendors and stalls ==
As of 2017, the Quezon Memorial Circle hosts five restaurants and 13 food stalls. There are also 19 kiosks, 39 plant stalls, as well as 21 stalls from Agri-Aqua Network International. 7 other establishments also has presence in the park including the TEC bike rental, Pedal n Paddle Inc., and Philippine Mango Seedling. Following a planned redevelopment of the park by Mayor Joy Belmonte some stall vendors and restaurants surrounding the park's children's playground vacated the park after their permit expired on June 30, 2019. Within the same year, Belmonte launched the Fresh Market, a weekly farmer-to-consumer program, that would allow farmers from nearby provinces to sell produce to residents within the park.

== Visitors ==
In 2012, it was reported that an average of 8,000 people visit the Quezon Memorial Circle daily. The average figures during the weekends were reportedly higher during the weekends amounting to 12,000 people. In December 2011, more than a million visited the park.

== Gallery ==
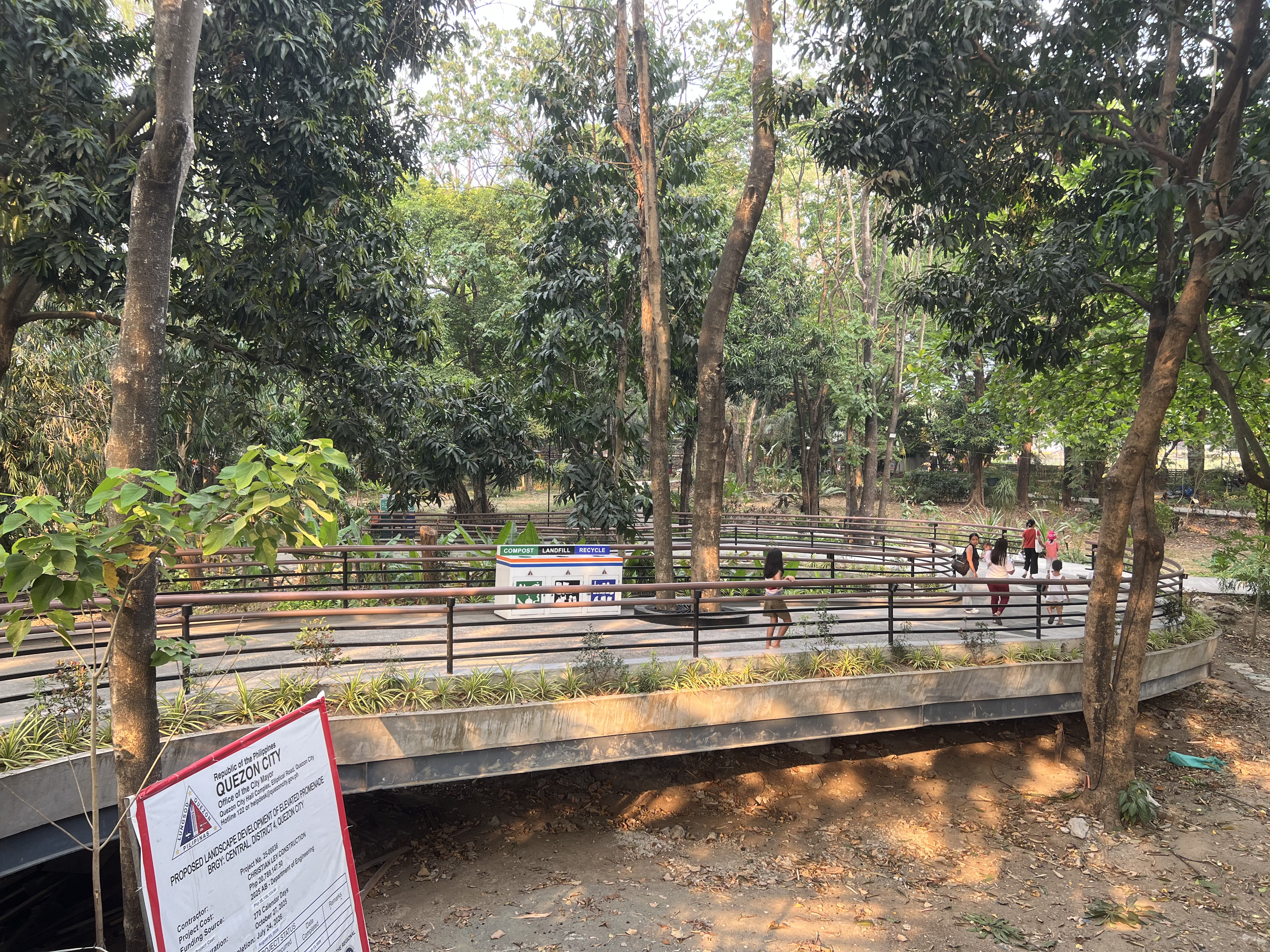
Elevated promenade connecting to the outside of the Ninoy Aquino Parks & Wildlife Center

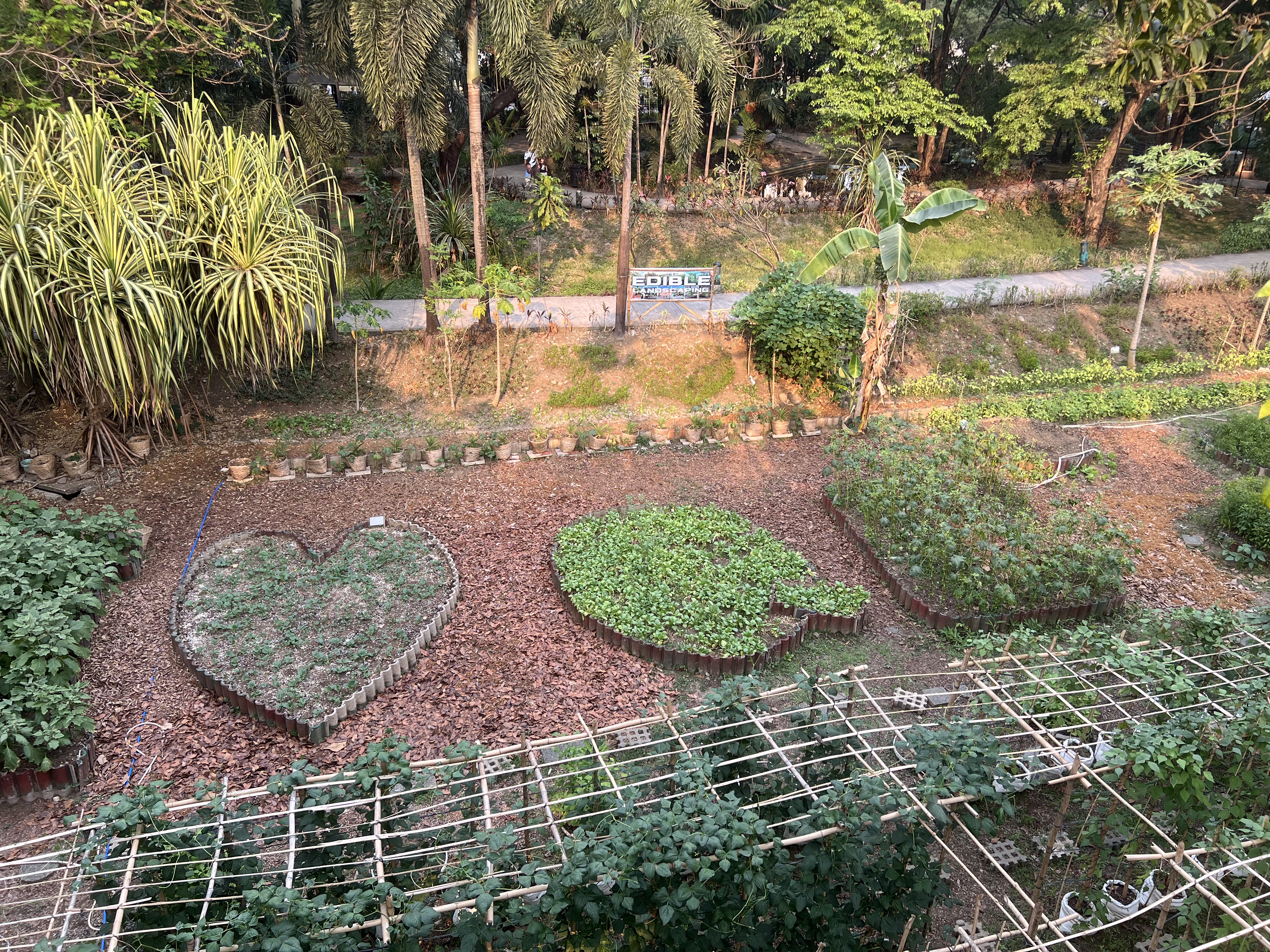
Edible Landscaping garden

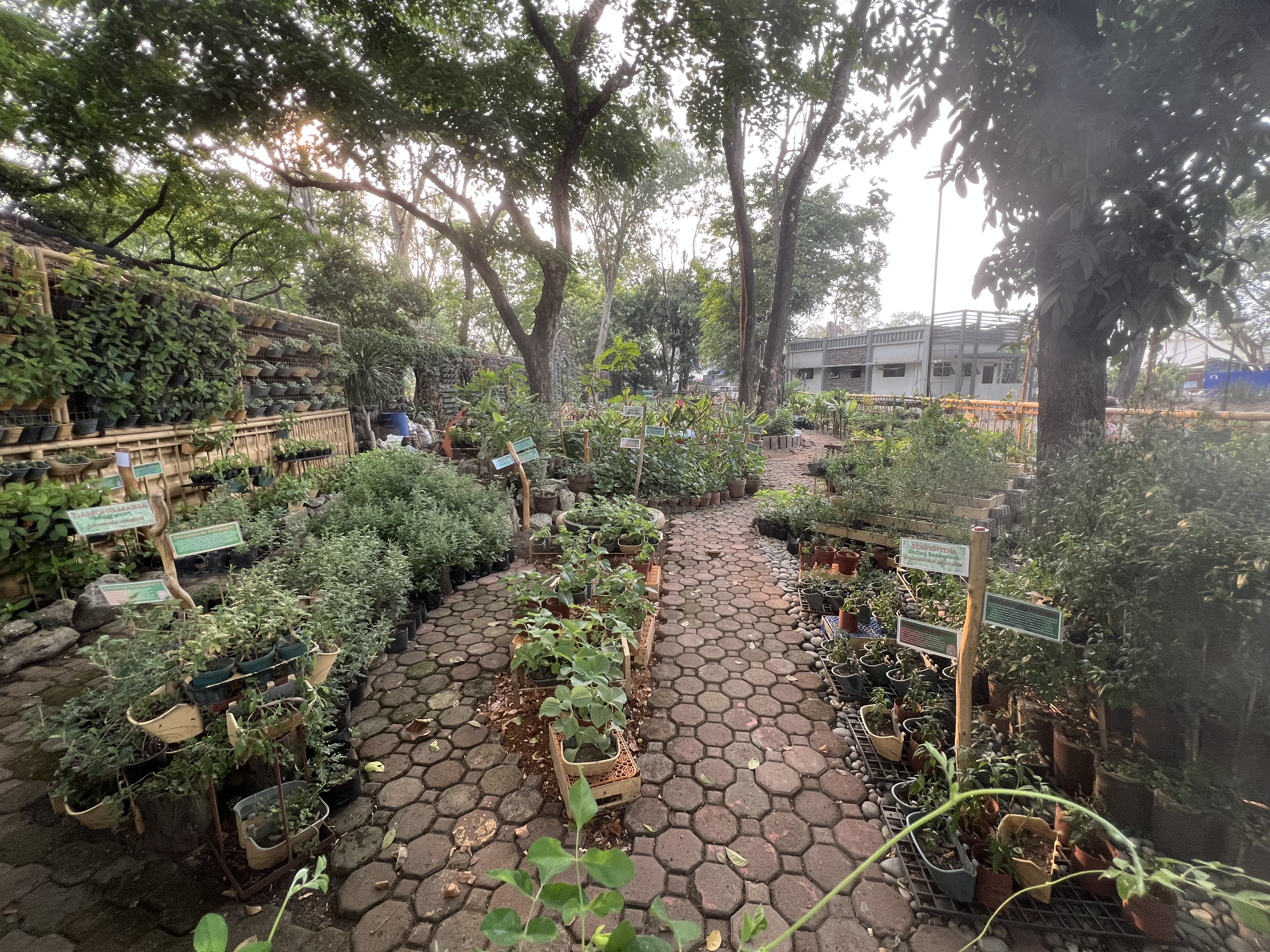
Botika sa Paso (medicinal plant garden)

Quezon Memorial Shrine

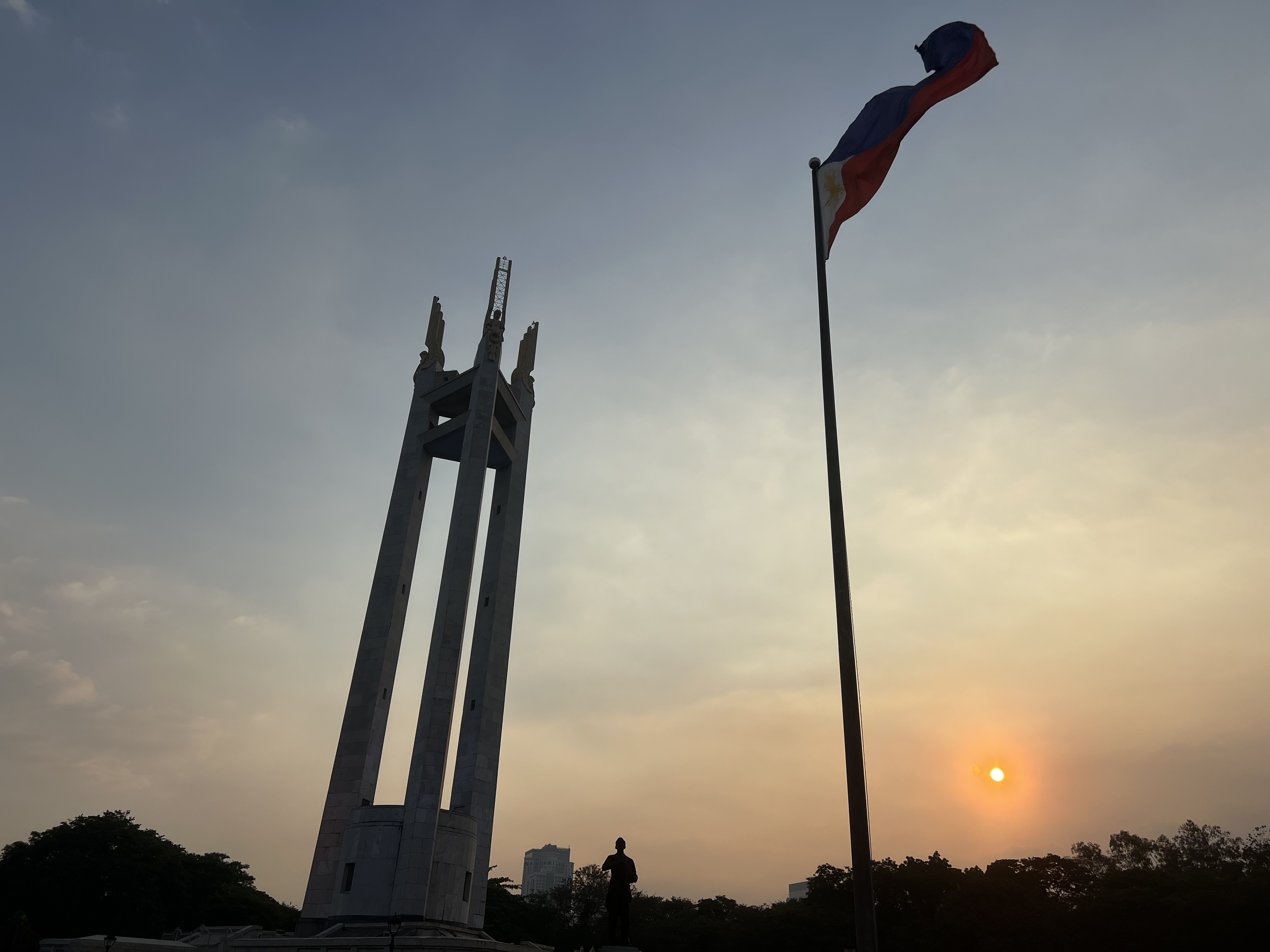
Quezon Memorial Shrine at dusk

Quezon Memorial Shrine at night

Fireworks at Quezon Memorial Shrine

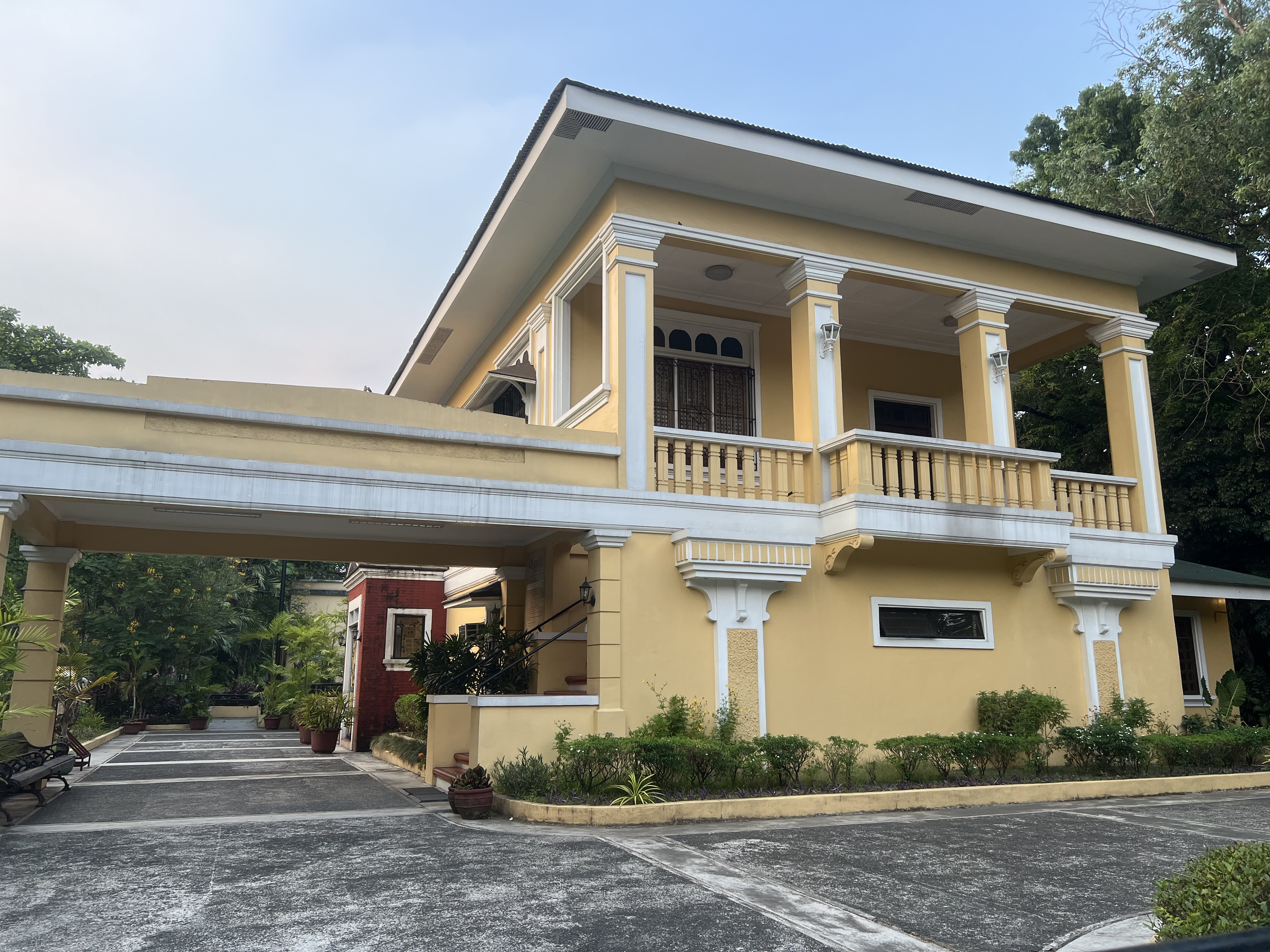
Quezon Heritage House

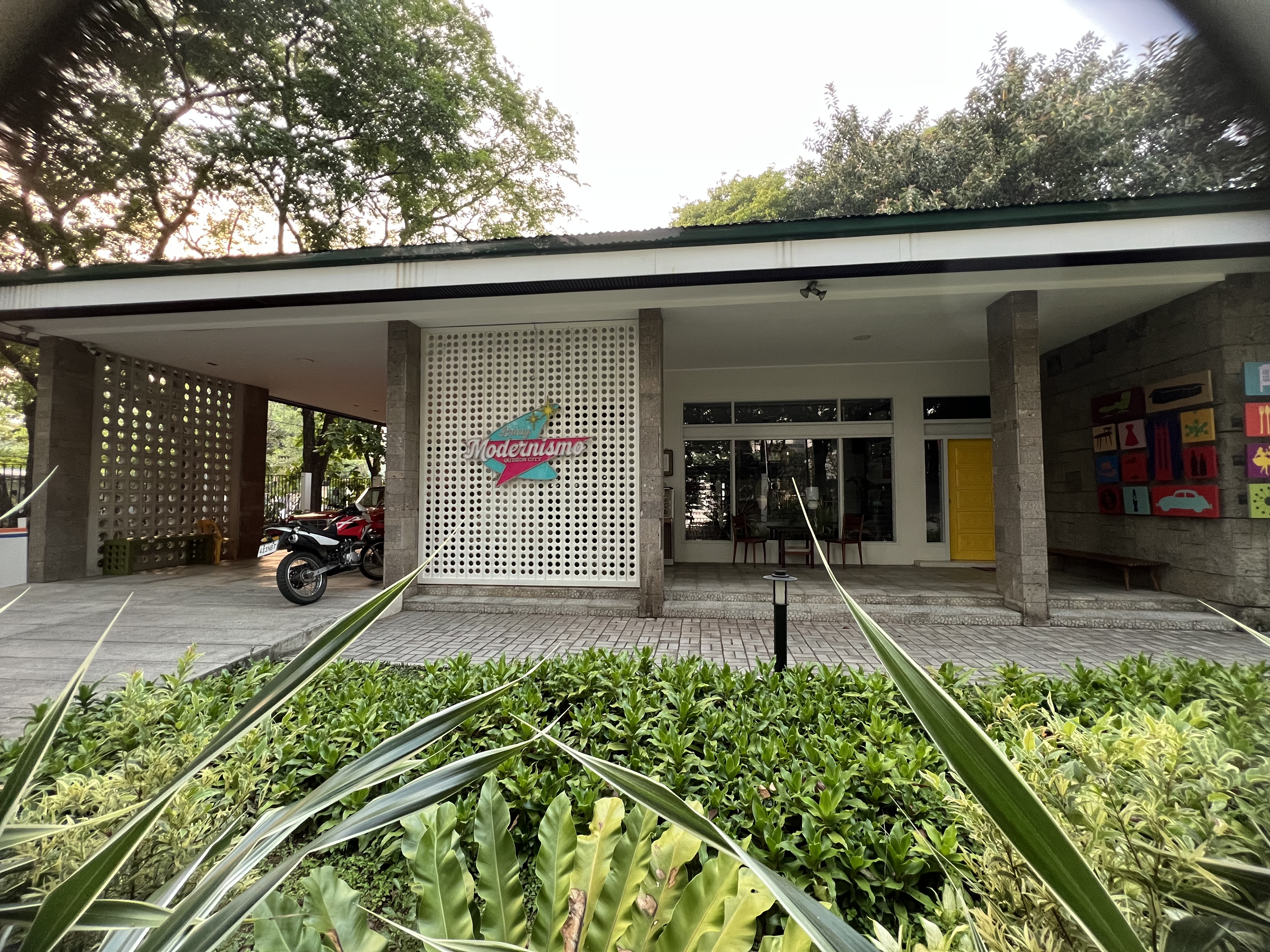
Balay Modernismo

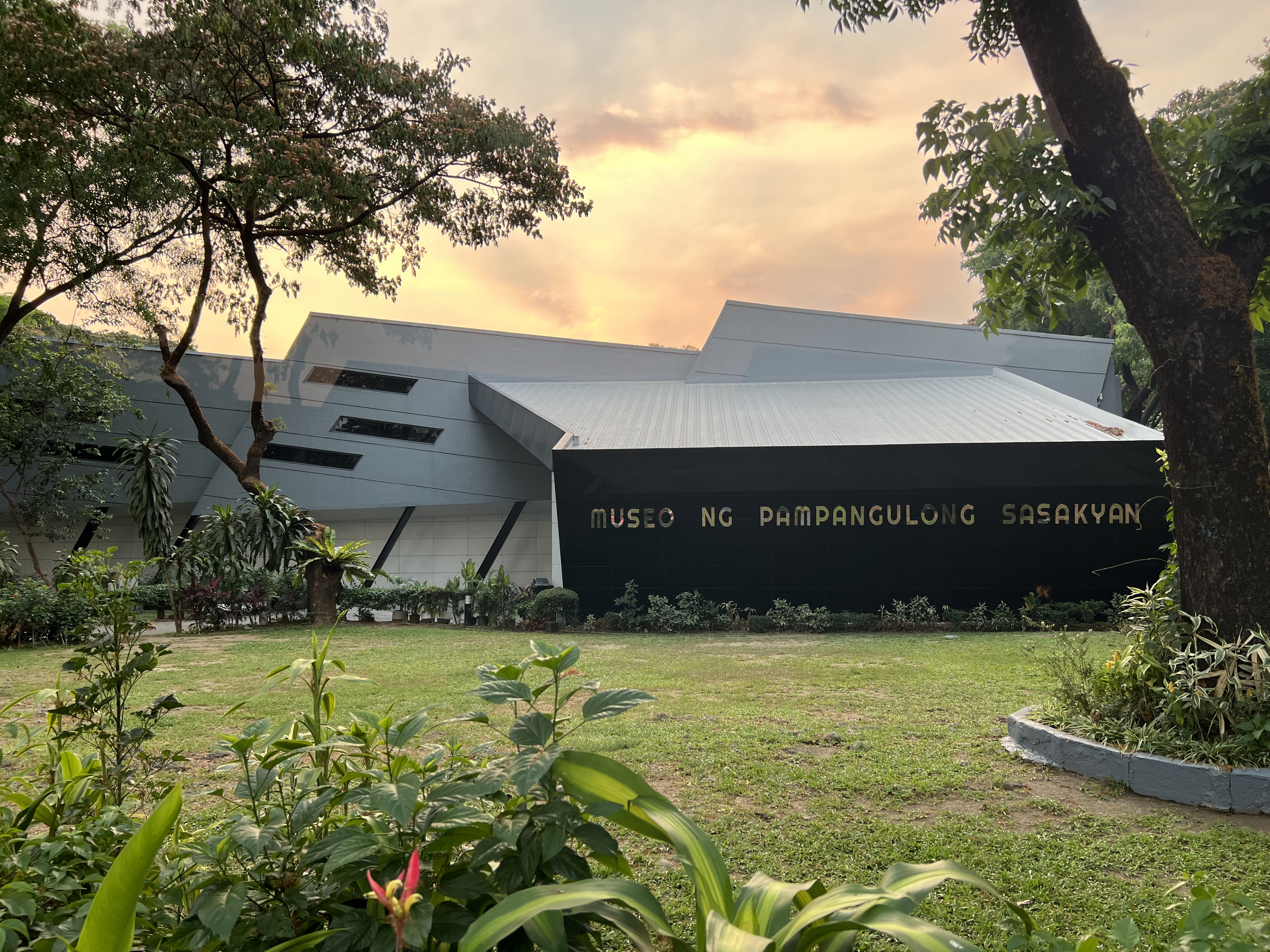
Presidential Car Museum

== See also ==
- List of parks in Metro Manila
- Manuel L. Quezon
- Quezon City
