= GSIS Museo ng Sining =

Art museum in Pasay, Philippines

GSIS Museum
- GSIS Museo ng Sining
- Established: April 23, 1996; 30 years ago
- Location: GSIS Building, Jose W. Diokno Boulevard, Bay City, Pasay, Metro Manila, Philippines
- Coordinates: 14°32′51″N 120°59′04″E
- Type: Art museum
- Collection size: 308 artworks (2011)
- Parking: On Site

The GSIS Museo ng Sining (English: GSIS Museum of Art) or the GSIS Museum is an art museum in Pasay, Metro Manila, Philippines established on April 23, 1996. It is located at the GSIS Building within the Financial Center Area of Bay City. The museum features artworks of Filipino artists from the colonial period to the contemporary period and also serves as an exhibit area for Filipino artists.

In December 2011, a total of 308 artworks are in the museum's collection.

Among its collections is a commissioned copy of Ritual Dance by Fernando Amorsolo-the original copy is lost in 1972, and the History of Philippine Music dated 1931. The Parisian Life by Juan Luna estimated in 2009 to value around P200 million, was formerly part of the museum's collections but was transferred to the National Museum of Fine Arts in 2012 along with other selected works.

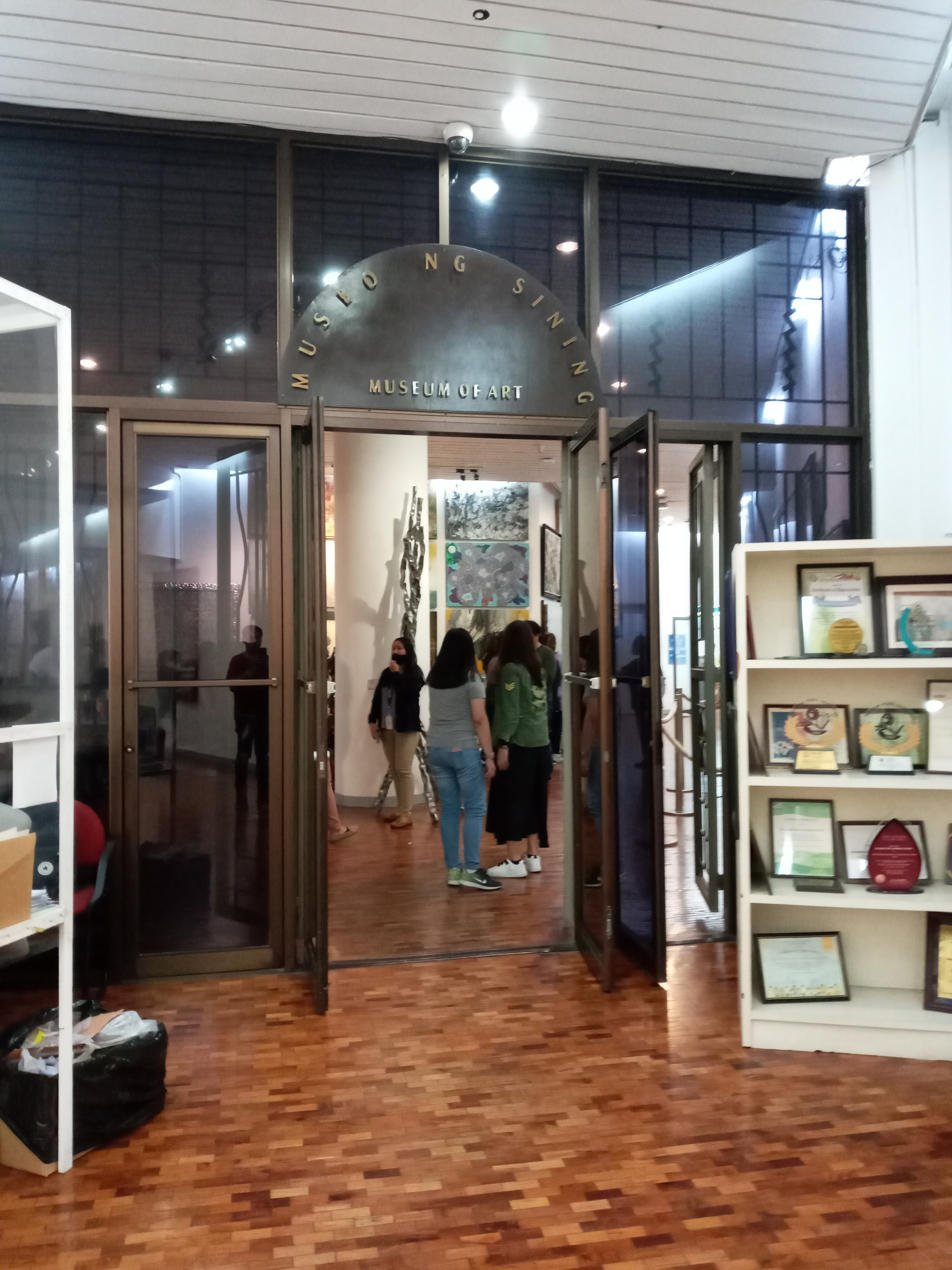
An entrance of the GSIS Museum, 2023
