= Gerard Lico =

Filipino academic and architect

Gerard Rey A. Lico is a Filipino architect, cultural critic, and academic best known as one of the foremost scholars of Philippine architectural history. Among the heritage buildings he has played a key role in conserving include the 1931 Manila Metropolitan Theater, the Rizal Memorial Coliseum, and various core buildings in the campus of the University of the Philippines Diliman where he is a full professor. He is also the author of numerous books, some of which are considered foundational texts in studies of Philippine architecture.

His 2008 book Arkitekturang Filipino: A History of Architecture and Urbanism in the Philippines is considered a foundational textbook for Filipino architecture students, expounding on the Philippines' built heritage from pre-colonial times to contemporary postcolonial approaches, and his 2003 work "Edifice Complex: Power, Myth, and Marcos State Architecture" is considered a defining text in the way architectural works during the Marcos dictatorship were used by the regime for propaganda purposes.

Among other awards, Lico received the Ten Outstanding Young Men of the Philippines award in 2004, was named one of the 50 Notable Architects in the Philippines by the United Architects of the Philippines in 2025, was recognized as Outstanding Professional of the Year for Architecture in 2022 by the Philippines' Professional Regulation Commission (PRC), was hailed as "Asia's Hero for Preserving Architectural Philippine Design" by the Asia's Modern Hero Awards in 2024.

== See also ==
- Edifice complex
