= Iglesia ni Cristo Museum (Quezon City) =

Ecclesiastical museum in Quezon City, Philippines

- Former name: Iglesia ni Cristo Museum and Gallery
- Established: 1984
- Location: 25 Central Avenue, New Era, Quezon City, Philippines
- Coordinates: 14°39′46″N 121°02′56″E
- Type: Ecclesiastical museum
- Curators: Bro. Cornelio Cortez, Jr.
- Owner: Felix Y. Manalo Foundation
- Building details
- Location in Metro Manila Location in Luzon Location in the Philippines

General information
- Inaugurated: August 26, 2019 (in current museum building)

Technical details
- Floor count: 5

Design and construction
- Architect: Francisco Mañosa

The Iglesia ni Cristo Museum is an ecclesiastical museum located in Quezon City and is owned and operated by the Iglesia ni Cristo (INC). Located in a building inaugurated in 2019, it is formerly located in the basement of the INC Central Temple. It features the history of the denomination and memorabilia of its founders.

== History ==
The basement of INC Central Temple, the primary house of worship of the Iglesia ni Cristo (INC), used to host a museum dedicated to the Christian indigenous denomination. The museum first opened in 1984. However due to lack of space, the museum was transferred to its own building.

The INC Museum was inaugurated on August 26, 2019 by INC Executive Minister Eduardo V. Manalo The concept for the museum took at least eight years to realize from the storyboard stage.

== Facilities ==
=== Building ===
The current museum is hosted in a five-storey building with a total floor area of 46,098.54 square meters (496,200.6 sq ft). The building was designed by Filipino architect Francisco Mañosa who is recognized as a National Artist of the Philippines.

Its facade has a signage which says "INC 1914", the initials of Iglesia ni Cristo and its foundation year. The facility also has a building management system which regulates lighting and other utilities.

=== Exhibits ===
The INC museum exhibits paintings, sculptures and other works of art depicting the beliefs and history of the Iglesia ni Cristo (Church Of Christ). Among its features are an interactive globe which showcase the location of the denomination' houses of worship. Walkalators are also installed for the museum's visitors. It also has a children's museum. The museum is open to both members and non-members of the Church Of Christ.

== Management ==
The INC Museum has direct relations to the Iglesia ni Cristo. In itself it is a non-profit cultural and educational institution. The Felix Y. Manalo Foundation which serves as the religious group's socio-cultural arm operates and manages the museum.
