= Federico Ilustre =

Filipino architect

Federico Ilustre (1912–1989) was a Filipino architect who worked for the Bureau of Public Works (now the Department of Public Works and Highways). It was during his tenure as consulting architect that some of the country's prominent postwar architectural structures were built.

== Life ==
Quezon Memorial Shrine

Ilustre graduated with a degree in architecture at the Mapua Institute of Technology, eventually becoming a licensed architect in 1937. His architectural experience however went way back, when he started out in 1935 as a draftsman in the architectural office of Juan Nakpil, as well as a stint as a furniture designer in 1936 for Puyat and Sons.

He first joined the Bureau of Public Works in 1936 as a draftsman, staying in that position until the outbreak of World War II in the country in 1941. He was then promoted to the position of consulting architect iduring the Japanese Occupation. After the war, he briefly left the bureau to join the AFWESPAC of the US Army as supervising architect and assist them in the postwar infrastructure rehabilitation. In 1947, he became the supervising architect of the National Housing Commission, a position he held for two years until he returned to the Bureau of Public Works in 1949 also as supervising architect. He would remain with the public works office until the 1970s.

His most notable work would be his design of the Quezon Memorial Shrine monument, a design he made for a national design competition held in 1951 for the then-planned monument for late President Manuel L. Quezon, where he won the grand prize. In addition, he also designed some notable postwar structures, varying in architectural styles from high-modernism to the neo-vernacular.

== Death ==
Federico Ilustre died in 1989 in Manila, Philippines.

== Works ==
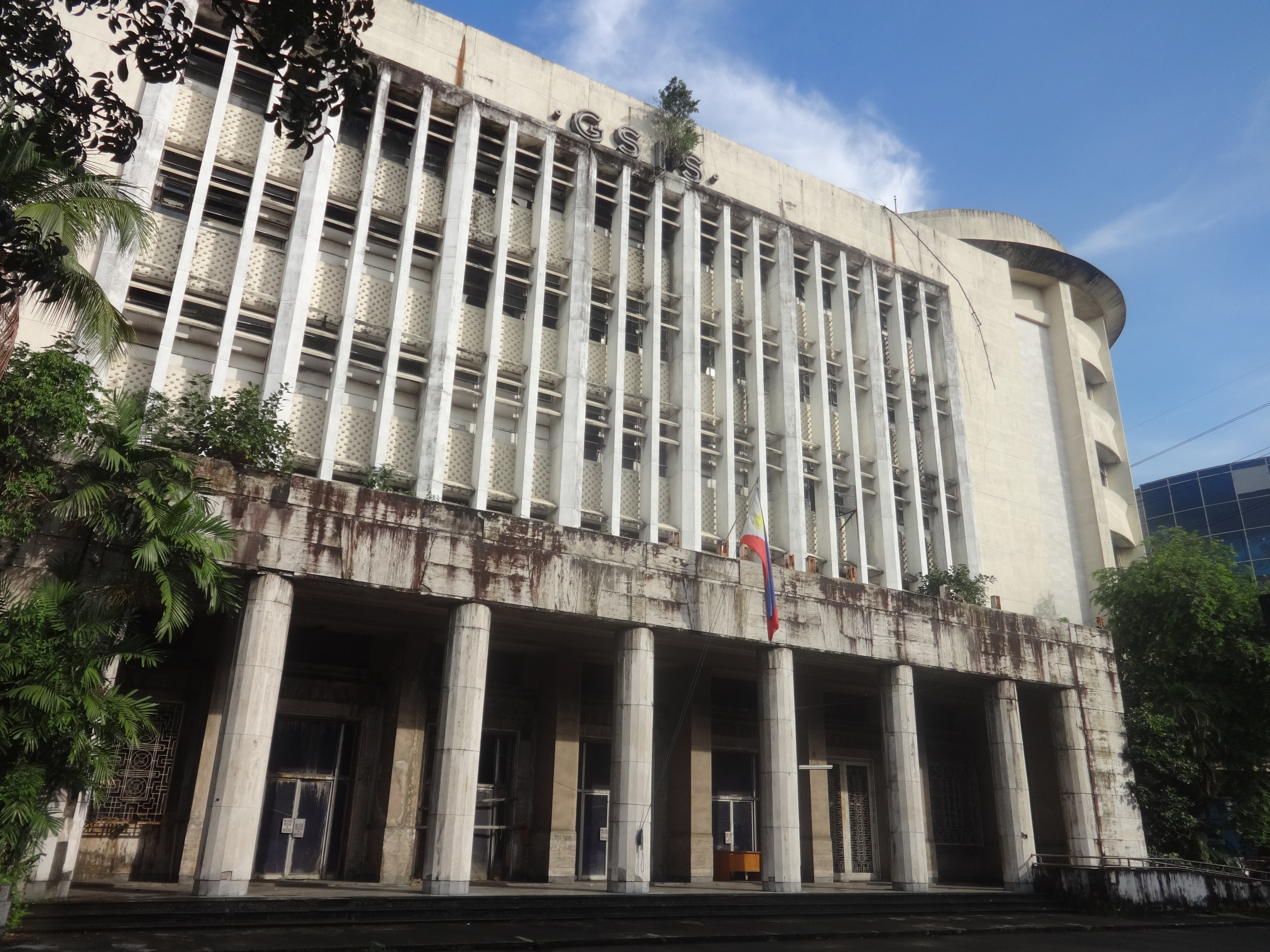
Former GSIS headquarters in Manila

- Quezon Memorial Shrine, Quezon City, 1978
- former GSIS Headquarters Building, Manila, 1957
- Veterans Memorial Building, Manila, 1957 (Demolished 2007)
- Independence Grandstand (now Quirino Grandstand), Rizal Park, Manila, 1949
- Manila International Airport, Nichols Field, 1961 (demolished; currently the site of Ninoy Aquino International Airport Terminal 2)
- Department of Agriculture Building, Quezon City
- National Housing Authority Building, Quezon City
- Planetarium, Rizal Park, Manila
