= QCX Museum =

Interactive museum in Quezon City, Philippines

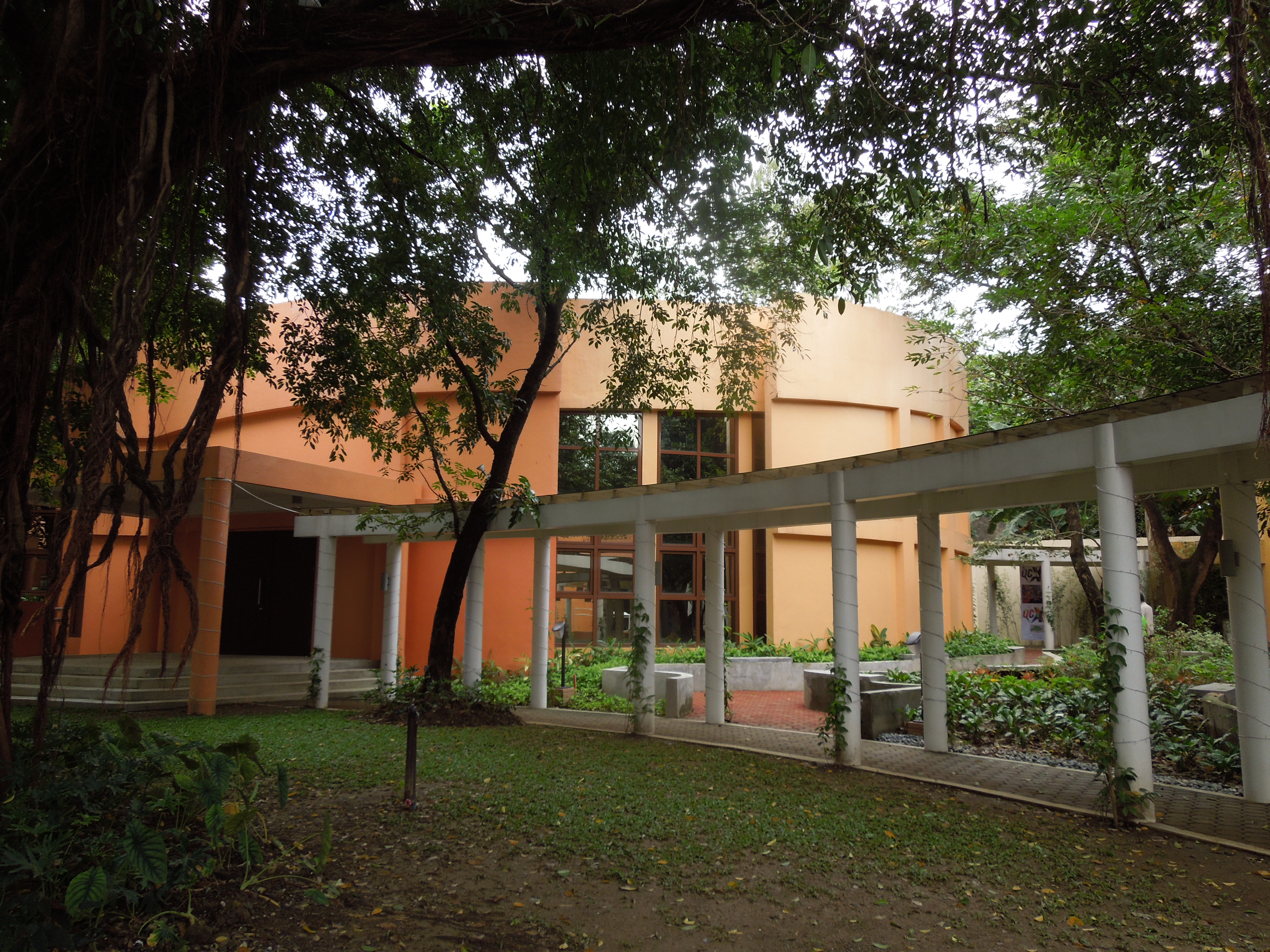
- Established: November 9, 2015
- Location: Quezon Memorial Circle, Quezon City
- Coordinates: 14°39′05″N 121°03′04″E
- Type: Interactive museum
- Owner: Quezon City Government

Building details

General information
- Status: Completed
- Groundbreaking: January 2, 2012
- Inaugurated: November 9, 2015

Technical details
- Floor area: 6,229.21 m^{2} (67,050.7 sq ft)

Design and construction
- Main contractor: Hilmarc’s Construction Corporation

The Quezon City Museum Complex, more commonly known as the QCX Museum or the Quezon City Experience Museum, is an interactive and socio-cultural green building-compliant city museum which was inaugurated on November 9, 2015, within the Quezon Memorial Circle in Quezon City, Metro Manila, Philippines. QCX primarily displays the history and culture of Quezon City. It is touted as the first interactive museum of the city. The museum's concept was conceived in 2006.

== Facilities ==
The museum allows its visitors to have interactions with the display, take selfies on each of the museum's galleries and shoot and watch themselves on videotape. The museum complex composes of five pods, and had plans to add coffee shop and a small cafeteria and memorabilia store at the lobby. The museum hosts a small theater which has a seating capacity of 80-90 people and a 60-seat lecture room, both which is available for rent.

The following five buildings form part of the museum complex:

- Gallery A – 335.46 m^{2} (3,610.9 sq ft)
- Gallery B – 2,382.28 m^{2} (25,642.6 sq ft)
- Gallery C – 609.9 m^{2} (6,565 sq ft)
- Administrative Building – 640.31 m^{2} (6,892.2 sq ft)
- Business Center – 1,265.25 m^{2} (13,619.0 sq ft)

== Closure ==
The museum was indefinitely closed during the COVID-19 pandemic in 2020 and its building was converted into a COVID testing center.

In March 2023, the museum building was converted by the Department of Social Welfare and Development (DSWD) and converted into a field site for cash aid applications.

The Cinema Museum of the Philippines (Filipino: Pambansang Museo Ng Pelikulang Pilipino) will be opened within the QCX Museum.
