= Presidential Car Museum =

Museum in Quezon City, Philippines

- Museo ng Pampangulong Sasakyan (Filipino)
- Location: Quezon Memorial Circle, Quezon City
- Coordinates: 14°39′0.7″N 121°03′3.8″E
- Curator: Ryan Tan
- Building details

General information
- Status: Open
- Groundbreaking: 2017
- Inaugurated: August 19, 2018

The Presidential Car Museum (Filipino: Museo ng Pampangulong Sasakyan) is a museum within the Quezon Memorial Circle in Quezon City, Metro Manila, Philippines. The museum displays cars used by the former Philippine Presidents.

== History ==
The National Historical Commission of the Philippines was planning to open a museum to house the presidential cars of former Philippine Presidents as early as 2013.

The NHCP secured a location for the museum when it signed a memorandum of agreement with the local government of Quezon City. The city provided at least 3,000 square meters (32,000 sq ft) of space for the museum. The land within the Quezon Memorial Circle where the museum was built was formerly occupied by basketball and volleyball courts which was moved to another part of the park at the NHCP's expense.

The museum was formally inaugurated on August 19, 2018.

== Collection ==
The museum displays the National Historical Commission of the Philippines collection of cars used by former Presidents of the Philippines during their term of office, restored to their original condition. Prior to the opening of the museum, the vehicles were housed in a private warehouse in Pampanga.

- 1924 Packard Single Six Touring Model 233 used by President Emilio Aguinaldo.
  - In service: 1924–1964
- 1937 Chrysler Airflow Custom Imperial CW used by President Manuel L. Quezon.
  - In service: 1937–1941
- 1941 Packard 180 used by President José P. Laurel and President Sergio Osmeña.
  - In service: 1941–1946
- 1940 Cadillac Fleetwood Series 75 used by President Manuel Róxas.
  - In service: 1946–1948
- 1953 Chrysler Crown Imperial used by President Elpidio Quirino.
  - In service: 1948–1953
- 1955 Cadillac Series 75-23 Fleetwood used by President Ramón Magsaysay.
  - In service: 1953–1957
- 1959 Cadillac de Ville similar to the one used by President Diosdado Macapagal.
  - In service: 1961–1965
- 1980 Lincoln Continental Mark VI used by President Ferdinand Marcos.
  - In service: 1980–1986
- Mercedes-Benz 500 SEL used by President Corazon Aquino.
  - In service: 1986–1992
- Mercedes-Benz 500 SEL Guard used by President Fidel V. Ramos.
  - In service: 1986–1992
- Mercedes-Benz S600 used by President Joseph Estrada.
  - In service: 1993–2001
- Mercedes-Benz S600 (LWB) used by President Gloria Macapagal Arroyo.
  - In service: 1993–2001

Other vehicles:

- 1935 Cadillac V-16 used by President Manuel Quezon as his presidential car and soon turned over to General Douglas MacArthur in 1937.
  - In service: 1935–1936
- 1943 Willy's Jeep donated by General Douglas MacArthur and used by Ramón Magsaysay during his tenure as Secretary of National Defense.
  - In service: 1950–1953
- 1960 Rolls-Royce Phantom V owned by Imelda Marcos.
  - In service: 1965–1986
- a kalesa owned by the family of León Apacible, a member of the commission that drafted the Malolos Constitution.

== Gallery ==
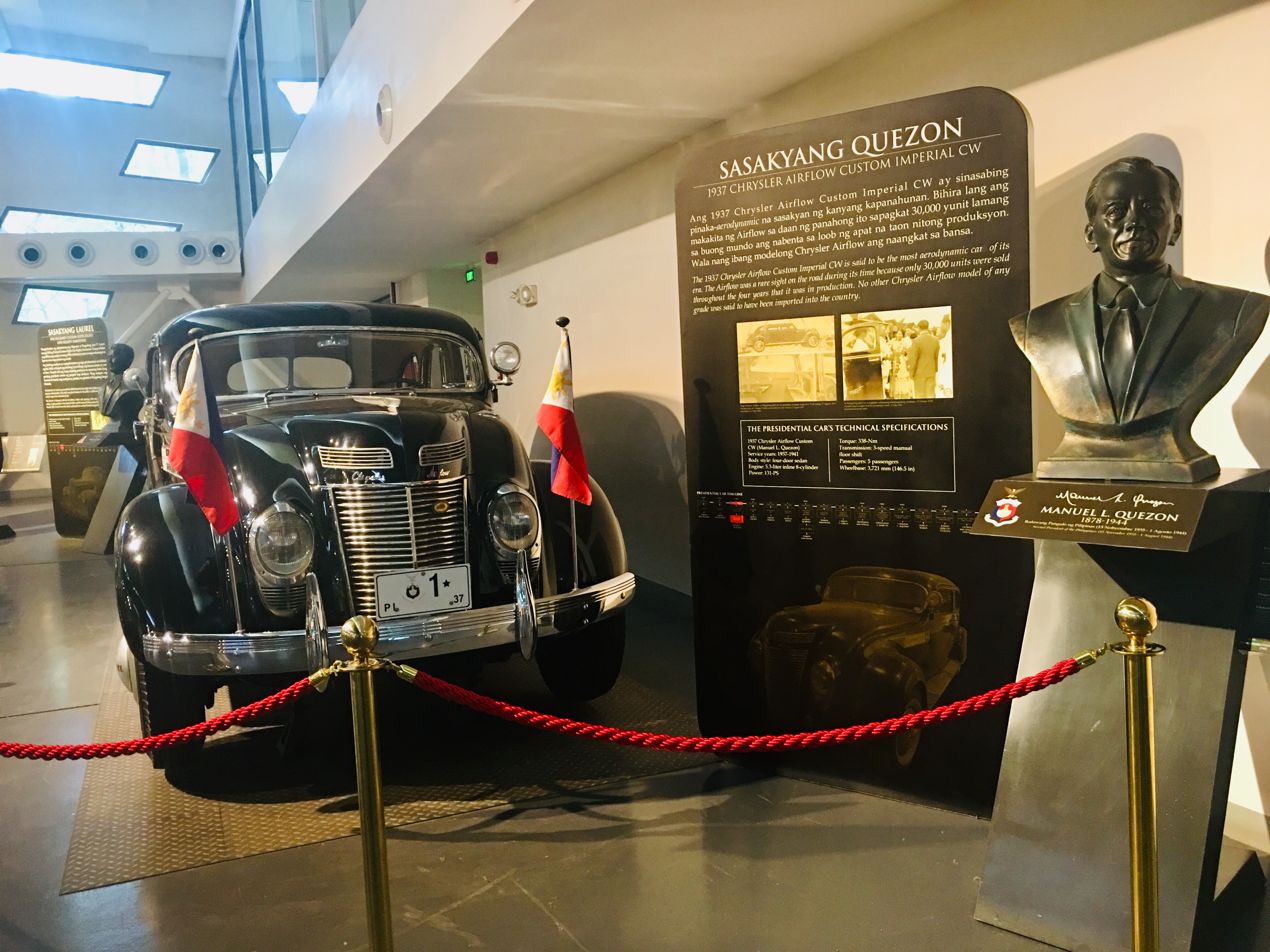
Presidential car of Manuel Quezon

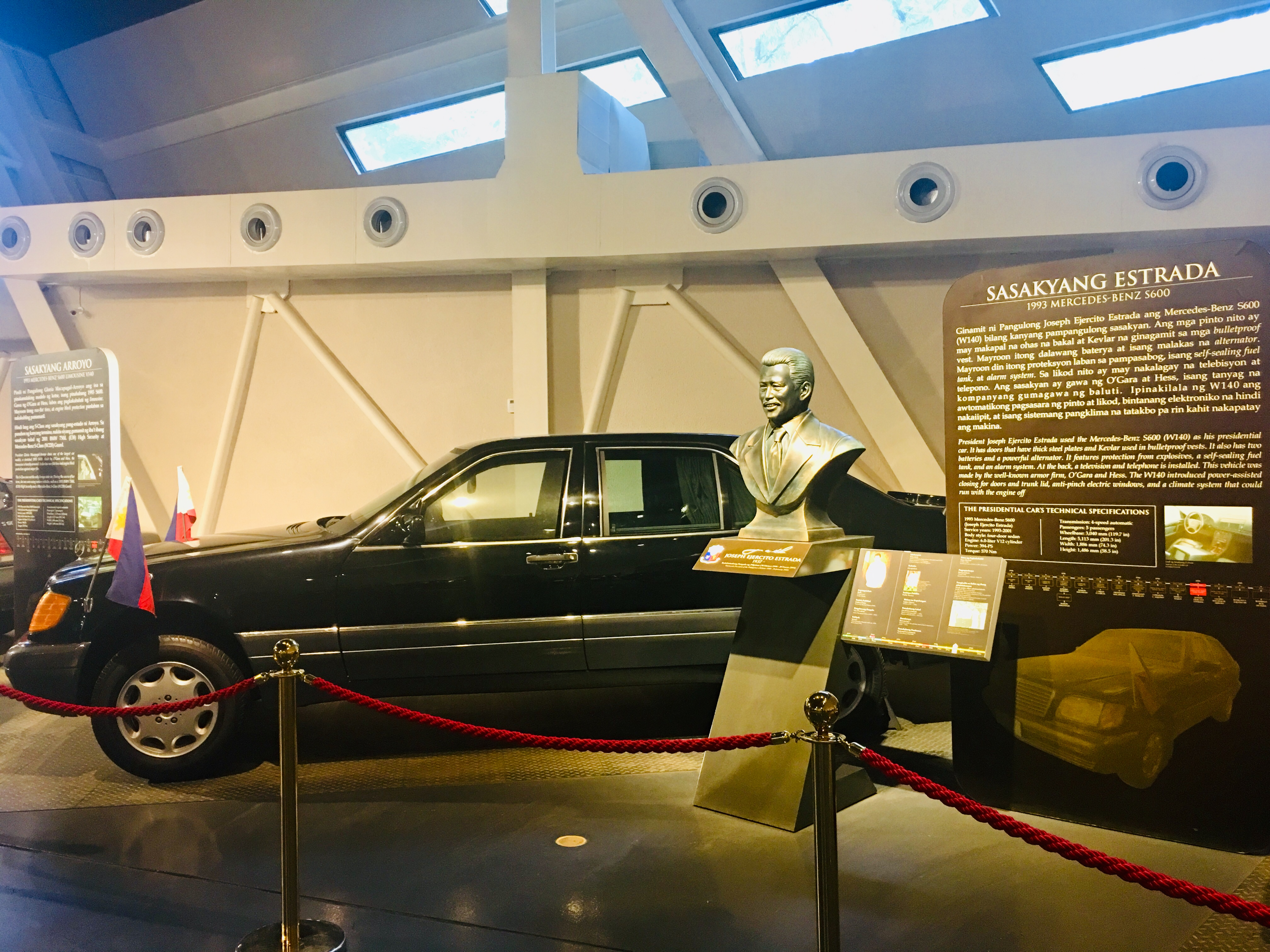
Presidential car of Joseph Estrada

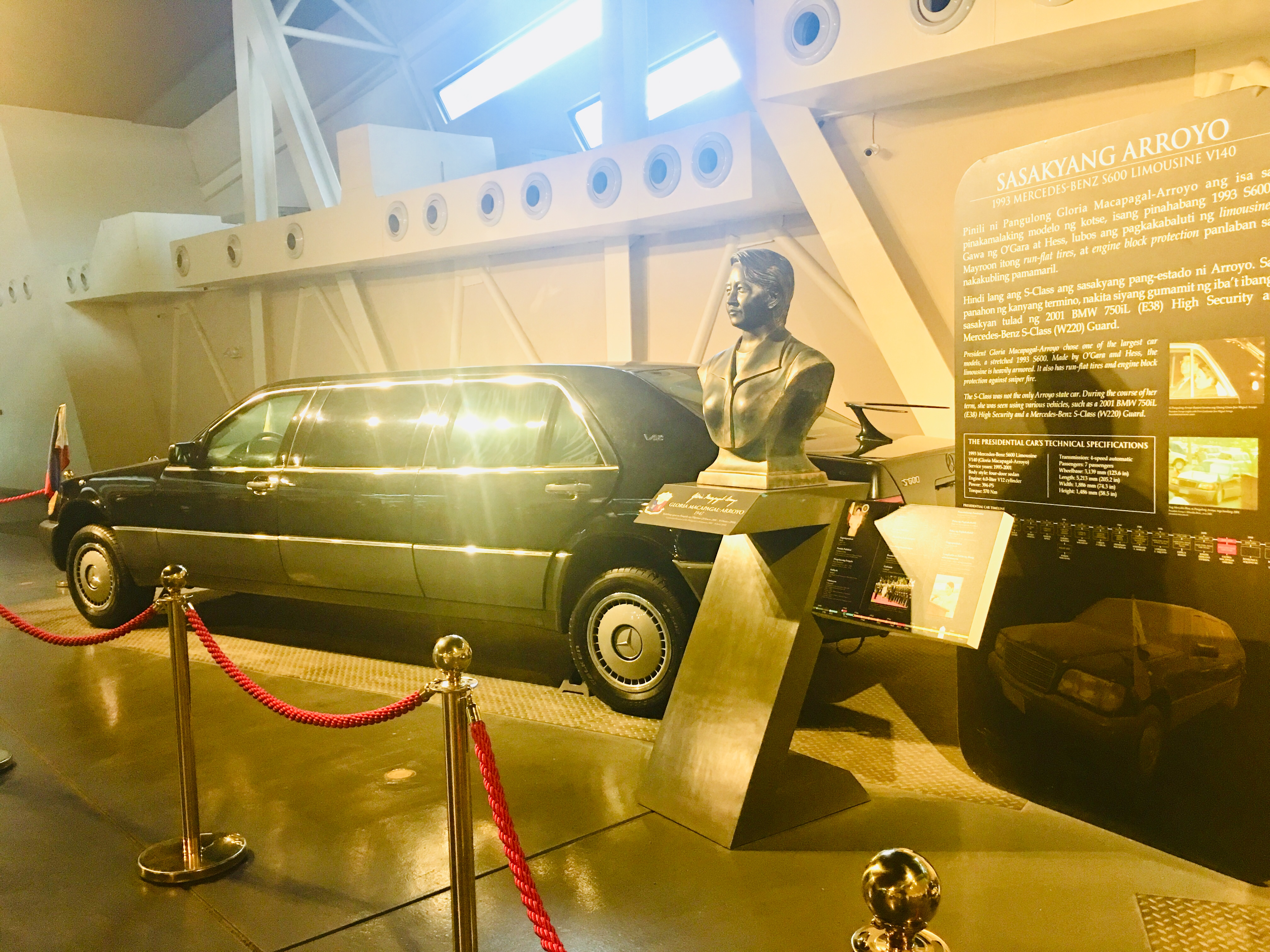
Presidential car of Gloria Macapagal Arroyo

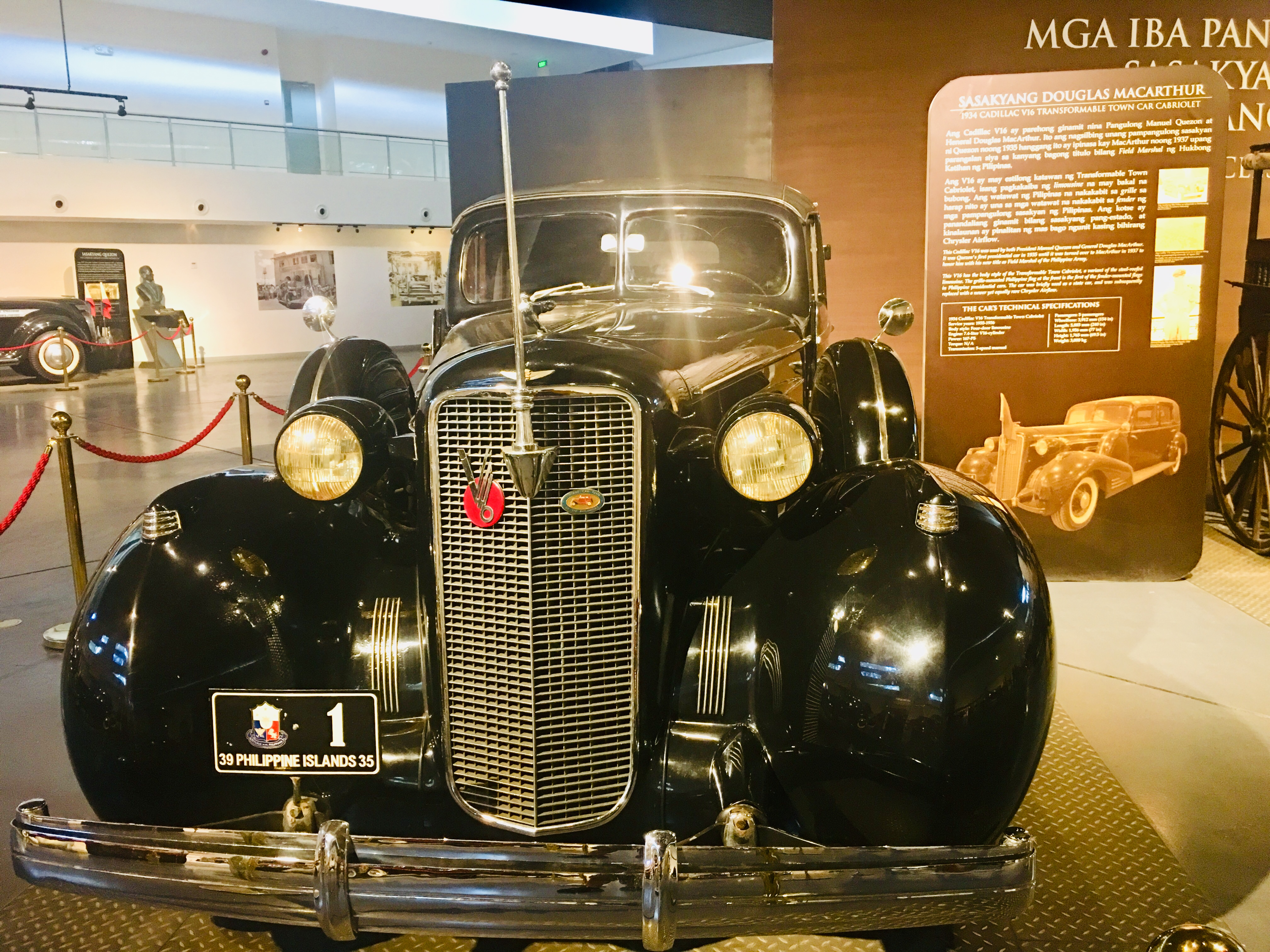
First presidential car of Manuel Quezon turned over to General Douglas MacArthur
