= Quezon Memorial Shrine =

Monument and national shrine in Quezon City, Philippines

- Pambansang Pang-alaalang Dambana ni Quezon (Filipino)
- The monument in 2026
- Interactive map of Quezon Memorial Shrine
- Location: Quezon Memorial Circle, Quezon City
- Coordinates: 14°39′03″N 121°02′54″E
- Designer: Federico Ilustre
- Type: Mausoleum, museum
- Height: 66 meters (217 ft)
- Beginning date: 1952
- Completion date: 1978
- Dedicated to: Manuel L. Quezon, second president of the Philippines

The Quezon Memorial Shrine (Filipino: Pambansang Pang-alaalang Dambana ni Quezon, lit. 'National Memorial Shrine of Quezon') is a monument and national shrine dedicated to Manuel L. Quezon, the second president of the Philippines, located within the Quezon Memorial Circle in Quezon City. It also houses a museum in its base.

== History ==
The Quezon Memorial Committee, which was tasked to organize a nationwide fund-raising campaign for the building of a monument dedicated to the late President Manuel Quezon, was established by virtue of Executive Order No. 79 signed by his successor, President Sergio Osmeña on December 17, 1945. President Elpidio Quirino later proposed the relocation of the monument away from its original site, but such plans were abandoned The Bureau of Public Works began construction on the monument in 1952.

The monument was placed under the jurisdiction of the National Historical Institute through Presidential Decree No. 1 issued by President Ferdinand Marcos on September 24, 1972.

On January 14, 1974, the monument was formally designated a national shrine and inaugurated on August 19, 1978. The remains of former President Quezon was transferred to the shrine from Manila North Cemetery on August 1, 1979. The remains of his First Lady, Aurora Aragon Quezon, were likewise reinterred in the shrine on April 28, 2005. On March 12, 2020, the shrine was recognized by the National Historical Commission of the Philippines as a National Cultural Treasure (NCT), but the declaration was only made public in December 2021.

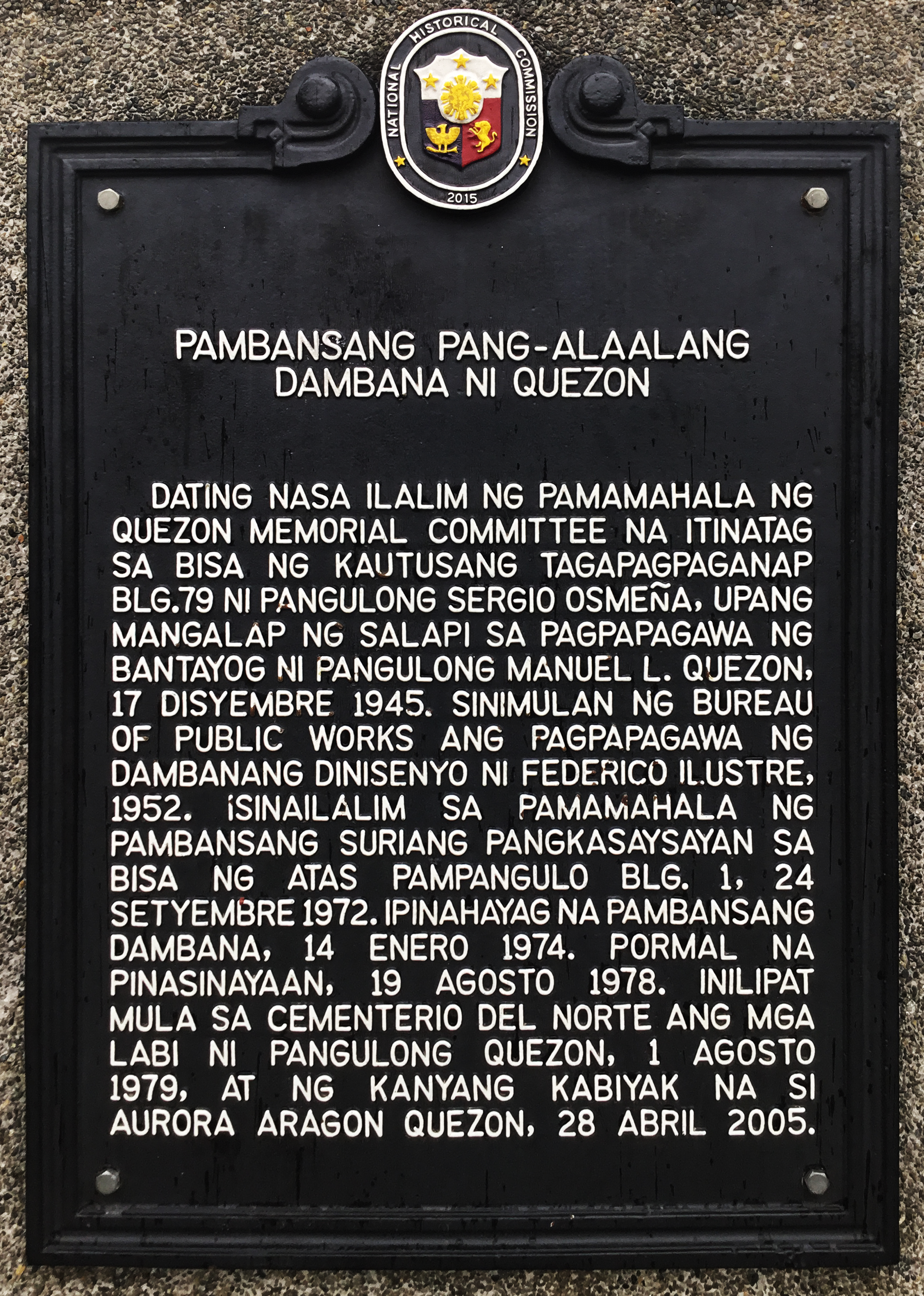
National Historical Commission historical marker

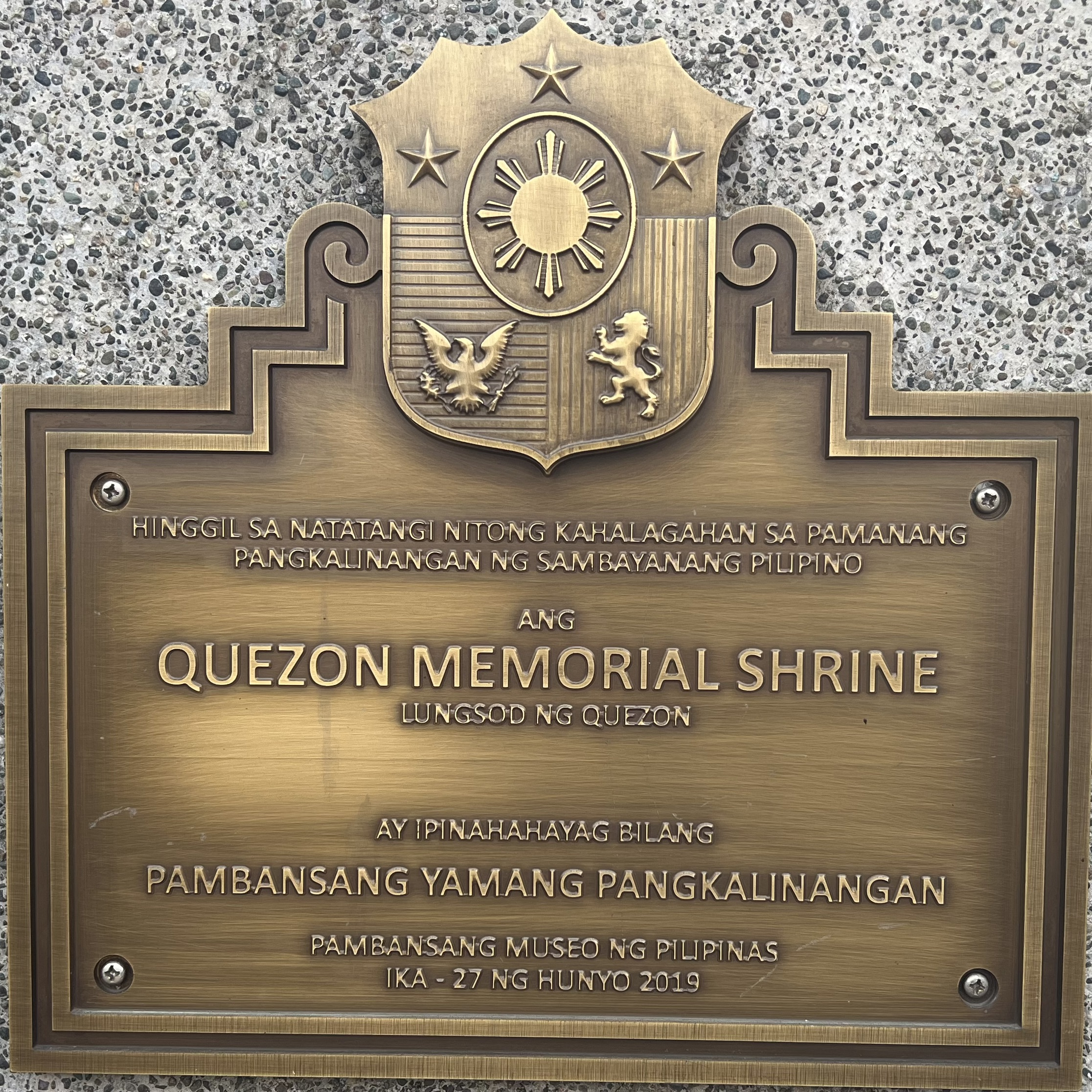
National Cultural Treasure marker

== Architecture and design ==
The Quezon Memorial Shrine was designed by Federico Ilustre. The 66-meter (217 ft) monument is composed of three connected pylons and is located at the center of the Quezon Memorial Circle, a major park in Quezon City. An observation deck, currently closed to the public, is at the top of the structure, and enables a maximum of 60 people to enjoy panoramic views of the city. A spiral staircase connects the deck to the base of the structure.

The three pylons are surmounted by three, large Art Deco angels by Italian sculptor Francesco Riccardo Monti. With wingtips pointing heavenward and heads bowed in grief, the angels all hold wreaths of sampaguita (Jasminum sambac), the national flower). The angels represent the three major island groups of the Philippines: Luzon, the Visayas, and Mindanao; this is visually reinforced by each figure wearing a traditional dress from their respective region.

Under the watch of former Quezon City Mayor Tomás Morató, the monument was beautified with Carrara marble by Amberti, an Italian architect he had hired. Morató’s successors replaced the Italian marble with local marble.

== Museum ==
Museo ni Manuel L. Quezon
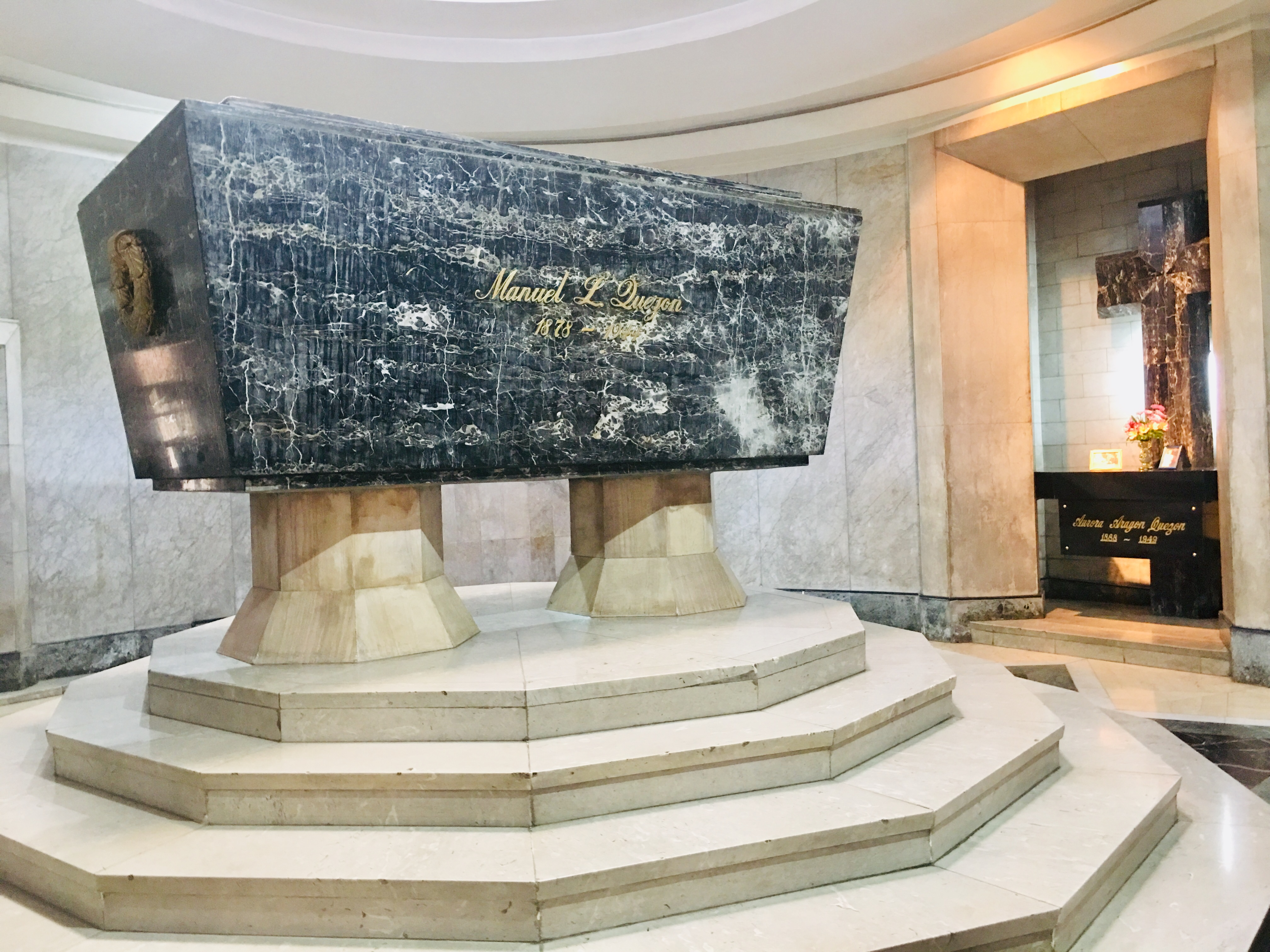
- Sarcophagi housing the remains of President Quezon and his wife
- Location: Quezon Memorial Shrine, Quezon City
- Key holdings: Sarcophagus of Manuel L. Quezon
- Parking: On site

At the base of the Quezon Memorial Shrine is the Museo ni Manuel L. Quezon (lit. 'Museum of Manuel L. Quezon'), a museum that has a collection of relics and memorabilia related to former President Manuel Quezon, as well as a mausoleum which houses the interred remains of Quezon and his wife Aurora Aragon Quezon. The museum underwent a renovation by the National Historical Commission of the Philippines and was reopened on August 19, 2015, the former President’s birth anniversary.

Other features of the museum include a hologram of Quezon delivering his inaugural speech, and interactive booths and terminals on the Commonwealth Era over which he ruled. The museum also has an audio-visual room screening a short documentary on Quezon and the museum, a gallery dedicated to Quezon's wife, Aurora, and a replica of Quezon's presidential office.

== Gallery ==
Ground-level view of Quezon Memorial Shrine

Quezon Memorial Shrine at night

Quezon Memorial Shrine in 2019

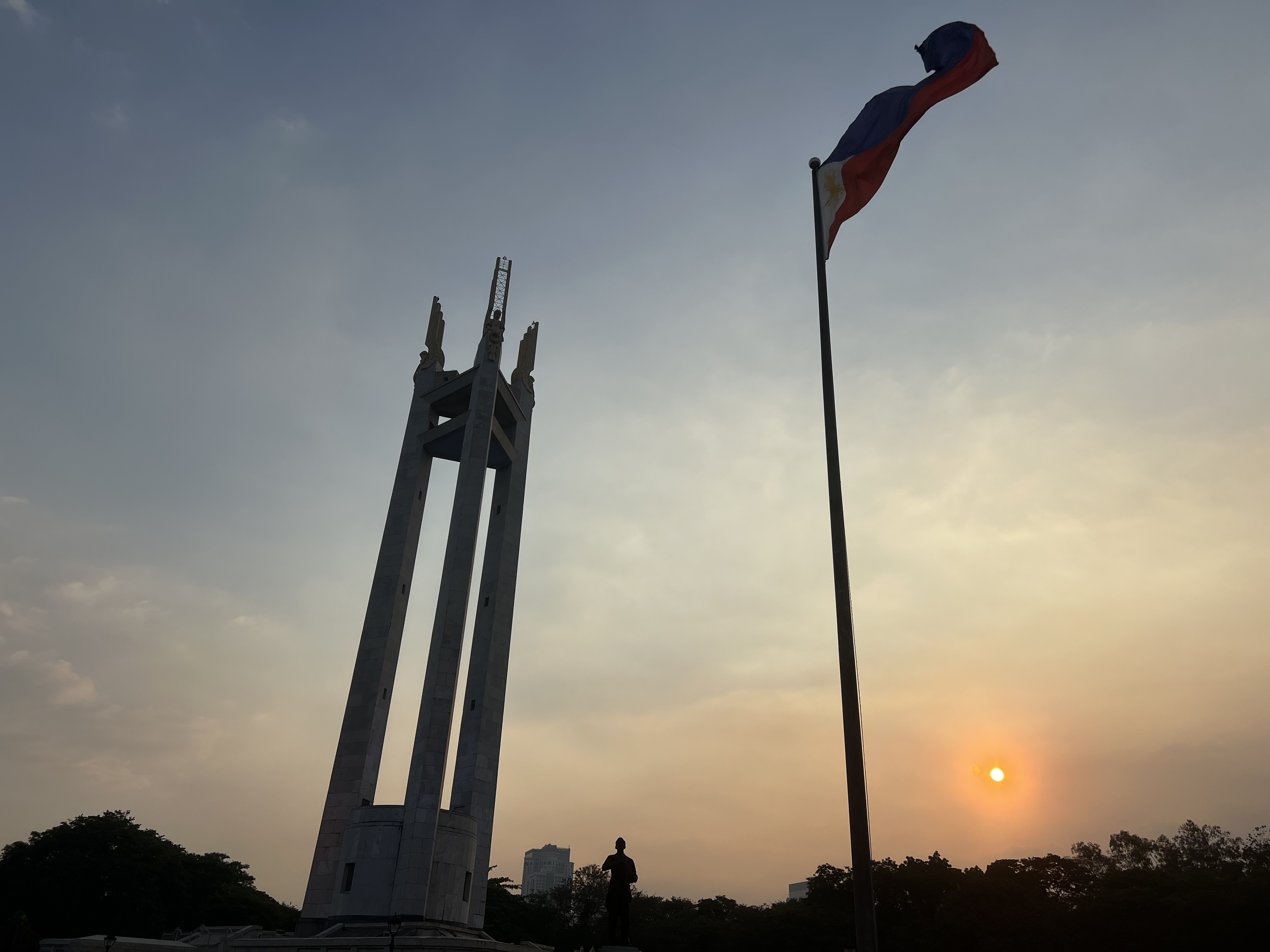
Quezon Memorial Shrine at dusk

Quezon Memorial Shrine at golden hour

Aerial view of Quezon Memorial Shrine in 2010
