= Bernardo Park =

Park in Quezon City, Philippines

Coordinates: 14°37′43″N 121°2′45″E

- Interactive map of Bernardo Park
- Type: Urban park
- Location: Quezon City, Philippines
- Area: 1.5 hectares (15,000 m^{2})
- Created: February 19, 1948
- Operator: Quezon City Parks Development and Administration Department
- Status: Opened
- Public transit: E Mega Q-Mart

Bernardo Park is an urban community park located on both banks of the Diliman Creek in Quezon City, Metro Manila, Philippines. It is the first public park in Quezon City which opened in 1948. The park is the social and cultural center of the barangay Pinagkaisahan and the largest park in barangay Kamuning. It was named after Ponciano Bernardo, the second mayor of Quezon City who was also the city's first vice-mayor and city engineer appointed by President Manuel L. Quezon.

== History ==
The park was developed by the Quezon City government during the tenure of Ponciano Bernardo, which appropriated ₱19,000 (equivalent to ₱2,350,884 in 2021) for the project. It was carved out of a hill along the Diliman Creek, also known as Lagarian Creek, at the border of Diliman and Cubao districts. The plan includes building a skating rink, an artificial lagoon, a zoo, and other features that would rival Rizal Park. It was to be located near the old Quezon City Hall which was then being built on the south bank of the creek. The park, designed by Luciano V. Aquino, the same architect who designed the Welcome Rotonda, was inaugurated on February 19, 1948.

On June 25, 1949, President Elpidio Quirino laid the cornerstone of the Aurora Quezon Memorial Hall in the park with Zenaida Quezon-Buencamino, Manuel Quezon Jr. and Josefina M. Bernardo, the wife of Mayor Ponciano Bernardo, as guests of honor. It was dedicated in memory of former First Lady Aurora Quezon who, along with Mayor Ponciano Bernardo and several others, were killed two months earlier in an ambush in Nueva Ecija.

During the 1950s until mid-1960s, radio and television broadcast were aired live from the park. It was also often used as a filming location by local movie outfit Sampaguita Pictures.

In 1968, the Quezon City Main Public Library moved from its old location at the original Quezon City Hall building on EDSA and Aurora Boulevard in Cubao to the building at the Kamuning side of the park donated by Lions Clubs International. When the City Hall moved to its present location along Elliptical Road in Diliman in 1972, the library became the QC Library and Information Center Cubao Branch. Several facilities were added to the park over the years, including the public swimming pool which opened in 1990 and placed under the management of the Quezon City Youth and Sports Development Office.

On December 3, 2010, Mayor Herbert Bautista unveiled the Ponciano Bernardo Monument and Marker to honor and recognize the former mayor's contributions to the city.

== Description ==
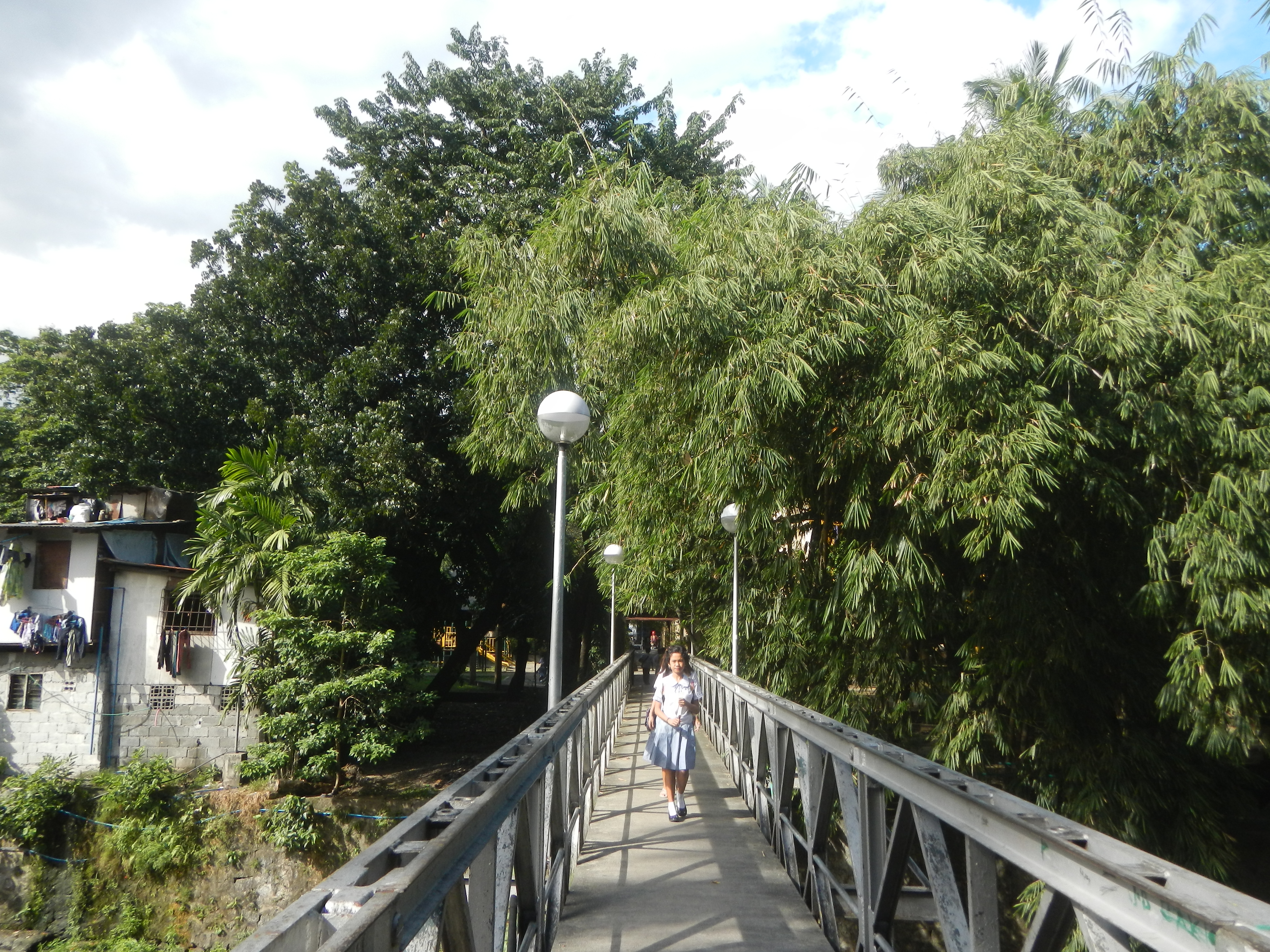
A footbridge connects both sides of the park over the Diliman (Lagarian) Creek

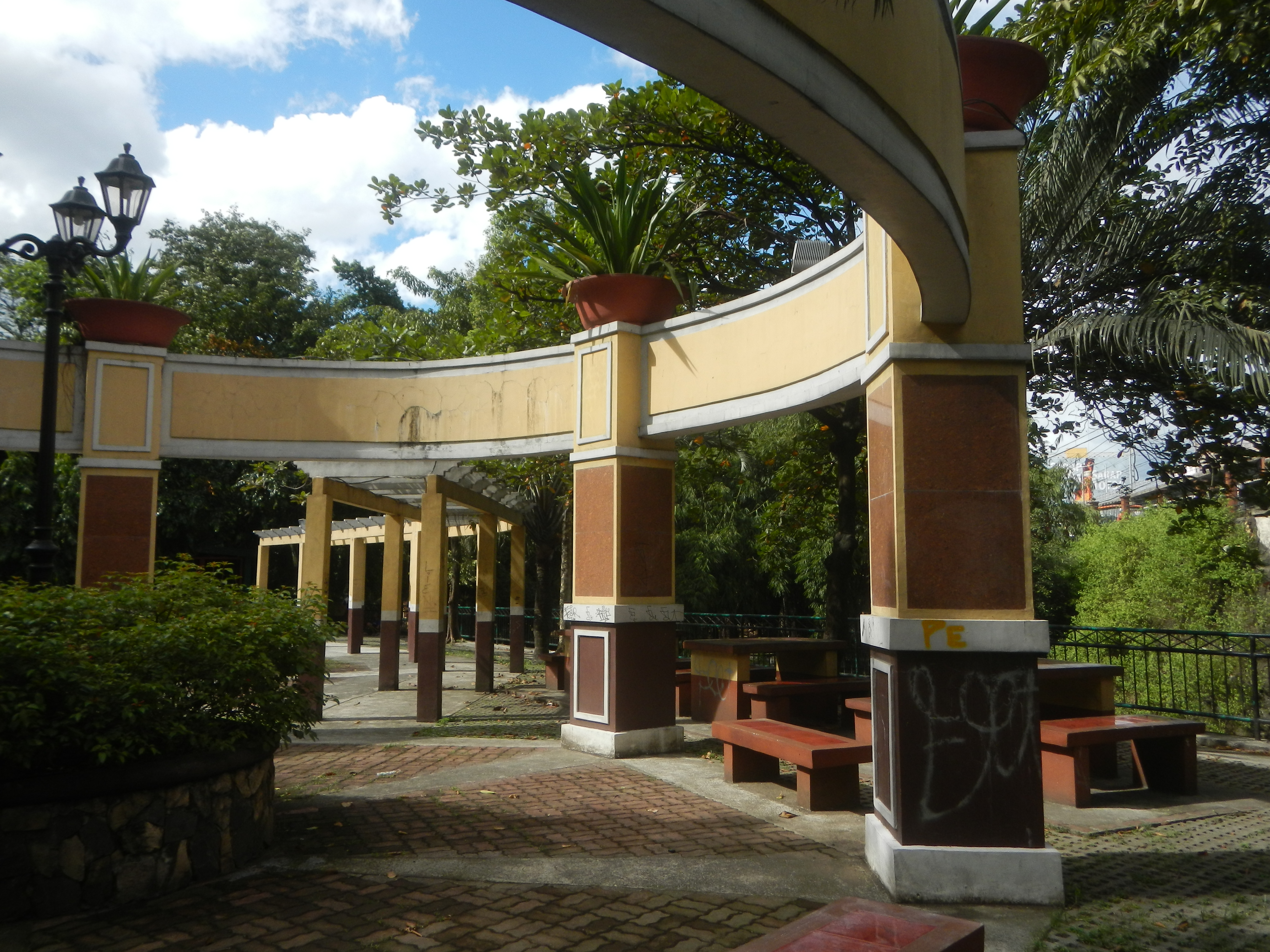
The southern side of Bernardo Park in Pinagkaisahan

Bernardo Park is located along the western side of Epifanio de los Santos Avenue (EDSA) between Ermin Garcia Street in Pinagkaisahan in the south and K-3rd Street in Kamuning in the north. The larger portion of the park is on the north bank in Kamuning where it is surrounded by a few government buildings such as the Kamuning Police Station 10 of the Quezon City Police District, a training center of the Technical Education and Skills Development Authority (TESDA) and the Quezon City Jail. Located in the Kamuning side is a basketball court which also serves as venue for community gatherings, and across it is the swimming pool which was rehabilitated in 2005 under then Mayor Feliciano Belmonte Jr. The northern side also contains a skating and biking area, as well as a children's playground.

The park's southern side in Pinagkaisahan contains a picnic area and the Ponciano Bernardo monument. It is bordered by the Ramon Magsaysay (Cubao) High School which replaced the old city hall, and the Klinika Bernardo and Social Hygiene Clinic, a publicly funded HIV prevention, testing and treatment center. Just across EDSA from the Pinagkaisahan park is Nepa Q-Mart, also known as Mega Q-Mart, one of the largest wholesale flea markets in Metro Manila. Also located in the vicinity is the Bernardo Park Compound, a slum area which in 2007 sheltered 100 families. Many of these informal settlers work as vendors in Nepa Q-Mart. There are also informal settlements along the Meralco-Botocan power line and K-6th Street in the Kamuning side, and along Ermin Garcia and Maryland Streets in Pinagkaisahan, including some in the riverbanks and under the EDSA bridge.
