= Project HUB =

Planned public transport terminal in Quezon City, Philippines

General information
- Location: Elliptical Rd., Cor. Commonwealth Ave. Quezon City, Metro Manila, Philippines
- System: Intermodal
- Connections: Future: Quezon Memorial Circle; University Avenue

Construction
- Parking: 300

History
- Opened: 2027 (projected)

Project HUB is a proposed public transport terminal in Quezon City, Metro Manila, Philippines.

== History ==
The Metropolitan Manila Development Authority (MMDA) in May 2024, have reportedly looked into the lot of the Government Service Insurance System (GSIS) near the Quezon Memorial Circle for a possible site of an integrated transport hub.

The Department of Transportation (DOTr), the GSIS, the MMDA and the Quezon City government met on October 15, 2024, to discuss their commitment on building an intermodal rail-city bus terminal and depot in Quezon City. This is a response to a presidential directive to construct one with the GSIS committing its lot near the Quezon Memorial Circle.

The DOTr along with the World Bank will plan, finance and build the transport hub. The MMDA will conduct feasibility studies on traffic management and basic engineering design.

It is projected to be complete by 2027.

== Location ==
Project HUB will be built at a lot at the corner of the intersection linking Elliptical Road and Commonwealth Avenue The intermodal hub is said to rival the scale of the Parañaque Integrated Terminal Exchange (PITX) in Parañaque. It is projected to also connect commuters using the yet to be opened Quezon Memorial Circle and University Avenue stations of MRT Line 7
