= MRT Line 8 (Metro Manila) =

Proposed rapid transit line in Metro Manila, Philippines

Overview
- Other name: PNR East-West Rail
- Status: Proposed
- Owner: Philippine National Railways
- Locale: Manila, Quezon City
- Stations: 11

Service
- Operator: East West Rail Transit Corporation
- Rolling stock: 4-car EMUs
- Daily ridership: 600,000 (projected)

History
- Planned opening: TBA

Technical
- Line length: 9.4 km (5.8 mi)
- Track length: 18.8 km (11.7 mi)
- Num of tracks: Double-track
- Character: Elevated and underground
- Track gauge: 1,435 mm (4 ft 8 1/2 in)

The Metro Rail Transit Line 8, or MRT-8, also known as PNR East-West Line, is a proposed rapid transit line in the Philippines. It would be a 9-kilometer (5.6 mi) railway system connecting Sampaloc, Manila and Diliman, Quezon City via Commonwealth Avenue, Quezon Avenue, and España Boulevard.

The railway line was formerly designated as MRT-9, which has since been designated to the Metro Manila Subway.

== Background ==
The right-of-way of Line 8 can be traced to the original MRT Line 4 proposal in the late 20th century. In 1999, the former Line 4 was to be located between Recto Avenue in Manila and Batasan Hills in Quezon City. The proposed line was eventually renumbered as Line 8, with Line 4 redefined as the rapid transit alignment between Pasig and Taytay, Rizal after its approval in 2019.

An unsolicited proposal for the project was submitted to the Philippine government by Malaysia-based construction engineering company AlloyMTD group in 2016, and is awaiting approval by the National Economic Development Authority (NEDA). According to MTD Philippines, Inc. President Patrick Nicholas David, the project would cost ₱60 billion.

It was then announced in 2020 that the line will undergo detailed design phase starting 2021. Construction would then commence the following year and the line shall open by 2027.

A private company named Private Equity Investments and Development Corporation reported on its website on June 3, 2021 that the East West Rail Transit Corporation has sought French manufacturer Alstom to be one of its partners. They are expected to be involved in the project as an electromechanical supplier.

Another proposal, from the MRT-7, as part of its future expansion, will tread the same path with the exception of starting from West Avenue onwards towards Pier 4, instead of Quiapo. Like with the MRT-8, this proposed expansion from the MRT-7 are still pending approvals. However, MRT-7 has already began construction works along West Avenue for its turnback tracks, and the guideway is the possible starting point of its proposed expansion.

== Stations ==
Line 8 will have 12 stations, all located in Quezon City or Manila.

List of stations
Name	Distance (km)		Structure type	Connections	Location
Name	Between stations	Total	Structure type	Connections	Location
University Avenue	—	—	Depressed	Proposed interchange with Manila MRT Bus Routes: 6 7 17 34 49 TechnoHub	Quezon City
Quezon Memorial Circle	—	—	Depressed	Proposed interchange with Manila MRT Bus Routes: 6 7 17 34 49 Quezon City Hall; Quezon City Bus Service: 1 2 4 5 6 7 8 Quezon City Hall	Quezon City
Triangle Park	—	—	Depressed	Manila MRT: Quezon Avenue MMS Quezon Avenue; EDSA Carousel: 1 Quezon Avenue; Bus Routes: 6 7 17 34 49 Eton Centris	Quezon City
Timog	—	—	Elevated	Bus Routes: 6 7 17 34 49 Timog Avenue	Quezon City
FPJ Avenue	—	—	Elevated	Bus Routes: 6 7 17 34 49 Fisher Mall	Quezon City
Gregorio Araneta	—	—	Elevated	Bus Routes: 6 7 17 34 49 Gregorio Araneta Avenue	Quezon City
Banawe	—	—	Elevated	Bus Routes: 6 7 17 34 49 Banawe	Quezon City
Welcome Rotonda	—	—	Elevated	Bus Routes: 6 7 17 34 49 53 Quezon City Bus Service; 3 Welcome Rotonda	Quezon City
Maceda	—	—	Elevated	PNR: España; Bus Routes: 6 7 17 34 49 53 Blumentritt Road 5 14 38 40 52 54 San Diego Street	Manila
Lacson	—	—	Elevated	Bus Routes: 6 7 17 34 49 53 Lacson Avenue 5 14 38 40 52 54 Dimasalang Road	Manila
Lerma	—	—	Elevated	Manila LRT: Doroteo Jose Recto; Bus Routes: 6 7 17 34 49 53 Morayta 5 14 38 40 52 54 A.Mendoza Street	Manila
Hidalgo	—	—	Elevated	Bus Routes: 2 3 Hidalgo Street 13 19 20 21 Avenida 42 Doroteo Jose 5 6 7 14 17 34 38 40 49 52 53 54 Quiapo	Manila

== Rolling stock ==
According to a November 12, 2020 meeting with barangay captains of Manila, the line will use 4-car trainsets. Due to a 2016 National Economic and Development Authority (NEDA) directive, all conventional rail lines, including Line 8, will use standard-gauge track.
