= University of the Philippines Arboretum =

University garden in Quezon City, Philippines

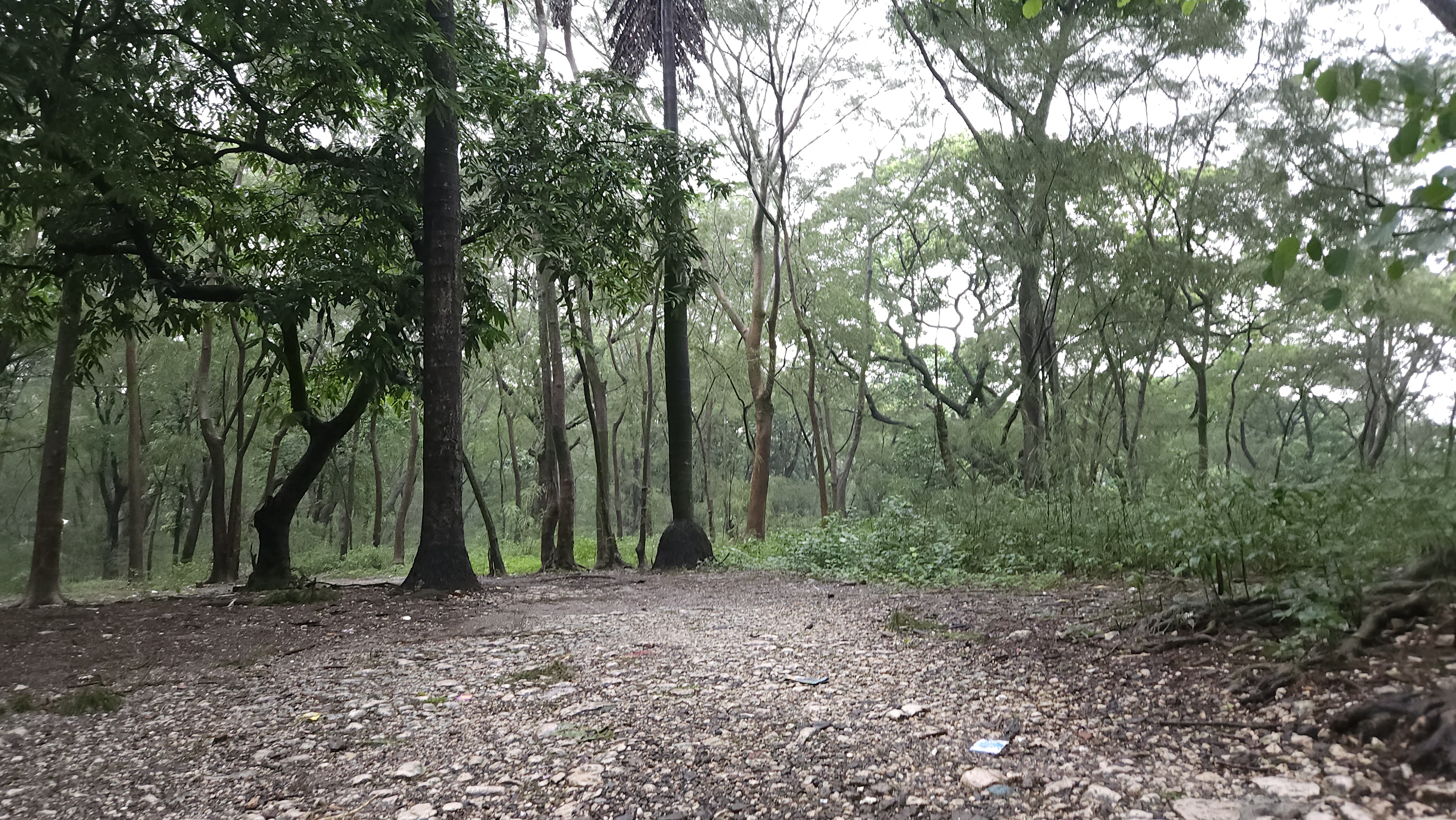
- Interactive map of University of the Philippines Arboretum
- Type: Arboretum
- Location: U.P. Campus, Quezon City
- Coordinates: 14°39′36″N 121°3′6″E
- Area: 16 ha (0.16 km^{2})
- Elevation: 70 m (230 ft)
- Owner: University of the Philippines Diliman
- Status: All year
- Public transit: Buses, jeepneys, tricycles, pedicabs

The University of the Philippines Arboretum, also known as UP Arboretum, is a botanical garden and urban forest located in the University of the Philippines Diliman campus in Quezon City, Metro Manila, Philippines. It lies at the northern part of Barangay U.P. Campus between the U.P.-Ayala Land TechnoHub on Commonwealth Avenue to the south and Central Avenue and Barangay Culiat to the north, close to the Philippine Nuclear Research Institute. The 16-hectare (40-acre) man-made forest garden houses a collection of more than 9,000 tropical plants of about 77 unique species. It is one of few rainforests of its size located entirely within Metro Manila.

== History ==
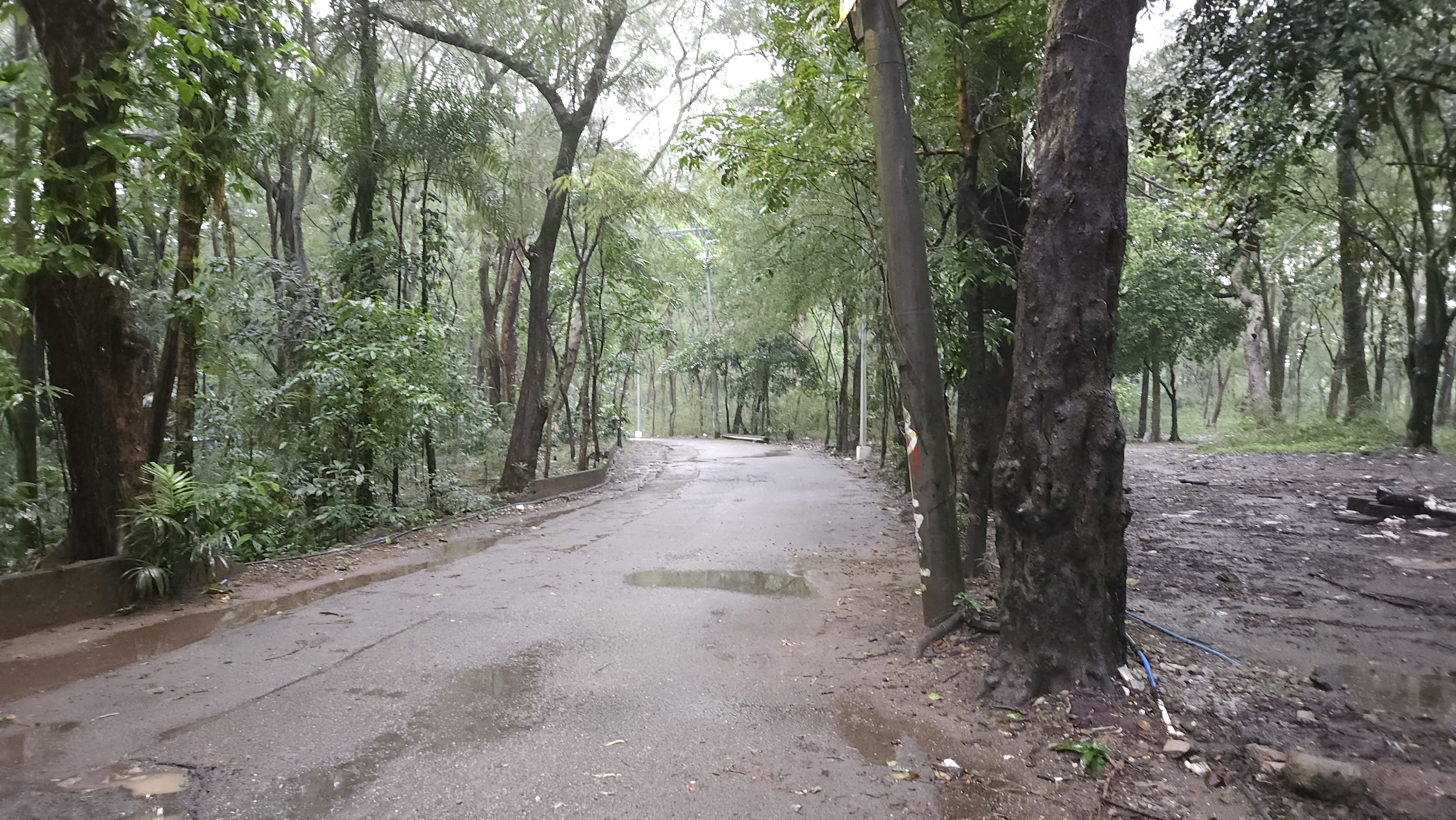
UP Arboretum Road

The arboretum was originally part of a large estate owned by the Jesuits during the Spanish colonial period. The Tuason family acquired the property in the 19th century including the open lands of the Santa Mesa and Mariquina estates. By 1938, the Philippine Commonwealth government purchased the land from the Tuasons after it has been selected as the site of the new capital. Of the total 1,529 hectares (3,780 acres) purchased by the government, 493 hectares (1,220 acres) was set aside for the campus extension of the University of the Philippines in Manila. The site of the arboretum was initially converted to a forest nursery by the Department of Agriculture and Natural Resources. During World War II, this "wooded area" housed the "American employees' quarters" of the United States Army. When the Philippines gained independence in 1948, the nursery was turned over to the university by the U.S. government and the arboretum was established. The administration of the arboretum was officially transferred to the University of the Philippines Diliman from the Reforestation Administration of the Department of Agriculture in 1962.

== Description ==
The UP Arboretum is located on a plateau with an elevation of 70 metres (230 ft) above sea level. It lies in the middle of a natural ridge that runs northwest-southeast and is crossed by small creeks. The arboretum contains a collection of tropical plant species, many of which are endemic and endangered. The most common trees found in the arboretum are kupang, mahogany, narra, and rain trees. Many of these trees tower as high as 20 feet or more. It is also inhabited by alibangbáng, palo santo, monkey pod and tagutagu. They provide a sanctuary to 47 bird species, such as the long-tailed shrike, olive-backed sunbird, Philippine pygmy woodpecker, brown shrike, yellow-vented bulbul, lowland white-eye, pied triller, Eurasian tree sparrow, mountain shrike, Pacific swallow, pied fantail, tailorbird, lemon-throated leaf warbler and the spotted dove.

The arboretum is also a habitat to 15 species of reptiles and amphibians, which include Tokay gecko, house gecko, Stejneger's hemidactylid gecko, Mabuya mutifascia, cane toad, common green frog, giant Visayan frog, Chinese edible frog, common tree frog and common puddle frog. In addition, the arboretum is home to several small mammals, such as the lesser short-nosed fruit bat, greater musky fruit bat, Geoffroy's rousette, cave nectar bat, Asian house shrew, brown rat and Polynesian rat.

== Gallery ==
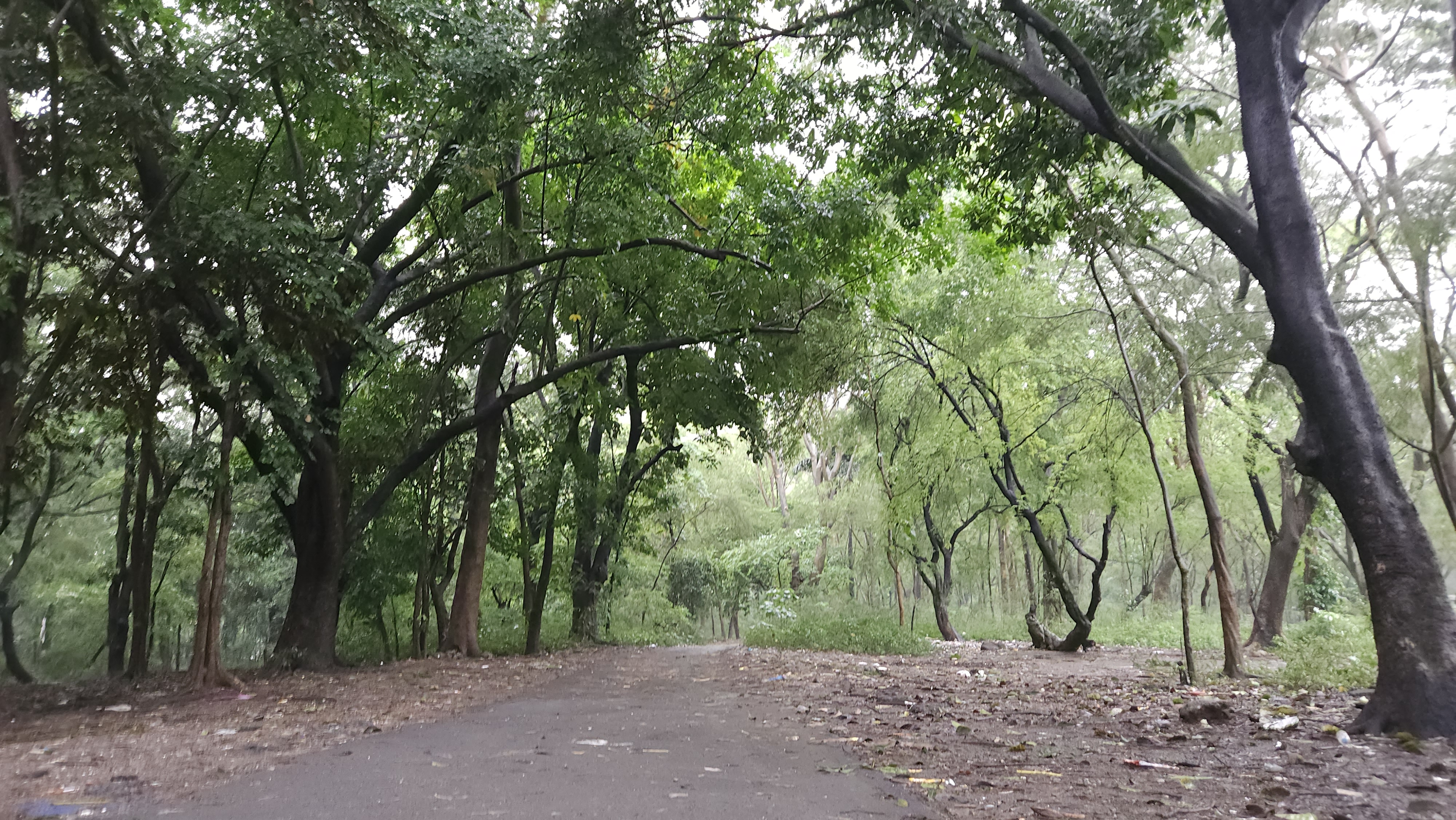
A concrete road inside the arboretum lined with forest cover.

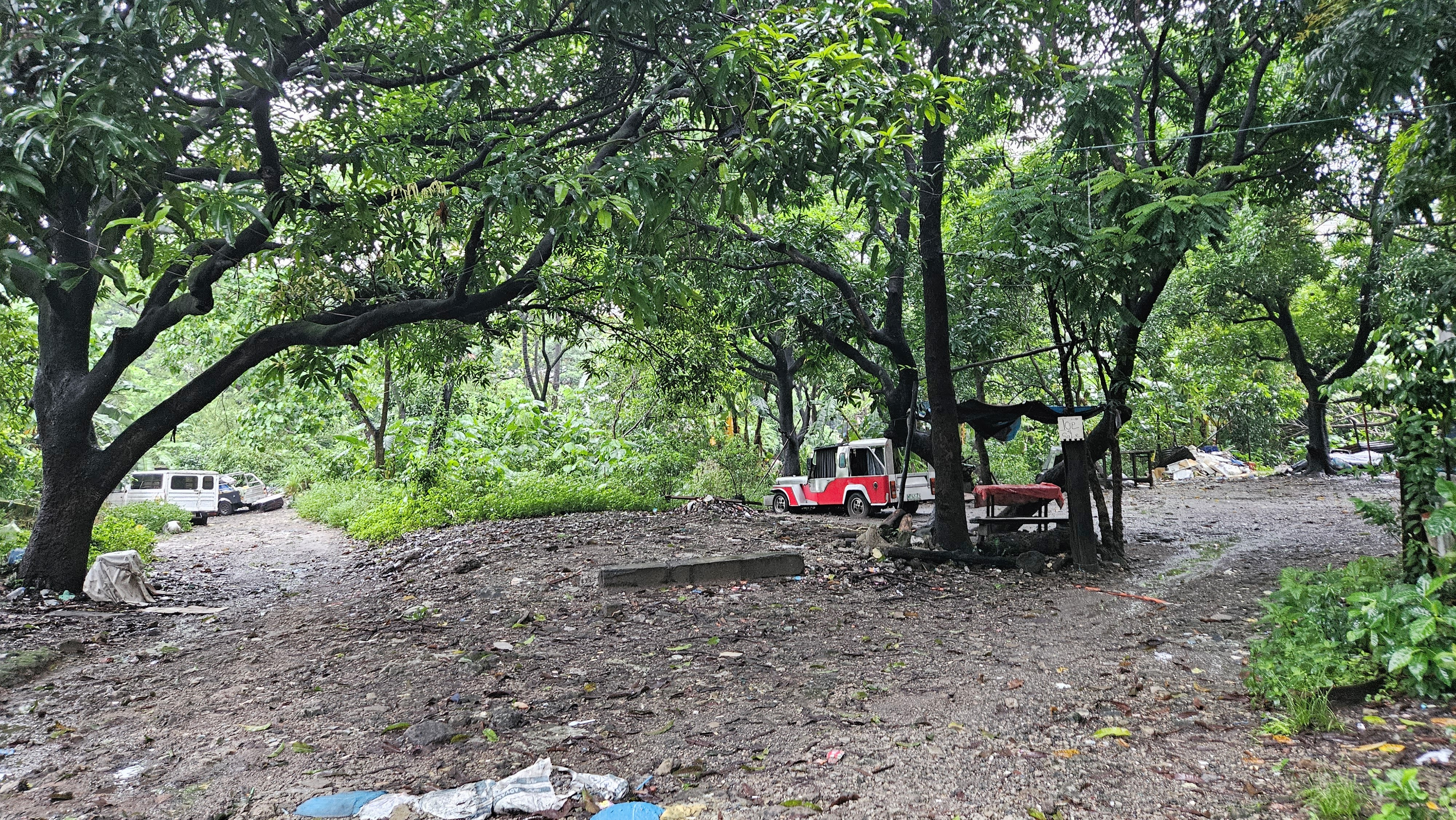
Intersecting dirt roads inside the arboretum.

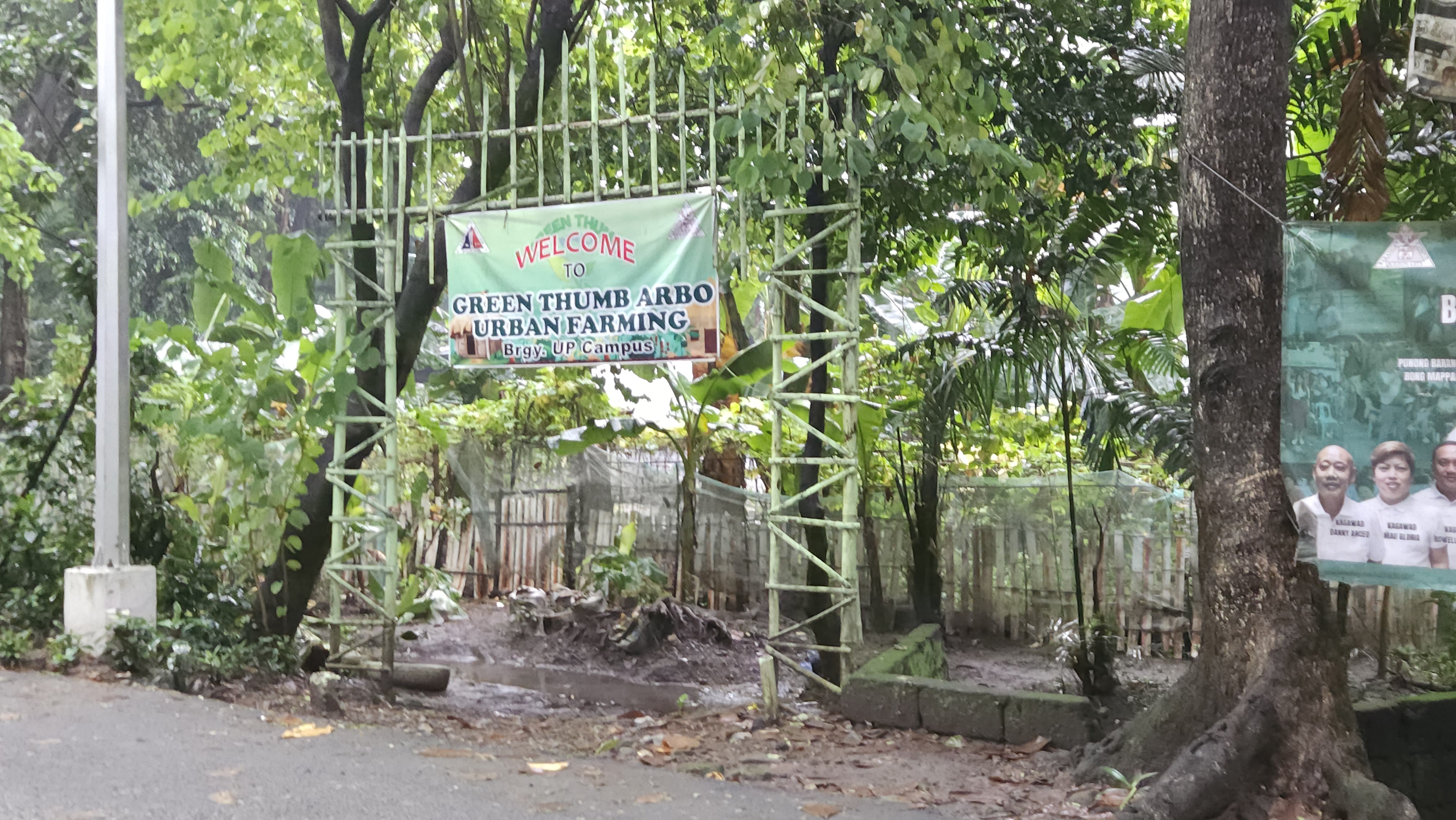
Green Thumb Arbo Urban Farming (ArboQC), an urban farm located inside the arboretum.

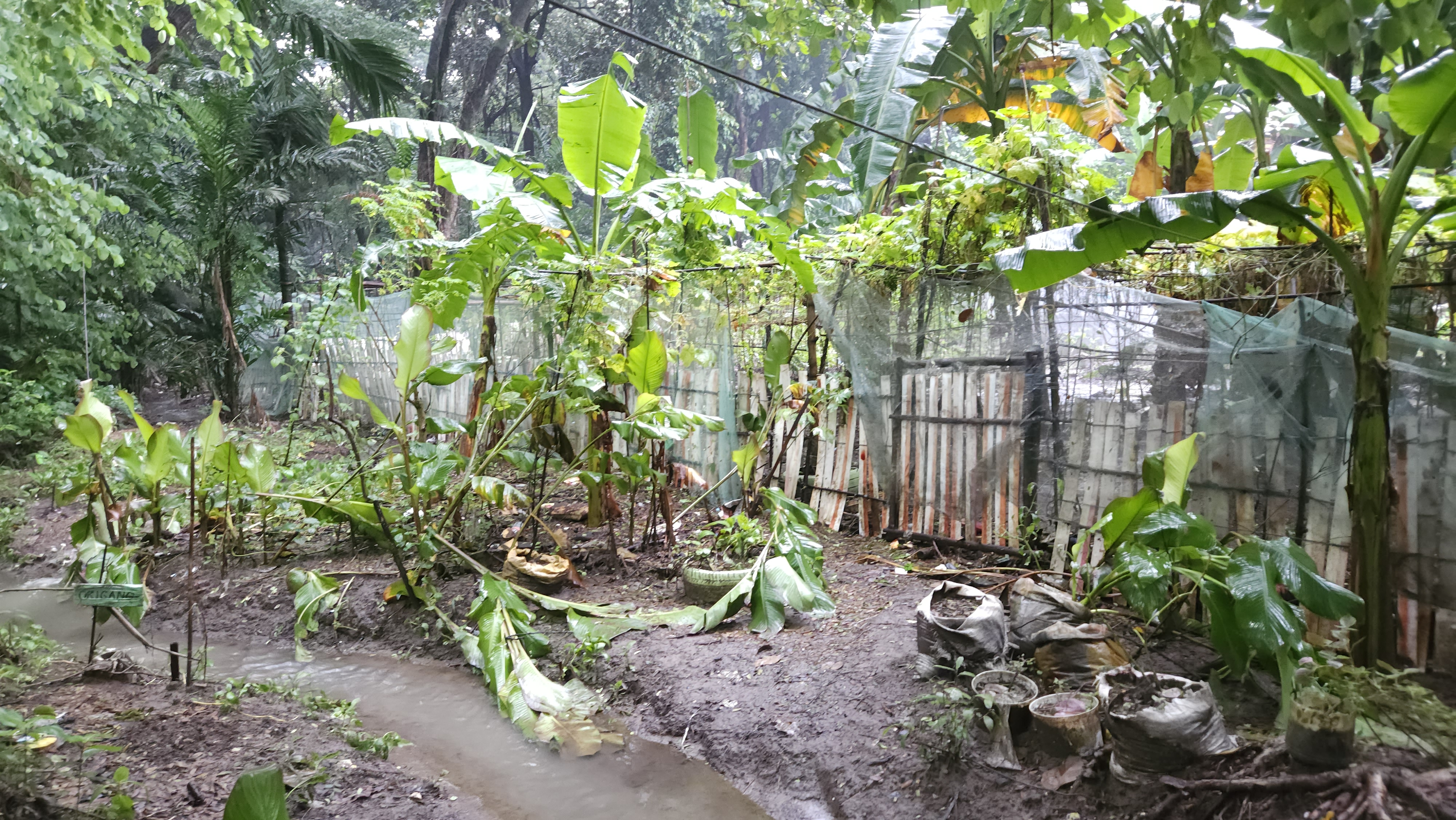
Perimeter fence of the ArboQC urban farm.

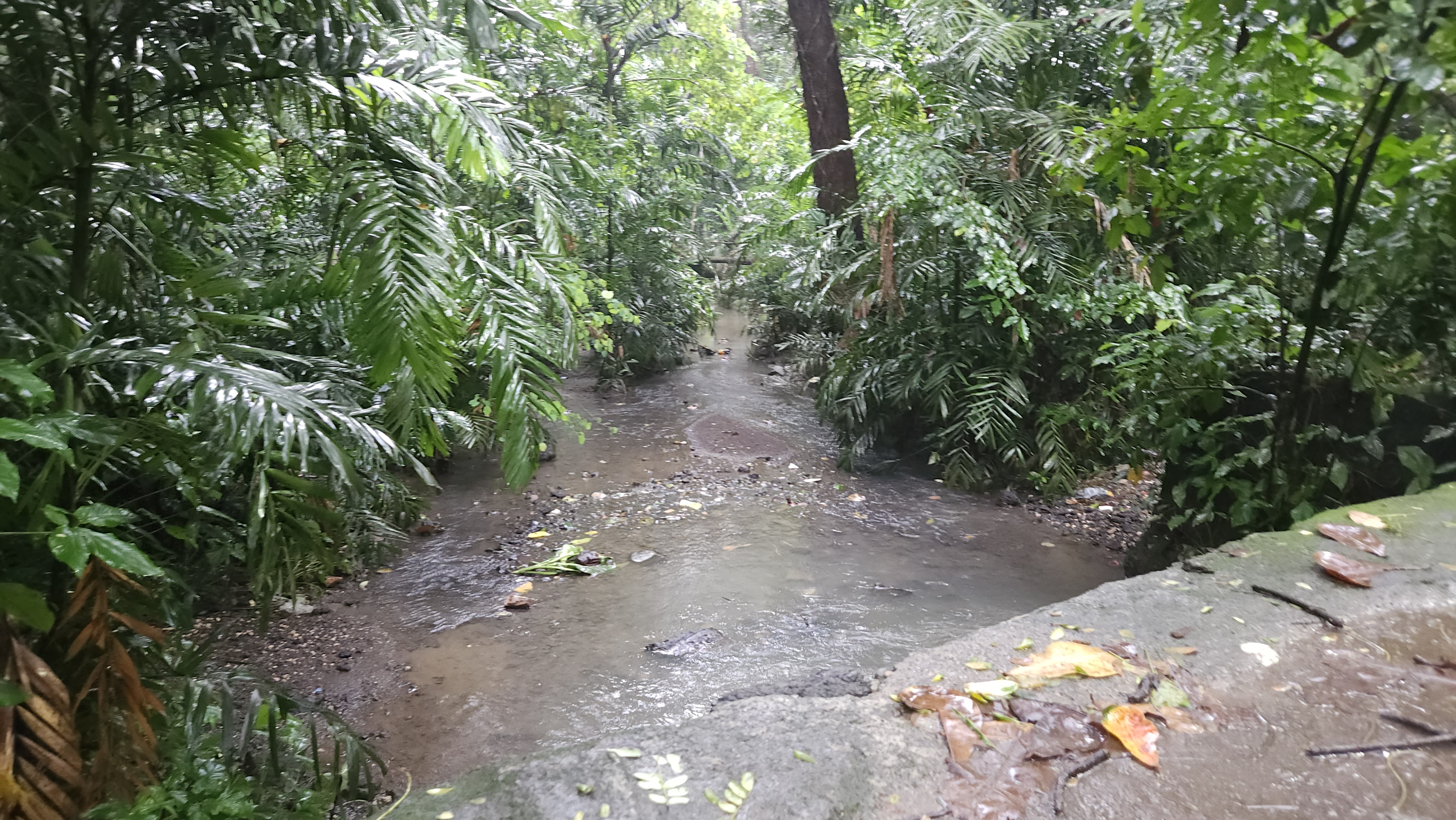
A creek running along Arboretum Road.
