= Tomas Morato =

Spanish-born Filipino businessman and politician

The Honorable Tomás Eduardo Morató
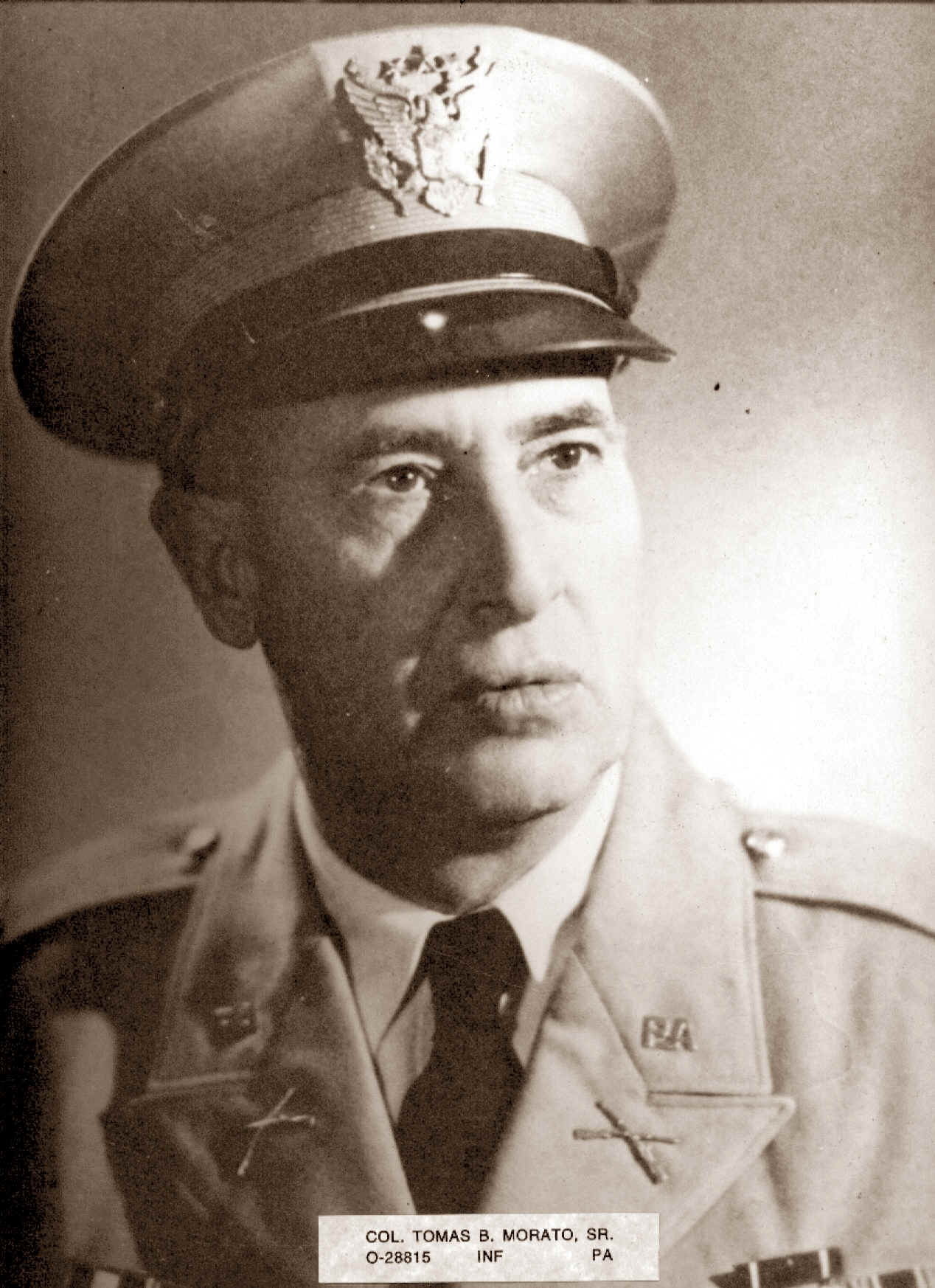
- Morató as an Army Officer during World War II

1st Mayor of Quezon City
- In office November 9, 1939 (Note: Appointed ad interim mayor of Quezon City effective October 23, 1939, but his appointment paper as signed by President Manuel L. Quezon on November 10, 1939 showed the effective date from October 12, 1939.) – July 19, 1942
- Appointed by: Manuel L. Quezon
- Vice Mayor: Vicente Fragante (1939); Ponciano Bernardo (1939–1941)
- Preceded by: Manuel L. Quezon (acting)
- Succeeded by: Vacant (next held by Ponciano Bernardo)

Member of the Philippine House of Representatives from Tayabas's 2nd district
- In office May 25, 1946 – December 30, 1949
- Preceded by: Francisco Lavides
- Succeeded by: Gaudencio Vera

Member of the National Assembly from Tayabas
- In office September 25, 1943 – February 2, 1944 Serving with Natalio Enriquez

45th Mayor of Calauag
- In office 1934–1938
- Preceded by: Jacinto Lerum
- Succeeded by: José Jiménez

Personal details
- Born: Tomás Eduardo Morató Bernabéu; July 4, 1887 Xàbia, Alicante, Spain
- Died: March 6, 1965 (aged 77) Quezon City, Philippines
- Resting place: Manila North Cemetery, Philippines
- Citizenship: Philippines
- Party: Liberal (1946–1965); KALIBAPI (1943–1945); Nacionalista (1934-1943)
- Spouse(s): Cecilia Racoma Pica; Consuelo Eclavea Lim
- Domestic partner: Marcela Spanya
- Children: 10 including Manuel
- Occupation: Businessman, politician
- Profession: Engineer

Military service
- Allegiance: Philippines; United States
- Branch/service: Philippine Commonwealth Army
- Years of service: 1942–1946
- Rank: Colonel
- Commands: Armed Forces of the Philippines
- Battles/wars: World War II * Japanese Occupation (1942-1944) * Allied Liberation (1944-1945)

Tomás Eduardo Morató Bernabéu (Spanish: [toˈmas eˈðwaɾðo moɾaˈto βeɾnaˈβew]; July 4, 1887 – March 6, 1965) was a Spanish-born Filipino businessman and politician of Valencian ethnicity and full-blooded Spanish descent who became Mayor of Calauag, Quezon, before he became the first Mayor of Quezon City from 1939 to 1942.

== Early life and career ==
Morató was born on July 4, 1887, in the picturesque seaport of Alicante on the Mediterranean coast of Spain to Francisco Morató and Josefa Bernabéu Ferrer. His father was a ship captain who sailed from Spain to the Philippines and frequently stopped at the coastal town of Calauag, Tayabas. An only son, Tomás was brought to Calauag in 1898 by his father. There the 13-year-old boy first met and studied with the 22-year-old Quezon. Tomás finished his engineering course and entered the lumber business where he amassed quite a fortune.

== Friendship with Quezon ==
It was in Baler where he met Manuel L. Quezon, the 2nd President of the Philippines, and became friends with him. His friendship with Quezon was a rare and unique one. They courted girls together and helped each other during difficult times. When Quezon was elected president in 1935, he entered Malacañan for the first time with Morató and Manuel L. "Nonong" Quezon, Jr. And thereafter, Morató was one of the very few people who could enter Malacañan at all times, even staying overnight in some often cases.

Quezon himself urged Morató to enter politics, so he ran as Mayor of Calauag and won with ease. At his second term, Quezon invited him to help build a new city, a city that would later be known as Quezon City.

== Mayor of Quezon City (1939–1942) ==
Morató was a leader full of energy, taking difficult tasks that hinders growth and progress of the new city. Even though his administration faced low funds, it was able to create a network of new roads, and maintenance of satisfactory health conditions. With a police force of 48, crime rates remained at controlled levels. He also promoted social and economic programs to alleviate the condition of the residents.

The first musical piece composed for Quezon City was the “Quezon City March”, which was composed by Amando Calleja and the lyrics made by Jesús Balmori. The sponsors of this musical piece were the officials and members of the Cubao Women's Club headed by Morató's wife.

He was arrested by the Imperial Japanese troops when Quezon City had been taken over by the Japanese. This ended his term as the mayor of the city and was paroled and exiled on July 19, 1942, during World War II.

== Death ==
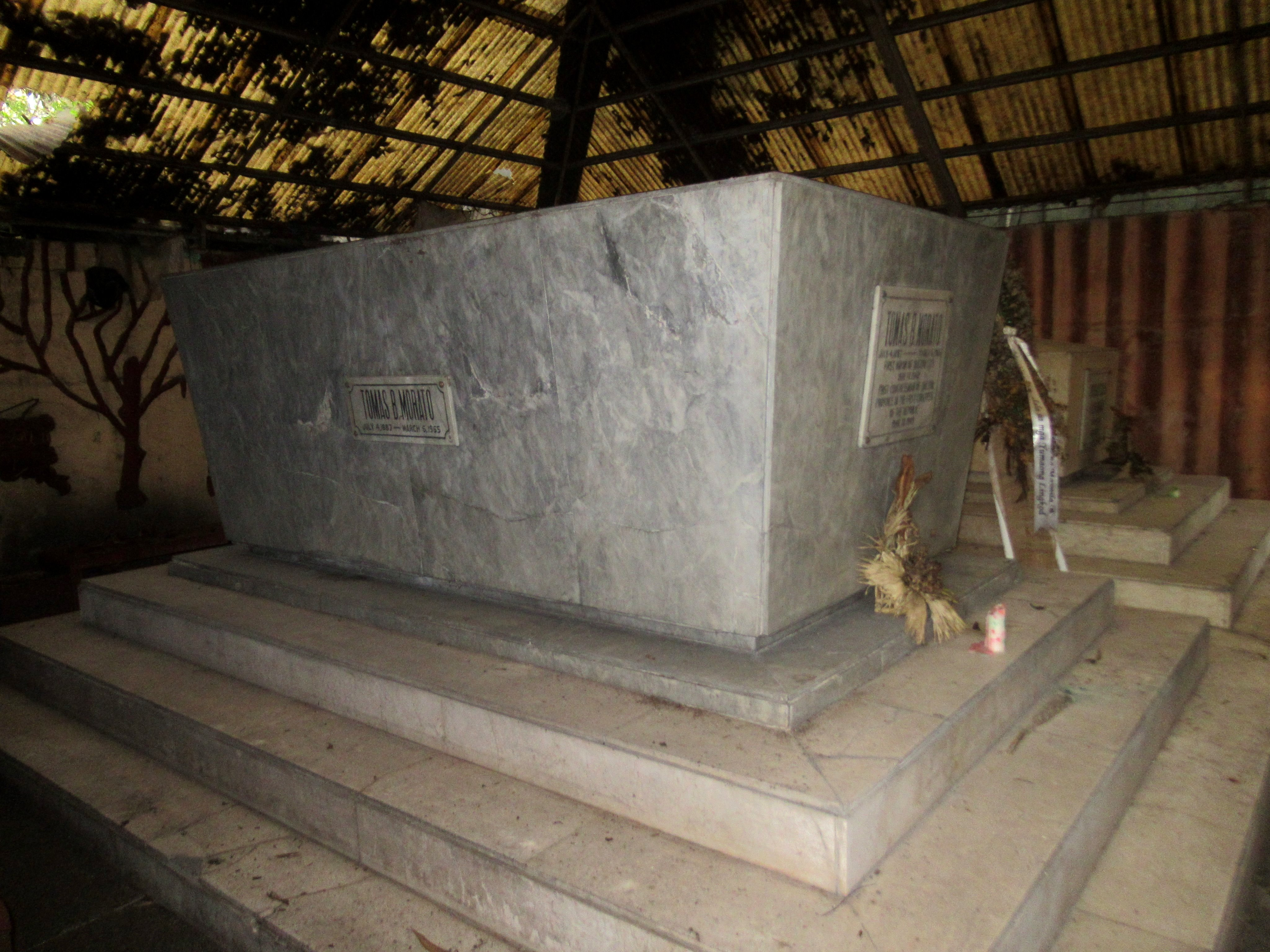
Morato's grave at the Manila North Cemetery

Morato died on March 6, 1965. His remains were interred at the Manila North Cemetery.

== Legacy ==
The popular restaurant row Tomas Morato Avenue and the road of the same name in San Francisco del Monte, Quezon City are named after him. Barangay Don Tomas in Santa Elena, Camarines Norte and a street in Calauag, Quezon were also named in memory of the last municipal President and first municipal Mayor of Calauag, Quezon.

== Notes ==
Political offices
Preceded by Jacinto Lerum	45th Municipal President and Mayor of Calauag, Tayabas; 1934–1938	Succeeded by José Jiménez
Preceded by Manuel L. Quezon (Acting)	Mayor of Quezon City; 1939–1942	Vacant City dissolved Title next held by Ponciano Bernardo
House of Representatives of the Philippines
Preceded by Francisco Lavides	Member of the House of Representatives from Tayabas's 2nd district 1946–1949	Succeeded by Gaudencio V. Vera
