= U.P.–Ayala Land TechnoHub =

Information technology hub in Quezon City, Philippines

- Aerial view of the TechnoHub. December 2025
- Interactive map of U.P.–Ayala Land TechnoHub
- Location: U.P. Campus, Quezon City, Metro Manila, Philippines
- Coordinates: 14.657229°N 121.055834°E
- Opening date: November 22, 2008
- Developer: Ayala Land
- Owner: University of the Philippines Diliman
- Size: 20 hectares (0.20 km^{2})
- Public transit: Jeepneys, UV Express, and tricycles 6 7 17 34 49 U.P. Technohub; Future: University Avenue
- Website: ayalalandoffices.com.ph

The U.P.–Ayala Land TechnoHub is an information technology hub jointly developed by the University of the Philippines Diliman and property developer Ayala Land. It is located along Commonwealth Avenue in U.P. Campus, Quezon City, Metro Manila. and occupies 20 ha (0.20 km^{2}) of the 37.5 ha (0.375 km^{2}) U.P. North Science and Technology Park inside the U.P. Diliman campus.

The development is bounded to the north by Central Avenue and the Philippine Nuclear Research Institute, bounded to the east by the U.P. Arboretum, and bounded to the southeast by Commonwealth Avenue.

== History ==
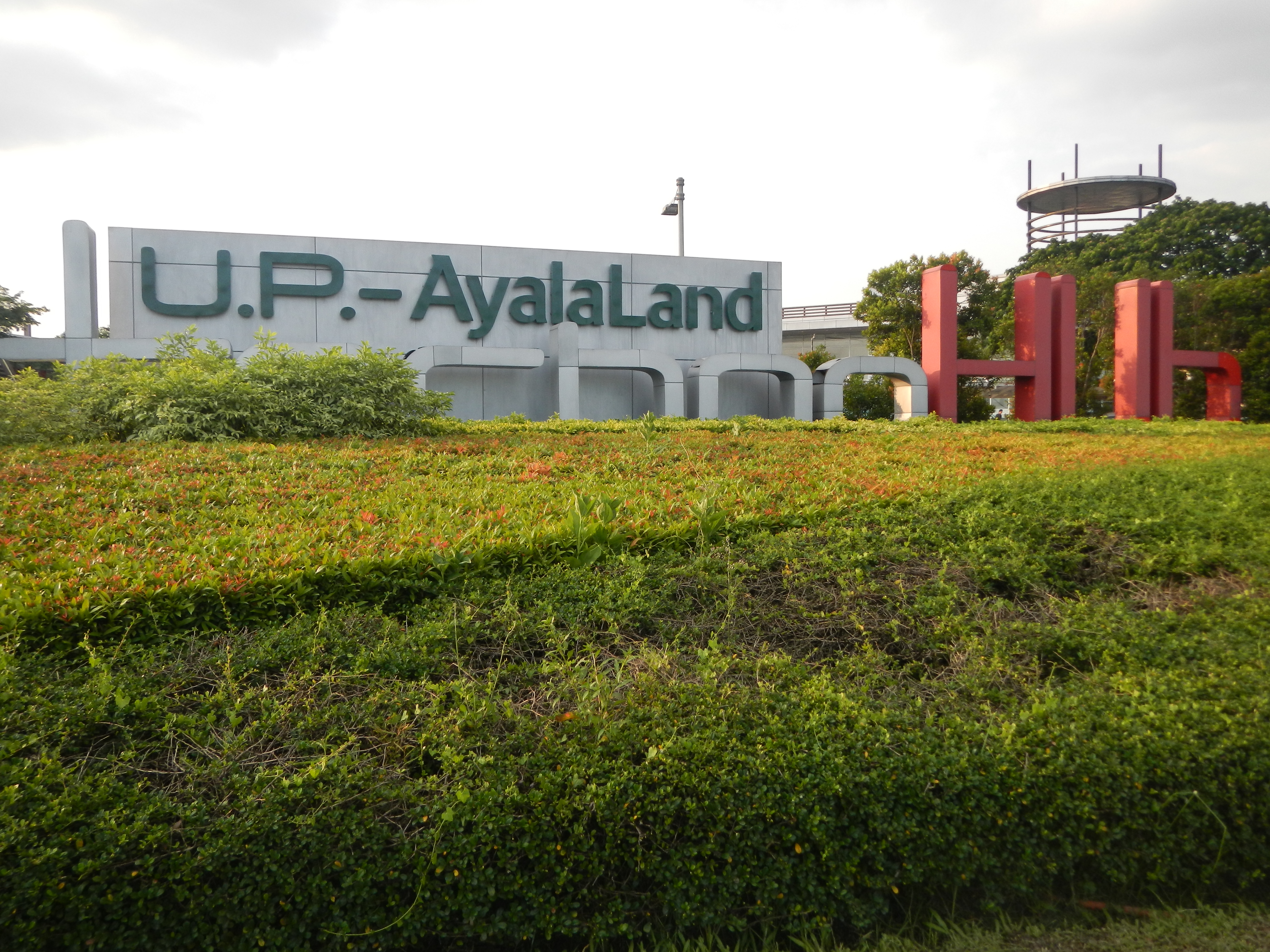
Signage

The land where the TechnoHub now stands is owned by the University of the Philippines Diliman. Sometime in October 2006, the land was leased to Ayala Land by the state university so an information technology hub could be developed. In that month, Ayala Land announced that it would invest P6 billion over the following five to ten years to develop the Commonwealth Avenue property. Then-Quezon City mayor Feliciano Belmonte, Jr. signed an order in December 2006 adjusting the zoning classification of part of UP Diliman so that the project could legally proceed.

The TechnoHub is the second U.P.-Ayala joint project, the first being the U.P. South Technopark along C.P. Garcia and Katipunan Avenues; it is then followed by collaborations on Katipunan Avenue south of the UP Diliman campus. Critics have charged that the site represents stealth privatization of part of the university and a gateway for private sector "vultures" to establish a foothold in the non-commercial university. Seven U.P. students were arrested for raising protests to this end during the hub's inauguration on November 22, 2008 they were released without charges.

The first batch of tenants began moving into the technology park in August 2008. In October 2008, Ayala announced that ten startups would move into the northern technology park, in comparison to the nine already located in its southern counterpart.

In July 2009, Ayala and UP Diliman's opened a third collaboration, the DOST-PEZA Open Technology Business Incubator, at Katipunan Avenue; the new incubator planned to host companies focused on cloud computing and open-source software development.

In 2014, the Quezon City local government planned to auction off the TechnoHub property due to the University of the Philippines alleged failure to pay it P117 million worth of real estate tax. While under the law, educational institutions are exempt from paying real estate tax, the Quezon City Treasury interprets that the property became taxable the moment the university leased it to a private firm. The auction was called off by the Supreme Court through a temporary restraining order.

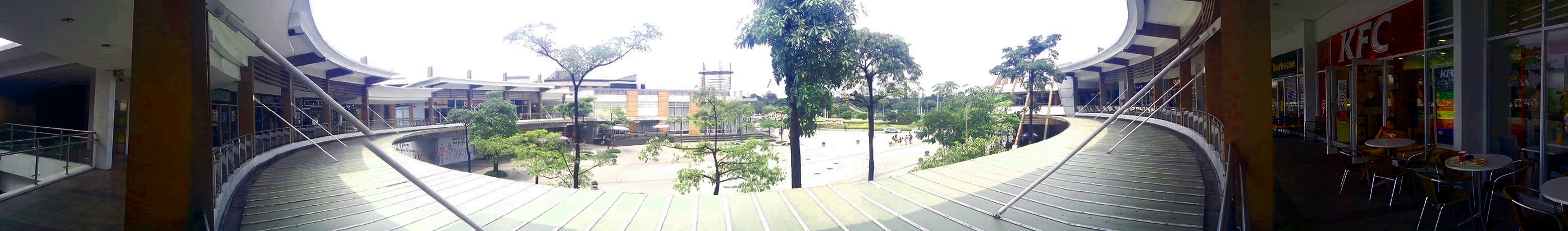
Panorama of the U.P. Ayala Land TechnoHub from the second floor of the Tech Portal Building

== Business activities ==
The entire development was listed as an approved IT Park by the Philippine Economic Zone Authority in February 2009. This status makes export-oriented companies located therein eligible for temporary tax holiday, permanent reduced rate of corporate income tax, and other incentives. IBM announced in February 2009 that it would open an Innovation Center at the park, its second in Southeast Asia after the one located in Malaysia. Convergys also inaugurated its contact center at TechnoHub in April 2009, along with two others simultaneously opened at Nuvali TechnoHub in Santa Rosa, Laguna and Cebu IT Park in Cebu City.
