= 1989 University of the Philippines–Department of National Defense accord =

Security and rights agreement

1989 UP–DND accord
1989 agreement of UP and DND on military and police operations in the UP system
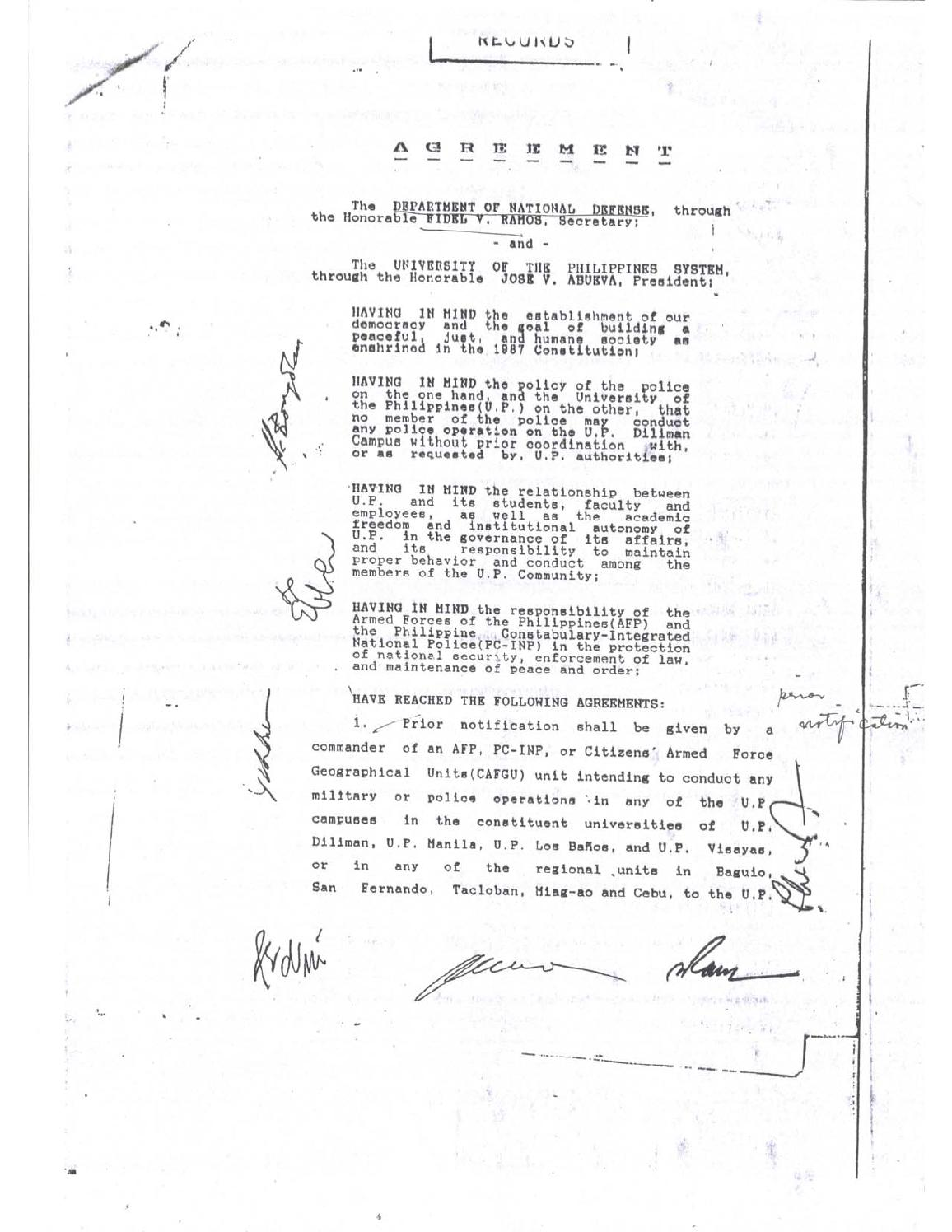
- First page of the document
- Signed: June 30, 1989
- Location: Diliman, Quezon City
- Effective: June 30, 1989
- Condition: Agreement took effect immediately
- Expiration: January 15, 2021 (de facto)
- Negotiators: University of the Philippines
- Parties: Department of National Defense; University of the Philippines
- Depositary: Government of the Philippines
- Languages: English

Full text
- 1989 University of the Philippines–Department of National Defense accord at Wikisource

The 1989 University of the Philippines–Department of National Defense accord (UP–DND accord) was a bilateral agreement between the Department of National Defense (DND) and the University of the Philippines (UP) that restricted military and police access and operations inside the university.

== Background ==
On June 16, 1989, Donato Continente, a staffer of The Philippine Collegian, was arrested within the premises of the university for his involvement in the killing of US Army Col. James Nicholas Rowe on April 21, 1989. Media reports at the time had labeled Continente as the actual murderer rather than an accomplice in the murder, and tagged him as an alleged communist rebel. The Supreme Court of the Philippines later shortened Continente's jail sentence, releasing him on June 28, 2005, after being incarcerated for over 14 years. Continente pled not guilty of the crime and claimed that he was tortured and abducted by ununiformed authorities to admit that he took part in it.

Because of the incident, an agreement between then-UP student leader Sonia Soto and then-defense minister Juan Ponce Enrile, known as the Soto–Enrile accord, was signed on October 28, 1981 to protect students from the presence of the military and police in any of UP's campuses.

== Negotiation ==
14 days after Continente's arrest, on June 30, 1989, UP President Jose V. Abueva and Defense Secretary Fidel V. Ramos signed the agreement, which effectively succeeded the 1981 Soto–Enrile accord. The agreement was made to ensure the academic freedom of UP's students and prevent state officials from interfering with students' protests.

== Provisions ==
The provisions of the agreement were the following:

- State officials that are intending to conduct an operation inside a UP campus shall give a prior notification to the UP administration except in the events of a pursuit, or any other emergency situations.
- UP officials shall provide assistance to law enforcers within UP premises and endeavor to strengthen its own security, police, and fire-fighting capabilities without being exploited unlawfully.
- Only uniformed authorities may enter the university if a request for assistance by the UP administration is granted.
- State officials shall not interfere with any peaceful protest being conducted by the UP's constituents within the premises of the university. UP officials shall be deemed responsible for the actions and behavior of their constituents.
- Search and arrest warrants for students, faculty members, and employees shall be given after a prior notification was sent to the UP administration.
- No warrant shall be served after twenty-four hours of its service and without the presence of at least two UP officials.
- The arrest and detention of any UP student, faculty, and employee in the Philippines shall be reported immediately by the authorities in-charge to the UP administration.

== Termination ==
On January 18, 2021, Defense Secretary Delfin Lorenzana and his office announced to the public the unilateral termination of the agreement citing that the Communist Party of the Philippines (CPP) and its armed wing, New People's Army (NPA), both tagged as terrorist organizations by the Anti-Terrorism Council, have been recruiting members inside the university and called it a "hindrance in providing effective security, safety, and welfare of the students, faculty, and employees of UP." The DND notified the termination of the agreement to UP three days earlier. The Armed Forces of the Philippines chairman of the joint chiefs Gilbert Gapay claimed that at least 18 students of the university recruited by the NPA have been killed so far in clashes with the military according to their records.

A similar agreement between the Polytechnic University of the Philippines (PUP) and the DND that was signed in 1990 is also being advocated for termination by Duterte Youth Representative Ducielle Cardema.

=== Reactions and responses ===
President Rodrigo Duterte supported the DND's decision to abrogate the agreement according to a statement by Presidential Spokesperson Harry Roque. In an interview with CNN Philippines, Roque, a former UP law professor and human rights lawyer, replied to a tweet from UP professor Danilo Arao that questions his honor and excellence, by saying that he already asked the defense secretary and the UP president to settle down. When asked about his personal opinion about the decision, he said, "there's really no such thing when you are a presidential spokesperson."

Vice President Leni Robredo, on the other hand, denounced the decision and said that the decision was meant to silence the critics of the administration. On January 20, Senators Joel Villanueva, Sonny Angara, Nancy Binay, and Grace Poe filed a bill in the Senate to institutionalize the accord into Republic Act No. 9005, or the University of the Philippines Charter of 2008. Several lawmakers from both branches of Congress have also expressed their concerns and disagreements with the DND's decision.

UP President Danilo Concepcion said that the termination of the agreement was "totally unnecessary and unwarranted" and was made without consulting the UP administration. UP Student Regent Renee Co, meanwhile, called the decision "one of the [government's] worst attempts at destroying the institutional safeguards that UP students have fought to put in their struggle for their democratic rights."

On January 19, the UP held a rally to condemn the termination of the agreement. The hashtag #DefendUP trended on Twitter with some discussion focusing on the Duterte administration, stating that "this is another way of the administration to threaten and silence activists who have opposed President Duterte's several policies, especially on supposed red-tagging activities and on the COVID-19 pandemic response."

== See also ==
- University of the Philippines Diliman Police
