= University Avenue station =

MRT Line 7 stop in Quezon City, Philippines

ML03	University Avenue
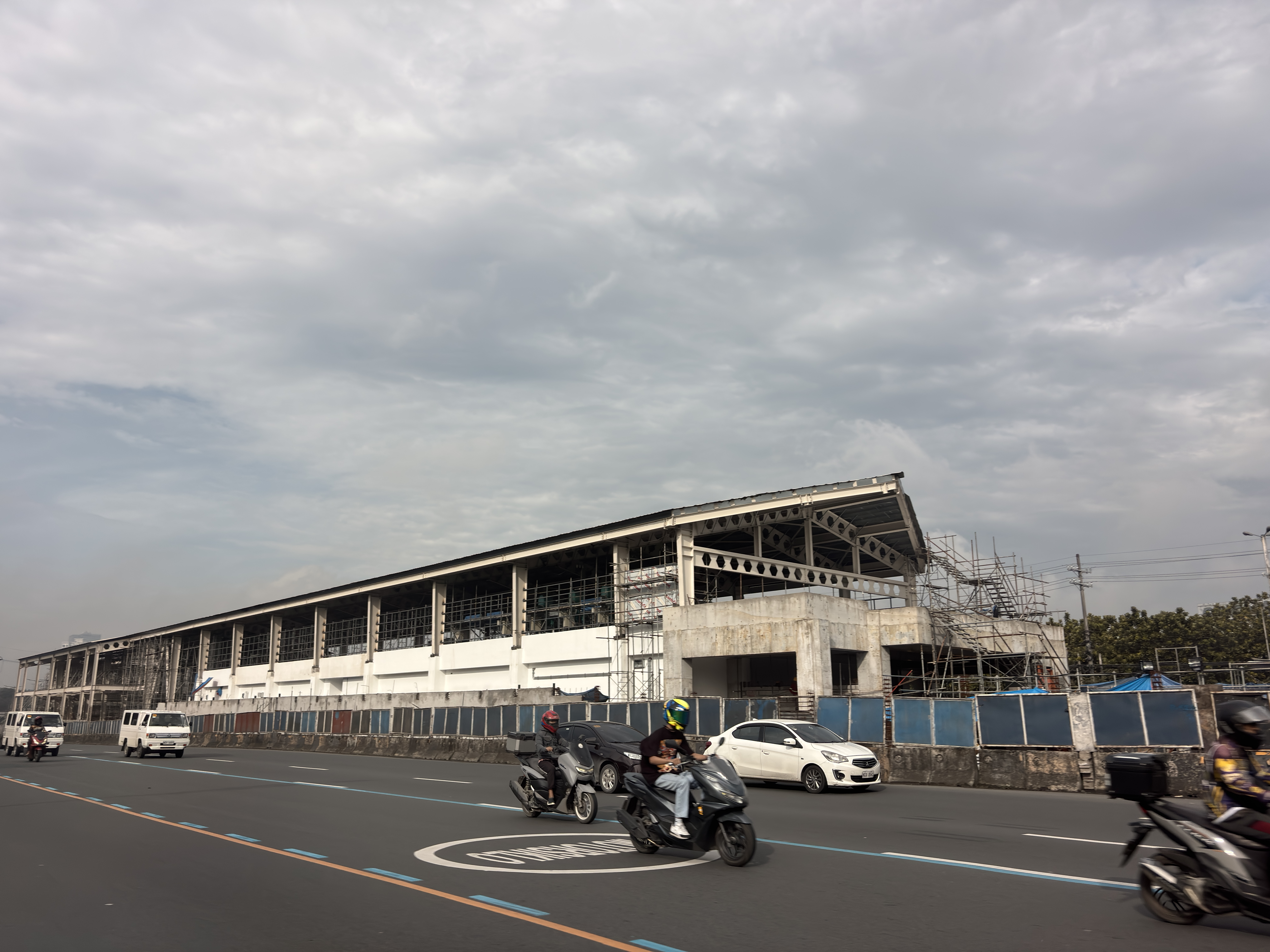
- Construction progress as of October 2025

General information
- Location: Commonwealth Avenue; U.P. Campus, Quezon City; Philippines
- Coordinates: 14°39′18″N 121°03′18″E
- Owner: Line 7: SMC-Mass Rail Transit 7 Incorporated; Line 8: TBA
- Lines: MRT Line 7 MRT Line 8
- Platforms: 2 side
- Tracks: 2 (4 in the future)
- Connections: 6 7 49 TechnoHub

Construction
- Structure type: Underground
- Accessible: Yes

Other information
- Status: Under construction

History
- Opening: Line 7: 2027; Line 8: TBA

Services
Preceding station	Manila MRT	Following station
Quezon Memorial Circle towards North EDSA	MRT Line 7	Tandang Sora towards San Jose Del Monte
Terminus	MRT Line 8	Quezon Memorial towards Lerma
Location

University Avenue station is an under-construction Metro Rail Transit (MRT) station located on the MRT Line 7 (MRT-7) system along Commonwealth Avenue in U.P. Campus, Quezon City. It will also serve as the eastern terminus of the proposed MRT Line 8 (MRT-8) system. The station itself is located within the campus of the University of the Philippines Diliman and is named after University Avenue, the main road leading towards the university. The MRT-7 system has a proposed spur line to connect itself to the LRT Line 2 (LRT-2) system at Katipunan station, passing through the University of the Philippines Diliman and Katipunan Avenue, while the MRT-8 system will terminate at this station with a spur line towards its depot further inside UP Diliman. Construction started on August 15, 2017 and was expected to end around April 2018.

When completed, the station will serve the following establishments: University of the Philippines Diliman, U.P.–Ayala Land TechnoHub, Philippine Coconut Authority (PhilCoa), and the Commission on Human Rights Complex.

The station, unlike the separate Quezon Memorial Circle stations of MRT-7 and MRT-8, will be situated at the same complex with the MRT-8 building platforms side-by-side the MRT-7 platforms thereby creating a common station.

== Station details ==
University Avenue station is one of two underground stations on the MRT-7. It is located underneath Commonwealth Avenue and near University Avenue, the main road leading to the University of the Philippines Diliman campus. Apart from the university, the station will serve various landmarks including the Philippine Coconut Authority (Philcoa), Commission on Human Rights, and the U.P.–Ayala Land TechnoHub business park. The station will also be connected to various local bus routes via the TechnoHub bus stop.
