= Quezon City Public Library =

Public library in Quezon City, Philippines

Quezon City Public Library Aklatan ng Lungsod Quezon

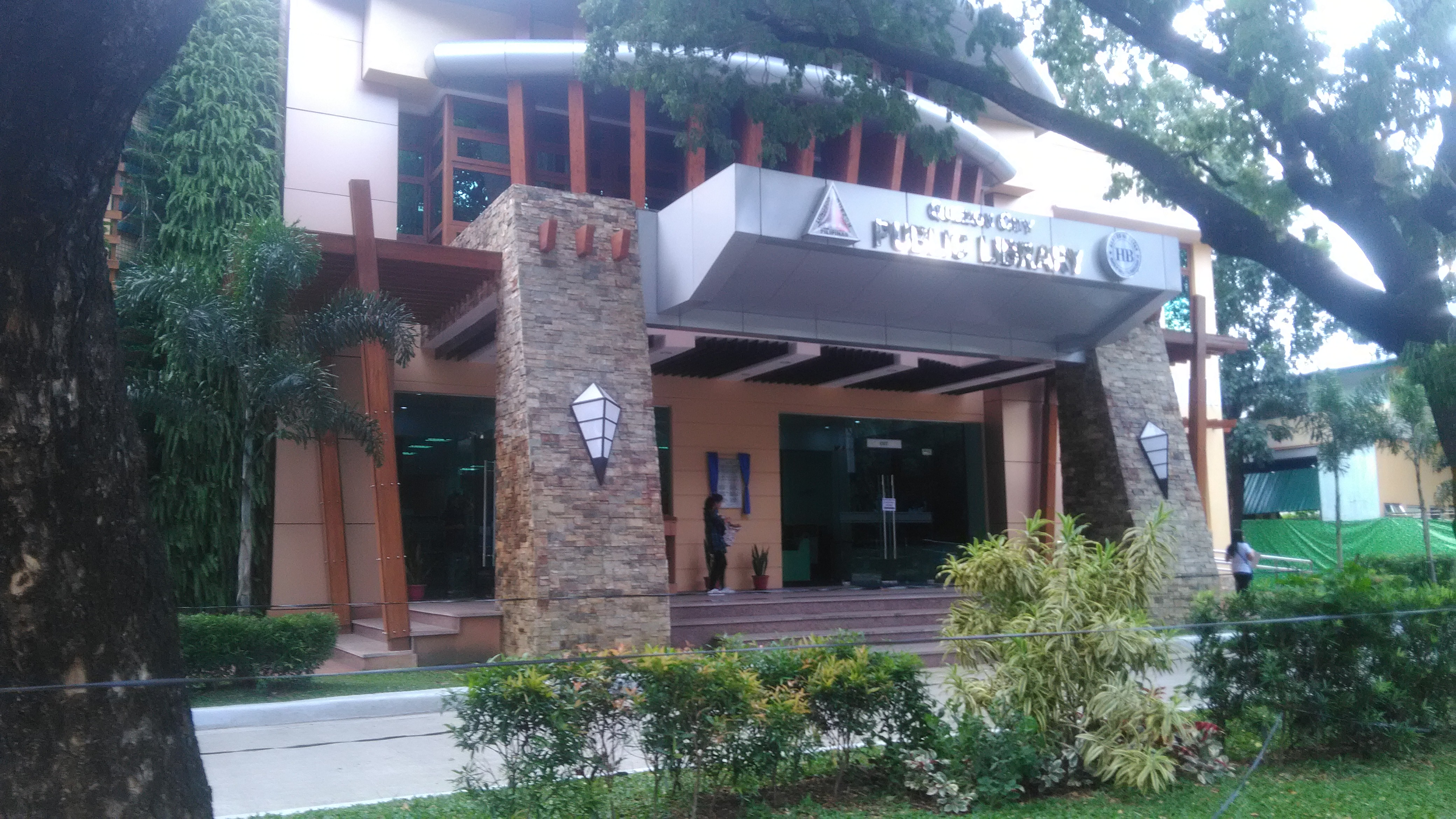
- 14°38′52″N 121°03′02″E
- Location: Quezon City Hall Complex, Quezon City, Metro Manila, Philippines
- Established: August 16, 1948
- Branches: 20 (Bagong Pag-asa, Balingasa, Project 7, Project 8, Batasan Hills, Lagro, Novaliches, Talipapa, Pasong Tamo, Payatas, Bagumbayan Branch, Greater Project 4, Pansol, Escopa 2, Escopa 3, Cubao, Galas, Horseshoe, Krus na Ligas, Roxas)

Collection
- Items collected: Books, journals, newspapers, magazines, and media.
- Size: 18,131+ books (main), 71+ computers (main)

Access and use
- Access requirements: Open to the general public, including people who are not residents of Quezon City.

Other information
- Website: qcpl.quezoncity.gov.ph

The Quezon City Public Library (QCPL, Filipino: Aklatan ng Lungsod Quezon) is a public library of Quezon City, Metro Manila, Philippines. The main library is situated within the Quezon City Hall complex while the library also maintain smaller branches within the city.

== History ==
=== Early years ===
First inaugurated on August 16, 1948, the library initially operated in a one-storey building next to the old Post Office building at the back of the Old Quezon City Hall along then-named Highway 54 (now Epifanio De los Santos Avenue). The initial collection of the library consisted of 4,000 book volumes donated by the National Library of the Philippines.

=== Expansion and main library transfers ===
In response to the growing population of the city, a branch of the library was opened in the Project 3 area in 1953 under the administration of then Mayor Ignacio Santos-Diaz. The following year, 8 additional branches were opened in different districts of the city. The Main Library transferred in 1957 to the Old City Hall Building where it occupied a more spacious space.

Within the same year, City Ordinance No. 3559 was approved by the Quezon City Council approved which defined the powers and duties of the library's librarian and superintendent.

The main library vacated the old city hall building and moved to the Lion's International Building at Bernardo Park which stands in an area donated by the Lion's International to the city government. The main library moved to the New Quezon City Hall Building's ground floor where it operated for ten years before transferring to a dedicated building. An inauguration ceremony held on August 6, 1984 by Pacencia J. Buendia, former City Superintendent of Libraries, was held to mark the move.

The number of branches of the library grew to 21 by late 2016. This figure includes the main library. The main library re-opened once again in February 2017 in a newly built three-story building also located within the city hall compound.

== Main Library ==
The Main Library's location has been moved or reassigned several times throughout the history of the Quezon City Public Library. The library is currently housed in a three-story building within the Quezon City Hall Complex which was inaugurated and opened by Mayor Herbert Bautista along with City Librarian Emelita Villanueva on February 6, 2017. The building for the main library has been planned since 2010. The library building's facilities include a cafe, a children's corner, a function room, and a puppeteer's room. Computers are also available for public use.

The first floor of the building hosts the reference section, Filipiniana section, periodicals, archives and materials on local history. Resources on law research, extension library services, technical service, district libraries and inventory, and multi-media are offered on the library's second floor.

The library can accommodate up to 1,000 people daily including those availing e-government services.

=== Collection ===
In May 2017 it was reported that the collection of the main library comprises 18,131 books and 71 computers meant for public use of online public access catalog, general internet use, and encoding.

== Reception ==
The National Library of the Philippines and National Commission for Culture and the Arts awarded the library third place in the 2016 Outstanding Public Libraries which was held in November 2016.
