= Quezon City Hall =

Government building in Quezon City, Philippines

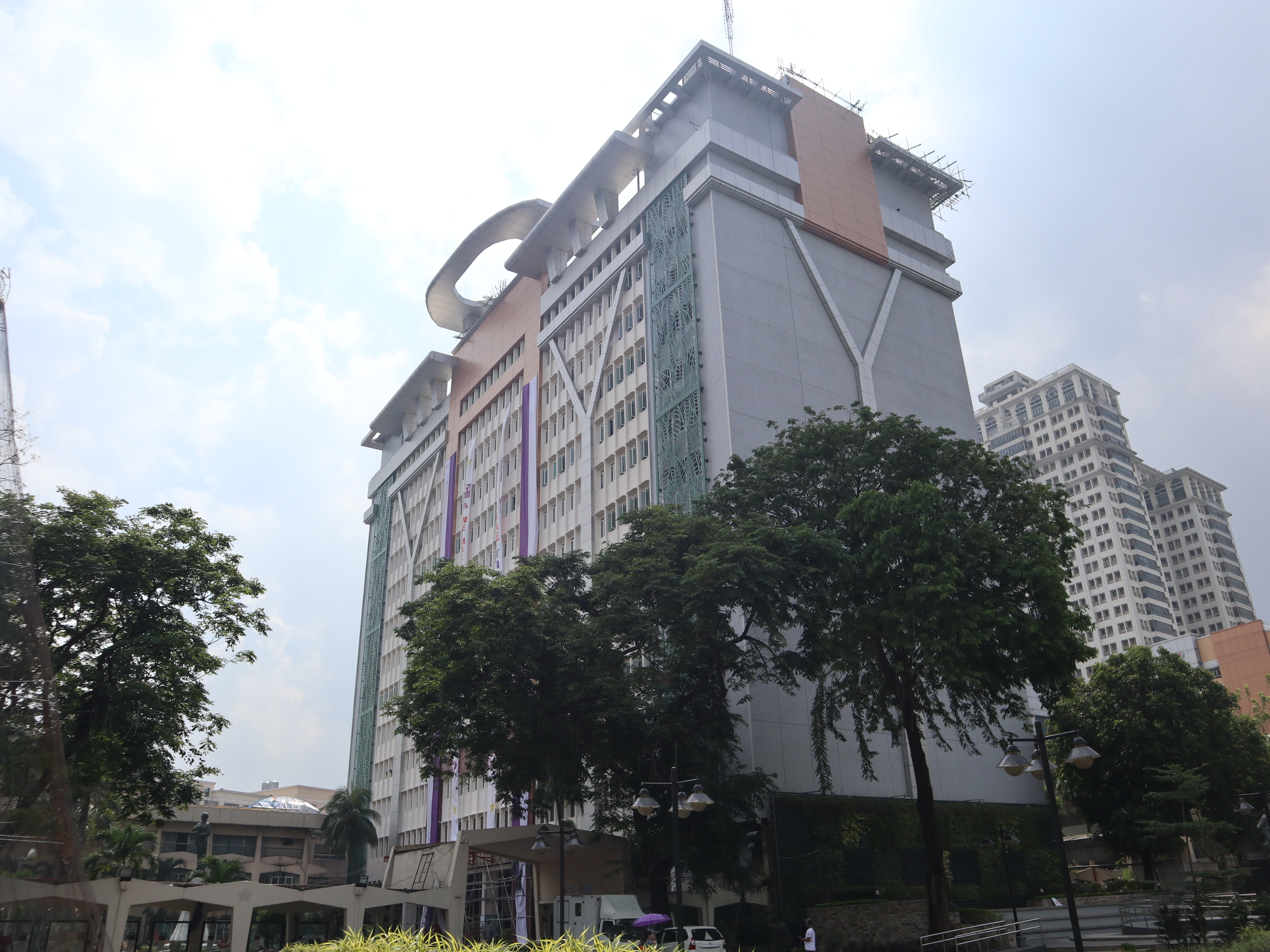
- Quezon City Hall in 2021
- Interactive map of the Quezon City Hall area

General information
- Status: Completed
- Location: Quezon City, Philippines
- Coordinates: 14°38′48″N 121°03′00″E
- Construction started: 1964
- Inaugurated: January 1, 1972

Technical details
- Floor count: 14

Other information
- Public transit: 5 7 Quezon City Hall; 1 2 4 5 6 7 8 Quezon City Hall; Future: 8 Quezon Memorial

The Quezon City Hall is a government building located along Elliptical Road. It houses the office of the Mayor of Quezon City, while the Quezon City Council is in the adjacent Legislative Wing.

== History ==
The first location of the city hall was at the corner of Aurora Boulevard and Highway 54 (now EDSA), beside Cubao Elementary School. It was transferred within the grounds now occupied by the Ramon Magsaysay (Cubao) High School sometime in the 1950s during the administration of Acting Mayor Ponciano Bernardo, an engineer appointed to the political post by then-President Manuel Roxas.

In the 1949 master plan for Quezon City, it was planned that the Quezon City Hall would be built at the site currently occupied by the East Avenue Medical Center. The present city hall was constructed on land designated as civic center from 1964 to 1972 and completed under the watch of Mayor Norberto Amoranto.
