= University of the Philippines Diliman Police =

- Abbreviation: UPDP

Agency overview
- Formed: 1977
- Preceding agency: UP Security Division

Jurisdictional structure
- Operations jurisdiction: University of the Philippines Diliman, Quezon City, Philippines
- Specialist jurisdiction: Buildings and lands occupied or explicitly controlled by the educational institution and the institution's personnel, public entering the buildings, immediate precincts

Operational structure
- Agency executives: John S. Baroña, Chief Security Officer; Ruben Villaluna, Officer in Charge

The University of the Philippines Diliman Police (UPDP) is the campus police of the Diliman campus of the University of the Philippines in Quezon City, Philippines.

The police force is not a part of the national government's Philippine National Police.

== Role and responsibilities ==
The UP Diliman Police is a police force which operates within the Diliman campus of the University of the Philippines. It was established in 1977 by the university's board of regent, replacing the UP Security Division.

The organization conducts typical law enforcement practices within the campus including enforcing rules and regulations, maintaining public order, and conducting investigations on crime reports.

The UP Diliman Police also conducts intelligence work, typically related to rumors regarding inter-fraternity conflicts. The university police also has the power of arrest within the campus.

The most common crime the campus police deals with is theft.

== Relations ==
=== National government ===
The UP Diliman Police is independent of the Philippine National Police (PNP) of the national government. It is not part of the PNP's hierarchy. Although initially prior to its placement under the Office of the Vice Chancellor for Community Affairs (OVCCA) of the university it was under the National Police Commission (NAPOLCOM).

The UP Diliman Police served as the primary police body within the campus until January 2021, when the 1989 UP–DND accord was unilaterally terminated by the Department of National Defense (DND). Under the accord, the national government's law enforcement agencies including the PNP and the military cannot enter any of the UP's campuses, including the main campus in Diliman, without prior notice. Prior to this period, when the UP Diliman Police arrest a suspect within its campus in a criminal case, it hands over the suspect to the Anonas Police Station (Police Station 9) of the Quezon City Police District after the campus police conducts its own investigation.

=== Other university organizations ===
The UP Diliman Police are assisted by contractually hired security guards colloquially referred to as "Blue Guards" who are often posted at the university campus' entrances. They are also augmented by the Special Services Brigade (SSB) which has a similar role to barangay tanods in a barangay.

== Administration ==
The security agencies of the University of the Philippines, including the UP Diliman Police is under the supervision and control of the Chief Security Officer (CSO). The UP Diliman Police itself is headed by an Officer-in-Charge.

== See also ==
- 1989 University of the Philippines–Department of National Defense accord
