= Ponciano Bernardo =

Filipino politician from Quezon City (1905–1949)

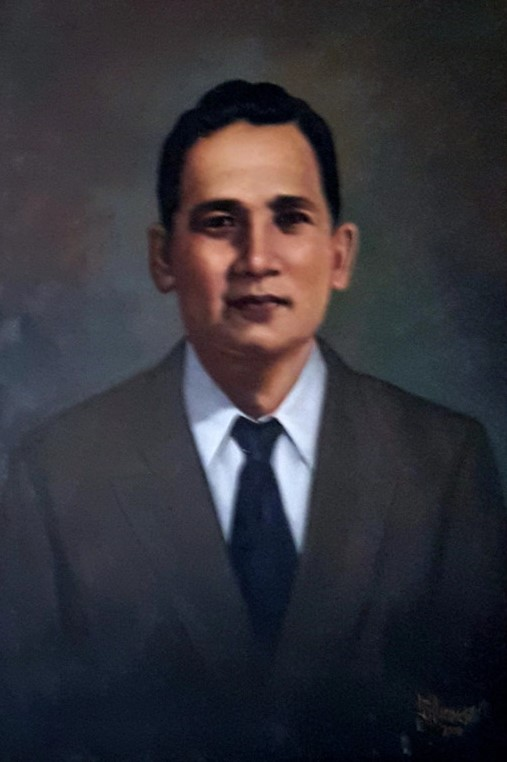
- Painted by Luisito Villanueva, c. 2000

2nd Mayor of Quezon City
- In office December 24, 1946 – April 28, 1949
- Vice Mayor: Matias Defensor (1946–1947); Gregorio B. Roxas (1948–1949)
- Preceded by: Tomás Morató
- Succeeded by: Nicanor Roxas

Vice Mayor of Quezon City
- In office November 10, 1939 – July 19, 1942
- Mayor: Tomás Morató
- Preceded by: Vicente Fragante
- Succeeded by: Matias Defensor

Personal details
- Born: Ponciano Azarcon Bernardo; December 2, 1905 Santa Rosa, Nueva Ecija, Philippine Islands
- Died: April 28, 1949 (aged 43) Bongabon, Nueva Ecija, Philippines
- Cause of death: Assassination
- Party: Independent
- Spouse: Josefina Martinez-Bernardo
- Children: 8
- Education: University of the Philippines
- Profession: Civil engineer

Ponciano Azarcon Bernardo (December 2, 1905 – April 28, 1949) was a Filipino engineer and politician who served as mayor of Quezon City, holding the position from 1947 until his assassination in 1949. It was during his tenure that Quezon City was designated as the capital city of the Philippines.

== Early life, education and family ==
Ponciano Azarcon Bernardo was born in Santa Rosa, Nueva Ecija. His father was a son of Pandi, Bulacan Province who had migrated to Papaya (now General Tinio), Nueva Ecija with his cousin Francisco Bernardo Oliveros of Papaya, whose two sisters were left behind in Pandi Luisa Bernardo Oliveros-Cruz and Rosenda Bernardo Oliveros-Contreras as well as the rest of the family and their cousins Mariano Bernardo, Catalino Bernardo, Valentina Bernardo whose sons and grandson became mayors of Bocaue, Bulacan Atty. Matias Bernardo Ramirez, Balagtas, Bulacan Mamerto Carpio Bernardo, Pandi, Bulacan Atty. Jose Espina Bernardo and Mamerto Carpio Bernardo, 'The Father of Pandi, Bulacan' and Angat, Bulacan Benito Bernardo Cruz.

Bernardo married Josefina Bernardo (nee Martinez), and the couple had eight children: Carrie, Josefina, Ponciano Jr., Noli, Juliet, Marichu, Sonny and Cherry.

Bernardo finished his primary and secondary education in Cabanatuan, and entered the University of the Philippines as a civil engineering student. He graduated from there in 1927.

== Career ==
After graduation, Bernardo joined the Bureau of Public Works - Department of Public Works and Highways. In 1929, he was named as an assistant provincial engineer of Tayabas, the home province of Manuel L. Quezon, who would become president in 1935. Bernardo also held various provincial posts as a government engineer in Baguio and Antique. In 1940, President Manuel L. Quezon appointed him as vice-mayor and city engineer of the newly established Quezon City.

On December 24, 1946, Bernardo was appointed mayor of Quezon City by President Sergio Osmeña. He was sworn into office on January 1, 1947. During his tenure, in 1948, that Quezon City became the capital of the Philippines in lieu of Manila.

Under Bernardo's leadership, a city police force - Philippine National Police was constituted and a new city hall was constructed in Cubao. Funds were also allocated for the construction of a park later named Bernardo Park, a market in Galas, and a public high school.

== Death ==
On April 28, 1949, Bernardo, along with former First Lady Aurora Quezon and several others, were killed in an ambush in Bongabon, Nueva Ecija. They were en route to President Quezon's hometown of Baler to dedicate a hospital in memory of the late President.

== Legacy ==
An elementary school and a high school in Quezon City have been named in memory of Ponciano A. Bernardo: Ponciano Bernardo High School in Barangay Kaunlaran, Cubao, Quezon City, as well as Bernardo Park.

Political offices
Preceded by Vicente Fragante	Vice Mayor of Quezon City; 1939–1942	Succeeded by Matias Defensor
Preceded by Tomás Morató	Mayor of Quezon City; 1946–1949	Succeeded by Nicanor A. Roxas
