= Quezon Memorial Circle station =

MRT Lines 7 and 8 stop in Quezon City, Philippines

ML02	Quezon Memorial Circle
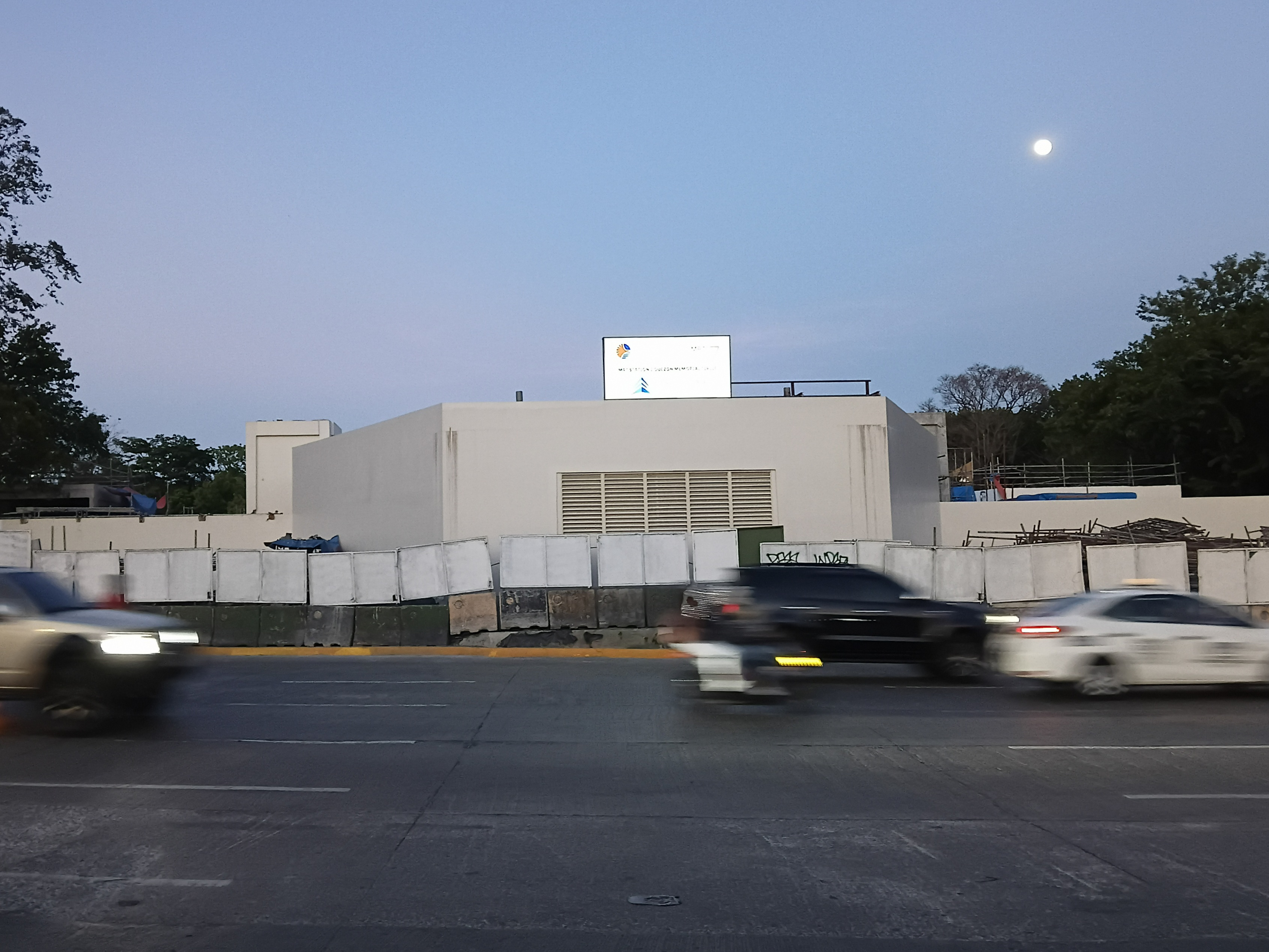
- The station under construction in April 2026

General information
- Location: Elliptical Road; Pinyahan, Quezon City; Philippines
- Coordinates: 14°39′08″N 121°02′51″E
- Owner: SMC Mass Rail Transit 7 Inc.
- Line: MRT Line 7
- Distance: 1.988 km (1.235 mi)
- Platforms: 1 island platform
- Tracks: 2
- Connections: 6 7 17 34 49 Quezon City Hall; 1 2 4 5 6 7 8 Quezon City Hall

Construction
- Structure type: Underground
- Accessible: Disabled access

Other information
- Status: Under construction

History
- Opening: 2027

Services
Preceding station	Manila MRT	Following station
North EDSA Terminus	MRT Line 7	University Avenue towards San Jose Del Monte
Location

Quezon Memorial Circle station is an under-construction Metro Rail Transit (MRT) station located on the MRT Line 7 (MRT-7) and the proposed MRT Line 8 (MRT-8) systems within the Quezon Memorial Circle, Quezon City.

Close landmarks include the Ninoy Aquino Parks and Wildlife Center, Department of Agriculture Building, Quezon City Hall, Department of Agrarian Reform Building, the National Housing Authority (Philippines) and PTV Complex.

== History ==
The groundbreaking ceremony for the Manila Metro Rail Transit System Line 7 (MRT-7) took place at the site of the Quezon Memorial station on April 20, 2016. The initial design of the station was approved as far back as the term of former Quezon City Mayor Herbert Bautista. It was also planned that a 2,500-square-meter (27,000 sq ft) establishment would be constructed above-ground and it would expand to 11,000 square meters (120,000 sq ft).

During development of the station, the Quezon City government suspended above-ground construction on February 18, 2020, as the proposed structure claimed to damage the park's integrity. The current space for construction is more than five times the indicated 4,997 square meters (53,790 sq ft). Mayor Joy Belmonte ordered a temporary cease and desist order on the above-ground construction of the station. Belmonte then discussed the issue with San Miguel Corporation, EEI Corporation, and the Department of Transportation for further clarification. At that time there was still no major above-ground structures at the site with most of the construction work still taking place underground. The design of the above-ground structure for the station was also still in the finalization phase.

On February 28, 2020, authorities from San Miguel Corporation and EEI Corporation presented a revised design of the above-ground area of the station consisting of only a utility room. It reduced almost 11,000 square meters to 426 square meters (4,590 sq ft), and the height from 12 meters (39 ft) to 6 meters (20 ft). Belmonte lifted the temporary cease and desist order on the same day.

== Station details ==
Quezon Memorial Circle station is one of two underground stations on the MRT-7. It is located underneath the Quezon Memorial Circle, a national park in Pinyahan, Quezon City, enclosed by the Elliptical Road. The station is nearby many park museums like the Quezon Heritage House, Presidential Car Museum, and the Quezon Memorial Shrine.

Quezon Memorial Circle station will serve several landmarks around Elliptical Road. These include the Ninoy Aquino Parks and Wildlife Center and several government buildings, particularly the Quezon City Hall, Department of Agriculture, Department of Agrarian Reform, and the National Housing Authority. The station will be connected to various local bus routes, including the Quezon City Bus Service, via the city hall's bus stop.
