= U.P. Campus, Quezon City =

Barangay in Quezon City, Philippines

U.P. Campus
- Barangay
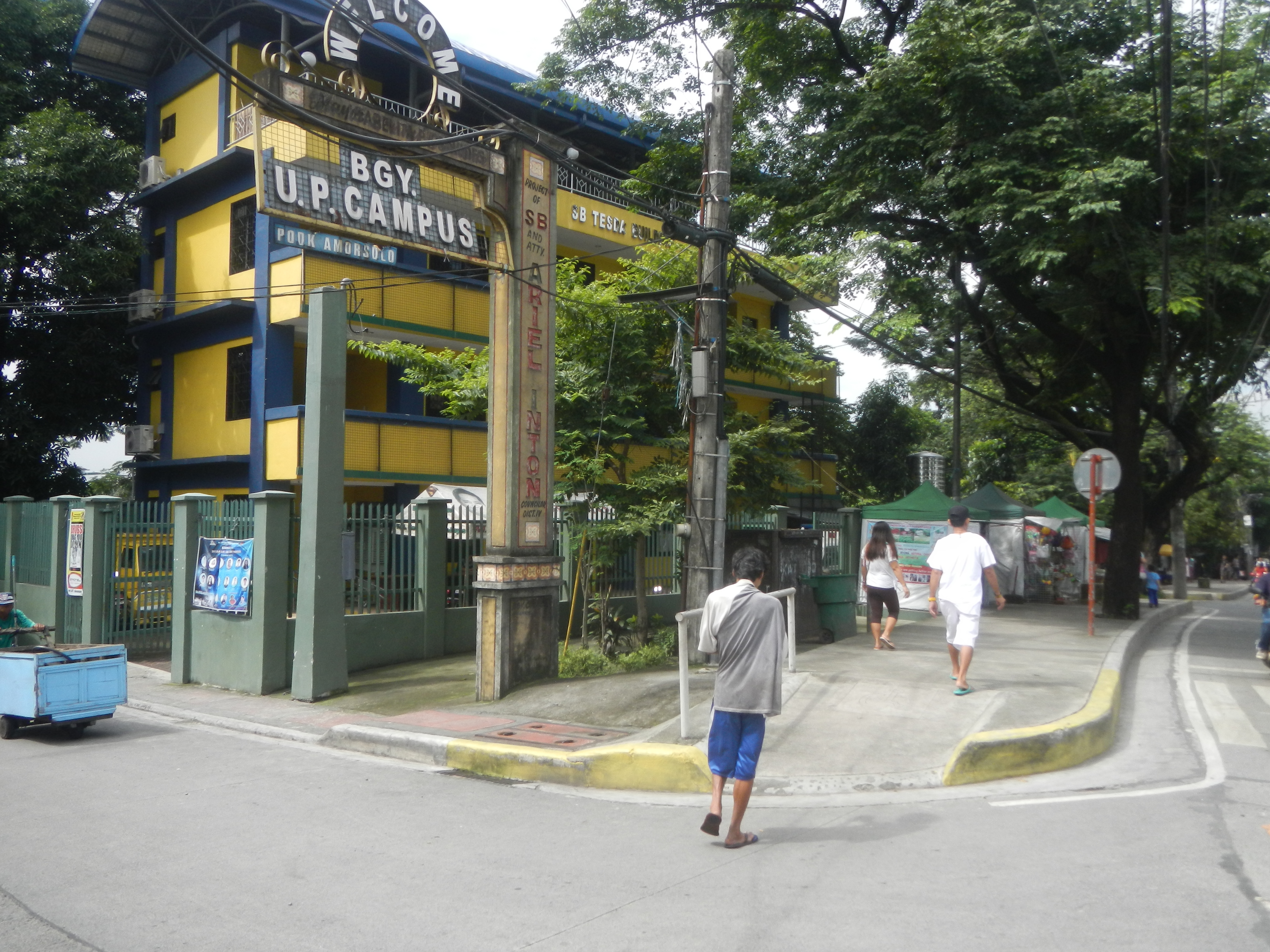

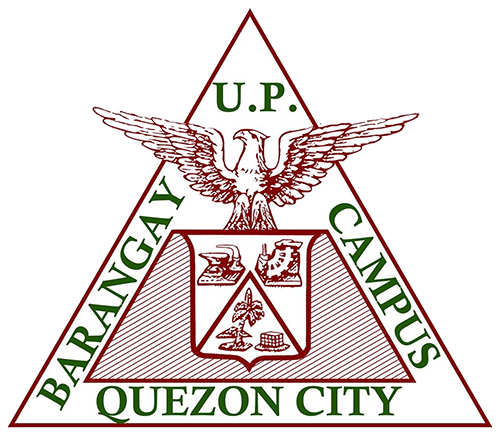
- Seal

- Location of Barangay U.P. Campus within Metro Manila
- Coordinates: 14°39′18″N 121°03′48″E
- Country: Philippines
- Region: National Capital Region
- City: Quezon City
- District: 4th District of Quezon City
- Established: June 25, 1975

Government
  - Type: Barangay
  - Barangay Captain: Zenaida Lectura

Area
  - Land: 4.93 km^{2} (1.90 sq mi)

Population (2020)
  - Total: 47,127
- Time zone: UTC+8 (PST)
- Postal Code: 1101
- Area code: 2
- PSGC: 137404124

U.P. Campus is a barangay in Quezon City, Philippines. As its name suggests, a large part of the barangay is occupied by the main Diliman campus of the University of the Philippines (UP). UP Diliman, the university campus itself, covers seven other barangays in Quezon City, namely Krus na Ligas, San Vicente, Botocan, Culiat, Old Capitol Site, Pansol, and Vasra.

== History ==
The barangay was established on June 25, 1975 through Executive Order No. 24 issued by then Quezon City Mayor Norberto Amoranto. The mayoral order itself was pursuant to Presidential Decree 557 issued by then President Ferdinand Marcos on September 21, 1974 which mandates the conversion of barrios into barangays.

== Government ==
Barangay U.P. Campus is distinct from the University of the Philippines (UP) Diliman campus which is mainly inside the barangay. The barangay is a local government unit (LGU) and is headed by a barangay captain, while the UP Diliman Campus is an academic institution, headed by a chancellor. It is also not to be confused with Barangay U.P. Village, located adjacent to it to the west.

== Demographics ==
Barangay U.P. Campus, according to a census in 2012, has a squatter population of at least 15,500 households, each having an average of 4.5 members.

== Security ==
The UP Diliman Campus has its own independent police force, the UP Diliman Police, which also manages traffic within the Diliman campus. The local government of Barangay U.P. Campus is in charge of security for areas under its jurisdiction that are outside the university's campus grounds.
