= Bayaniverse =

Filipino film series

- Directed by: Jerrold Tarog
- Written by: Various
- Starring: John Arcilla (1st film); Paulo Avelino (2nd film); Jericho Rosales (3rd film)
- Production company: TBA Studios
- Running time: Total (3 feature films): 407 minutes
- Country: Philippines
- Language: Filipino
- Box office: ₱476 million (3 films)

The Bayaniverse (stylized BAYANIVerse) is a series of films directed by Jerrold Tarog and associated with TBA Studios.

== Films ==
Overview
Film	Release date	Director(s)	Screenwriter(s)	Production company
Heneral Luna	September 9, 2015	Jerrold Tarog	Jerrold Tarog; Henry Francia; E. A. Rocha	Artikulo Uno Productions (Note: TBA Studios was not yet established. Retroactively credited as a TBA Studios film)
Angelito (short film)	February 15, 2017	Jerrold Tarog	Jerrold Tarog	TBA Studios
Goyo: The Boy General	September 5, 2018	Jerrold Tarog	Jerrold Tarog; Rody Vera	TBA Studios; Artikulo Uno Productions (Note: Artikulo Uno is credited independently from TBA Studios); Globe Studios
Quezon	October 15, 2025	Jerrold Tarog	Jerrold Tarog; Rody Vera	TBA Studios

=== Heneral Luna (2015) ===
The first feature film of Bayaniverse was Heneral Luna which focuses on the Philippine Revolution general, Antonio Luna. It was based on a 1998 script by E. A. Rocha and Henry Hunt Francia. Francia died before the film's release. Eventually, Leo Martinez convinced Rocha to submit the script to the Film Development Council of the Philippines. Jerrold Tarog, who had separately developed an interest in making a film about Antonio Luna obtained permission to use the script and revised it accordingly. Production for Luna was publicly known as early as April 2014.

Intentions to create a trilogy around Heneral Luna was publicized by Tarog as early as August 2015. Tarog said there are plans to make it the first of a trilogy if it generated enough revenues. The first film had its nationwide premier in the Philippines on September 9, 2015. However the film had prior release in select theaters in the United States and Middle East a month prior.

=== Goyo: The Boy General (2018) ===
In 2017, Artikulo Uno alongside Tuko Film Productions and Buchi Boy Entertainment set up TBA Studios. The second film Goyo: The Boy General centering around a young Filipino general Gregorio del Pilar of the Philippine–American War was produced with a budget three times bigger than that of Luna. The newly formed TBA Studios as well as Artikulo Uno and Globe Studios are the credited production studios behind the film. The film was released on September 5, 2018.

=== Quezon (2025) ===
Production started on the third and final film of the trilogy, Quezon, in March 2025. This film is a biopic that dramatizes the life of Manuel L. Quezon, who served as president of the Commonwealth of the Philippines from 1935 until his death in 1944. In the film, Benjamin Alves portrays Quezon as a young adult, while Jericho Rosales portrays the older Quezon. Also featured are Iain Glen (as Governor-General Leonard Wood), Romnick Sarmenta (as Sergio Osmeña), JC Santos (as Manuel Roxas), Cris Villanueva (as Joven Hernándo), Karylle (as Aurora Quezon), and Mon Confiado (as Emilio Aguinaldo).

Pre-production of the film began in 2019, with a planned release date of 2022. Production was delayed after Tarog was tapped to direct the film Darna, which was later cancelled. Subsequent delays were related to the COVID-19 pandemic.

=== Short film ===
A short film bridging the events of Heneral Luna to that of Goyo was released on February 15 in tandem of the screening of the feature film I'm Drunk, I Love You. The 20-minute short film, titled Angelito, focused on the fate of the brothers Jose and Manuel Bernal after Luna's assassination through the perspective of the third and youngest brother Angel. Art Acuña, Alex Medina, Arron Villaflor and Carlo Aquino reprised their roles in Heneral Luna. Tomas Santos plays the main lead.

== Production ==
For the Bayaniverse, Tarog intended to portray the historical figures in the film series often regarded as national heroes as "flawed characters". Tarog mentioned that the series was inspired from Nick Joaquin's A Question of Heroes, which discusses the legacies of historical figures.

The main focus of the two next films after Heneral Luna was already known back in 2015; the other two films would individually focus on Gregorio del Pilar and Manuel L. Quezon. Tarog also brought up the possibility of a fourth film featuring female revolutionary Teresa Magbanua, who led troops in the Visayas region during the war.

== Cast and characters ==
Character	Feature films			Short film
Character	Heneral Luna	Goyo: The Boy General	Quezon	Angelito
Antonio Luna	John Arcilla			
Emilio Aguinaldo	Mon Confiado	Mon Confiado	Mon Confiado	
Joven Hernándo (young)	Arron Villaflor	Arron Villaflor	Arron Villaflor	Arron Villaflor
Joven Hernándo (older)		Cris Villanueva	Cris Villanueva	
Paco Román	Joem Bascon			
Eduardo Rusca	Archie Alemania	Archie Alemania	Joross Gamboa	
José Bernal	Alex Medina			Alex Medina
Manuel Bernal	Art Acuña	Art Acuña		Art Acuña
Angelito Bernal				Tomas Santos
Apolinario Mabini	Epy Quizon	Epy Quizon		
Isabel	Mylene Dizon			
Laureana Luna	Bing Pimentel			
Felipe Buencamino	Nonie Buencamino	Nonie Buencamino		
Pedro Janolino	Ketchup Eusebio		Ketchup Eusebio	
Tomás Mascardo	Lorenz Martinez			
José Alejandrino	Alvin Anson	Alvin Anson		
Pedro Paterno	Leo Martinez	Leo Martinez		
Lt. García	Ronnie Lazaro	Ronnie Lazaro		
Gregorio del Pilar	Paulo Avelino	Paulo Avelino		
Vicente Enríquez	Carlo Aquino	Carlo Aquino		Carlo Aquino
Manuel L. Quezon (young)	Benjamin Alves	Benjamin Alves	Benjamin Alves	
Manuel L. Quezon (older)		TJ Trinidad	Jericho Rosales	
Remedios Nable José		Gwen Zamora		
Felicidad Aguinaldo		Empress Schuck		
Hilaria Aguinaldo		Che Ramos		
Aurora Quezon			Karylle	
Sergio Osmeña			Romnick Sarmenta	
Manuel Roxas			JC Santos	
Leonard Wood			Iain Glen	

== Reception ==
=== Box office performance ===
Film	Release date	Box office revenue	Budget	Ref.
Heneral Luna	September 9, 2015	₱256 million	₱80 million	
Goyo: The Boy General	September 5, 2018	₱120 million	₱240 million	
Quezon	October 15, 2025	₱100 million	—	
Total		₱476,000,000	₱320 million	

=== Critical response ===
Film	Rotten Tomatoes	Film Development Council of the Philippines
Heneral Luna	78% (9 reviews)	–
Goyo: The Boy General	40% (5 reviews)	Grade A
Quezon	—	—
