= Quezon (film) =

2025 historical film by Jerrold Tarog

- Theatrical release poster
- Directed by: Jerrold Tarog
- Written by: Jerrold Tarog; Rody Vera
- Produced by: Daphne O. Chiu-Soon
- Starring: Jericho Rosales; Karylle; Mon Confiado; Arron Villaflor; Romnick Sarmenta; Cris Villanueva; JC Santos; Iain Glen; Jake Macapagal
- Cinematography: Pong Ignacio
- Edited by: Jerrold Tarog
- Music by: Jerrold Tarog
- Production company: TBA Studios
- Release date: October 15, 2025
- Running time: 139 minutes
- Country: Philippines
- Languages: Filipino; English
- Box office: ₱100 million

Quezon is a 2025 Philippine biographical film co-written, edited, composed, and directed by Jerrold Tarog. The film portrays the political rise of the former Philippines' President Manuel L. Quezon, played by Jericho Rosales. It is the third and final installment in TBA Studios's Bayaniverse trilogy. Additional cast members include Karylle as Aurora Quezon, Mon Confiado as Emilio Aguinaldo, Iain Glen as Leonard Wood, and Arron Villaflor as Joven Hernando, a fictional journalist present in previous Bayaniverse films.

Quezon is produced by TBA Studios with assistance from the Film Development Council of the Philippines. A film featuring Quezon was announced as a conclusion to Bayaniverse in 2018, and was planned for a 2022 release in 2019. Planned as a political thriller, the production team eventually developed the film as a dark comedy. Filming began on March 2025 and concluded in June 2025. The film was released in the Philippines on October 15, 2025, and internationally in October and November 2025. Quezon generally received positive reception on its cast performances, cinematography, and approach on portraying Quezon and historical events. The film received mixed responses from the Philippine Department of Education and members of the Quezon family.

== Plot ==
In 1901, Major Manuel Quezon meets Captain Eduardo Rusca and journalist Joven Hernando on his way to surrender to the Americans. Quezon gives a coin to Joven as a reminder that "principle is most important" and promises to make the Quezon name famous. The two become friends; Quezon enters politics and uses his patronage to provide Joven with his own newspaper, Alerta.

Quezon's political stardom rises during the American period, as he establishes himself as a leader of the Nacionalista Party and a populist Senate president who is seeking to achieve independence for the Philippines, while discreetly receiving support from the Americans and the elite. At the same time, he has a love-hate relationship with the Speaker of the House of Representatives, Sergio Osmeña, and grooms a young legislator, Manuel Roxas, to undermine Osmeña for the upcoming elections. When Leonard Wood becomes Governor-General and complains to Washington, D.C. about the corruption of Filipino leaders and the Philippines' unpreparedness for independence, Quezon leads his colleagues in a prolonged political standoff against Wood. Quezon seeks the support of Emilio Aguinaldo, now the head of the Association of Veterans of the Revolution, in denouncing Wood, but seethes when Aguinaldo sympathizes with Wood instead.

Quezon tries to charm Wood in a drinking session, but is instead blackmailed by Wood into desisting from further agitation for independence by presenting an archive of his previous legal cases, including rape and bigamy. Wood later dies in office, and a jealous Quezon scuttles an agreement made by Osmeña and Roxas with the Americans for Philippine independence, the Hare–Hawes–Cutting Act. He then secures his own deal, the Tydings–McDuffie Act, albeit containing similar terms. This allows him to run for president of the upcoming Commonwealth election. He convinces a reluctant Osmeña to become his running mate by promising him the presidency after one term. At the same time, he insults Aguinaldo for supporting Wood, leading Aguinaldo to contest the election against Quezon.

Quezon commissions Joven and his daughter Nadia to make hagiographical films of him, unaware that Joven and Nadia are also making unflattering versions of them. Joven also publishes an exposé from Pedro Janolino revealing Aguinaldo's responsibility for the assassination of Antonio Luna. (Note: As depicted in Heneral Luna) As Quezon proceeds to confiscate Aguinaldo's farmstead and withdraw his pension, Aguinaldo and his running mate, Raymundo Melliza, learn that Quezon abandoned his first wife, Ana Ricardo, during the war before marrying Aurora Aragón. Melliza invites Ana to an event in Bataan attended by Aguinaldo, Gregorio Aglipay, and Quezon. This enrages Quezon, but Aguinaldo loses his nerve and fails to expose Quezon. Meanwhile, Joven goes to a campaign sortie by Aguinaldo in Malolos, only to see Janolino sabotaging the event by staging a funeral-themed protest. Melliza angrily points out to Joven that Janolino is Quezon's sergeant-at-arms in the Senate. Disillusioned, Joven writes an article in Alerta denouncing Quezon as a deceitful and corrupt politician, resulting in the newspaper's closure.

After Quezon wins the election and is inaugurated as President, Joven confronts him about Alerta's closure. Quezon denies involvement, and the two debate over truth and compromise before Joven returns the coin Quezon once gave him. Joven, Nadia, and Rusca watch the critical Quezon films at the Hernando' cinema, but are interrupted by Quezon, whose secretary, Manuel Nieto, has been spying on the Hernando family. Joven chastises Quezon for his corrupt ways and lust for power, but Quezon reminds him of how his patronage gave Hernando's family their livelihood. Joven ends his association with Quezon, who hands back the coin Joven gave him.

Despite his promise to Osmeña, Quezon arranges for a constitutional amendment allowing his reelection in 1941. As tuberculosis further weakens him and World War II breaks out, he is inaugurated in Corregidor. As he is wheeled back inside the Malinta Tunnel, he lashes out at Osmeña, knowing that the latter will live to see an independent Philippines while he will not, exclaiming, "I am the Filipino people, I am the Philippines!"

An epilogue reveals that Osmeña succeeded to the presidency after Quezon’s death, but lost his reelection bid to Roxas, who became the first president of the post-Commonwealth Third Republic, while Aguinaldo outlived Quezon, Osmeña, and Roxas. A radio set plays "Mambo Magsaysay" in the mid-credits scene.

== Cast ==
- Jericho Rosales as Manuel L. Quezon
  - Benjamin Alves as young Manuel L. Quezon
- Karylle as Aurora Quezon
- Joross Gamboa as Eduardo Rusca
- Ketchup Eusebio as Pedro Janolino
- Romnick Sarmenta as Sergio Osmeña
- JC Santos as Manuel A. Roxas
- Jake Macapagal as Manuel M. Nieto
- Mon Confiado as Emilio F. Aguinaldo
- Bodjie Pascua as Raymundo Melliza
- Iain Glen as Leonard Wood
- Sue Prado as Ana Ricardo
- Arron Villaflor as Joven Hernando
  - Cris Villanueva as older Joven Hernando
- Therese Malvar as Nadia Hernando
- Nico Locco as Sergeant Johnston
- Angeli Bayani as Maria Agoncillo

== Production ==
Quezon is directed by Jerrold Tarog, who is also its composer, and is produced by TBA Studios' president Daphne O. Chiu-Soon. The film's scriptwriters are Tarog and Rody Vera. Pong Ignacio served as the cinematographer. Quezon is the latest addition to Bayaniverse, a cinematic series of historical films which includes Heneral Luna and Goyo: The Boy General. It is a standalone film.

=== Development and pre-production ===
It was reported in 2018 that the sequel to Goyo would be about President Manuel L. Quezon, with Benjamin Alves and TJ Trinidad set to reprise their roles as younger and older versions of Quezon respectively. However, Tarog's work on the sequel was postponed after Star Cinema hired him in 2018 to direct Darna. While Tarog focused on filming for Darna, producer EA Rocha stated in 2019 that pre-production work on the potential Quezon film would continue. The film was planned to undergo pre-production work in 2021, with its scriptwriting planned after the production of Darna, and set for a 2022 release.

In 2021, Tarog teased the potential script co-written with Rody Vera on Twitter (X), and stated that it was still to be submitted for approval. The project would later receive a "large budget production fund" support from the Film Development Council of the Philippines as a part of its CreatePHFilms Funding Program Cycle 1 of 2024. Amazon Prime Video would have funded the film's production, but Quezon lost its source for production funds when Prime Video shut down original film production in Southeast Asia in 2024. In January 2025, TBA Studios confirmed that the filming of Quezon would commence in March of the same year.

Quezon was initially planned as a political thriller, but eventually became a dark comedy after a further research. Tarog also found comedy and satire to be the most appropriate genres for the film. The film has four segments that narrate Quezon's political career. The four segments feature Quezon's conflicts against fictional journalist Joven Hernando, who appears in prior Bayaniverse films Goyo and Heneral Luna, Sergio Osmeña, Leonard Wood, and Emilio Aguinaldo. The film begins with a disclaimer that it is written with artistic license to communicate specific themes.

Mon Confiado announced his role as Aguinaldo on January 31, 2025, by posting a picture of the cast's read-through. On February 18, TBA Studios announced that Jericho Rosales would portray the role of Quezon, as Trinidad backed out due to prior commitments. On February 19, it was announced that Aaron Villaflor would portray as Joven Hernando. On March 16, TBA Studios confirmed that Iain Glen has been cast in the film and would portray the role of governor-general Leonard Wood.

=== Filming ===
In a social media post, TBA Studios announced the start of their filming for Quezon on March 18, 2025. The production shot several scenes in Manila, such as a theater in Santa Catalina College and at the National Museum of Fine Arts, which was the historic site of Quezon's presidential inauguration. Quezon was also filmed in San Juan, Batangas. The depiction of Quezon's election as senate president was arranged similar to a game of chess; 64 desks and chairs were made for the scene, and filming took place in an event venue in Las Piñas in place for Ayuntamiento de Manila. The characters' movements across the venue in the sequence also mimic the Immortal Game. The final scene of Quezon being wheeled into Malinta Tunnel was shot in the Centennial Tunnel in La Union. Filming concluded on June 11, 2025.

== Release ==
On July 4, 2025, TBA Studios released a poster for the film and announced that it would be released in the Philippines cinemas on October 15, 2025, and in international theaters afterward. The official trailer was released on August 19, 2025. TBA Studios announced that students and teachers are eligible for a discounted viewing fee of ₱250 in all Philippine cinemas that show Quezon. The film was released internationally in October and November 2025 in Guam, Australia, Canada, the Middle East, and other countries.

Ahead of its general release, a red carpet premier was held for Quezon at SM North EDSA in Quezon City on October 12, 2025. In an interview, producer Daphne Chiu-Soon mentioned that Quezon was deliberately not planned for a Metro Manila Film Festival premier, as the film would "[share] the theater with eight or 10 other entries with very limited screens".

Philippine publishing company Anvil Publishing hosted the Manila International Book Fair in which a book was released that detailed the film's production. A study guide written by historian Alvin Campomanes was also published online.

The film had its international film festival debut at the 45th Hawaiʻi International Film Festival on October 26, 2025. The film was presented in limelight at the 55th International Film Festival Rotterdam for its European premiere in February 2026.

=== Philippine government's response ===
On October 14, 2025, the Philippines' Department of Education released a memorandum to show their support for the film. It promoted the film to junior and senior high school students, and teachers to encourage the film's integration into classroom discussions as it's "designed to strengthen historical awareness, civic education, and appreciation of the arts among Filipino learners by providing creative, curriculum-aligned tools that make history both relevant and accessible," and it also offers a "compelling portrait of history while providing timely reflections on governance, leadership, and national identity".

== Reception ==
=== Box office and accolades ===
The film was released on October 15, 2025 in the Philippines, alongside The Marianas Web, and earned ₱6 million on its opening day and ₱30 million in 5 days. Filmmaker Jose Javier Reyes, head of the Film Development Council of the Philippines, expressed concerns that more viewers were seeing erotic entries to the CineSilip Film Festival than Quezon. As of February 9, 2026, the film has earned over ₱100 million. Quezon won the Best Actor, Best Director, Best Picture, Best Screenplay, and the Best Production Design awards at the 9th EDDYS.

=== Critical response ===
Several reviews of Quezon commended the film's cinematography, cast performances, and musical score. Some reviewers praised the performances of Glen, Villaflor, and Karylle, including the portrayals of Rosales and Alves as Quezon in separate eras. Moreover, Tatler Asia's Syrah Inocencio described the production design as a reminiscent of "the elegance and tension of the 1930s". However, Daily Tribune's Stephanie Mayo emphasized in a critical review that Sarmenta's forced high-pitched voice, and Rosales' gestures and "clipped English" remove immersion and authenticity in their performances. They also pointed out crude makeup in several characters, such as Sarmenta's penciled eyebrows curving upwards.

Several reviewers found the pacing of Quezon rapid, and its brisk editing suited Quezon's two-hour runtime for Manila Bulletin's Philip Cu Unjieng. Meanwhile, Mayo argued comparing the film's rapid pace and editing to Marvel Cinematic Universe films, and that the dramatic dialogue and sequences "[bursting] with brio" seem to show that "historical seriousness" in the film might bore the audience. The flashback scenes, shot as black-and-white silent films with comical movement and music, were comedic and effective devices according to historian Ambeth Ocampo. Esquire's Zach Yonzon found that the silent films serve as creative thematic chapter markers for "an otherwise unexciting story" filled with exposition. However, for Mayo, the flashback scenes result in a film being overstuffed and overextended. They also remarked that the movie seems to depend on "flashbacks, diegetic devices, and spoon-fed explanations". The film's comedic approach received positive reception from some reviewers; ABS-CBN's Fred Hawson exemplified this with the movie's comparison of the Quezon-Osmeña split with a married couple's quarrel. The Philippine Star's Jose Dalisay argued that Quezon should be interpreted as a theater through its stylized choreography and exaggerated characters.

Quezon yielded discussion on its historical accuracy and portrayal of historical figures such as Quezon's role on Philippine patronage politics. The study guide released with Quezon details the movie's historical accuracy. The events discussed in it include Quezon's attempts to influence Philippine newspapers mirrored by the fictional conflict with Joven, and his opposition to the Hare–Hawes–Cutting Act in fear of being uncredited for an independence law. It also acknowledges deviations on the portrayal of Pedro Janolino, who had died two years before the 1935 Philippine presidential election campaign, the lack of verifiable information on Ana Ricardo, and that Aguinaldo's pension was cancelled during the Philippine Commonwealth and not during the 1935 elections as the film shows. Ocampo noted that the movie parallels several primary sources stored at the Bentley Historical Library, such as the letters dated in 1929 requesting reports on Aguinaldo and a rape compliant against Quezon. Moreover, Quezon narrates complicated events such as the 1923 cabinet crisis and the Quezon-Osmeña split with humor and without oversimplifying, Xiao Chua, a historical consultant in the film's promotion, opined. Chua remarked that Wood was appropriately portrayed as a "conscientious administrator". Some reviewers also saw Quezon as a nod to early filmmaking in the Philippines through the fictional Hernando's cinema and a mention of Harris and Tait, producers of the Philippines' film, Zamboanga.

Some reviewers also found the portrayal of Quezon as non-hagiographical through showing the character in various perspectives. Yonzon appreciated the director's "care to balance Quezon’s charm against his unscrupulousness". However, Ocampo found the movie as an "iconoclastic treatment" by showing him as "a two-faced chameleon [...] and detestable" politician. Moreover, Hawson found Rosales's depiction of Quezon as "fiercely egotistical". Some reviewers contrasted the portrayal with that of 2018 film Quezon's Game; Mayo described Quezon's Game as showing Quezon with a "human restraint" against the other that may aim to represent Quezon as a parody and caricature. For The Philippine Star's Januar Junior Aguja, the film is also a cynical critique of Filipino people and politics. Joven, who seems to parallel ordinary Filipino people, eventually becomes complicit with Quezon's actions. Meanwhile, Rosales's character displays idealism and nationalism juxtaposed with an elitist attitude and egotistical manipulation. Some reviews also discussed the film's theme of history or politics as performance, and the film as a reflection of recurring and contemporary events such as the flood control projects scandal and politicians' opportunism. While criticizing the overstimulating pace of Quezon and classifying it as "between historical drama and cartoonish parody", Mayo commends the film's technical design and reflection on the origins of corruption.

=== Quezon family's response ===
Enrique "Ricky" Quezon Avanceña, a grandson of Manuel L. Quezon, criticized the film's satirical approach as admitted by director Tarog, saying it was a disrespectful and unserious portrayal of his grandfather. At the Q&A segment following the film's screening at the Power Plant Mall in Makati on October 23, 2025, he accused the filmmakers of "desecrating the memory" of his grandfather and using the claim of satire as a shield for historical inaccuracies to gain profit. TBA Studios responded by stating that while they respect his sentiments, the film is based on verified historical accounts, including Quezon's autobiography, with added fictional elements for thematic purposes.

John Arcilla, a grandnephew of Manuel L. Quezon who had portrayed Antonio Luna in the first Bayaniverse film Heneral Luna, supported Avanceña, and acknowledged that Quezon's living relatives should have been consulted in the film's production. He further remarked that the film's tone could be interpreted as satirical, citing the stylized depiction of early political rivalries and certain performance choices. However, Arcilla stated that even within this framing, the film's "preachy and direct characterization" of Quezon contributed to the discomfort he and his other relatives expressed.

Actress Pinky Amador, a great-grandchild of Manuel L. Quezon, posted on social media criticizing how the film showed only “one side” of Quezon, further adding that the usage of satirical and fictional elements could mislead Filipinos in the context of the film's endorsement by the Department of Education.

Historian and writer Manolo Quezon, an adopted grandson of Manuel L. Quezon, reviewed the film in a video published by Rappler on November 5, 2025.
