= Goyo: The Boy General =

2018 epic war film by Jerrold Tarog

- Theatrical release poster
- Filipino: Goyo: Ang Batang Heneral
- Directed by: Jerrold Tarog
- Written by: Jerrold Tarog; Rody Vera
- Produced by: Joe Alandy; Daphne O. Chiu
- Starring: Paulo Avelino; Carlo Aquino; Mon Confiado; Epy Quizon; Gwen Zamora; Empress Schuck; Alvin Anson; Rafa Siguion-Reyna
- Cinematography: Pong Ignacio
- Edited by: Jerrold Tarog
- Music by: Jerrold Tarog
- Production companies: TBA Studios; Artikulo Uno Productions; Globe Studios
- Release date: September 5, 2018
- Running time: 150 minutes
- Country: Philippines
- Language: Filipino
- Budget: ₱240 million (est. $4,073,000 USD)
- Box office: ₱120 million

Goyo: The Boy General (Filipino: Goyo: Ang Batang Heneral), or simply Goyo, is a 2018 Filipino epic war film starring Paulo Avelino as the titular "Boy General", Gregorio del Pilar, who fought and died at the Battle of Tirad Pass during the Philippine–American War. It was written, directed, edited, and scored by Jerrold Tarog, and is a sequel to the 2015 film Heneral Luna, which chronicled Antonio Luna's life and is the second installment of the Bayaniverse franchise. Additional members of the ensemble cast include Carlo Aquino, Mon Confiado, Epy Quizon, Gwen Zamora, Empress Schuck, Alvin Anson, and Rafa Siguion-Reyna. It was released on September 5, 2018. The third and final film in the Bayaniverse trilogy, Quezon, was released on October 15, 2025.

== Plot ==
Following the assassination of General Antonio Luna, (Note: Depicted in Heneral Luna (2015)) Gregorio "Goyo" del Pilar, a young and brash brigadier general, has been tasked by President Emilio Aguinaldo to hunt down Luna's loyalists who have been charged with treason. One such soldier, Major Manuel Bernal, is captured at the house of Mariano Nable José in Dagupan. Bernal is tortured into rejoining the army, but defiantly refuses and insults Goyo, calling him a "dog" for his loyalty to Aguinaldo; Bernal is then executed. Aguinaldo then promotes Goyo to major general of Pangasinan. With a relative decrease in hostilities, Goyo, along with his older brother Julian, his friend Colonel Vicente Enriquez, and photographer Joven Hernando, spends the entire summer in Dagupan attending festivals and courting Remedios, Mariano's daughter.

Meanwhile, Aguinaldo approaches former prime minister Apolinario Mabini and offers him to rejoin the government as chief justice, which he reluctantly accepts (later in the film, the appointment never materialized). When Mabini asks Aguinaldo about Luna's death, he deflects the question. Elsewhere, General José Alejandrino, Luna's former ally spared from the purge, goes to Manila to negotiate with the American Generals Elwell Stephen Otis and Arthur MacArthur Jr. who both refuse to recognize the sovereignty of the First Philippine Republic unless the Filipinos surrender. The negotiations failed and the war intensifies. Unable to launch a counterattack, Aguinaldo orders the army to retreat to the Cordillera Range with Goyo commanding the vanguard. During the long and exhausting march through the mountains, the army is plagued by persistent American attacks, internal tensions from Luna's old unit, as well as hunger and disease. Goyo is further pressured when Aguinaldo's mother and son are captured.

The army arrives at Mount Tirad, where Goyo devises a delaying strategy that will give Aguinaldo and the rest of the army enough time to escape. Together with Luna's former soldiers, including former Luna Sharpshooter Lieutenant García, fortified trenches are dug on the slope overlooking the mountain pass. On December 2, American troops under Major Peyton C. March arrive. The Battle of Tirad Pass begins and the Americans are initially unable to penetrate the Filipino defenses. With help from a local guide, the Americans use a secret path to outflank the Filipinos. Having just overcome the PTSD he developed in earlier battles, a rejuvenated Goyo attempts to turn the tide of the battle but is suddenly shot dead by an American sniper. Learning of Goyo's death, the Filipinos' morale breaks down and they are easily overwhelmed. Joven and García's son Kiko flee but Joven falls off a cliff after encountering an American soldier. In the aftermath of the battle, the Americans strip Goyo's corpse for war trophies. Goyo is then buried on the site which is soon visited Vicente and Lieutenant Telesforo Carrasco, who both survived the battle, and Felicidad, Goyo's former lover and Aguinaldo's younger sister.

Two years after the battle, Aguinaldo is captured by the Americans in Palanan, effectively ending the war. Held as a prisoner of war in Malacañang Palace, Aguinaldo is visited by his former aide-de-camp Manuel L. Quezon, who has surrendered to the Americans on the orders of his commander, General Tomás Mascardo. Quezon consults Aguinaldo whether Mascardo should surrender, to which Aguinaldo replies that it is up to Mascardo to decide. Meanwhile, Mabini is also captured by the Americans and exiled to Guam where he writes down his own narrative of the war, La Revolución Filipina ('The Philippine Revolution') which notes Aguinaldo's failure as leader of the Philippines.

In a mid-credits scene, Joven is rescued by Kiko and Eduardo Rusca, Luna's former aide. Decades later, both Aguinaldo and Quezon run for president in the 1935 election, while an older Rusca and Joven give a dismayed Aguinaldo a mocking salute.

== Cast ==
- Paulo Avelino as General Gregorio del Pilar
- Carlo Aquino as Colonel Vicente Enríquez
- Arron Villaflor as Joven Hernándo
  - Cris Villanueva as the older Joven Hernándo (1935)
- Mon Confiado as President Emilio Aguinaldo
- Epy Quizon as Apolinario Mabini
- Alvin Anson as General José Alejandrino
- Gwen Zamora as Remedios Nable José
- Empress Schuck as Felicidad Aguinaldo
- Che Ramos-Cosio as Hilaria Aguinaldo
- Rafa Siguion-Reyna as Colonel Julián del Pilar
- Art Acuña as Major Manuel Bernal
- Tomas Santos as Angelito
- Robert Seña as Don Mariano Nable José
- Ronnie Lazaro as Lieutenant Pantaleon García
- Jojit Lorenzo as Miguel Laureáno
- Matt Evans as Lieutenant Telesforo Carrasco
- Benjamin Alves as Lieutenant Manuel L. Quezon
  - TJ Trinidad as the older Manuel L. Quezon (1935)
- Roeder Camañag as Major Evaristo Ortíz
- E. A. Rocha as General Elwell Otis
- Miguel Faustmann as General Arthur MacArthur
- Leo Martinez as Pedro Paterno
- Nonie Buencamino as Felipe Buencamino Sr.
- Perla Bautista as Doña Trinidad Aguinaldo
- Archie Alemania as Eduardo Rusca

Other members of the ensemble cast include Christopher Aronson, RK Bagatsing, Carlo Cruz, Jason Dewey, Bret Jackson, Ethan Salvador, Lorenz Martinez, Karl Medina, Jun Sabayton, Stephanie Sol, Markki Stroem, and Cedrick Juan.

== Production ==
Plans for a sequel to Jerrold Tarog's Heneral Luna went underway after its critical and commercial success. Tarog envisioned the sequel as being about Gregorio del Pilar, a young General who, like Heneral Luna's titular protagonist Antonio Luna, was among the Filipino historical figures during the Philippine–American War. Accordingly, Paulo Avelino, who played Del Pilar in Luna, came aboard to reprise his role.

Tarog's research for Goyo involved studying biographies authored by Teodoro Kalaw as well as crossing the Tirad Pass. Tarog again incorporated several prominent Filipino figures including the likes of Apolinario Mabini and Emilio Aguinaldo, aiming for a scope larger than what was present in Heneral Luna. Tarog co-wrote the film's screenplay with Rody Vera, who has said he had thoroughly studied Luna "to understand the flow of the conversations and other details unique to each character".

Goyo entered pre-production in January 2017. To prepare his scenes, Avelino underwent horseback riding lessons in March 2017. Tarog projected a 50-day film shoot, which began in May 2017. The complete ensemble cast was also revealed in a photo taken during the May shoot, including the likes of Mon Confiado as Emilio Aguinaldo, Epy Quizon as Apolinario Mabini, Benjamin Alves as Manuel L. Quezon, Leo Martinez as Pedro Paterno, and Alvin Anson as José Alejandrino, reprising their roles from Heneral Luna.

Filming was completed on November 27, 2017, lasting 60 days. The production cost for the film is said to be triple the budget of Luna. Location shoots were held in Tarlac, Bataan, Batangas and the Ilocos, while Mount Balagbag in Rizal was used as a stand-in for the Battle of Tirad Pass as the original battle site presented a logistical challenge for the producers. The production crew also built a movie set of a town plaza at the Tarlac Recreational Park.

Filipino folk rock band Ben&Ben was tapped to record the theme song entitled "Susi" (lit. 'Key').

== Release ==
On February 15, 2017, a 20-minute short film entitled Angelito was exclusively released during the theatrical premiere of I'm Drunk, I Love You to serve as a prelude to Goyo and to intertwine both the sequel and Heneral Luna. The film's teaser trailer was released on September 9, 2017. In May 2018, it was announced that the film would be released on September 5, 2018.

The film was made available on DVD on December 16, 2018. It also began streaming on Netflix starting January 26, 2019.

Since May 16, 2024, the film has been available for streaming on YouTube.

== Reception ==
=== Critical reception ===
On the review aggregator website Rotten Tomatoes, 40% of 5 critics' reviews are positive, with an average rating of 2.80/10.

The film received praise for its acting, cinematography, music, and set design, which Zach Yonzon in Spot.PH highlighted as "some of the best in Philippine cinema". Yonzon also gave it a score of 3 out of 5, considering Goyo to be "masterfully done" though somewhat preposterously made. Writing for the Philippine edition of Esquire, Miguel Escobar called the film captivating: "It's a slow burn through the first half, but it's never boring and always beautiful." Fred Hawson of ABS-CBN News called it "subdued but powerful" and gave a score of 9 out of 10.

=== Accolades ===
List of accolades
Award / Film Festival	Category	Recipient(s) and Nominee(s)	Result	Ref.
2019 Entertainment Editors' Choice Awards (The EDDYS)	Best Picture	Goyo	Nominated	
2019 Entertainment Editors' Choice Awards (The EDDYS)	Best Director	Jerrold Tarrog	Nominated	
2019 Entertainment Editors' Choice Awards (The EDDYS)	Best Screenplay	Jerrold Tarog and Rody Vera	Nominated	
2019 Entertainment Editors' Choice Awards (The EDDYS)	Best Cinematography	Pong Ignacio	Nominated	
2019 Entertainment Editors' Choice Awards (The EDDYS)	Best Visual Effects	Blackburst, Inc.	Nominated	
2019 Entertainment Editors' Choice Awards (The EDDYS)	Best Musical Scoring	Jerrold Tarog	Nominated	
2019 Entertainment Editors' Choice Awards (The EDDYS)	Best Production Design	Roy Lachica	Won	
2019 Entertainment Editors' Choice Awards (The EDDYS)	Best Editing	Jerrold Tarog	Nominated	
2019 Entertainment Editors' Choice Awards (The EDDYS)	Best Original Theme Song	Susi by Ben&Ben	Nominated	
37th Luna Awards	Best Picture	Goyo	Won	

== Sequel ==
It was reported that the sequel to Goyo would be about President Manuel L. Quezon, with Benjamin Alves and TJ Trinidad set to reprise their roles as younger and older versions of Quezon respectively. However, director Jerrold Tarog's work on the sequel was postponed after Star Cinema hired him in 2018 to direct Darna. While Tarog focused on filming for Darna, producer EA Rocha stated that pre-production work on the potential Quezon film would continue.

In 2021, Tarrog teased the potential script co-written with Rody Vera on Twitter, stating that it was still to be submitted for approval. In early 2024, it was revealed that film was still waiting for greenlight approval. The project would later receive a "large budget production fund" support from the Film Development Council of the Philippines as part of its CreatePHFilms Funding Program Cycle 1 of 2024.

In 2025, TBA Studios confirmed that the filming of Quezon will commence in March of the same year, with Mon Confiado reprising his role as Aguinaldo. It was revealed that Jericho Rosales will be portraying Quezon in the movie after TJ Trinidad retired from acting.

Quezon was released on October 15, 2025.

== See also ==
- Sakay (1993)
- Tirad Pass: The Last Stand of Gen. Gregorio del Pilar (1996)
- José Rizal (1998)
- Amigo (2010)
- El Presidente (2012)
- Katipunan (2013)
- Bonifacio: Ang Unang Pangulo (2014)
