= Nini Quezon-Avanceña =

- Born: 9 April 1921
- Died: 12 July 2021 (aged 100)
- Parents: Manuel Quezon (father); Aurora Quezon (mother)

Maria Zenaida A. Quezon-Avanceña (9 April 1921 - 12 July 2021), often referred as Nini Quezon which was her childhood nickname, was a Filipino civic leader and human rights advocate known for co-founding the Concerned Women of the Philippines and the Citizens Organization for Political Detainees and working with the advocacy group Kilusan sa Kapangyarihan at Kasarinlan ng Bayan (Kaakbay) and the Philippine Union for Human Rights and the Ecumenical Commission for Displaced Families and Communities during the dictatorship of Ferdinand Marcos, for lobbying for women's rights provisions in the 1987 Philippine Constitution, and serving in the Presidential Commission on Human Rights after the 1986 People Power revolution.

She was also the last surviving child of former Philippine Presidend Manuel Quezon and his wife Aurora Quezon.

== See also ==
- Aurora Quezon
- Manolo Quezon
