= Aurora Quezon =

First Lady of the Philippines from 1935 to 1944

Aurora Aragon Quezon
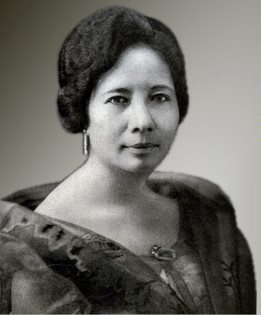
- Quezon in 1939

Chairwoman of the Philippine Red Cross
- In office April 15, 1947 – April 28, 1949

First Lady of the Philippines
- In role November 15, 1935 – August 1, 1944
- President: Manuel L. Quezon
- Preceded by: Hilaria Aguinaldo
- Succeeded by: Pacencia Laurel

Personal details
- Born: Aurora Antonia Aragón y Molina; February 19, 1888 Baler, El Príncipe, Nueva Écija, Captaincy General of the Philippines (now Baler, Aurora, Philippines)
- Died: April 28, 1949 (aged 61) Bongabon, Nueva Ecija, Philippines
- Cause of death: Assassination
- Resting place: Quezon Memorial Shrine, Quezon City, Philippines
- Spouse: Manuel Luis Quezon y Molina (m. 1918; died 1944)
- Children: 4

Aurora Antonia Aragon Quezon (born Aurora Antonia Aragón y Molina; February 19, 1888 – April 28, 1949) was the wife of Philippine President Manuel Luis Quezon and the First Lady of the Philippines from 1935 to 1944. Although she is recognized as the second First Lady of the Philippines, she was actually the first spouse of a Philippine president to be addressed as such, the honorific being unknown in the Philippines prior to Manuel Quezon's presidency. Much beloved by Filipinos, Quezon was known for involvement with humanitarian activities and served as the first chairperson of the Philippine National Red Cross.

Five years after her husband's death, she and her daughter María Aurora ("Baby") were assassinated while they were en route to Baler to open a hospital dedicated to President Quezon. The province of Aurora was named in her memory.

== Early life ==
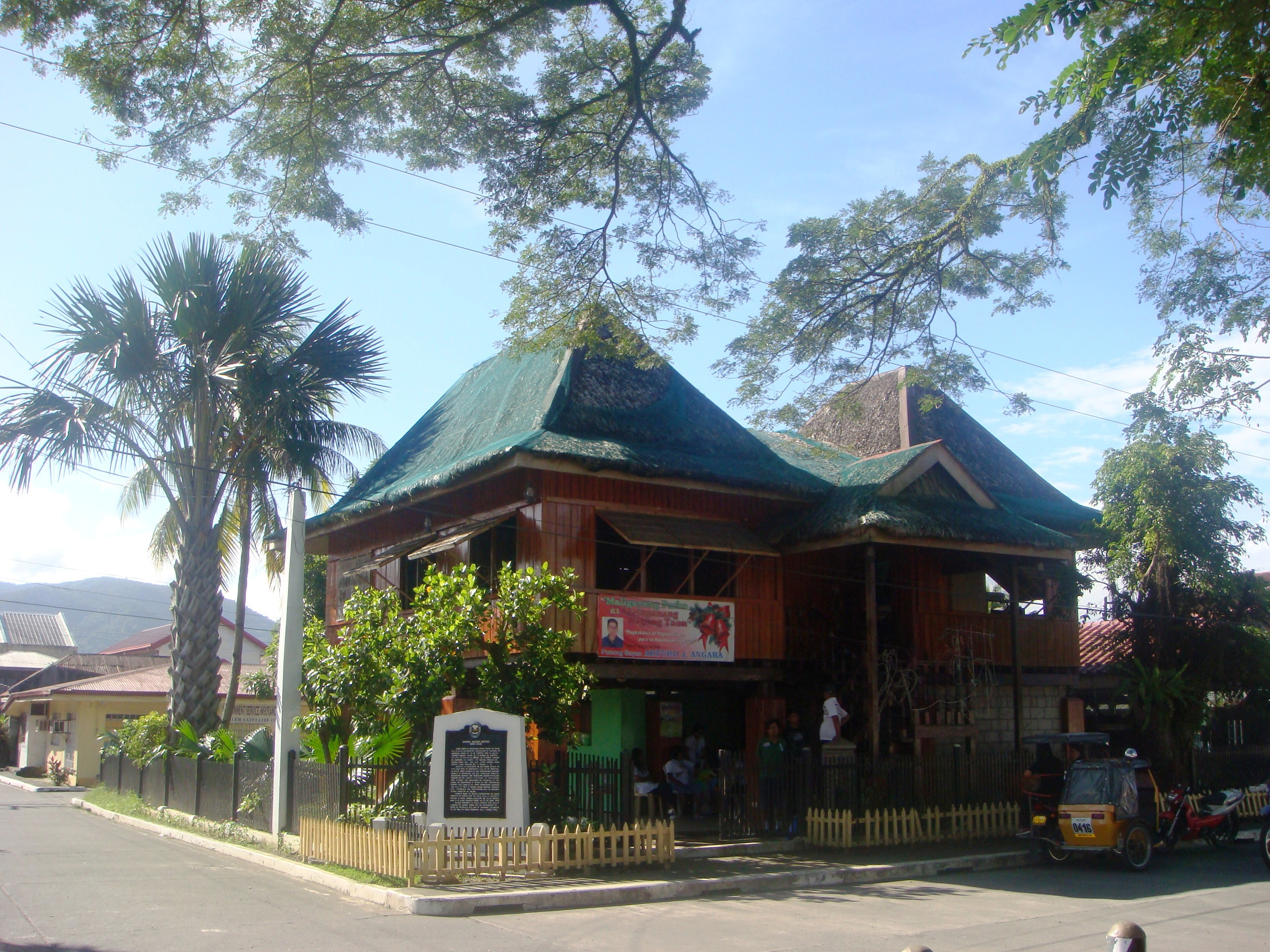
Doña Aurora Aragon-Quezon replica house in Poblacion, Baler, Aurora, owned by her father Pedro Aragón

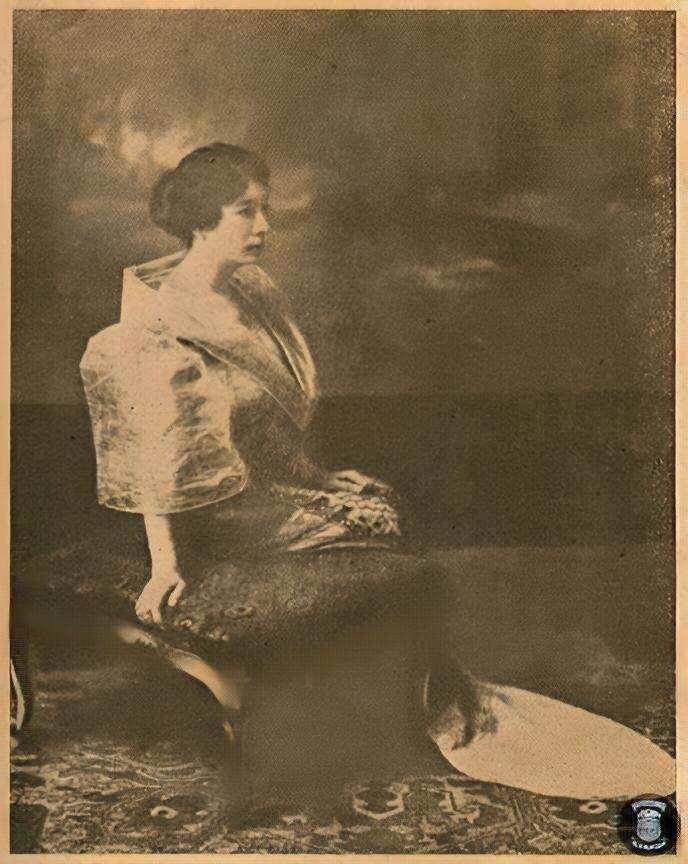
Young Aurora

Aurora Aragón was born on February 19, 1888, to Pedro Aragón and Zenaida Molina in the town of Baler, then in the District of El Príncipe, a part of the province of Nueva Ecija. Her mother was a Filipina mestiza born to a Spanish priest, Father Jose Urbina de Esparragosa, who arrived in Baler from Esparragosa de la Serena, Cáceres Province, Spain in 1847 serving as the town's parish priest. Her father is a native of Laguna. She is the youngest of the 4 sisters, her older sisters are Maria, called by her siblings Kaka Malaki, Emilia, referred to Kaka Munti, and Amparo, referred to as Kaka Nanis. During the Philippine Revolution, her father was imprisoned by the colonial authorities for being suspected as being a member of the Katipunan; he would die in captivity. Among her tutors during her youth was her mother's sister (aunt), María Dolores Molina, who was the mother of her first cousin and future husband Manuel Luis Quezon. After her father's imprisonment, she was taken in by her aunt María Dolores and uncle Lucio, and she lived for a time under the same roof as her future spouse. After Manuel's own parents had died, he would stay with the Aragón family whenever he was in Baler.

After Pedro Aragón's death, his survivors, including daughter Aurora, had been cast into extreme poverty, surviving on subsistence farming. This experience was said to have shaped young Aurora's lifelong attitude of according equal treatment to everybody, no matter their status in life. The Aragón family later moved to Lucena where Manuel was then serving as the provincial fiscal of Tayabas. Aurora, who had wanted to become a school teacher, enrolled at the Philippine Normal College in Manila at the expense of her future husband, but had to stop her studies after two years due to her poor health.

== Marriage and family ==
In 1907, Manuel Luis Quezon was elected to the Philippine Assembly. By 1916, he was elected to the Philippine Senate and as that chamber's president. Aurora often visited Manuel in Manila and joined him when he led the first Philippine Independence Mission to the United States. They were married through a civil wedding ceremony on December 14, 1918, followed by a religious wedding three days later, both in Hong Kong.

They had four children: María Aurora "Baby" (September 23, 1919 – April 28, 1949); María Zenaida "Nini" (April 9, 1921 – July 12, 2021); Luisa Corazón Paz (February 17, 1924 – December 14, 1924); and Manuel Lucio Jr. "Nonong" (June 23, 1926 – September 18, 1998). Luisa would die in infancy.

The marriage lasted until Manuel's death in 1944. It withstood despite his reputation as a libertine; the author Stanley Karnow described Aurora Quezon as finding "solace in prayer and the Philippine law against divorce". Still, Aurora has also been described as "a devoted wife and a strict but understanding mother". Quezon himself publicly extolled his wife as "my friend, companion and partner".

== Political wife and First Lady ==
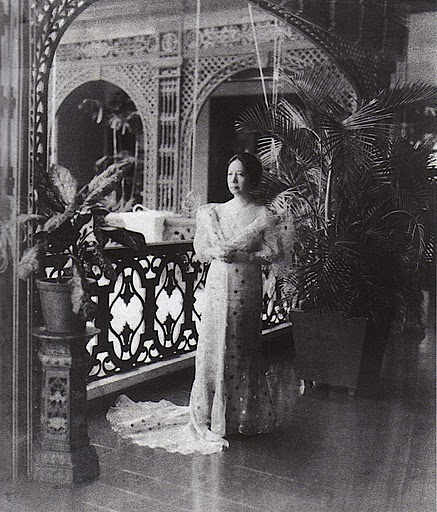
Aurora Quezon in Malacañan Palace

Within the first seventeen years of the marriage, Manuel Quezon emerged as a dominant figure in Philippine politics. His career reached its apex in 1935, when he was elected President of the Commonwealth of the Philippines. During her husband's political life, Aurora stayed in the background, involving herself with women's organizations such as the National Federation of Women's Clubs, of which she was the honorary chairperson.

Time described Aurora as "dignified and portly". The Quezons were the first presidential couple to reside in Malacañan Palace, but she spent as little time as possible there, preferring to stay in a "nipa house" in Malacañang Park or in her farm, Kaleidan, in Arayat, Pampanga. She nevertheless was an active First Lady, engaging herself in the campaign to give Filipino women the right of suffrage, which was achieved in 1937. She was particularly involved in managing the family's Arayat farm to demonstrate how social justice could be applied to landlord-tenant relationships in an agrarian setting. She was involved in the Girl Scouts of the Philippines and the Associación de Damas Filipinas, a noted orphanage in Manila. She was also the honorary president of another orphanage, the White Cross, located in San Juan.

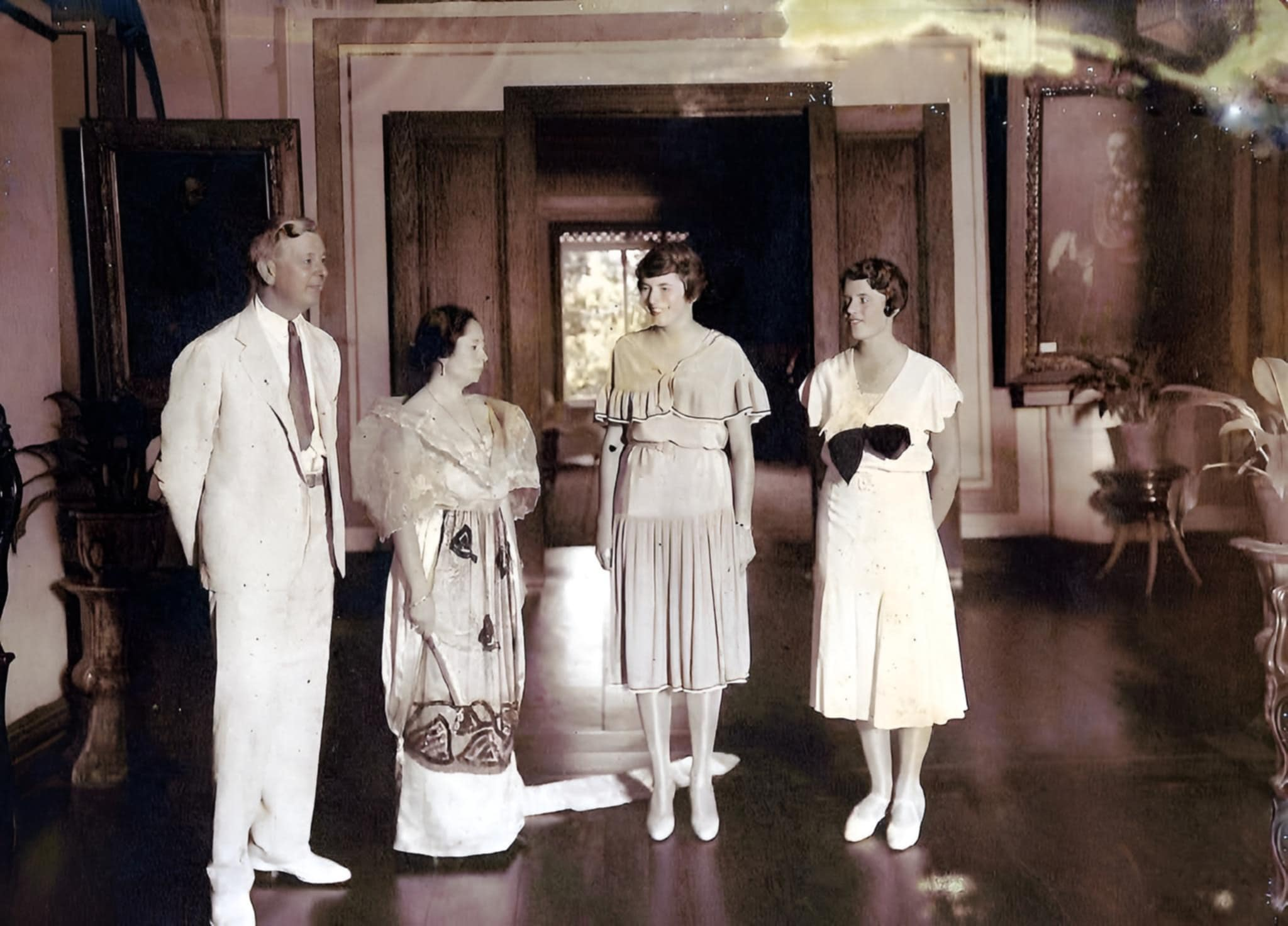
Aurora in Malacañang Palace with Dwight F. Davis and his two daughters.

President Quezon was re-elected in November 1941, but his presidency was immediately beset with crisis when Japan invaded the Philippines in the following month. Aurora accompanied her husband to Corregidor in December 1941, where the President was sworn in by Chief Justice José Abad Santos for his second term on December 30, 1941. For the next two months, the Quezon family remained in Corregidor where, despite the difficult living conditions, Aurora was said to have maintained her poise and kept up with a daily mass. In February 1942, they began their long journey via Australia to escape the Japanese and establish the Government in exile of the Commonwealth of the Philippines, finally reaching the United States in June 1942.

While in exile, Aurora devoted her time to the care of her ailing husband, who died in Saranac, New York, from tuberculosis on August 1, 1944. She then moved to California to await their return to the Philippines. She and her daughters volunteered as nurses for the Red Cross.

== Postwar activity ==
When Aurora Quezon returned to the Philippines, she was voted a pension of ₱1,000 (equivalent to ₱64,677 in 2021) a month by the Philippine Congress. She returned the check, explaining: "I feel that on account of ... countless war widows and orphans ... I should waive collection of a pension . . . I cannot, in good conscience, receive ... Government assistance when so many of my less fortunate sisters and their children are not yet taken care of. . . I know [if I accepted] I would not be keeping faith with the memory of my beloved husband. . . ." This act, it was said, "demonstrated why thousands of Filipinos regard her as a combination queen-mother and patron saint". Quezon was offered a slot in the Liberal Party senatorial slate for the 1946 elections, which she declined. She, however, endorsed the presidential candidacy of Liberal bet Manuel Roxas, who defeated her husband's vice-president and successor, Sergio Osmeña, to win the presidency.

In 1947, with the active support of Quezon, the Philippine National Red Cross was established as an independent Red Cross organization. She became the first Chairperson of the Philippine National Red Cross, holding the position until her death. She also was named as honorary vice-president of the Philippine Tuberculosis Society.

She continued to be involved in civic work, such as the efforts to rebuild the Antipolo Church. She received honorary doctorates from the University of Santo Tomas, and from the University of Michigan at Ann Arbor. She was likewise bestowed the Ozanam Award from the Ateneo de Manila University, and the Pro Ecclessia et Pontifice Cross from Pope Pius XII.

== Assassination and aftermath ==
On the morning of April 28, 1949, Quezon left her home to travel to her husband's hometown of Baler to open the Quezon Memorial Hospital. She had been cautioned about this trip beforehand due to the frequent insurgency activities in Central Luzon of the Hukbalahap, the military arm of the Communist Party of the Philippines. She shrugged off the threat, remarking on the morning of the trip, "[Hukbalahap supremo] Taruc knows my white hair and he will not hurt me." Nonetheless, a convoy of thirteen vehicles, including two military jeeps full of armed soldiers, accompanied Quezon. Together with Quezon in her Buick sedan were her daughter "Baby", then a law student at the University of Santo Tomas, her son-in-law Felipe "Philip" Buencamino (husband of "Nini"), Quezon City mayor Ponciano Bernardo and retired Armed Forces Chief of Staff Major General Rafael Jalandoni.

They traveled along the Baler–Bongabon Road connecting Baler with Nueva Ecija, which Quezon had herself inaugurated in 1940. At Quezon's request, her vehicle led the caravan, and it soon sped away from the military jeep immediately behind it. As Quezon's vehicle traversed the mountain road, it was blocked by a group of armed men. The men ignored the protestations from General Jalandoni and Mayor Bernardo that Quezon was in the vehicle, and machine-gun fire erupted from the side of the road and from the mountain slopes. It was later estimated that between 100 and 200 armed men had participated in the attack. Mrs. Quezon, her daughter, and Bernardo were killed instantly, while her son-in-law was mortally wounded. The soldiers in the convoy soon arrived at the scene and exchanged fire with the assailants, who were able to seize the valuables of the victims before fleeing the scene. In all, twelve members of the Quezon party and ten of the assailants were killed.

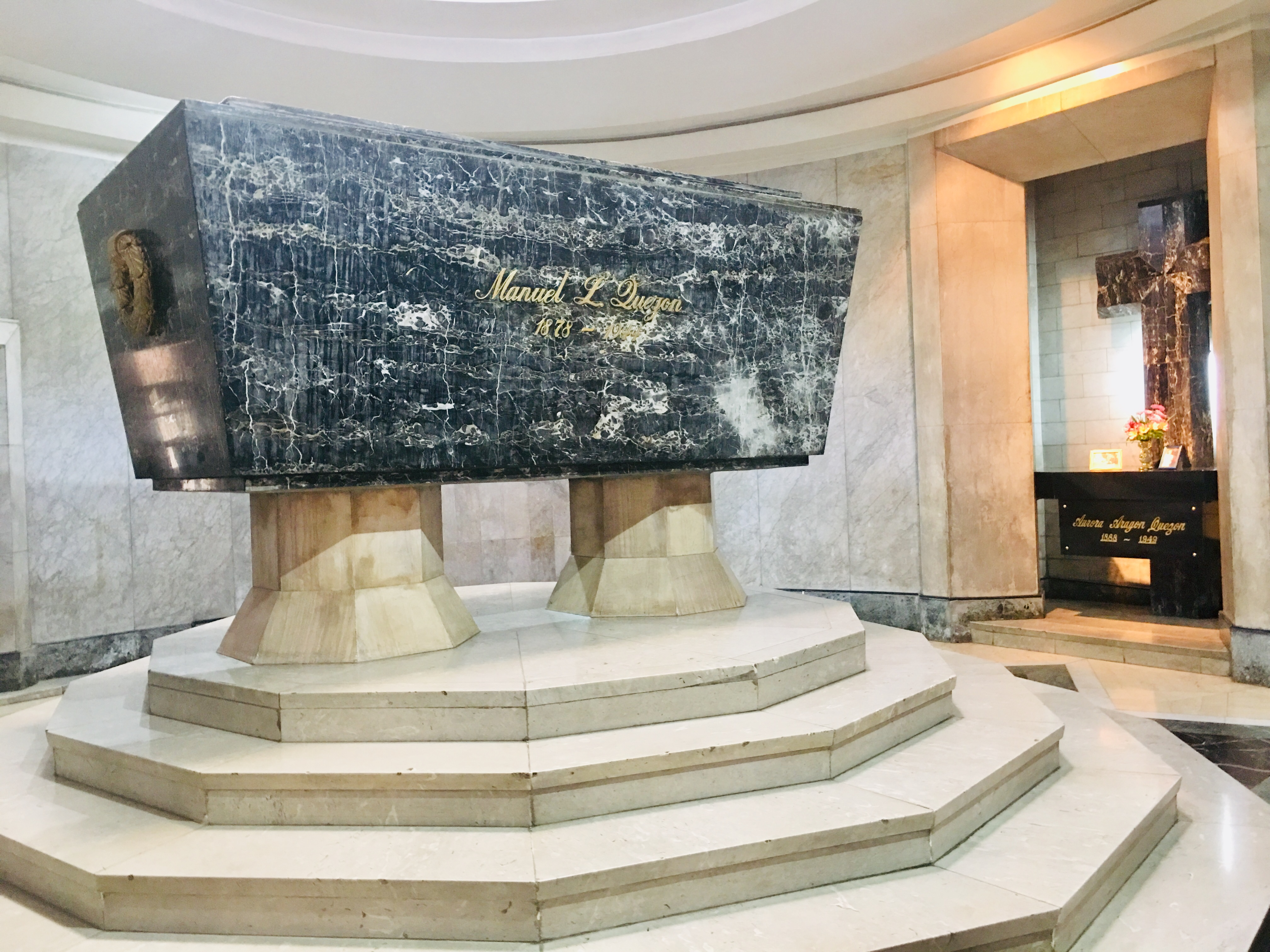
Tomb of President Manuel Quezon and his wife Aurora at Museo ni Quezon, Quezon Memorial Circle, Quezon City

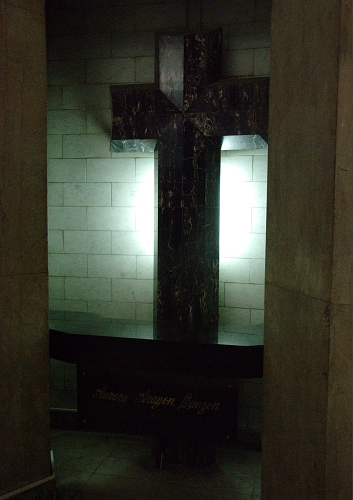
Aurora Quezon is buried a few meters away from her husband inside the Quezon Memorial Shrine in Quezon City.

There was national and international condemnation of the massacre. United States President Harry Truman was shocked and simply declared, "It was awful." Nine days of national mourning were declared, and President Elpidio Quirino openly wept during the funeral. Quezon was buried at Manila North Cemetery. The mourners included her two surviving children, Manuel Jr. and Nini, who herself was widowed by the massacre. While no Philippine president has ever been assassinated, Aurora Quezon is one of three presidential spouses to have been murdered (the other two were Alicia Syquia-Quirino and Senator Benigno Aquino Jr., both of whom were killed before their spouses became presidents.)

It was widely believed that the Hukbalahap was responsible for the killings. In preparation of the attack, the insurgents had blockaded the road and rounded up passengers from passing vehicles, and one of those passengers claimed seeing a former employee of his who had joined the Huk as among the armed men. While General Jalandoni, who survived the attack, tagged the Huks as responsible, the chief of the Philippine Constabulary laid blame instead on bandits. President Quirino blamed the Huks and responded by calling for "a people's war on the dissidents".

Luis Taruc, supremo of the Hukbalahap, denied that his group was responsible for the crime, though he also claimed that the Huk were conducting an investigation of their own if one of the group had breached ranks and participated in the killing. Nonetheless, after Taruc's surrender in 1954, he was formally charged for the murder of Quezon and other members of her party; these charges would be dropped before they could be heard on trial. Throughout the 1950s, several other captured Huk members would be charged for participation in the assassination, with five of them being sentenced to death by a Cabanatuan trial court. Luis Taruc later wrote the killings were discussed as an agenda item at the December 1949 to January 1950 Politburo meeting, "the accidental killing in a Huk ambush of Mrs. Quezon, widow of the late President Quezon, and her daughter. The majority took a characteristic Communist attitude toward this deplorable event. The victims had been 'class enemies', and that settled everything."

On April 28, 2005, exactly fifty-six years after her death, the remains of Quezon were exhumed and transferred from Manila North Cemetery to a black, stone crypt beside her husband's sarcophagus under the Quezon Memorial Shrine in Quezon City. The reinterment rites were attended by President Gloria Macapagal Arroyo and the Quezons' sole surviving child, Zenaida "Nini" Quezon-Avanceña.

== Legacy ==
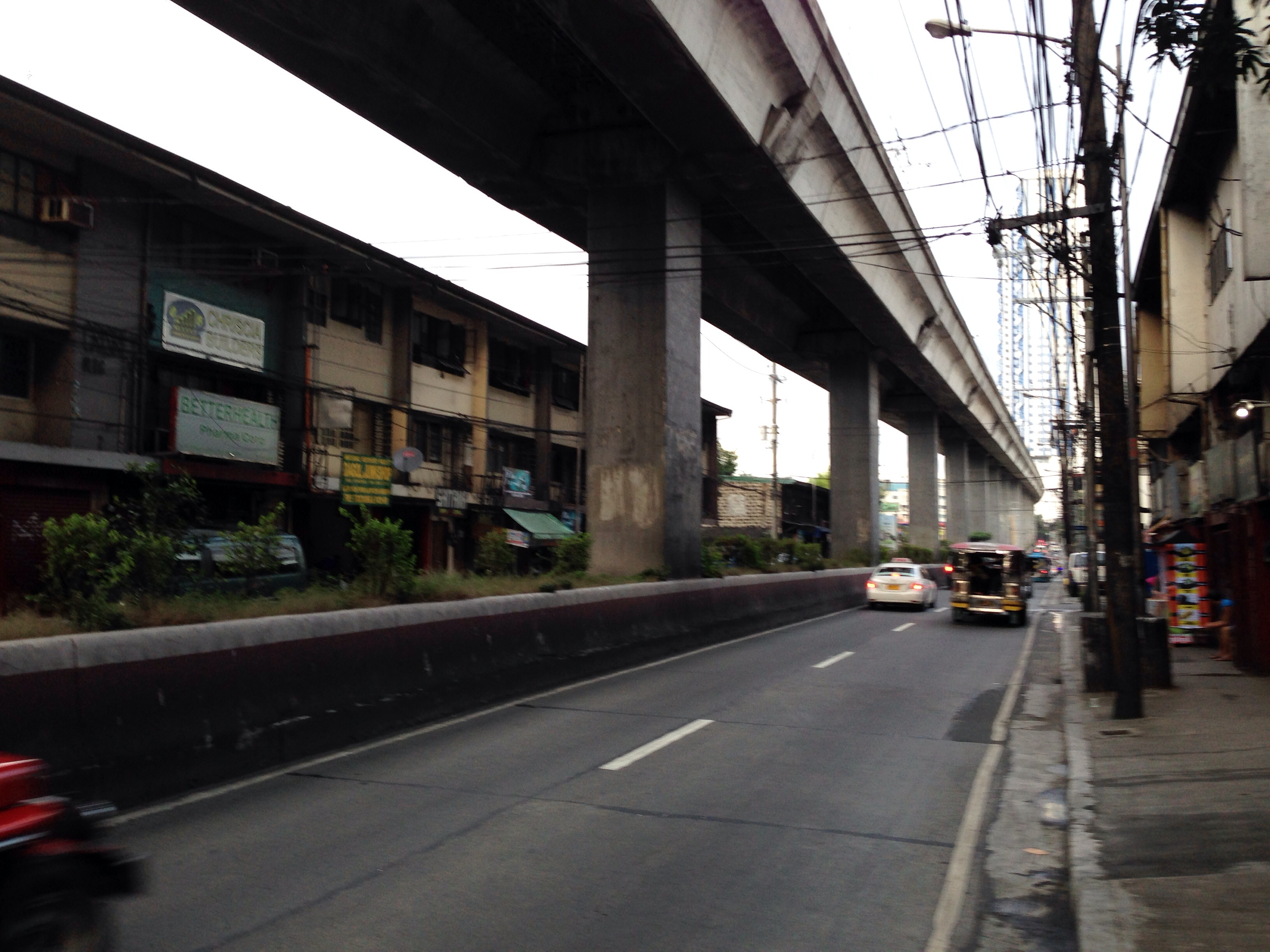
Aurora Boulevard

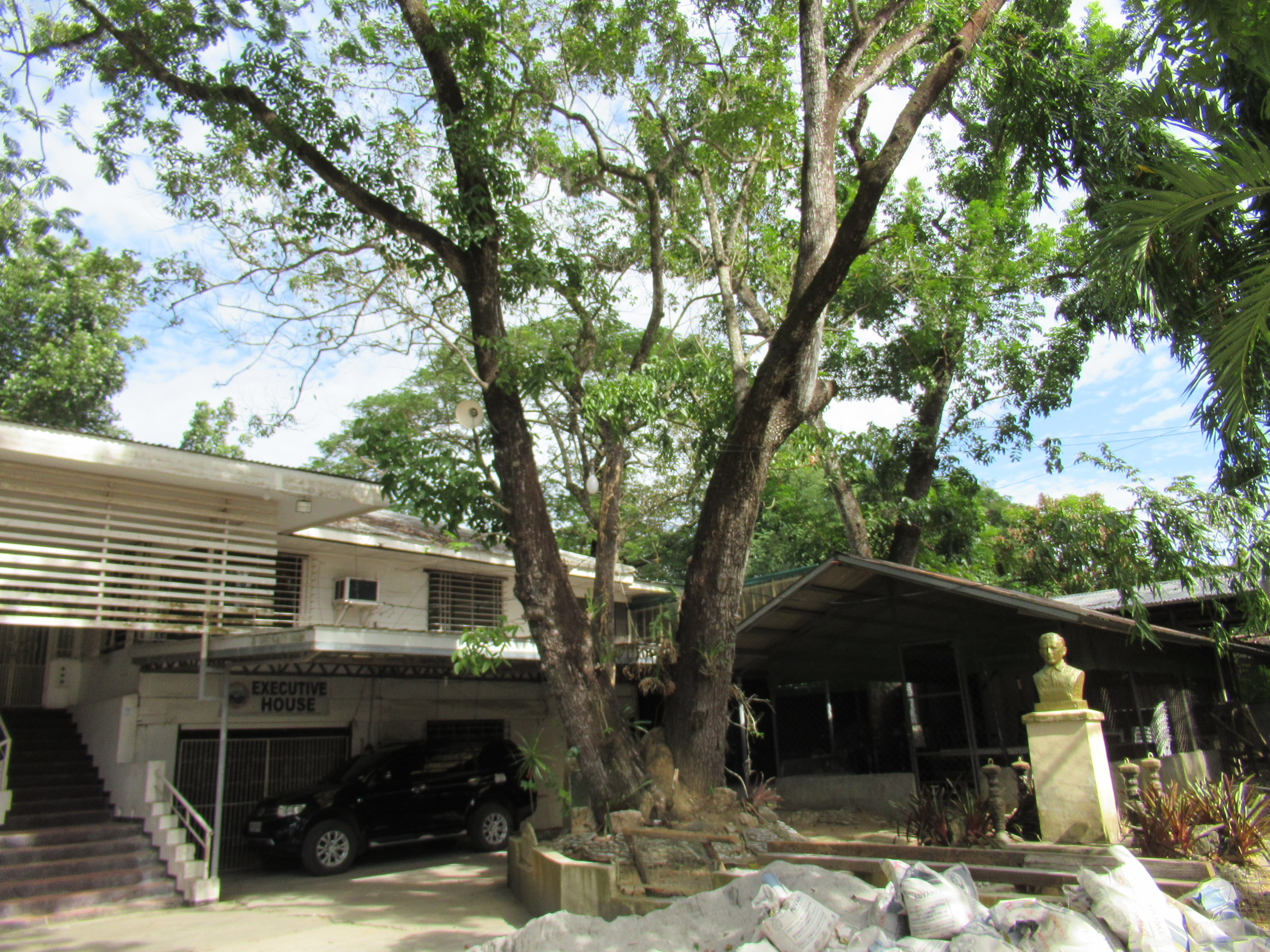
Doña Aurora Tree (Swietenia mahagoni) planted by her at Bulacan Agricultural State College.

In 1951, Elpidio Quirino created the Aurora sub-province, named in her honor, comprising Baler and surrounding areas in the adjacent Quezon Province. A road that connects Manila and Quezon City via San Juan (then part of Rizal Province) was renamed Aurora Boulevard in her honor in 1963. In 1979, Aurora became a separate province. Manuel and Aurora Quezon are the only spouses to have respective provinces in the Philippines named after them. The first major building erected on Aurora Boulevard (also called Aurora Avenue), that is, the Aurora Tower at the Araneta Center in Cubao, was named after her. Her foremost legacy in the field of education was Mount Carmel College of Baler (formerly called Mount Carmel High School), a Catholic mission school founded in 1948 by American Carmelite missionaries who came to this town upon her invitation. The Concerned Women of the Philippines named the Aurora Aragon Quezon Peace Awards after her in 1988. The award was called the Human Rights Award in 1981, and winners included the Free Legal Assistance Group, the Agrava Commission, Jose W. Diokno, Claudio O. Teehankee, the MABINI law firm, and Cecilia Muñoz-Palma, but it was changed to focus on peace in 1988. Aurora A. Quezon Elementary School in Malate, Manila and in Quezon City are also named for her, as well as the municipality of Aurora in Zamboanga del Sur. According to folktales, Doña Aurora Quezon wished to have a flower entitled to her, thus the 'Doña Aurora' (Mussaenda philippica) flower.

- Aurora Quezon Day (19 February) – Celebrated throughout the provinces of Quezon and Aurora, and Lucena where it is a non-working holiday.
- Through Presidential Proclamation 687, September 23, 2024 was declared a special non-working day In Maria Aurora, Aurora to celebrate the birth anniversary of her daughter, María Aurora "Baby" (September 23, 1919 – April 28, 1949) Quezon.

== In popular culture ==
- Portrayed by Rachel Alejandro in the film Quezon's Game (2019).
- Portrayed by Karylle in the film Quezon (2025), the third instalment of the Bayaniverse trilogy.

== Notes ==
Honorary titles
Vacant Title last held by Hilaria Aguinaldo	First Lady of the Philippines; 1935–1944	Succeeded by Pacencia Laurel
