= Mon Confiado =

Filipino actor (born 1968)

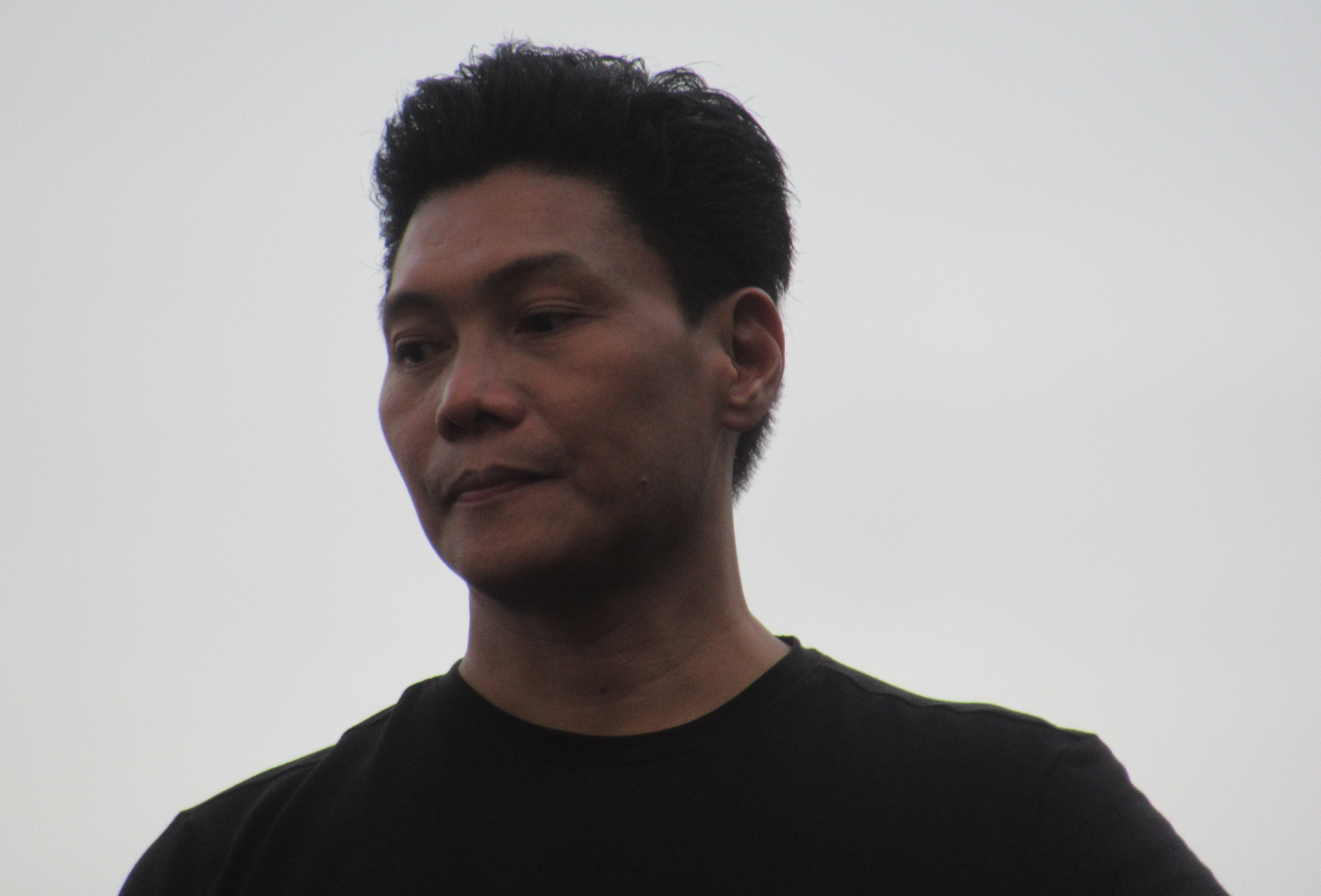
- Confiado in 2022
- Born: Ramon Veroy Confiado; March 19, 1968 (age 58); Sampaloc, Manila, Philippines
- Other names: Ramon, Mon, Monching
- Occupations: Actor, businessman
- Years active: 1992–present
- Agent: Freelancer
- Parent: Ángel Confiado (father)

Ramon "Mon" Veroy Confiado (born March 19, 1968) is a Filipino freelance, character and theater actor and businessman who has appeared in both mainstream and independent films. He is the son of late veteran actor Ángel Confiado from a second family.

Confiado graduated with a degree in Civil Engineering at the Mapúa Institute of Technology. He practices method acting and has also starred in a handful of international films. Having started his acting career in the early 1990s, Confiado has been nominated and won numerous acting awards both internationally and locally.

He is best known for playing Emilio Aguinaldo in the movies Heneral Luna, Goyo: The Boy General and Quezon. He is recently known for his role as Gov. William Acosta, one of the main antagonists in the 2023 hit series Senior High, and its sequel, High Street. Another portrayal of the main antagonist role of Dr. Franco Terra is in the 2024 GMA Drama afternoon series Makiling.

In August 2024, Confiado filed a Cybercrime Prevention Act of 2012 complaint against a content creator who made a copypasta that depicted Confiado stealing fifteen Milky Way bars from a grocery store.

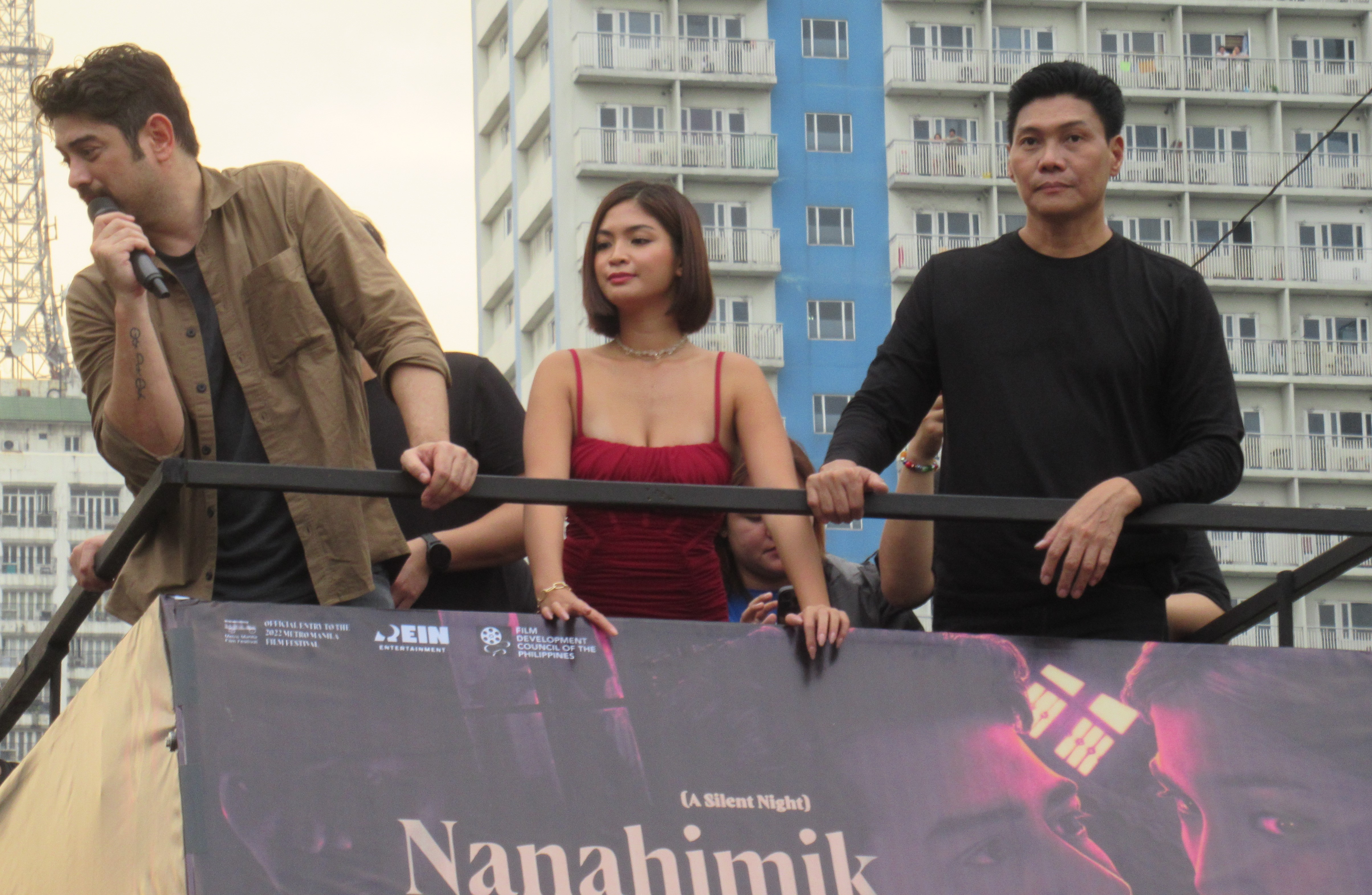
Confiado Nanahimik ang Gabi float

== Filmography ==
=== Film ===
Key
†	Denotes films that have not yet been released

Year	Title	Role	References
TBA	The Rapists of Pepsi Paloma †	Dr. Rey dela Cruz	
2025	Quezon	President Emilio Aguinaldo	
2025	In Thy Name	Abu Sabaya	
2022	Nanahimik ang Gabi	Soliman	
2021	Katips	Lt. Sales	
2021	The Expat	Cruz	
2020	The Golden Holiday	Police Lieutenant Shawn Martinez	
2020	Stateside	Andrew Santos	
2019	Miracle in Cell No. 7	Choy	
2019	White Knight	Cruz	
2019	Package	Detective Sean	
2019	The Rebel Leader	Isagani	
2018	Double Twisting, Double Back	Raffy (Badger's Coach)	
2018	Tres	(segment: Virgo)	
2018	Alimuom		
2018	Goyo: Ang Batang Heneral	President Emilio Aguinaldo	
2018	Signal Rock	Damian	
2018	Poon	Father Greg	
2018	Hitboy	Himself	
2018	El Peste	Abner	
2017	Ang Guro Kong Hindi Marunong Magbasa	Rebel Commander Ahmid	
2017	The Ghost Bride	Robert	
2017	Mga Gabing Kasinghaba ng Hair Ko	Kuya Roger	
2017	Si Tokhang at ang Tropang Buang	Unknown	
2017	Double Barrel	Gunman	
2017	Bhoy Intsik		
2017	Stateside	Andrew Santos	
2017	Pepeng Kulot		
2016	EJK (Extrajudicial Killing)	SPO1 Bryan Ramirez	
2016	Ma' Rosa	Sanchez	
2016	Teniente Gimo: Ang Aswang Man Ay May Hugot Din		
2015	Mandirigma	Hamda Marawan	
2015	Maria Labo	Policeman	
2015	Iisa	Mao	
2015	Felix Manalo	Leoncio Javier	
2015	Heneral Luna	President Emilio Aguinaldo	
2015	Miss Bulalacao		
2014	Bonifacio: Ang Unang Pangulo	Colonel Agapito Bonzón	
2014	Gemini	Manuel / Anton	
2014	The Trial	Borta	
2013	Boy Golden: Shoot to Kill	Boy Tulo	
2013	Saka Saka	Guido	
2013	The Diplomat Hotel		
2013	Mga Alaala sa Tag-ulan	Brian	
2013	Ang Pirata	Bert	
2013	Dance of the Steel Bars	Gudo	
2012	Shake, Rattle and Roll Fourteen: The Invasion	Lawan (segment: Lost Command)	
2012	Supremo	Macario Sakay	
2012	Just One Summer	Ramon	
2012	The Healing	Gay Lover	
2012	Captive	Abu Omar	
2012	Palitan	Ramiro	
2012	Corazon: Ang Unang Aswang	Berto	
2011	Panday: Ang Ikalawang Yugto	Taumbayan	
2011	Regalo	Alvin	
2009	T2	Domeng	
2008	Paupahan	Popoy	
2008	Sisa	Sakristan Mayor	
2006	Sukob	Van driver	
2005	Mano Po 4: Ako Legal Wife	Condo Sales Agent	
2005	Aishite Imasu 1941: Mahal Kita	Alexander	
2004	Feng Shui	Security guard	
2004	Gagamboy	Snatcher	
2003	Ako, Siya, o Ikaw?	Mico	
2002	Lollipop	Arturo / Art	
2002	Virgin People III	Kumander Dodong	
2000	Deathrow	Lukas	
2000	Yakapin Mo ang Umaga	Jonas	
2000	Anghel dela Guardia	Samuel	
2000	Live Show	Frankie	
2000	Azucena	Policemen	
2000	Tugatog	Marco	
1999	Luksong Tinik	Ado	
1998	Jose Rizal	Mariano Ponce	
1998	Sambahin ang Ngalan Mo	Junior Mascardo	
1998	Legacy	Doorman	
1997	Nasaan ang Puso?	Urban Poor Attorney	
1997	Behind Enemy Lines	Phred	
1997	T.G.I.S.: The Movie	Rescuer	
1997	Bubot, Kulang sa Panahon	Andring	
1997	Sa Kabilugan ng Buwan	Boy Ponjap	
1996	Medrano	Geneva's Husband	
1996	Ama, Ina, Anak	Rolly	
1995	Dahas	The Thief	
1994	Vampira	Snatcher	
1993	Hindi Kita Malilimutan	Simon	
1992	Shake, Rattle & Roll IV	Bestman (segment: Ang Guro)	
1992	Bakit Labis Kitang Mahal	Roel	

=== Television ===
Year	Title	Role
TBA	Sellblock	
2024	High Street	Gov. William Acosta
2024	Makiling	Dr. Franco Terra
2023–2024	Senior High	Gov. William Acosta
2023	The Write One	Ramon dela Peña
2022	Magpakailanman: Insta-Nanay	Kitoy
2022	Maalaala Mo Kaya: Slot Machine	Dennis Ybañez
2022	Maalaala Mo Kaya: Silver Medal	Elmer Pamisa
2021	Legal Wives	Mayor Usman Pabil†
2020	Bawal na Game Show	Himself / Contestant
2020	A Soldier's Heart	Lieutenant Colonel Raul R. Lucente
2019	Imbestigador: Bata sa Sako	Mark 'Macky' Besa
2019	Ipaglaban Mo!: Pagkukulang	Ruben
2019	Maalaala Mo Kaya: Tubig	Nelson
2019	Bagman	PBI Investigator
2019	Jhon En Martian	Pepak
2019	50/50	Edwin
2019	Maalaala Mo Kaya: Black Belt	Ronaldo
2019	Ipaglaban Mo!: Hostage	Darwin
2018	Imbestigador: Testigo	Zandro Ugdamin
2018	Home Sweetie Home: Walang Kapares	Miguel
2018	Maalaala Mo Kaya: Anting-anting	Old Man
2018	Magpakailanman: Ina, Dapat Ba Kitang Patawarin?	Efren
2018	Wish Ko Lang: Tatlong Ama, Iisang Kapalaran	Leo
2018	Maalaala Mo Kaya: Kalabaw	Ka Dante
2018	Wish Ko Lang: Inay, Bakit Mo Kami Pinabayaan?	Jon
2018	Contessa	Armando 'Arman' Wilwayco
2018	Wish Ko Lang: How to be Budang?	Tiyo Ramon
2017	Tadhana: Lihim	Roger
2017	Magpakailanman: My Unlawful Husband	Mario
2017	Eat Bulaga: Jackpot En Poy	Himself / Player
2017	Wish Ko Lang: Kapalaran	Raul
2017	Maynila: Bangungot ng Kahapon (The Carmen "Pards" Raga Story)	Berto
2017	Imbestigador: Nagbigti o Binigti?	
2017	Ipaglaban Mo!: Buybust	Greg
2016	Imbestigador: Cauayan Rape and Double Murder Case	
2016	FPJ's Ang Probinsyano	Cheng Lao
2016	Karelasyon: Raketera	Mr. Tan
2016	Wish Ko Lang: Magkaramay, Magkasalo	Luis
2016	Imbestigador: Rasha Mae	Luis 'Nonoy' Martisano Jr.
2016	Carlo J. Caparas's Ang Panday	Amang
2016	Wish I May	Mr. Chua
2016	Locked Up Abroad: Jungle Terror	
2015	Wattpad Presents: The Ignorant Princess	Tatay Roberto
2015	#ParangNormal Activity	Dr. Reyes
2015	Wish Ko Lang: Si Leo	
2015	Maynila: Happily Ever After	
2015	Wattpad Presents: The Magic in You	Tatay Rod
2015	Baker King	Nando
2015	Wish Ko Lang: Kahon	
2014	Ang Lihim ni Annasandra	Dalik
2014	Confessions of a Torpe	Ramon
2014	Bawat Sandali	SPO1 Kintanar
2013	Cassandra: Warrior Angel	Dado
2012	Walang Hanggan	Brando
2012	Enchanted Garden	Balete
2012	TV5 Mini Serye: Nandito Ako	Pablito
2012	Locked Up Abroad: Busted in Bangkok	
2011	Maynila: Girl Name... Faith	Vic
2011	Amaya	Songil
2011	Locked Up Abroad: Prisoner of Love	
2010	My Driver Sweet Lover	Cyrus delo Tavo
2010	Claudine: Partners	
2010	Elena M. Patron's Momay	Boss Chief Manuel
2010	Midnight DJ: Sinapiang Skateboard	
2009	Jojo A. All the Way!	Himself
2009	Midnight DJ: Halimaw sa Puno ng Saging	
2009	Tayong Dalawa	Brando
2009	Daisy Siete's Cha-cha Muchacha	
2009	New Pangarap Kong Jackpot: Kulto Sagrado	Brother John
2009	Maalaala Mo Kaya: Pedicab	Tonyo
2009	Carlo J. Caparas' Totoy Bato	Turko Manzano
2008	Sine Novela: Gaano Kadalas ang Minsan?	Fredo
2008	Carlo J. Caparas' Joaquin Bordado	Warden Gomez
2008	ESP: Under Cover of Night	
2007	Mga Kuwento ni Lola Basyang: Ang Mahiwagang Balabal	
2007	Asian Treasures	X / Xander
2002-2003	Recuerdo de Amor	Alberto
2000	Pangako Sa 'Yo	Rogelio
2000	Habang May Buhay	
1996	Love Notes	Various
1994–1996	Bisperas Ng Kasaysayan	
1993	Young Love, Sweet Love	Various
1992–1993	Four Da Boys	

== Awards and nominations ==
Year	Award-giving body	Category	Nominated work(s)	Result	Ref.
2008	2008 FAMAS Awards for Movies	Best Supporting Actor	Eddie Romero's Faces of Love (2007)	Won	
2016	32nd PMPC Star Awards for Movies	Movie Supporting Actor of the Year	Heneral Luna (2015)	Nominated	
2017	2017 Young Critics Circle	Best Performance by Male or Female, Adult or Child, Individual or Ensemble in Leading or Supporting Role	Ma' Rosa (2016)	Nominated	
2018	2018 FAMAS Awards for Movies	Best Supporting Actor	Mga Gabing Kasinghaba ng Hair Ko (2017)	Won	
2018	2018 Young Critics Circle	Best Performance by Male or Female, Adult or Child, Individual or Ensemble in Leading or Supporting Role	Mga Gabing Kasinghaba ng Hair Ko (2017)	Nominated	
2018	2018 Sinag Maynila Film Festival	Best Actor	El Peste (2018)	Nominated	
