= Centennial Tunnel (Aringay) =

Abandoned railway tunnel in La Union, Philippines

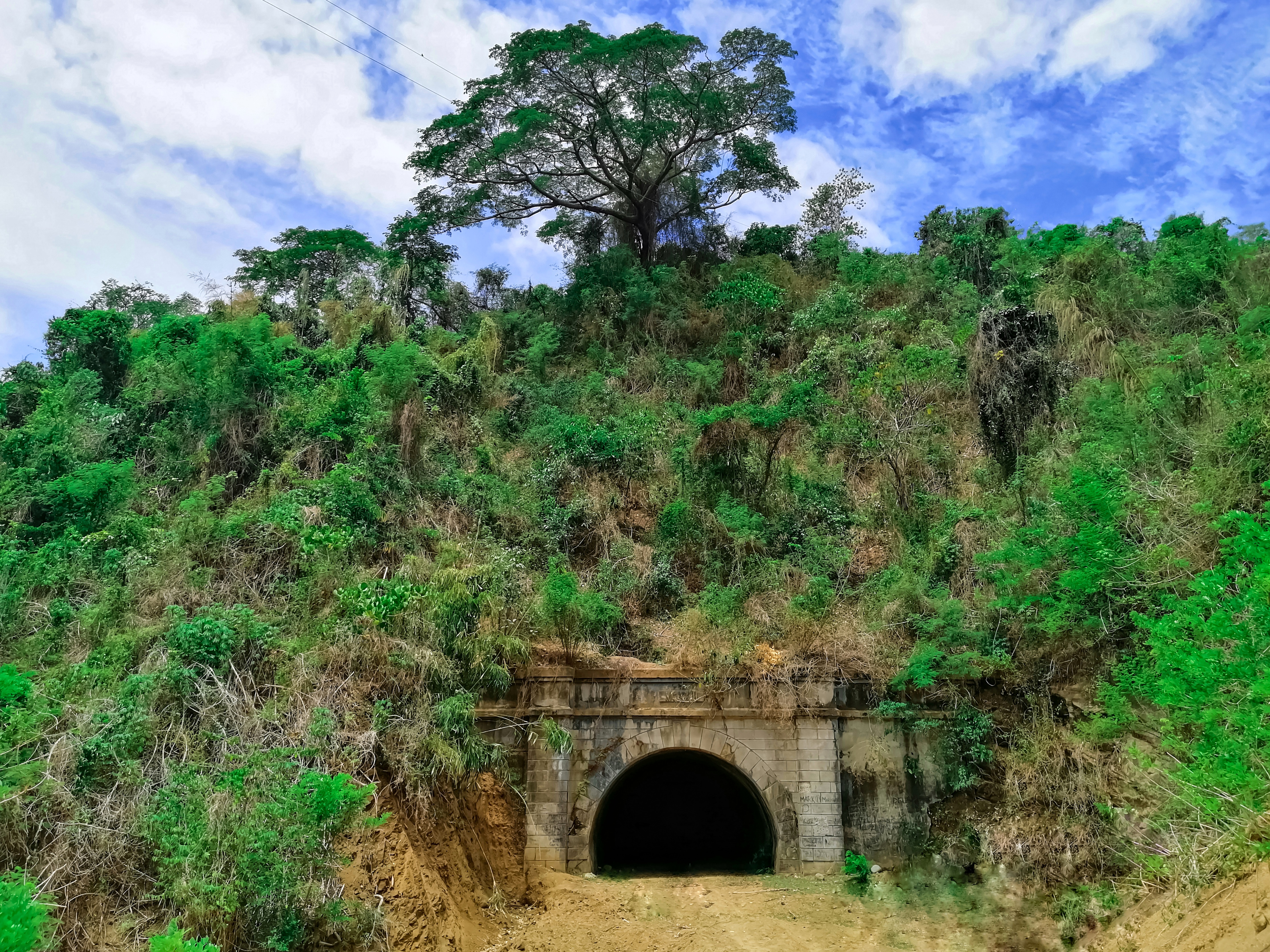
- The tunnel in May 2020

- Location within Luzon Location within Philippines

Overview
- Other name: Salapac Tunnel
- Location: Aringay, La Union
- Coordinates: 16°23′48″N 120°22′21″E
- Status: Abandoned
- Start: 1913

Operation
- Opened: N/A
- Traffic: Train
- Character: Passenger

Technical
- Length: 500 meters (1,600 ft)
- Width: 7.5 m (25 ft)

The Centennial Tunnel is an abandoned railway tunnel in Aringay, La Union, Philippines. The tunnel is 500 meters (1,600 ft) long and 7.5 meters (25 ft) wide.

== Background ==
The Centennial Tunnel was meant to be part of a passenger railway line which would connect Aringay to Baguio. The railway line's construction began in 1911 by British firm Manila Railway Co. (MRC) Ltd. The Aringay station was completed in 1912. Construction of the tunnel itself in 1913 would begin. However World War I forced MRC to abandoned the project.

During the Japanese occupation of the Philippines of World War II, the Imperial Japanese Army used the tunnel as a headquarters. The tunnel later became a popular site for treasure hunters who believe that the structure houses the supposed Yamashita's gold.

The tunnel was given the name "Centennial Tunnel" in 2013.
