= Heneral Luna =

2015 historical epic war film by Jerrold Tarog

- Official movie poster
- Directed by: Jerrold Tarog
- Written by: Henry Francia; E. A. Rocha; Jerrold Tarog
- Based on: Life of Antonio Luna
- Produced by: E.A. Rocha; Fernando Ortigas
- Starring: John Arcilla; Mon Confiado; Arron Villaflor; Joem Bascon; Archie Alemania; Epi Quizon; Nonie Buencamino; Paulo Avelino; Leo Martinez; Mylene Dizon; Ronnie Lazaro
- Cinematography: Pong Ignacio
- Edited by: Jerrold Tarog
- Music by: Jerrold Tarog
- Production company: Artikulo Uno Productions
- Distributed by: Quantum Films; Abramorama (United States)
- Release date: September 9, 2015
- Running time: 118 minutes
- Country: Philippines
- Languages: Filipino; Spanish; English
- Budget: ₱80 million
- Box office: ₱256 million

Heneral Luna is a 2015 Filipino epic war film starring John Arcilla as the titular character Antonio Luna who led the Philippine Republican Army during the early phases of the Philippine–American War. Directed by Jerrold Tarog and produced by Artikulo Uno Productions, it is the first installment of the Bayaniverse franchise. The film received critical acclaim from critics, praising its cinematography, writing, acting and plot. The film was selected as the Philippine entry for the Best Foreign Language Film at the 88th Academy Awards but it was not nominated.

With a production budget of ₱80 million, it is one of the most expensive Filipino epic historical films ever released. On September 29, 2015, it broke the previous record of ₱160 million to become the highest grossing Filipino historical film of all time. Despite a 50% discount that was offered to student viewers, by the beginning of its fourth week, the film was well on its way to reaching the ₱200 million gross ticket sales. On October 11, it was officially announced that the film had reached its ₱240 million break even point. The film's success spawned the sequel Goyo: Ang Batang Heneral, which focuses on General Gregorio Del Pilar during the Philippine–American War.

== Plot ==
Towards the end of the 19th century, Spanish colonial rule over the Philippines comes to an end and the country gains its independence. Unwilling to face humiliation, Spain secretly sells the archipelago to the victorious Americans for $20,000,000 during the Treaty of Paris.

At the Barasoain Church in Malolos, during a cabinet meeting over the growing American presence in the Philippines, cabinet members Felipe Buencamino and Pedro Paterno propose to form an alliance with the Americans to avoid open conflict but this angers Generals Antonio Luna and José Alejandrino, both of whom prefer to fight the new invaders. Meanwhile, President Emilio Aguinaldo attempts to negotiate with the Americans over the control of Manila, which is still under Spanish control. They eventually learn that the Spaniards and Americans have staged a battle which ended with the complete control of Manila transferred to the latter, thereby bringing the Philippines under American control. After an incident between American and Filipino soldiers in Manila, Aguinaldo starts a brutal resistance against the Americans to protect the country's independence.

Luna and his trusted officers – Colonel Francisco “Paco” Román, Captain Eduardo Rusca, and the Bernal brothers Captain José and Major Manuel – begin an arduous campaign against the Americans, only to face a number of setbacks. During a battle, Luna asks for reinforcements from the Kawit battalion but their commander Pedro Janolino refuses as the order did not come from Aguinaldo himself. Infuriated, Luna brutally humiliates and demotes Janolino. Luna then declares his infamous "Article One", which states that those refusing to follow his orders shall be executed on the spot, to put insubordinate soldiers and officers under his control while mobilizing more men for the army. In another meeting, Buencamino and Paterno propose to have the country become a protectorate under American rule in an attempt to secure peace, prompting Luna to arrest them as traitors. Luna's campaign is soon undermined by General Tomás Mascardo, who defies his orders. While the two generals prepare to clash in Pampanga, the Americans advance steadily, forcing the Filipino army to retreat up north alongside Aguinaldo. Distraught over the growing disunity within the Filipino army, Luna attempts to resign. Aguinaldo rejects Luna's request but he approves his other request to establish a headquarters in the north where they can launch a guerilla campaign against the Americans.

Not long after, Luna is summoned to the President's headquarters in Cabanatuan after receiving news that he has been given a position in the President's new cabinet. Despite suspicions from his officers, Luna goes with Rusca and Román beside him. Upon arrival, he discovers that Aguinaldo has left, with Buencamino, who has been released, the only cabinet member remaining. After a heated argument with Buencamino, Luna encounters Janolino and his men who brutally murder him. Román is also killed in his failed attempt to save his commander while a wounded Rusca surrenders. In the aftermath, most of Luna's officers are arrested while some are tortured and killed, including the Bernal brothers. Meanwhile, Aguinaldo requests Luna and Román be buried with full military honors while the killers are never arrested and tried for their crimes. Several decades after the war, Aguinaldo denies his involvement in Luna's assassination, calling him his most brilliant and capable general.

In a mid-credits scene, General Gregorio del Pilar prepares to cover Aguinaldo's retreat to the north. He inspects Luna's remaining men and orders his aide, Colonel Vicente Enríquez, to select 60 of them for the coming battle.

== Cast ==
=== Historical characters ===
- John Arcilla as Gen. Antonio Luna
- Mon Confiado as President Emilio Aguinaldo

==== Members of Aguinaldo's presidential cabinet ====
- Epy Quizon as Prime Minister Apolinario Mabini
- Alvin Anson as Gen. José Alejandrino
- Nonie Buencamino as Felipe Buencamino Sr.
- Leo Martinez as Pedro Paterno

==== Antonio Luna's general staff ====
- Joem Bascon as Col. Francisco "Paco" Román
- Art Acuña as Maj. Manuel Bernal
- Alex Medina as Capt. José Bernal
- Archie Alemania as Capt. Eduardo Rusca
- Ronnie Lazaro as Lt. García

==== Members of the "Cavite Faction" of the Philippine Republican Army ====
- Lorenz Martinez as Gen. Tomás Mascardo
- Ketchup Eusebio as Capt. Pedro Janolino
- Anthony Falcon as Sgt. Díaz, messenger of General Mascardo

==== Other Philippine Republican Army personnel ====
- Paulo Avelino as Gen. Gregorio "Goyo" del Pilar
- Benjamin Alves as Lt. Manuel Quezon

==== United States Army personnel ====
- Miguel Faustmann as Gen. Arthur MacArthur Jr.
- E. A. Rocha as Maj. Gen. Elwell Otis
- Greg Dorris as Maj. Gen. Wesley Merritt
- David Bianco as Maj. Peter Lorry Smith
- Rob Rownd as Col. Boyd

==== Other supporting characters ====
- Bing Pimentel as Laureana Luna, mother of Antonio Luna
- Allan Paule as Juan Luna, brother of Antonio Luna
- Marc Abaya as young Antonio Luna
- Perla Bautista as Trinidad Aguinaldo, mother of Emilio Aguinaldo
- Dido de la Paz as Don Joaquín Luna de San Pedro y Posadas, father of Antonio Luna
- Junjun Quintana as José Rizal
- Nico Antonio as Andrés Bonifacio
- Jake Feraren as Procopio Bonifacio
- Carlo Aquino as Col. Vicente Enríquez

=== Fictional or composite characters ===
- Arron Villaflor as Joven Hernándo, the film's POV character, a fictional journalist interviewing Luna.
- Mylene Dizon as Isabel, a composite character of several of the historical Luna's love interests.

== Production ==
=== Screenplay ===
The first draft of Heneral Luna was written in 1998 by E. A. Rocha and Henry Hunt Francia, who chose to write about Antonio Luna after being hired by Cirio Santiago to write a television script for a television series in celebration of the centennial of Philippine independence. When the series failed to push through, Rocha and Francia were asked to rewrite the script as a feature-length film. The film did not go into production, however, and was shelved for seventeen years. Francia died before the film's release. Eventually, Leo Martinez convinced Rocha to submit the script to the Film Development Council of the Philippines.

Jerrold Tarog, who had separately developed an interest in making a film about Antonio Luna after reading literature about him, learned about the Rocha and Francia script, and asked if he could use it for his planned film. Tarog got permission to re-write the script, which was originally written entirely in English, and then asked fellow director Alvin Yapan to help translate it into formal Tagalog. Tarog then tweaked the script further, simplifying it, and adapting it further for the appreciation of modern audiences.

Notably, one of Tarog's later changes was to separate the Mascardo and Janolino characters, which at one point had been merged into a composite character, "Mascolino", who would have taken on characteristics of both historical characters. Tarog indicated that separating the characters would help flesh the film out further, and give it more highlights.

The characters of Paco Román and Eduardo Rusca, who were portrayed in a character triptych with Luna in the film, were written to be polar opposites. Román would be a more controlled, logical character who would help bring out a more controlled side of Luna, while Rusca would be a more passionate character who could provide moments of levity throughout the film.

In an interview on Filipino music website Radio Republic, Tarog, who has a degree in music composition from the College of Music at the University of the Philippines Diliman, indicated that he approached Heneral Luna, as with all his other films, from a musical perspective. He revealed that he sometimes even did so literally - using a musical staff to lay out scenes, plotting out highs and lows, with notes corresponding scenes, and the pitch of the note corresponding to the mood.

Among Tarog's references during the rewriting of the script were Philippine National Artist Nick Joaquin's A Question of Heroes, which he used as a guide to the film's tone and in humanizing the character of the titular protagonist; and Vivencio José's The Rise and Fall of Antonio Luna, which Tarog used as the primary source on Antonio Luna's life.

=== Pre-production ===
Before meeting with Rocha regarding revising the script for the film, Tarog approached mainstream producers to do the film; he was however met with skepticism and doubts over the film's marketability, as they assumed that such a historical film "will be boring" or would not appeal to a mainstream audience. Tarog expressed difficulty into convincing them otherwise, lamenting that the local film industry has been institutionalized into producing films solely for entertainment, without taking into account those that "contribute to the minds of the people".

The film was bankrolled by businessman Fernando Ortigas' film production outfit Artikulo Uno Productions, which takes its name from the Philippine–American War military directive, prominently referenced in the film. Ortigas himself makes a brief cameo in the film. Ortigas and Rocha served as co-producers of the film. Ortigas remarked that if he would have received the script for the film a week earlier than he did, he would have just junked the script because he was not in a good state of mind to work with films at that time. He comments that the script arrived "at the right time" and said he enjoyed it.

The film went through a long pre-production phase, which allowed the film's various departments to cope with the challenges of filming a period film in contemporary settings. With roughly 90% of the film needing to be shot on location, the film required extensive location shoots in the few areas in the Philippines which still matched the architecture and environment of the period.

=== Casting ===
Speaking at a press conference for 2015 Quezon City International Film Festival, at the beginning of the film's fourth week, Producer and co-writer E.A. Rocha noted that no expense was to be spared in getting "only actors suited for the role" instead of big-name stars. Tarog said his experiences on watching John Arcilla's performance in Raymond Red's short film Anino and later in the feature film Metro Manila later influenced him to cast Arcilla as General Luna. Jericho Rosales also auditioned for the titular general but would be cast as Manuel L. Quezon for the upcoming third film Quezon.

=== Filming ===
To keep costs down and cope with the requirements of shooting a historical film in modern settings, the film hewed close to its very tightly planned shotlist. Tarog revealed that he designed his shots to reflect the two sides of Luna's personality - mostly straightforward shots to reflect his bluntness, and longer steadicam shots in moments that revealed his poetic side.

Cinematographer Pong Ignacio drew inspiration from paintings from the film's period, including Antonio Luna's brother, Juan, and referenced numerous films portraying trench warfare, citing Stanley Kubrick's 1957 film Paths of Glory as a particular inspiration. Ignacio recounts that the flashback scene to Luna's childhood, which was a single long steadicam shot involving an elaborate set, was the most challenging shot of the film.

Scenes from the film were partially shot in Magdalena, Laguna and at the Las Casas Filipinas de Acuzar resort in Bagac, Bataan.

=== Makeup and prosthetics ===
Makeup and prosthetics for the film referred extensively to actual pictures of the historical characters. Arcilla had to grow out his moustache for the film, while Confiado lost significant weight for the role. Confiado also had to spend a long time looking for a barber who could render Aguinaldo's iconic haircut well. Carmen Reyes, who oversaw the makeup and prosthetics for the film, revealed that the makeup for Bing Pimintel, who portrays Luna's mother in two time periods, was particularly challenging. She also added that the choice to portray General Mascardo with only a partially formed moustache was symbolic, reflecting his frustration about being overshadowed by Luna.

=== Visual effects ===
Visual effects company BlackBurst Inc was tasked to take on the film's visual effects, often in an effort to make a scene shot in a modern location fit seamlessly into the period storytelling of the film.

In many cases, BlackBurst removed modern elements such as electric wires from houses and other backgrounds shot on location, or changed details, such as roof shingles on buildings, to match the period. In other cases BlackBurst added digital set extensions, notably the ships in the scene of the Americans arriving in Manila, early in the film. All of the ships were added digitally using Autodesk Maya, and crafting that particular effect took the entire production timetable.

Background CEO Jauhn Dablo, who also served as the film's visual effects director, revealed that Tarog was very meticulous about the effects, paying attention even to the angle, power, and timing of individual gun shots.

=== Music ===
Aside from taking on duties as the film's director, co-writer, and editor, Tarog also composed the score of the film, drawing inspiration from numerous Russian classical composers, beginning with Igor Stravinsky mentor Nikolai Rimsky-Korsakov.

Acclaimed singer-songwriter Ebe Dancel, Tarog's fellow alumnus from the UP Rural High School in Los Baños, Laguna, was commissioned to write and perform the movie's theme song, "Hanggang Wala Nang Bukas" (Until there's no Tomorrow) which was published in October 2015 under Star Music.

== Release ==
=== Pre-release screenings ===
Pre-release screenings of the film were held at selected venues in the United States; August 30, 2015, in Anthology Film Archives Cinema in New York City and AMC Rio Cinema in Maryland, Virginia and Washington D.C.; August 31, 2015, in Marina Theater in San Francisco and Krikorian Monrovia Cinema in Los Angeles, California. The film was also screened at the Philippine Consulate General in Dubai, United Arab Emirates on August 30.

=== Marketing ===
The film was released with the tagline "Bayan o Sarili" (Tagalog, "Nation or Self?"), a tagline later used by fans on social media to criticize theaters who had pulled the film out in favor of mainstream films.

Much of the public interest in the film came from word of mouth and social media.

By September 19, the film's official trailer posted on YouTube has garnered over 1 million views and counting.

=== Theatrical release ===
The film's general release in the Philippines nationwide began on September 9, 2015.

After initially opening in about 100 theaters, Heneral Luna was pulled out in many theaters entering its second week, mostly to make way for the Hollywood and mainstream films that were scheduled to open. Down to around 40 cinemas, fans of the film rallied on social media and appealed to theater owners - especially the SM, Ayala and Robinsons cinema chains - to provide more venues for the film.

On the opening of its second week, the film was shown to 79 theaters in the Philippines and then was increased to 94 by the weekends due to the increase of popularity. Word of mouth, critical acclaim, and social media coverage boosted the film's popularity, resulting in sold-out theaters nationwide - prompting cinema owners to show it again in their theaters.

== Reception ==
=== Box office ===
Since its theatrical release on September 9, 2015, Heneral Luna has made ₱180 in million gross sales at the box office - only ₱20 million short of the ₱200 million it needs to be able to break even at the box office, after cinemas' cut in ticket sales have been considered. On September 29, 2015, it passed the ₱160 million mark to become the highest grossing Filipino historical film of all time.

As an independent film, Heneral Luna had a limited marketing budget, resulting in relatively low sales in its first week - ₱15 million from September 9 to 15, 2015.

Due to positive word of mouth, ticket sales surged on Heneral Luna's second release week, earning ₱44 million from September 16 to 22. despite the reduction in the number of theaters showing the film early in that week. The distributor of the film, Joji Alonso, noted that “the 1st day gross of the second week is way higher than the 1st day gross of the 1st week. And to think the number of theaters was reduced by more than half!”

On the third week, when even mainstream films normally see a drop in box office sales, Heneral Luna's numbers surged even higher, earning ₱104,010,219.00 from September 23 to 29.

By the beginning of its fourth week, the film was averaging gross box office sales of about ₱8.5 million a day.

Worldwide, the film made $4,625,639, including $206,040 in the USA.

=== Home media ===
A nationwide DVD release of Heneral Luna was done by distributor Magnavision, Inc. on December 18, 2015. Over 7,000 DVD copies of the film were sold in less than a month since its release making it the best-selling DVD of any Filipino historical film in the Philippines. Among the bonus features of the DVD are English subtitle, a music video for the film's official theme song, "Hanggang Wala Nang Bukas" by Ebe Dancel, a making of - documentary, and a short film entitled Illustrado Problems directed by JP Habac, which featured the illustrado characters from Heneral Luna in a comedic light. On June 11, 2016, the film was broadcast for the first time on television through the ABS-CBN network. Artikulo Uno Productions and ABS-CBN Corporation earlier announced a partnership to distribute Heneral Luna on all platforms of ABS-CBN including free-to-air, cable, global, video on demand, and pay per view.

The film has been available for streaming on YouTube since August 28, 2020.

=== Filmmakers ===
A forum dubbed as “The Heneral Luna Revolution: Game Changer in Film Distribution” was held at Cinema 1 of Trinoma on October 27, 2015. The forum co-presented by QCinema and InterAksyon.com mainly tackled about the box office success of Heneral Luna and how could other indie films replicate this feat. The forum was moderated by InterAksyon.com editor-in-chief Roby Alampay and led by panel members director Jerrold Tarog and associate producers Vincent Nebrida and Ria Limjap.

=== Critical reception ===
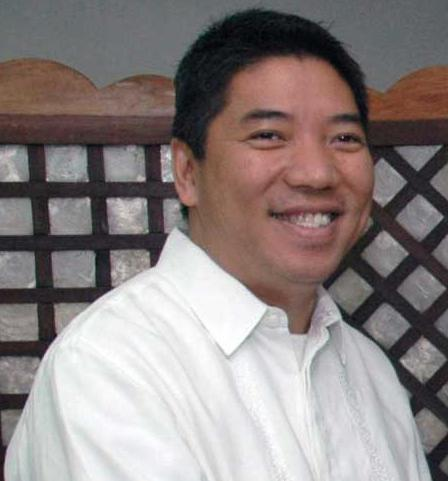
Ambeth Ocampo, historian and former National Commission for Culture and the Arts chairperson, was among the people who made a critical review on the film

Heneral Luna received mostly positive reviews from film critics in the Philippines and historians alike.

Historian and former National Commission for Culture and the Arts chair Ambeth Ocampo strongly recommended the film, calling it "an engaging narrative, supported by wonderful cinematography and grounded on sound historical research." He added that "When I previewed the film, I commented that it should not open with a disclaimer simply because it is a cinematic retelling of what many consider textbook history and is not a doctoral dissertation."

Comparisons have been drawn between Arcilla's portrayal of Luna in the film, and that of the character he played in John Sayles' 2010 film Amigo, which was also set during the Filipino-American War, albeit on a much smaller scale - depicting the war as it was experienced in a single barrio. Philippine Daily Inquirer Arts and Books editor Lito B. Zulueta suggests that "By focusing on arguably the most rugged—and therefore the most dynamic—figure of the Philippine war against the American invaders, Jerrold Tarog’s 'Heneral Luna' revives the historical action movie and in effect, revitalizes two dormant genres—the action film and more important, the historical film." Michael Kho Lim from the Daily Tribune also gave a positive review, saying “Timely as it is significant. John Arcilla breathes life to Luna. Complex. Poetic. Gripping.”

Rappler critic Oggs Cruz calls the film "precise in its storytelling and in its depiction of the major players of the revolution," furthering that "John Arcilla is excellent. Tarog makes his character human… and creates an essay of everything that is wrong with our nationhood. Tarog’s Heneral Luna is fascinating, beautiful to gaze at, and genuinely affecting."

Rotten Tomatoes, a review aggregator gives the film a score of 79% based on 9 reviews, with an average rating of 5.30/10. At Metacritic, the film has a weighted average score of 58 out of 100, based on 5 critics, indicating "mixed or average reviews". Heneral Luna received a Grade A from Cinema Evaluation Board of the Philippines.

=== Accolades ===
List of accolades
Award / Film Festival	Category	Recipient(s)	Result
Luna Awards 2016
Luna Awards 2016	Best Picture	Heneral Luna	Won
Luna Awards 2016	Best Director	Jerrold Tarrog	Won
Luna Awards 2016	Best Screenplay	Henry Francia, E.A. Rocha, and Jerrold Tarog	Won
Luna Awards 2016	Best Actor	John Arcilla	Won
Luna Awards 2016	Best Supporting Actor	Nonie Buencamino	Won
Luna Awards 2016	Best Supporting Actress	Mylene Dizon	Nominated
Luna Awards 2016	Best Cinematography	Pong Ignacio	Won
Luna Awards 2016	Best Production Design	Benjamin Padero and Carlo Tabije	Won
Luna Awards 2016	Best Editing	Jerrold Tarog	Won
Luna Awards 2016	Best Musical Scoring	Jerrold Tarog	Won
Luna Awards 2016	Best Sound	Mikko Quizon	Won
39th Gawad Urian Awards	Best Picture	Heneral Luna	Nominated
39th Gawad Urian Awards	Best Director	Jerrold Tarog	Won
39th Gawad Urian Awards	Best Editing	Jerrold Tarog	Won
39th Gawad Urian Awards	Best Screenplay	Jerrold Tarog, Henry Francia, and E.A Rocha	Nominated
39th Gawad Urian Awards	Best Cinematography	Pong Ignacio	Won
39th Gawad Urian Awards	Best Editing	Jerrold Tarog	Won
39th Gawad Urian Awards	Best Music	Jerrold Tarog	Nominated
39th Gawad Urian Awards	Best Sound	Mikko Quizon	Won
2016 Platinum Stallion Media Awards	Best Student-Oriented Film	Jerrold Tarog	Won
2016 Platinum Stallion Media Awards	Best Film Actor	John Arcilla	Won
14th Gawad Tanglaw Awards	Student's Choice Award for Best Film	Jerrold Tarog	Won
14th Gawad Tanglaw Awards	Best Cinematography	Pong Ignacio	Won
14th Gawad Tanglaw Awards	Gantimpalang Dr. Jaime G. Ang; Presidential Jury Award for Film	John Arcilla	Won
10th Asian Film Awards	Best Actor	John Arcilla	Nominated
10th Asian Film Awards	Best Costume Design	Carlo Tabije	Nominated
10th Asian Film Awards	Best Production Design	Benjamin Padero, Carlo Tabije	Nominated
32nd PMPC Star Awards for Movies	Movie of the Year	Heneral Luna	Nominated
32nd PMPC Star Awards for Movies	Movie Director of the Year	Jerrold Tarog	Nominated
32nd PMPC Star Awards for Movies	Movie Actor of the Year	John Arcilla	Nominated
32nd PMPC Star Awards for Movies	Movie Supporting Actor of the Year	Noni Buencamino	Nominated
32nd PMPC Star Awards for Movies	Movie Supporting Actor of the Year	Mon Confiado	Nominated
32nd PMPC Star Awards for Movies	Movie Supporting Actress of the Year	Mylene Dizon	Nominated
32nd PMPC Star Awards for Movies	Movie Screenwriter of the Year	Henry Francia, E.A. Rocha, and Jerrold Tarog	Nominated
32nd PMPC Star Awards for Movies	Movie Cinematographer of the Year	Pong Ignacio	Nominated
32nd PMPC Star Awards for Movies	Movie Production Designer of the Year	Benjamin Padero and Carlo Tabije	Nominated
32nd PMPC Star Awards for Movies	Movie Editor of the Year	Jerrold Tarog	Won
32nd PMPC Star Awards for Movies	Movie Musical Scorer of the Year	Jerrold Tarog	Won
32nd PMPC Star Awards for Movies	Movie Sound Engineer of the Year	Mikko Quizon and Hit Productions	Won
32nd PMPC Star Awards for Movies	Movie Original Theme Song of the Year	Hanggang Wala Nang Wakas, composed, arranged, and interpreted by Ebe Dancel	Nominated
2016 Box Office Entertainment Awards	Highest Grossing Historical Film of All Time	Heneral Luna	Won

== Themes and symbolism ==
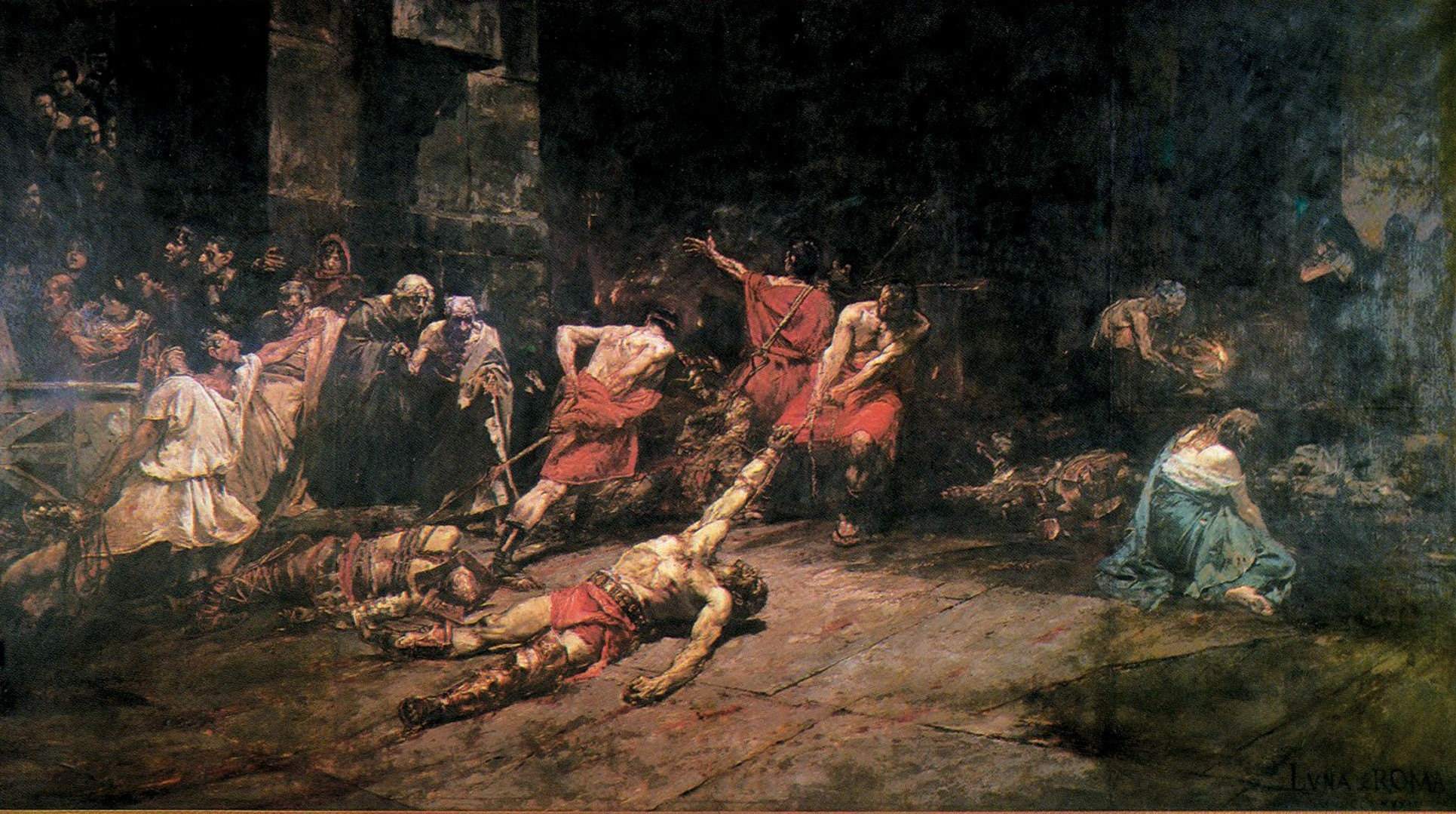
The Spoliarium

The scene which was made to resemble the painting on the left.

A number of visual motifs throughout film have symbolic significance, particularly for audiences familiar with the History of the period and Filipino culture.

A Philippine revolutionary flag is displayed prominently in the film's bookend scenes, becoming dirtier and more ragged when the film reverts to its framing device as the events of the film unfold. The burning flag during the end credits is a poignant experience for Filipino audiences, as flag-burning is not legal under the Flag and Heraldic Code of the Philippines.

In a scene towards the end of the film, the bodies of Luna and Román are dragged across the courtyard in a manner highly reminiscent of the Spoliarium, a painting which has served as artistic icon of Filipino nationalism, painted in 1884 by Luna's own brother, Juan Luna.

== Historical accuracy and significance ==
With much of the film based on the works of Vivencio R. Jose, the film not only stayed true to the broad historical narrative, but to lesser known elements of Luna's personality, such as his penchant for musical instruments, his close relationship to his mother, his love of women, and his passion for the Philippine countryside.

Tarog described the film as an "attempt to identify the ills" of Philippine society, emphasizing that the Filipinos' biggest enemy has been their own selves and not necessarily colonialization, and has been in "a cycle of betrayal".

In one of the press conferences for the film's release, Tarog noted that the film took minor creative liberties such as Antonio Luna's frequent usage of the Filipino profanity such as the word putang ina (roughly translated as "son of a bitch") in the film in an effort to connect the film to the Filipino millennial generation which was the film's target audience. There were also inaccuracies in the film's battle scenes. In its depiction of the Battle of Santo Tomas, the Filipinos are shown to be victorious against the Americans when in fact it was the Americans who won and they only suffered two casualties. Also, the man who saved Luna after his brave charge on horseback wasn't Colonel Roman as depicted in film, but was actually Alejandro Avecilla.

Historian and columnist John Nery notes that an important part of Luna's personal history, his non-support of the first phase of the Philippine revolution - is not mentioned in the film, although he also notes that the event takes place outside the movie's timeframe, and the film does not contradict it. Nery notes that, "Luna’s atonement is not part of the movie’s backstory (although on viewing the movie a second time I imagined it would easily fit the movie’s main narrative). Does this lessen director Jerrold Tarog’s work, or lead actor John Arcilla’s art? I do not think so, because the movie approaches the Luna story on its own terms."

One of the creative liberties taken by the film with the historical timeline is that it portrays Apolinario Mabini as still holding a position of leadership at Luna's funeral, in June 1899; historically, however, Mabini had been pressured by his political adversaries into resigning from government a month earlier, in May 1899, replaced in his post as Prime Minister by Pedro Paterno. The film portrays the relationship between Mabini and Pedro Paterno as amicable.

=== Isabel and conspiracy theories related to Ysidra Cojuangco ===
In an interview with CNN Philippines' Pia Hontiveros, Tarog revealed that the name of the character Isabel, played by Mylene Dizon, is "a wink" to conspiracy theorists who believe there was a relationship between Luna and Ysidra Cojuangco. According to the theory, made popular early in the term of President Benigno Aquino III, who is a descendant of Cojuangco, money squirreled away by Luna from the revolution was actually the source of the Cojuangco family fortune. However, Tarog also revealed that he found no evidence of any such relationship between Ysidra and Luna, and that the name was thus nothing more than a humorous reference. Instead, Tarog revealed that Dizon's character was a composite of several of Luna's lovers and Nicolasa Dayrit, the woman who tried to intervene between Mascardo and Luna during their argument.

== Controversies ==
Given the socio-political nature of the film's themes, and the production's success relative to the majority of the Philippines' indie films and historical films, numerous aspects of the public reception to the film have been covered in media.

=== Early pull-out ===
One of the more unusual aspects of the public response to Heneral Luna was the successful campaign to put the film back in theaters. At first, more than half of the theaters that premiered the movie on September 9 had pulled it out after less than 5 days, which is typical practice for commercial movie theaters showing independent Filipino films. By September 16, only 40 of the 101 theaters that premiered it were still showing it. This resulted in a clamor among netizens and artists to bring the film back. This helped create word of mouth publicity for the film after its first week, resulting in packed cinemas on the film's first weekend. As a result, cinemas decided to screen the film again, with second and third week box office results significantly higher than the first. By the end of the film's first weekend, Heneral Luna was showing in 120 cinemas - higher than the number of cinemas that originally screened it.

=== Lack of knowledge about Mabini's paralysis ===
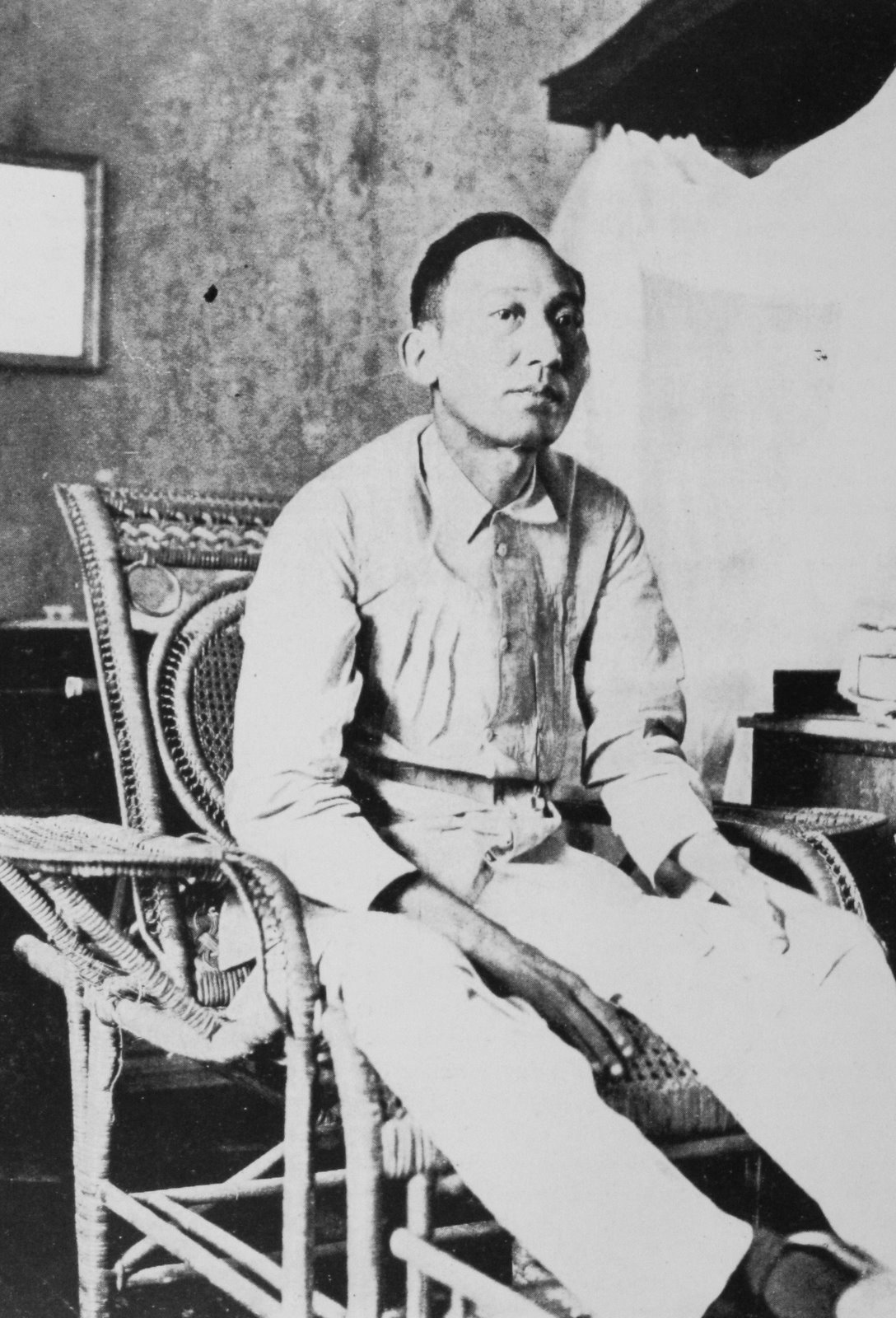
Apolinario Mabini

The film's popularity has also led to some criticism of the Philippine educational system, due to reports of numerous incidents - including one during a Q&A with actor Epy Quizon, who portrayed Apolinario Mabini in the film - in which school-age youths asked why Mabini never stood up throughout the film, implying a lack of familiarity with the famously paralytic statesman. President Benigno Aquino III noted this as well. In the 2015 Gawad Apolinario Mabini awarding ceremonies on September 29, 2015, he noted the issue was "a reflection of how little some of the youth know about history," considering Mabini's intelligence played a role in building the Philippines' democratic institution. He later hinted about tasking Education Secretary Armin Luistro to resolve the impasse.

=== Portrayal of Aguinaldo ===
A number of historians have noted that the film's portrayal of Emilio Aguinaldo is more negative than it thought to be by the viewers due to the plot. Reacting to the film, Transport secretary Joseph Emilio Abaya, who is one of Aguinaldo's descendants, said that he maintains his belief that his great-grandfather did not assassinate Luna.Kawit, Cavite Mayor Angelo Emilio Aguinaldo said during the sidelines of the municipality's tourism campaign launch. He is not happy about as historical movies made over the past few years, the filmmakers were debasing General Emilio Aguinaldo. He also revealed that neither he nor the members of his family were informed of the film, nor did they have their permission.

However, the director has indicated that one of the hopes of the planned trilogy is to present a more rounded portrayal of Aguinaldo. Actor Mon Confiado was given specific instructions never to portray Aguinaldo as a villain - while the audience might see him as a villain because of the plot, the portrayal itself would hinge on character motivations, such as the need for self-preservation, and never simple villainy.

=== Unauthorized releases ===
Upon learning that bootleg copies of the film were already circulating, the cast and crew of the film campaigned on social media to discourage potential viewers from buying or downloading unlicensed copies of the film, and were soon joined by fans posting image macros and other such memes encouraging viewers to support the film instead of unauthorized copies. The Optical Media Board and the Philippine National Police made raids against the distribution of illegal DVD copies of the film.

== Sequel ==
Noting the breakout success of Heneral Luna, director Jerrold Tarog said there are plans to make it the first of a trilogy if it generated enough revenues. The other two films would individually focus on Gregorio del Pilar and Manuel L. Quezon. Tarog likened the mid-credits scene of Heneral Luna to mid- or end-credit scenes of films in the Marvel Cinematic Universe that show potential plot points in an upcoming film. Tarog has also expressed interest in making a film featuring female revolutionary Teresa Magbanua, who led troops in the Visayas region during the war.

At an interview on Radio Republic, Tarog indicated that his next project as a director would either be an adaptation of Arnold Arre's The Mythology Class, or the sequel to Heneral Luna, whose title he revealed to be Goryo (which would eventually be changed later to Goyo: Ang Batang Heneral), confirming that it would focus on Gregorio del Pilar. At a special thanksgiving party on October 29, 2015 - Antonio Luna's 149th birth anniversary - co-producer EA Rocha confirmed that the del Pilar biopic is "in development" with a projected release scheduled in a few years time.

On February 6, 2017, Tarog announced through his Twitter account that a short film bridging the events of Heneral Luna to that of Goyo: Ang Batang Heneral would be released on February 15 alongside the film I'm Drunk, I Love You. The 20-minute short film, titled Angelito, focused on the fate of the Bernal brothers after Luna's assassination with Art Acuña, Alex Medina, Arron Villaflor and Carlo Aquino reprising their roles in Heneral Luna.

== In popular culture ==
Due to the film's success, KFC Philippines released commercials featuring Arcilla reprising his role as the film's titular character in late 2017 for their Christmas promos. The first commercial features Luna planning to demote himself to colonel to promote the fast food chain's Christmas offers. A second commercial was released; while also promoting the same products and offers, it featured Luna with three Filipino KFC colonels played by Ronaldo Valdez, Leo Martinez, and Pen Medina.

== See also ==
- Antonio Luna
- Apolinario Mabini
- Emilio Aguinaldo
- Philippine–American War
- Jerrold Tarog
- Sakay (film)
- Amigo (film)
- El Presidente (film)
- Bonifacio: Ang Unang Pangulo
- The Trial of Andres Bonifacio (film)
