= TBA Studios =

Philippine film production company

- Company type: Private
- Industry: Entertainment
- Founded: 2017; 9 years ago
- Headquarters: 3/F Anonas LRT City Center, Aurora Boulevard, Cubao, Quezon City, Metro Manila, Philippines
- Area served: Worldwide
- Key people: Fernando Ortigas; EA Rocha
- Products: Motion pictures
- Divisions: Tuko Film Productions; Buchi Boy Entertainment; Artikulo Uno Productions
- Website: tba.ph

TBA Studios is a Philippine independent production company. Co-founded by Fernando Ortigas and EA Rocha, it is an aggrupation of three independent film productions: Tuko Film Productions, Buchi Boy Entertainment, and Artikulo Uno Productions.

== Filmography ==
Films produced and/or distributed by TBA Studios.

=== Pre-TBA ===
Title	Released date	Associated film production	Ref.
K'na, the Dreamweaver	August 2, 2014	Tuko Film Productions; Buchi Boy Entertainment	
Bonifacio: Ang Unang Pangulo	December 25, 2014	Philippians Productions and Entertainment; Tuko Film Productions; Buchi Boy Entertainment; RCP Production	
Water Lemon	April 24, 2015	Tuko Film Productions; Buchi Boy Entertainment	
Gayuma	October 22, 2015	Tuko Film Productions; Buchi Boy Entertainment	
Heneral Luna	September 9, 2015	Artikulo Uno Productions	
Iisa	October 22, 2015	Tuko Film Productions; Buchi Boy Entertainment	
Matangtubig	October 22, 2015	Tuko Film Productions; Buchi Boy Entertainment	
Tandem	February 17, 2016	Tuko Film Productions; Buchi Boy Entertainment; Quantum Films	
1-2-3 (Gasping For Air)	August 5, 2016	Tuko Film Productions; Buchi Boy Entertainment	
Patintero: Alamat ni Meng Patalo	October 5, 2016	Tuko Film Productions; Buchi Boy Entertainment	

=== 2016–present ===
Title	Released date	Associated film production	Ref.
Women of the Weeping River	October 15, 2016	Tuko Film Productions; Buchi Boy Entertainment	
Birdshot	October 28, 2016 (TIFF, Japan); August 4, 2017 (Cínemalayà, Philippines)	PelikulaRed; Tuko Film Productions; Buchi Boy Entertainment	
Sunday Beauty Queen	October 7, 2016 (BIFF, South Korea); December 25, 2016 (MMFF, Philippines)	Tuko Film Productions; Buchi Boy Entertainment	
Ang Kwentong Nating Dalawa	June 27, 2015 (World Premieres Film Festival); November 9, 2016		
I'm Drunk, I Love You	February 15, 2017	Tuko Film Productions; Buchi Boy Entertainment	
Bliss	May 10, 2017	Artikulo Uno Productions; Quantum Films	
Neomanila	October 20, 2017	Artikulo Uno Productions; Buchi Boy Entertainment; Monoxide Works; PelikulaRed; Tuko Film Productions; Waning Crescent Arts	
Dormitoryo (Mga Walang Katapusang Kwarto)	October 20, 2017	Tuko Film Productions; Buchi Boy Entertainment	
Smaller and Smaller Circles	December 6, 2017	Tuko Film Productions; Buchi Boy Entertainment	
Goyo: Ang Batang Heneral	September 5, 2018	Artikulo Uno Productions; Globe Studios	
Kung Paano Siya Nawala	November 14, 2018	Arkeofilms; Tuko Film Productions; Buchi Boy Entertainment	
Tayo sa Huling Buwan ng Taon	May 8, 2019		
Write About Love	December 25, 2019		
Lingua Franca	August 26, 2020 (USA)	7107 Entertainment; TBA Studios; ARRAY	
Dito at Doon	March 17, 2021	WASD Films	
Quezon	October 15, 2025		

=== International films ===
Title	Release date	Notes	Ref.
Everything Everywhere All At Once	June 28, 2022	Produced by A24	
Fanny: The Right to Rock	September 7, 2022	Produced by Adobe Productions International	
Triangle of Sadness	November 30, 2022	Produced by Plattform Produktion, Essential Films	
Plan 75	December 7, 2022	Produced by Loaded Films, Urban Factory, Happinet-Phantom Studios, Dongyu Club, WOWOW, Fusee	
Nocebo	January 18, 2023	Produced by XYZ Films, RLJE Films, Epic Media	
The Whale	February 22, 2023	Produced by A24, Protozoa Pictures	
Ajoomma	March 15, 2023	Produced by Giraffe Pictures, Rediance, Singapore Film Commission	
Past Lives	August 30, 2023	Produced by A24, CJ E&M, 2AM, Killer Films	
Sound of Freedom	September 20, 2023	Produced by Angel Studios, Santa Fe Films	
Cobweb	October 4, 2023	Produced by Barunson E&A, Anthology Studio	
