= Cris Villanueva =

Filipino actor (born 1971)

- Born: May 23, 1971 (age 55); Baliuag, Bulacan, Philippines
- Occupation: Actor
- Years active: 1980–present
- Known for: That's Entertainment; Bayaning 3rd World

Krishnamurti Villanueva (born May 23, 1971) is a Filipino actor. He was a former matinee idol in the late 1980s. He was a cast member of That's Entertainment, a youth-oriented talent and variety show now defunct in the Philippines.

== Career ==
Villanueva started as commercial model of Coca-Cola until discovered by Deo Fajardo. He became a member of That's Entertainment. He received a nomination from FAMAS Awards (Filipino Academy of Movie Arts and Sciences), Luna Awards (Film Academy of the Philippines), Star Awards for Movies (Philippine Movie Press Club) and Gawad Urian Award for Best Supporting Actor in Miguel/Michelle (1998). He starred as Filmmaker 2 in Bayaning 3rd World (1999), in which Villanueva was nominated for Gawad Urian Best Actor.

He played as the father of Jillian Ward in Mars Ravelo's TV series Trudis Liit showed in GMA Network. In 2011, Cris Villanueva made a comeback in ABS-CBN as Rocco Amarillo in Mula sa Puso - Rocco Amarillo is the biological father of Gabriel (JM De Guzman) who saved the life of Magda (Dawn Zulueta) under the direction of Wenn V. Deramas. He was included in the powerhouse cast of Kahit Puso'y Masugatan, TV series aired in ABS-CBN starring Iza Calzado, Gabby Concepcion, Andi Eigenmann and Jake Cuenca.

== Filmography ==
=== Film ===
| Year | Title | Role |
|---|---|---|
| 1988 | Bobo Cop | |
| 1988 | Wake Up Little Susie | Cris Cross |
| 1988 | Love Letters | |
| 1988 | Petrang Kabayo at ang Pilyang Kuting | |
| 1988 | Jockey T'yan | |
| 1989 | Starzan: Shouting Star of the Jungle | Anton |
| 1989 | Pulis, Pulis sa Ilalim ng Tulay | |
| 1989 | Tamis ng Unang Halik | |
| 1989 | Huwag Kang Hahalik sa Diyablo | |
| 1990 | I Have 3 Eggs | |
| 1990 | Papa's Girl | |
| 1990 | Lessons in Love | |
| 1996 | Tirad Pass: The Last Stand of Gen. Gregorio del Pilar | |
| 1996 | Madrasta | Dan |
| 1997 | Calvento Files: The Movie | Ernesto |
| 1998 | Miguel/Michelle | Julio |
| 2000 | Bayaning 3rd World | Filmmaker #2 |
| 2000 | Tatlong Puso, Iisang Pangarap | |
| 2002 | Chiffons | |
| 2002 | Kailangan Kita | Father Ruben |
| 2004 | Sinful Nights | |
| 2005 | Pepot Superstar | |
| 2005 | Ang Lagusan | |
| 2005 | The Family That Eats Soil | |
| 2007 | Balikbayan Box | |
| 2009 | I Love You, Goodbye | Arthur |
| 2012 | The Healing | Ding |
| 2014 | Maria Leonora Teresa | Dr. Manolo Apacible |
| 2016 | Barcelona: A Love Untold | Benjamin "Ben" Antipala |
| 2018 | Goyo: Ang Batang Heneral | old Joven Hernendo |
| 2019 | Isa Pa with Feelings | Bert Navarro |
| 2020 | U Turn | Albert |
| 2025 | Quezon | older Joven Hernando |
| 2026 | 18th Rose | Rene |

=== Television/digital series ===
| Year | Title | Role |
|---|---|---|
| 1986–1996 | That's Entertainment | Performer |
| 1996 | Bayani | Emilio Jacinto |
| 2001–2002 | Recuerdo de Amor | Stanley Liu |
| 2002 | Kay Tagal Kang Hinintay | Lenin Forte |
| 2004 | Spirits | Supporting Role |
| 2005 | Now and Forever: Dangal | Alfred |
| 2006 | Maalaala Mo Kaya: Posas | Mr. Ablaza |
| 2006 | Maalaala Mo Kaya: Juice | Guest Star |
| 2006 | Makita Ka Lang Muli | Supporting Role |
| 2007 | Maalaala Mo Kaya: Sako | Giling |
| 2008 | Lobo | Minyong |
| 2008 | Maalaala Mo Kaya: Kanin | Benjie |
| 2009 | Your Song: Boystown | Antonio Santillian |
| 2009 | Maalaala Mo Kaya: Storybook | Guest Star |
| 2009 | Maalaala Mo Kaya: Tsinelas | Mr. Simples |
| 2010 | Sine Novela: Trudis Liit | Nick Ferrer |
| 2010 | First Time | Ben Gomez |
| 2010 | Precious Hearts Romances Presents: Midnight Phantom | Augusto Dela Merced |
| 2011 | Dwarfina | Kardo Ballesteros |
| 2011 | Wansapanataym: Wallet | Danny |
| 2011 | Maalaala Mo Kaya: Toga | Rodrigo |
| 2011 | Mula sa Puso | Rocco Amarillo |
| 2011 | Budoy | Henry Chavez |
| 2012 | My Beloved | Crisanto |
| 2012 | Kahit Puso'y Masugatan | Bong Madriaga |
| 2013 | Maalaala Mo Kaya: Puntod | Roque |
| 2013 | Maalaala Mo Kaya: Drawing | Berto |
| 2013 | Wansapanataym: Flores de Yayo | Fernan |
| 2013 | Maalaala Mo Kaya: Picture Frame | Robert |
| 2013–2014 | Be Careful With My Heart | Ryan Molina |
| 2013–2014 | Jim Fernandez's Galema, Anak ni Zuma | Richard Alvarez |
| 2014 | Ipaglaban Mo: Lalaban ang Tatay para Sa'yo | Rico |
| 2014 | Maalaala Mo Kaya: Train | Daddy |
| 2015 | Once Upon a Kiss | Eric Almario |
| 2015 | Marimar | Padre Sito Porres |
| 2015 | FPJ's Ang Probinsyano | Father Torre |
| 2016 | Magpakailanman: The Rape of Rosie | Rigor |
| 2016 | Maalaala Mo Kaya: Toga | Sulpicio |
| 2016 | Magpahanggang Wakas | Simon Flores |
| 2017 | A Love to Last | Paul Silverio |
| 2017 | Magpakailanman: The Jeremy Sabido Story | Pepito |
| 2017 | Ipaglaban Mo: Patol | Ivan |
| 2018 | La Luna Sangre | Osmundo Mercado |
| 2018 | Maalaala Mo Kaya: Surfboard | Nestor |
| 2018 | Ipaglaban Mo: Pangalan | Ronald Hermosa |
| 2018 | Halik | Rafael "Paeng" Corpuz |
| 2018 | Ipaglaban Mo: Hukay | Kanor Miranda |
| 2019 | Wansapanataym: Mr. Cutepido | Charles |
| 2019 | Maalaala Mo Kaya: Medalya | Wardo |
| 2019 | The Killer Bride | Luciano Dela Torre |
| 2019 | Ipaglaban Mo: Desperada | Harley Buenaobra |
| 2020–2021 | Bagong Umaga | Christian "Ian" Veradona |
| 2021 | Maalaala Mo Kaya: Flyers | Jericho Cacdac |
| 2021 | Maalaala Mo Kaya: Bisikleta | Jericho Cacdac |
| 2022 | 2 Good 2 Be True | Capt. Rafael Rosales |
| 2023 | The Iron Heart | Atty. Theo de Legazpi |
| 2023 | Family Feud | Himself / Player |
| 2023 | TiktoClock | Himself / Guest |
| 2023 | Magpakailanman: Sa Puso't Isipan: The Cantillana Family Story | Bobet |
| 2024 | Makiling | Crisanto Lirio |
| 2024 | Magpakailanman: A Mother's Wish | Oyo |
| 2024 | Can't Buy Me Love | Gilbert Bautista |
| 2024 | Pamilya Sagrado | Henry Torres |
| 2024 | Padyak Princess | Martin Nieva |
| 2025 | Binibining Marikit | Isagani "Gani" Caringal |
| 2025 | Mga Batang Riles | Carlos "Caloy" Asuncion |
| 2025 | Incognito | Pedro Malvar |
| 2025–2026 | Roja | Engr. Mike del Rosario |
| 2026 | Rainbow Rumble | Himself / Contestant |
| 2026 | Miss Behave | Adolf Javier |
