= Rody Vera =

Filipino playwright, actor, and director

- Born: Rodolfo C. Vera; December 5, 1960 (age 65)
- Occupations: Playwright; theater actor; director

Rodolfo C. Vera (born December 5, 1960), commonly known as Rody Vera, is a Filipino playwright, theater actor, and director.

Vera was affiliated with the Philippine Educational Theater Association (PETA) as a theater actor and artistic director.

As a playwright, Vera wrote more than 25 original plays, 10 of which have won Palanca Awards. He has also adopted and translated 20 foreign-language plays into Filipino such as Bertolt Brecht's Mother Courage and Her Children, William Shakespeare's Macbeth, Jean Genet's The Maids, and Anton Chekhov's Three Sisters and The Cherry Orchard He is also a Palanca Awards Hall of Fame inductee.

He also wrote lyrics of various liturgical protest songs.

He was awarded the Gawad Tanglaw ng Lahi in 2015 by the Ateneo de Manila University. In 2019, he was conferred the Dangal ni Balagtas award by the Commission on the Filipino Language for his contribution to Philippine literature.
