= List of Coffee Prince episodes =

The following is a list of episodes of Coffee Prince, a Filipino romantic-comedy series adapted by Des Garbes Severino, which premiered on GMA Network on October 8, 2012, on GMA Telebabad block. The series ended on November 23, 2012, with the total of thirty five episodes.

The series is based on Sun-mi Lee's novel and MBC's 2007 hit Korean television series, The 1st Shop of Coffee Prince. The series is directed by Ricky Davao.

The forty-five-minute scripted drama follows the lives and loves of Andy, a girl who disguises herself as a man just to get the job in a coffee shop and Arthur, a happy-go-lucky and wealthy bachelor whose paternal grandmother pushes him to settle down and start a family. In order to avoid the constant request from his relatives, he will hire Andy to pretend as his gay lover without even knowing that the latter is a real woman.

== Plot ==
A romance brews between the most unlikely of couples at a coffee shop—Andy is a tomboy who works at the coffee shop owned by Arthur, the charming heir to a food and beverage company. Because of his good looks, Arthur is hounded by a lot of ladies, a situation he does not find amusing. To avoid this unwanted attention, Arthur pretends to be gay and woos Andy to be his fake lover, not knowing Andy's true identity.

== Main casts ==
- Kris Bernal as Andrea "Andy" Gomez
- Aljur Abrenica as Arthur Ochoa
- Benjamin Alves as Errol Ochoa
- Max Collins as Arlene Manahan

== List of episodes ==
| No. | Title | Original release date | Prod. code |
|---|---|---|---|
| 1 | "Instant Breadwinner" | October 8, 2012 | 1001 - A |
| 2 | "Instant Breadwinner" | October 9, 2012 | 1002 - B |
| 3 | "Instant Breadwinner" | October 10, 2012 | 1003 - C |
| 4 | "Instant Breadwinner" | October 11, 2012 | 1004 - D |
| 5 | "Instant Breadwinner" | October 12, 2012 | 1005 - E |
After the death of her father, Andy Gomez instantly became the breadwinner of the family. To sustain their daily needs, she earns a living as a tricycle driver and taking odd jobs like delivering water or food orders. But one day, Andy finds herself in need of big amount of cash to pay her family's debts. On the other side of the story is Arthur Ochoa, a happy-go-lucky and impulsive heir to a huge coffee company. Arthur's grandmother, Mamita made an arrangement for Arthur to work at the coffee shop that they own.
| 6 | "The Coffee Prince" | October 15, 2012 | 1007 - G |
| 7 | "The Coffee Prince" | October 16, 2012 | 1006 - F |
| 8 | "The Coffee Prince" | October 17, 2012 | 1009 - I |
| 9 | "The Coffee Prince" | October 18, 2012 | 1008 - H |
| 10 | "The Coffee Prince" | October 19, 2012 | 1010 - J |
Andy pretends to be a guy to bag a job in Coffee Prince—a coffee shop owned by the cocky Arthur. Arthur, on the other hand, has his share of problems too. His grandmother Mamita constantly pressures him to settle down. To be free of his granny's consistent prodding, Arthur offers Andy a contract—in which "he" must pretend to be his gay lover in exchange for a huge amount of money. Andy is left with no choice but to take the opportunity to pay her family’s debts. Meanwhile, Andy meets Errol—his prince charming.
| 11 | "A Table for Four" | October 22, 2012 | 1011 - K |
| 12 | "A Table for Four" | October 23, 2012 | 1014 - N |
| 13 | "A Table for Four" | October 24, 2012 | 1013 - M |
| 14 | "A Table for Four" | October 25, 2012 | 1016 - P |
| 15 | "A Table for Four" | October 26, 2012 | 1012 - L |
It is the re-opening of the shop—Coffee Prince—and it seems to turn out to be a big hit. After a hard day's work, Arthur and Arlene meet up late night. Meanwhile, Andy and Eroll go on a big date. As they head off to the art gallery exhibit, Andy learns how coincidence and fate has played with her, yet again.
| 16 | "Perfect Blend" | October 29, 2012 | 1015 - O |
| 17 | "Perfect Blend" | October 30, 2012 | 1017 - Q |
| 18 | "Perfect Blend" | October 31, 2012 | 1018 - R |
| 19 | "Perfect Blend" | November 1, 2012 | 1020 - T |
| 20 | "Perfect Blend" | November 2, 2012 | 1019 - S |
Arthur gets to bond with Andy's family in Batangas. As they spend more time together, the latter can't control her emotions and starts to fall in love with Arthur. Andy's mother Beth and sister Mylene ask her if she likes Arthur but Andy says it's impossible for Arthur to like her since he knows she is a guy. Meanwhile, Mang Ernie, while intoxicated, asks Arthur to take care of Andy since he treats her like his own daughter. He even confesses to him that Andy is really a girl. But Arthur ignores his revelation.
| 21 | "Romance Brews" | November 5, 2012 | 1021 - U |
| 22 | "Romance Brews" | November 6, 2012 | 1022 - V |
| 23 | "Romance Brews" | November 7, 2012 | 1024 - X |
| 24 | "Romance Brews" | November 8, 2012 | 1023 - W |
| 25 | "Romance Brews" | November 9, 2012 | 1025 - Y |
Arthur can't seem to comprehend the feelings that stir inside of him whenever Andy and he are around together. He sends pastries to Andy's family which will trigger the idea that he is courting her. But Andy is starting to have feelings for Arthur; she's just denying it because she's frightened that she will end up getting hurt again. But her mother, Beth, and Mang Ernie will persuade her to tell the truth. When Andy finally decides to confide her true identity, she will see Arthur and Arlene together, kissing each other.
| 26 | "Bittersweet Revelation" | November 12, 2012 | 1028 - BB |
| 27 | "Bittersweet Revelation" | November 13, 2012 | 1026 - Z |
| 28 | "Bittersweet Revelation" | November 14, 2012 | 1027 - AA |
| 29 | "Bittersweet Revelation" | November 15, 2012 | 1029 - CC |
| 30 | "Bittersweet Revelation" | November 16, 2012 | 1030 - DD |
In spite the presence of Arlene in his life, Arthur can't deny that his days aren't complete without Andy. Confusion strikes and Arthur starts to question his own sexuality. Meanwhile, Mamita will meet an accident and Arthur will be blamed. Arlene on the other hand, will discover that Andy is not a "he" but a "she".
| 31 | "The Last Sip" | November 19, 2012 | 1031 - EE |
| 32 | "The Last Sip" | November 20, 2012 | 1032 - FF |
| 33 | "The Last Sip" | November 21, 2012 | 1033 - GG |
| 34 | "The Last Sip" | November 22, 2012 | 1035 - II |
| 35 | "The Last Sip" | November 23, 2012 | 1034 - HH |
Arthur feels hurt and betrayed when he finds out the truth about Andy's real identity. Meanwhile, Andy decides to leave for Singapore and pursue her scholarship. Afraid of losing the girl he loves, Arthur stops her and forgives her. The drama ends with Arthur and Andy swearing eternal love for each other in front of their families and love ones.
