= Coffee Prince =

Coffee Prince may refer to:

- Coffee Prince (South Korean TV series), a 2007 South Korean drama.
- Coffee Prince (Philippine TV series), a 2012 Philippine remake series of the Korean drama.
