= Namsan Cable Car =

Aerial tramway in Seoul, South Korea

Coordinates: 37.5565908°N 126.9817857°E

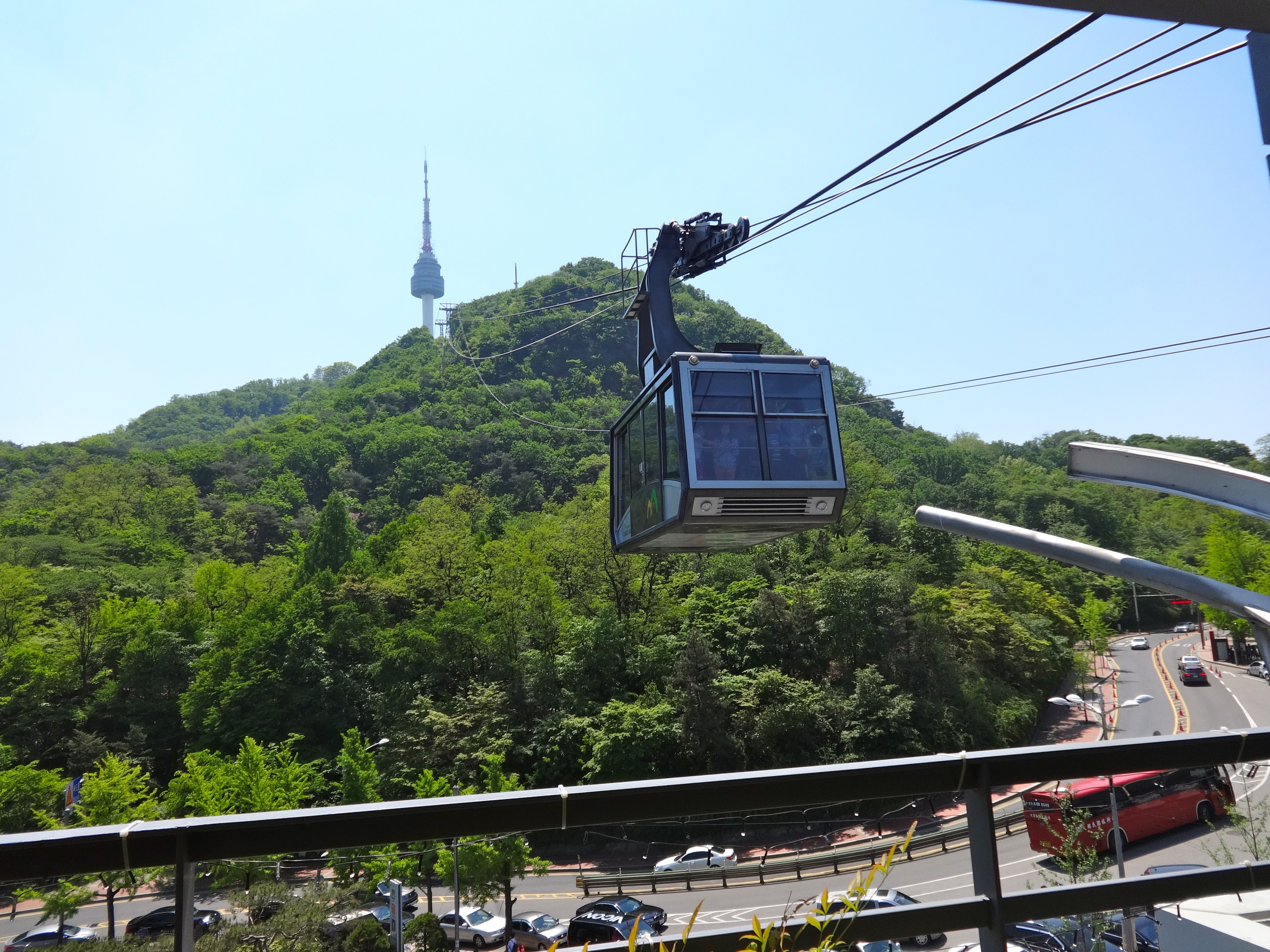
View of the cable car (2014)

The Namsan Cable Car (Korean: 남산 케이블카) is an aerial tramway in Seoul, South Korea. Built in 1962, it spans from the Hoehyeon-dong platform (near Myeong-dong) to the Yejang-dong platform near the top of the mountain Namsan and the Namsan Seoul Tower. It is the first commercial cable car service for passengers in Korea.

The length of the cable is 605 metres (1,985 ft), and the altitude difference of 138 metres (453 ft) makes a gradient of 13°. The cabins move at a speed of 3.2 metres per second (10 ft/s); the transit between platforms takes about three minutes.

An elevator, opened in June 2009 by the Seoul Metropolitan Government, operates from near the entrance of Namsan Tunnel Three up to the cable car station. It runs along the slope of Namsan with a capacity for 20 passengers to provide better access for the disabled and senior citizens.
