= Cartoon Street =

Decorated street in Seoul, South Korea

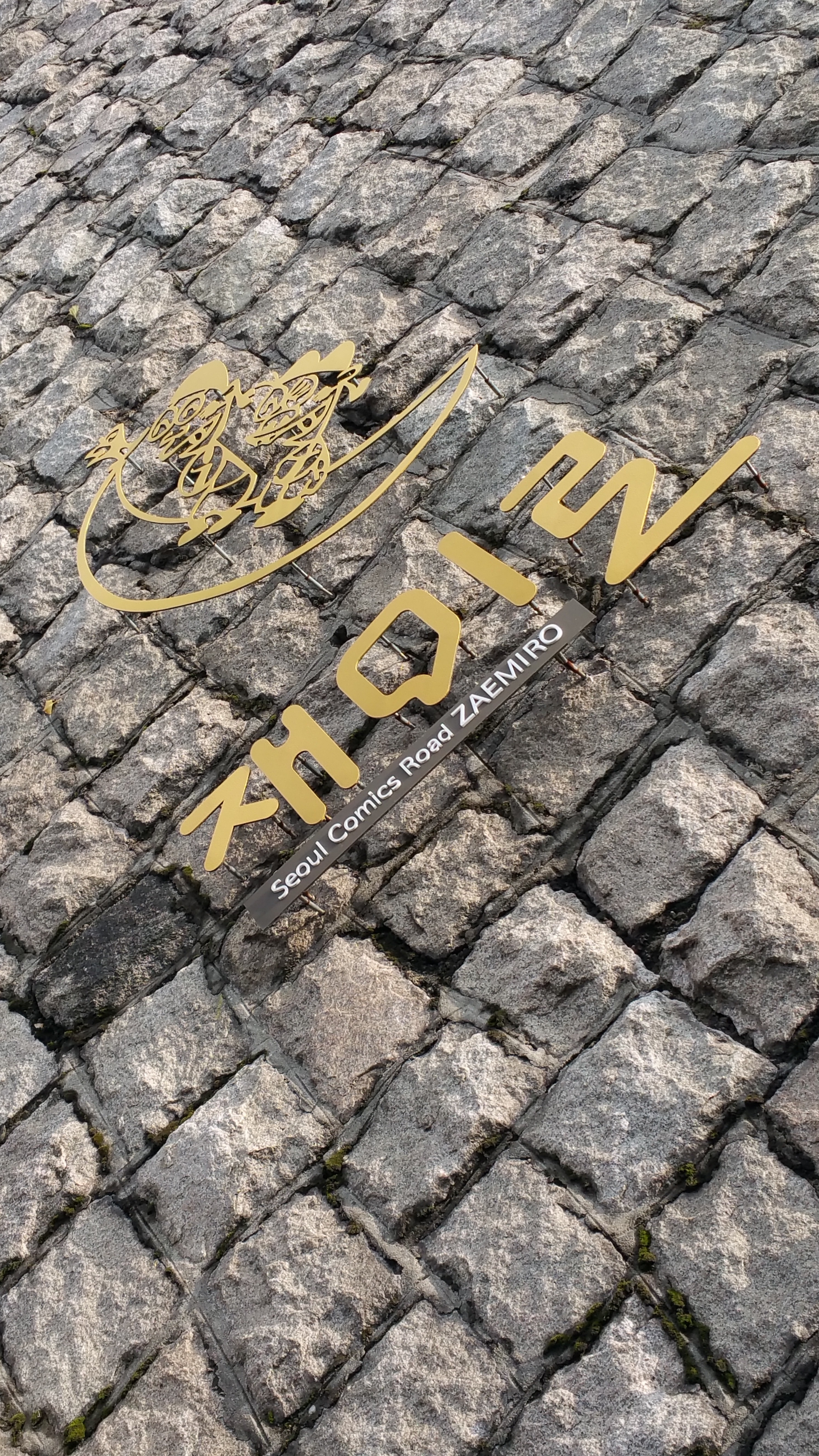
- Cartoon hill wall, November 2015.

Korean name
- Hangul: 카툰 거리
- RR: Katun geori
- MR: K'at'un kŏri

Zaemiro
- Hangul: 재미로
- Hanja: 재미路
- RR: Jaemiro
- MR: Chaemiro

Cartoon Street (Korean: 카툰 거리), also known as Zaemiro (Korean: 재미로), or the "street of fun," is a street in the central part of Seoul, South Korea, which extends 450-meters from Myeong-dong Station to the Seoul Animation Center on the hillside of Namsan. The area, created by the Seoul Metropolitan Government, is an open-air cartoon gallery of graffiti-like paintings, comics' quotes and short stories; with small parks and a multipurpose cultural hall.

== History and environs ==
Cartoon Street, "the street of manhwa", or Zaemiro, which is also spelled Jaemiro, was opened in December 2013 by Seoul's city government to promote the "imaginative industry" and boost tourism and the local economy.

The street connected Namsan Mountain and Myeong-dong, both busy tourist areas that welcomed approximately seven million tourists annually, but it had been overlooked for many years, having been used long ago during Japanese colonial rule (1910–1945), and was the area where the Korean CIA was founded in 1961. The Mount Namsan area had become increasingly popular with tourists who visited, then posted photos and videos on social media. On October 31, 2015, over 30,000 people visited during the Namsan Halloween Festival.

The major sights added to the .28-mile street include five small parks or manhwa culture stations: "Sangsang Park" in front of Exit 3 of Myeongdong Station; "Manhwa Samgeori" in front of the Pacific Hotel; "Sayeon Post Office" where artists displayed the stories of citizens on the walls of a public parking lot; "Jaemi Sports Ground" in a convenience store parking lot; and "Manhwa Hill" on Namsan Ongbyeok (retaining wall). Other new additions included a four-story building with galleries and shops for comics, and some 70 famous local cartoonists contributed their work to walls and buildings along the street. A Manhwa Neighborhood Meeting was held to include the opinions of locals, and both the name of the street "Jaemiro", and the name of the manhwa culture space, "Jaemirang" were selected from an SNS-based citizen competition and local votes.

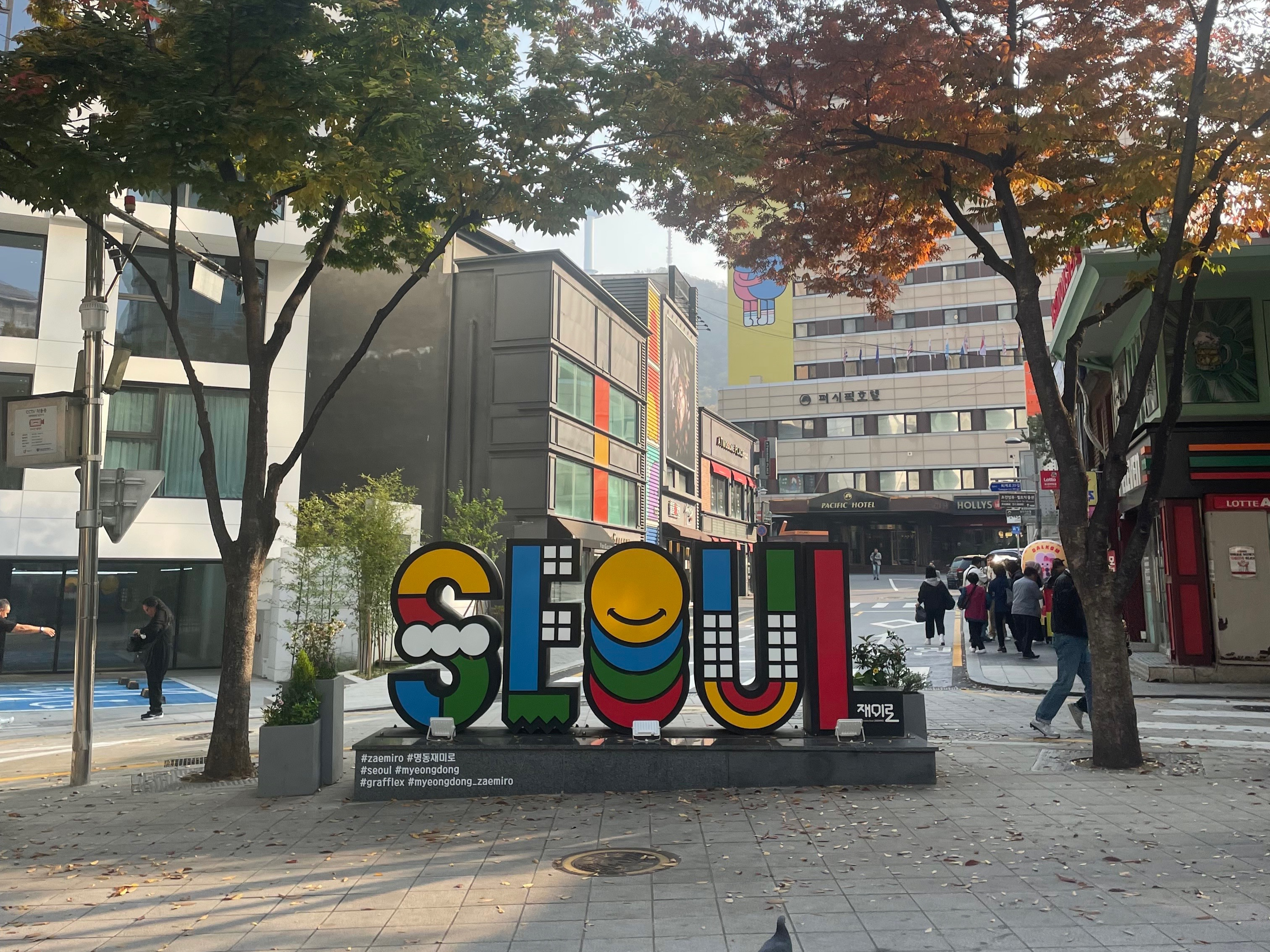
Welcome sign

== Street route ==
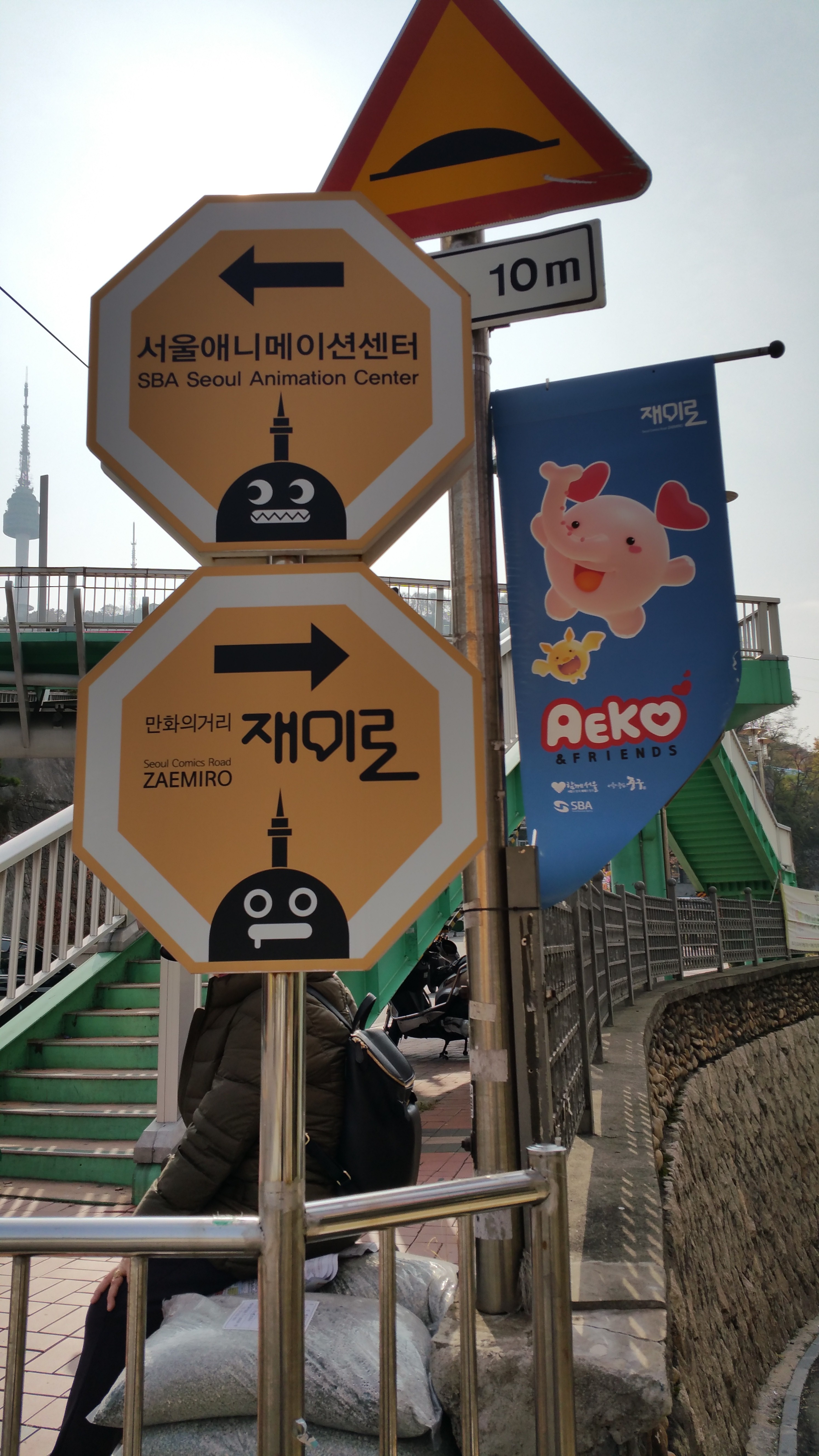
Cartoon Street and Seoul Animation Center street signs below N Seoul Tower, November 2015.

The entrance of the street begins as a tiny alley found between Exits 2 and 3 of Myeongdong Station, along subway line No. 4, at a fork in the road by the Pacific Hotel.

By 2015, the city had decorated the bus stop at Exit 3 of Myungdong Station, near the entrance to the street, with more than 32 images of Tayo the Little Bus, a character modeled after city buses. The "Tayo bus stop", along with "Tayo" city buses, was part of the "Public Transportation Day" commemoration on March 26, 2015.

Cartoons are found at the street's entrance, with the manhwa Tower of God by SIU and continuing uphill, include Run Hani's characters racing each other, Dooly the Little Dinosaur, and Spirited Away's Kaonashi. The street seems to cover Korea's manhwa history from the 1970s robot Jjibba, to the prince and princess featured in 2002's Goong or Princess Hours. Local shop owners and hotels also started adding artwork and Korean history to their storefronts.

=== Zaemirang culture center ===
The "Zaemirang" multicultural facility or "cartoon museum" was opened on December 19, 2013 and is located towards the middle of the street. The lower floors are cartoon culture spaces with sales and exhibitions, and resting places to read comics; the upper floor has writer working areas. The rooftop has a cartoon reading room and seating space on a heated floor, and the comics and webtoons range from "Taekwondo Kids Maruchi Arachi" which is popular among the older generations and "Run, Hani" popular with the younger generations.

In 2013, the first exhibition "A Visit To The Animation House" celebrated its opening and the history of present day webtoons and their authors such as Misaeng by Yoon Tae-ho, Bibimtoon by Hong Seung Woo, Along With the Gods (webtoon) by Ju Ho Min, and God of Bath by Ha Il-kwon.

In the first half of 2015, an exhibition was held there by the city government, the Seoul Business Agency (SBA) and the Seoul Animation Center, "Story Road, Seoul, Korea – Alleys," which detailed Seoul's alleys from the perspectives of cartoon artists and artists.

=== Webtoon workshop center ===
On February 1, 2016, the Seoul Metropolitan Government and the Seoul Business Agency opened a Webtoon Workshop Center or "Webtoon Gongjakso (photo)" on the street where people can create character figurines via 3-D printing. It also showcases character figurines and posters from Korean webtoons, such as The Sound of Heart and Noblesse, as well as DC Comics and Marvel Comics, such as Batman and Iron Man.

=== Cartoon hill across from Seoul Animation Center ===
The "cartoon hill" is near the end of the street, just before it opens in front of the Seoul Animation Center, and is Namsan's retaining wall illuminated with popular Korean cartoon characters from 40 artists, including Lee Hyun-se, Huh Young-man and Hwang Mi-na.

== Festivals, exhibits and special events ==
The street is host to many events. In February 2014, individual cartoonists were invited every Saturday to Zaemirang to spend time with their fans and draw pictures while a "Cartoon Concert" of indie bands performed. The "Cartoon Street Festival" in November 2014 featured cartoon stories, a costume play photo tour of cartoon clubs, and Korean traditional dress and games.

== See also ==
- Seoul Animation Center
- Seoul International Cartoon and Animation Festival
