= List of Kapag Nahati ang Puso episodes =

Kapag Nahati ang Puso (transl. When the Heart is Split) is a 2018 Philippine television drama series starring Bea Binene, Sunshine Cruz and Benjamin Alves. The series premiered on GMA Network's noontime block and worldwide on GMA Pinoy TV from July 16 to November 2, 2018, replacing My Guitar Princess.

NUTAM (Nationwide Urban Television Audience Measurement) People in Television Homes ratings are provided by AGB Nielsen Philippines.

== Series overview ==
Season	Episodes	Originally released	
Season	Episodes	First released	Last released
1	80	July 16, 2018	November 2, 2018

== List of Episodes ==
=== July 2018 ===
Episode		Original air date	Social media hashtag	AGB Nielsen NUTAM People in Television Homes			Ref.
Episode		Original air date	Social media hashtag	Rating	Timeslot rank	Whole day rank	Ref.
1	"Pilot"	July 16, 2018	#KapagNahatiAngPuso	4.5%	#2		
2	"Buntis" (Pregnant)	July 17, 2018	#KNAPBuntis	4.7%	#2		
3	"Kasal Sakal" (Wedding Choke)	July 18, 2018	#KNAPKasalSakal	5.0%	#2		
4	"Galit ni Miranda" (Miranda's Anger)	July 19, 2018	#KNAPGalitNiMiranda	5.4%	#2		
5	"Mag-ina Magkahiwalay" (Mother-Daughter Separated)	July 20, 2018	#KNAPMagInaMagkahiwalay	6.2%	#1	#16	
6	"Away Mag-asawa" (Spouses Fight)	July 23, 2018	#KNAPAwayMagAsawa	5.2%	#2	#18	
7	"Kawawang Claire" (Poor Claire)	July 24, 2018	#KNAPKawawangClaire	5.0%	#2		
8	"Claire Meets Joaquin"	July 25, 2018	#KNAPClaireMeetsJoaquin	4.8%	#2		
9	"Rio Meets Claire"	July 26, 2018	#KNAPRioMeetsClaire	4.6%	#2		
10	"Muling Pagkikita" (Meeting Again)	July 27, 2018	#KNAPMulingPagkikita	5.9%	#2	#16	
11	"Suspetya" (Suspect)	July 30, 2018	#KNAPSuspetya	5.0%	#2		
12	"Claire Viral Video"	July 31, 2018	#KNAPClaireViralVideo	5.1%	#1	#15	
Average				4.7%			

=== August 2018 ===
Episode		Original air date	Social media hashtag	AGB Nielsen NUTAM People in Television Homes			Ref.
Episode		Original air date	Social media hashtag	Rating	Timeslot rank	Whole day rank	Ref.
13	"Lukso ng Dugo" (Leap of Blood)	August 1, 2018	#KNAPLuksoNgDugo	4.5%	#2	#19	
14	"Joaquin to the Rescue"	August 2, 2018	#KNAPJoaquinToTheRescue	5.0%	#1	#16	
15	"Rio, Sugod, Miranda" (Rio, Dash, Miranda)	August 3, 2018	#KNAPRioSugodMiranda	5.2%	#1	#17	
16	"Pagtatagpo" (Encounter)	August 6, 2018	#KNAPPagtatagpo	4.5%	#2	#19	
17	"Sikreto ni Nico" (Nico's Secret)	August 7, 2018	#KNAPSikretoNiNico	4.6%	#1	#16	
18	"Close Tayo" (We're Close)	August 8, 2018	#KNAPCloseTayo	4.7%	#1	#17	
19	"Rebelasyon ni Rio" (Rio's Revelation)	August 9, 2018	#KNAPRebelasyonNiRio	5.1%	#2	#19	
20	"Kuyog" (Horde)	August 10, 2018	#KNAPKuyog	5.0%	#2	#20	
21	"Konsensya" (Conscience)	August 13, 2018	#KNAPKonsensya	4.9%	#2	#19	
22	"Pagbubunyag" (Revelation)	August 14, 2018	#KNAPPagbubunyag	5.1%	#2	#18	
23	"Sinungaling Ka, Miranda" (You're Lying, Miranda)	August 15, 2018	#KNAPSinungalingKaMiranda	4.3%	#2	#19	
24	"Alipusta" (Insult)	August 16, 2018	#KNAPAlipusta	4.5%	#2	#20	
25	"Pagtatapat ni Nico" (Nico's Confession)	August 17, 2018	#KNAPPagtatapatNiNico	5.1%	#2	#16	
26	"Agawan" (Rivalry)	August 20, 2018	#KNAPAgawan	6.4%	#1	#15	
27	"Hiwalayan" (Separation)	August 21, 2018	#KNAPHiwalayan	6.5%	#1	#14	
28	"Lumayas Ka, Miranda" (Get Out, Miranda)	August 22, 2018	#KNAPLumayasKaMiranda	4.9%	#2	#18	
29	"Second Chance"	August 23, 2018	#KNAPSecondChance	4.7%	#2	#21	
30	"Bangayang Rio at Miranda" (Wrangle Between Rio and Miranda)	August 24, 2018	#KNAPBangayangRioMiranda	4.9%	#2	#18	
31	"Break na Tayo" (We're Breaking Up)	August 27, 2018	#KNAPBreakNaTayo	4.7%	#2	#21	
32	"Kakampi o Kaaway?" (Ally or Enemy?)	August 28, 2018	#KNAPKakampiOKaaway	4.6%	#1	#20	
33	"Espiya" (Spy)	August 29, 2018	#KNAPEspiya	4.6%	#2	#18	
34	"Joaquin vs. Zach"	August 30, 2018	#KNAPJoaquinVsZach	4.5%	#2	#20	
35	"Triple Selosan" (Triple Enviousness)	August 31, 2018	#KNAPTripleSelosan	4.1%	#2	#21	
Average				4.9%			

=== September 2018 ===
Episode		Original air date	Social media hashtag	AGB Nielsen NUTAM People in Television Homes			Ref.
Episode		Original air date	Social media hashtag	Rating	Timeslot rank	Whole day rank	Ref.
36	"Jewel of Jeimur"	September 3, 2018	#KNAPJewelOfJeimur	5.6%	#1	#15	
37	"Magnanakaw" (Thief)	September 4, 2018	#KNAPMagnanakaw	5.4%	#2		
38	"Traydor" (Traitor)	September 5, 2018	#KNAPTraydor	4.2%	#2	#19	
39	"Sugod" (Dash)	September 6, 2018	#KNAPSugod	4.8%	#1	#19	
40	"Oplan Nakaw" (Theft Plan)	September 7, 2018	#KNAPOplanNakaw	4.3%	#2	#21	
41	"Claire Saksi" (Claire Witness)	September 10, 2018	#KNAPClaireSaksi	4.3%	#2	#21	
42	"Panganib" (Danger)	September 11, 2018	#KNAPPanganib	4.9%	#2	#19	
43	"Agaw Buhay" (Dying)	September 12, 2018	#KNAPAgawBuhay	4.7%	#2	#19	
44	"Pasabog na Rebelasyon" (Explosive Revelation)	September 13, 2018	#KNAPPasabogNaRebelasyon	5.7%	#2	#17	
45	"Banta kay Claire" (Threat by Claire)	September 14, 2018	#KNAPBantaKayClaire	5.5%	#2	#18	
46	"46th Episode"	September 17, 2018	#KapagNahatiAngPuso	4.5%	#2	#20	
47	"Elevator Scandal"	September 18, 2018	#KNAPElevatorScandal	4.5%	#2	#21	
48	"Evil Plan"	September 19, 2018	#KNAPEvilPlan	4.5%	#1	#18	
49	"Anak ni Rio" (Rio's Daughter)	September 20, 2018	#KNAPAnakNiRio	4.5%	#2	#20	
50	"Patibong" (Trap)	September 21, 2018	#KNAPPatibong	4.4%	#2	#21	
51	"Claire Kinaladkad" (Claire Dragged)	September 24, 2018	#KNAPClaireKinaladkad	4.1%	#2	#18	
52	"Bistado" (Seen)	September 25, 2018	#KNAPBistado	4.4%	#2	#19	
53	"Karma ni Miranda" (Miranda's Karma)	September 26, 2018	#KNAPKarmaNiMiranda	4.6%	#1		
54	"Anak Ko si Claire" (Claire is My Daughter)	September 27, 2018	#KNAPAnakKoSiClaire	5.1%	#2	#16	
55	"Parusa Kay Miranda" (Miranda's Punishment)	September 28, 2018	#KNAPParusaKayMiranda	5.3%	#2	#13	
Average				4.8%			

=== October 2018 ===
Episode		Original air date	Social media hashtag	AGB Nielsen NUTAM People in Television Homes			Ref.
Episode		Original air date	Social media hashtag	Rating	Timeslot rank	Whole day rank	Ref.
56	"Huli Ka, Claire" (I Caught You, Claire)	October 1, 2018	#KNAPHuliKaClaire	4.7%	#1		
57	"Sugod Bahay" (House Dash)	October 2, 2018	#KNAPSugodBahay	4.5%	#2		
58	"Habulin si Claire" (Catch Claire)	October 3, 2018	#KNAPHabulinSiClaire	4.4%	#2		
59	"Sindak" (Fear)	October 4, 2018	#KNAPSindak	5.0%	#1		
60	"Patayin si Rio" (Kill Rio)	October 5, 2018	#KNAPPatayinSiRio	5.1%	#1		
61	"Walang Atrasan" (No Turning Back)	October 8, 2018	#KNAPWalangAtrasan	4.9%	#2		
62	"Akyat Bahay" (Housebreaker)	October 9, 2018	#KNAPAkyatBahay	4.5%	#2		
63	"Buhay si Claire" (Claire is Alive)	October 10, 2018	#KNAPBuhaySiClaire	5.2%	#1		
64	"Last Kiss"	October 11, 2018	#KNAPLastKiss	5.0%	#2		
65	"Paghaharap" (Confrontation)	October 12, 2018	#KNAPPaghaharap	4.7%	#2		
66	"Pagtatapat" (Adduction)	October 15, 2018	#KNAPPagtatapat	4.6%	#2		
67	"Pagsasama" (Integration)	October 16, 2018	#KNAPPagsasama	4.0%	#2		
68	"Panghihinayang" (Regret)	October 17, 2018	#KNAPPanghihinayang	4.5%	#2		
69	"Sino ang Mas Mahal Mo?" (Who Do You Love More?)	October 18, 2018	#KNAPSinoAngMasMahalMo	4.7%	#1		
70	"Karibal" (Rival)	October 19, 2018	#KNAPKaribal	4.7%	#1		
71	"Ina Laban sa Anak" (Mother Against Daughter)	October 22, 2018	#KNAPInaLabanSaAnak	5.7%	#1		
72	"Kapahamakan" (Disaster)	October 23, 2018	#KNAPKapahamakan	6.5%	#1		
73	"Ang Ina ni Claire" (Claire's Mother)	October 24, 2018	#KNAPAngInaNiClaire	6.6%	#1		
74	"Traydor" (Traitor)	October 25, 2018	#KNAPTraydor	6.4%	#1		
75	"Pagliligtas" (Saving)	October 26, 2018	#KNAPPagliligtas	6.9%	#1		
76	"Sagad sa Buto" (Most of the Bones)	October 29, 2018	#KNAPSagadSaButo	6.2%	#1		
77	"Ina-Anak Magkaribal" (Mother-Daughter Rivalry)	October 30, 2018	#KNAPInaAnakMagkaribal	7.1%	#1	#14	
78	"Mag-inang Palaban" (Fighting Mother and Daughter)	October 31, 2018	#KNAPMagInangPalaban	7.0%	#1		
Average				5.3%			

=== November 2018 ===
Episode		Original air date	Social media hashtag	AGB Nielsen NUTAM People in Television Homes			Ref.
Episode		Original air date	Social media hashtag	Rating	Timeslot rank	Whole day rank	Ref.
79	"Wedding Gown"	November 1, 2018	#KNAPWeddingGown	6.2%	#1		
80	"Intense Finale"	November 2, 2018	#KNAPIntenseFinale	7.0%	#1		
Average				6.6%			
