= Seoul Animation Center =

Museum in Seoul, South Korea

Coordinates: 37.559°N 126.983°E

Seoul Animation Center 서울 애니메이션 센터
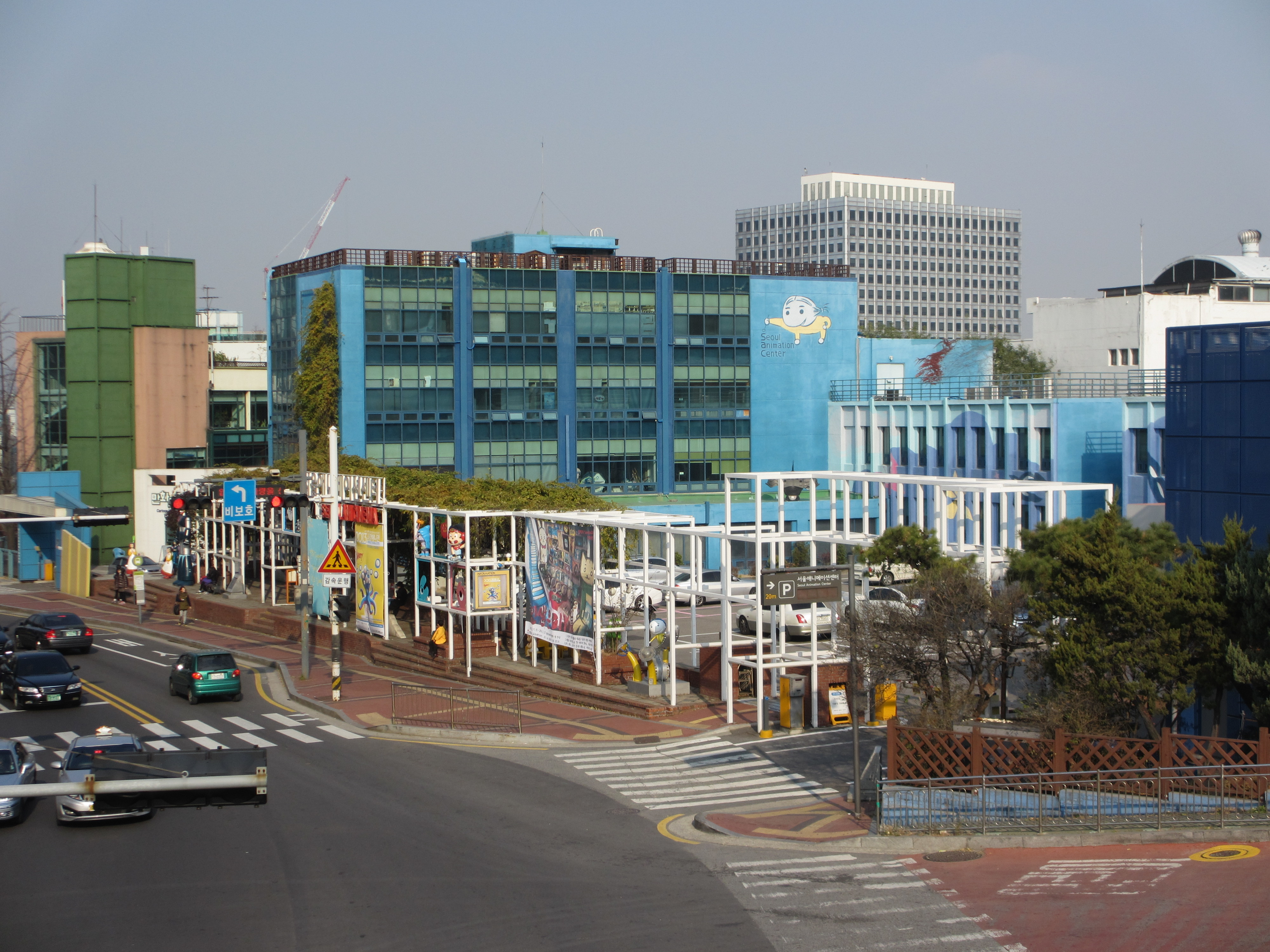
- Seoul Animation Center in Seoul
- Native name: 서울 애니메이션 센터
- Founded: May 1999; 27 years ago Seoul, South Korea
- Defunct: March 31, 2024
- Headquarters: 126 Soparo (8-145) Sopa-ro Jung-gu, Seoul, South Korea
- Services: Movie theater, museum, library, exhibitions, experiential education
- Website: www.ani.seoul.kr/eng/

The Seoul Animation Center (Korean: 서울 애니메이션 센터) was an animation and cartoon museum and activities center located in Jung District, Seoul, South Korea. It closed in 2024.

It was established by the Seoul Metropolitan Government in May 1999 to support the South Korean comics and animation industry and later expanded to include games and characters. It is operated and managed by the Seoul Business Agency (SBA) and jointly hosts the Seoul International Cartoon and Animation Festival (SICAF), and other art exhibits and festivals at the center and on nearby Cartoon Street.

== History and location ==
The center, established in May 1999, is located in Yejang-dong on the northern edge of Namsan Mountain, and occupies four separate buildings which were constructed in 1962. It hosts exhibitions, education programmes and festivals and receives more than 250,000 visitors every year.

The surrounding neighborhood was developed during the Japanese colonial era and housed the Korean Central Intelligence Agency, which formed in 1961, with their interrogation section in one of the center's buildings. The area has been dubbed ‘Animation Town’, and includes Cartoon Street, which entrance is directly across the street from the center The center is an approximate ten minute walk to Myeong-dong Station, downhill along Cartoon Street; with Soongeui Women's College and Namsan's cable car and walking courses nearby, up the mountain.

The center is managed by the Seoul Business Agency (SBA), which is affiliated with the city government, and provides support to small and medium-sized venture companies. In addition to its own activities, the center partners with SICAF as host for their film festival, and holds events on Cartoon Street, like the 2014 Cartoon Street Festival which featured art and Korean cultural experiences.

== Facilities ==
Facilities inside the complex, which is decorated with colourful murals of cartoon characters, include a library, cinema and exhibition hall. The entrance courtyard has cartoon character statues, among them the popular Larva (TV series), Pororo, and Robot Taekwon V, with Dooly the Little Dinosaur and Pucca inside. The center hosts exhibitions and experience-based programs that focus on characters from domestic manhwa and animations. The rooftop garden was featured as the house of Choi Han-kyul, played by cast member Gong Yoo, in the Korean drama, Coffee Prince.

=== Cartoon museum and library ===
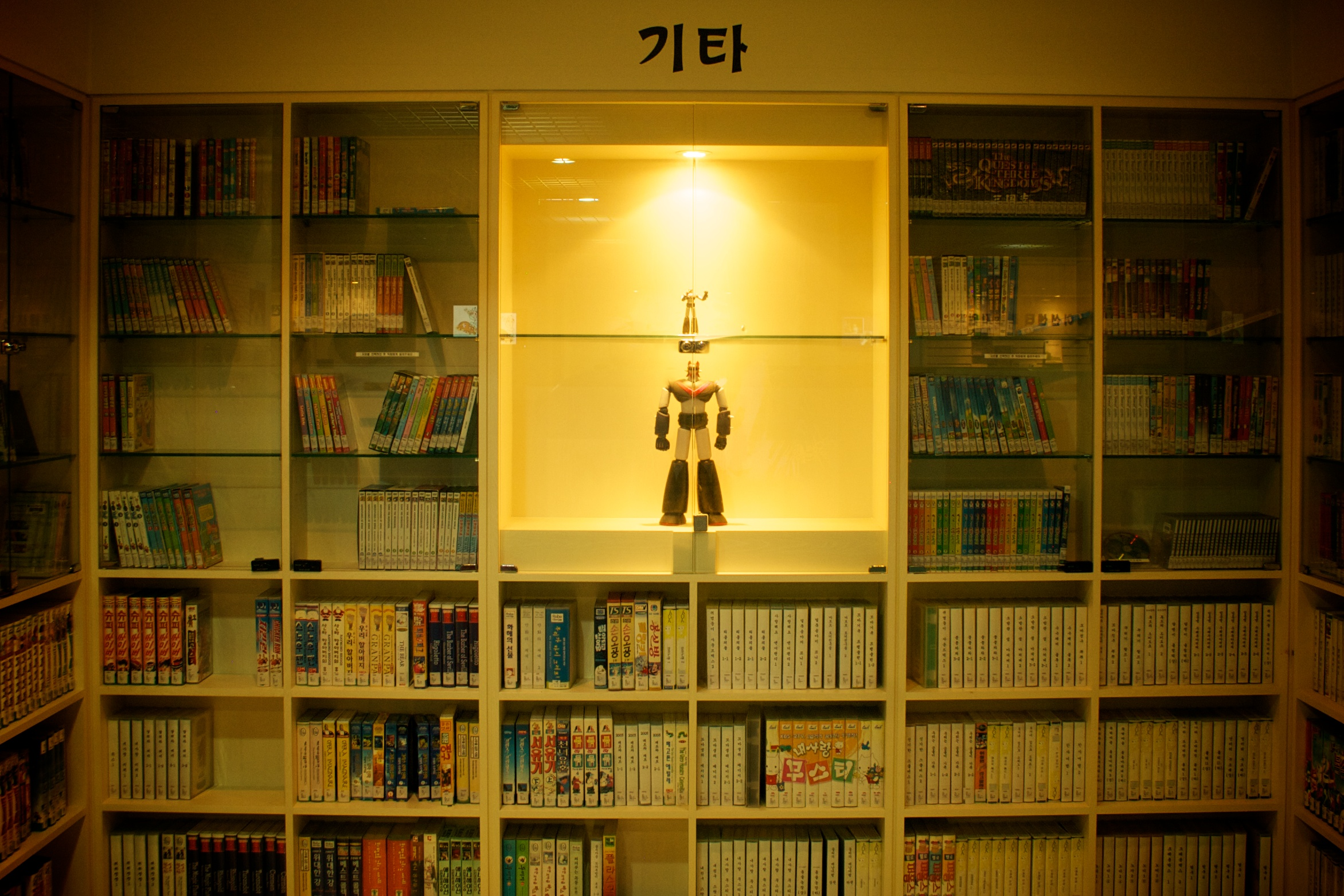
Library, March 2011.

The Cartoon Museum or 'House of Cartoon' was built in 2002 to expand holdings of Korean comics. The three-story building includes exhibits, three dimensional artwork, and a library of over 56,000 items, including 48,000 comic books and 8,000 animation videos; and holds performances and magic shows.

The library is a lending library with comic books on the first floor, and exhibits, individual viewing screens and a mini-theater on the second floor. The collection includes Korean cartoon trends from the 1970s through the 2000s. The interior has trompe-l'œil or "trick art" featured on restroom walls. Manager Park Kyoung-jin, part of the Ani-Town Team at the Seoul Business Agency, said in 2014, "Since we started stocking Korean comic books in foreign languages, series that have already been exported, we’ve seen a growing number of foreign tourists."

=== Seoul Ani-Cinema ===
The 179-seat Seoul Ani-Cinema opened on January 19, 2005, and was the first theater in Korea exclusively used for animation. It holds solo domestic and international film screenings and provides support for other international animation film festivals, conferences, previews and seminars.

In 2005, the cinema starting hosting the Korean Independent Animation Film Festival (Indie-AniFest), which is organized by the Korean Independent Animation Filmmakers Association, with cash prizes and awards for adult and student divisions. Some of the winners placed well in international competitions, such as in 2014, Joung Yumi’s Love Games at Animafest Zagreb, and Jeong Dahee’s Man on the Chair at Annecy International Animated Film Festival.

The cinema, also, started hosting films for the yearly SICAF festival as early as 2007. In December 2007, they hosted a seminar to help improve the environment of the Korean broadcasting market, "Seminar on Successful Cases of Korean Animation in Foreign Markets and on Plans to Improve the Korean Broadcasting Market". In July 2009, they helped screen free films for the "Korea Ani Marathon" festival hosted by KOCCA and KOFA to provide a platform for some 300 short animations made in Korea every year. At the 18th event in 2014, 362 films from 43 countries were screened at the cinema and other theaters in Myeong-dong.

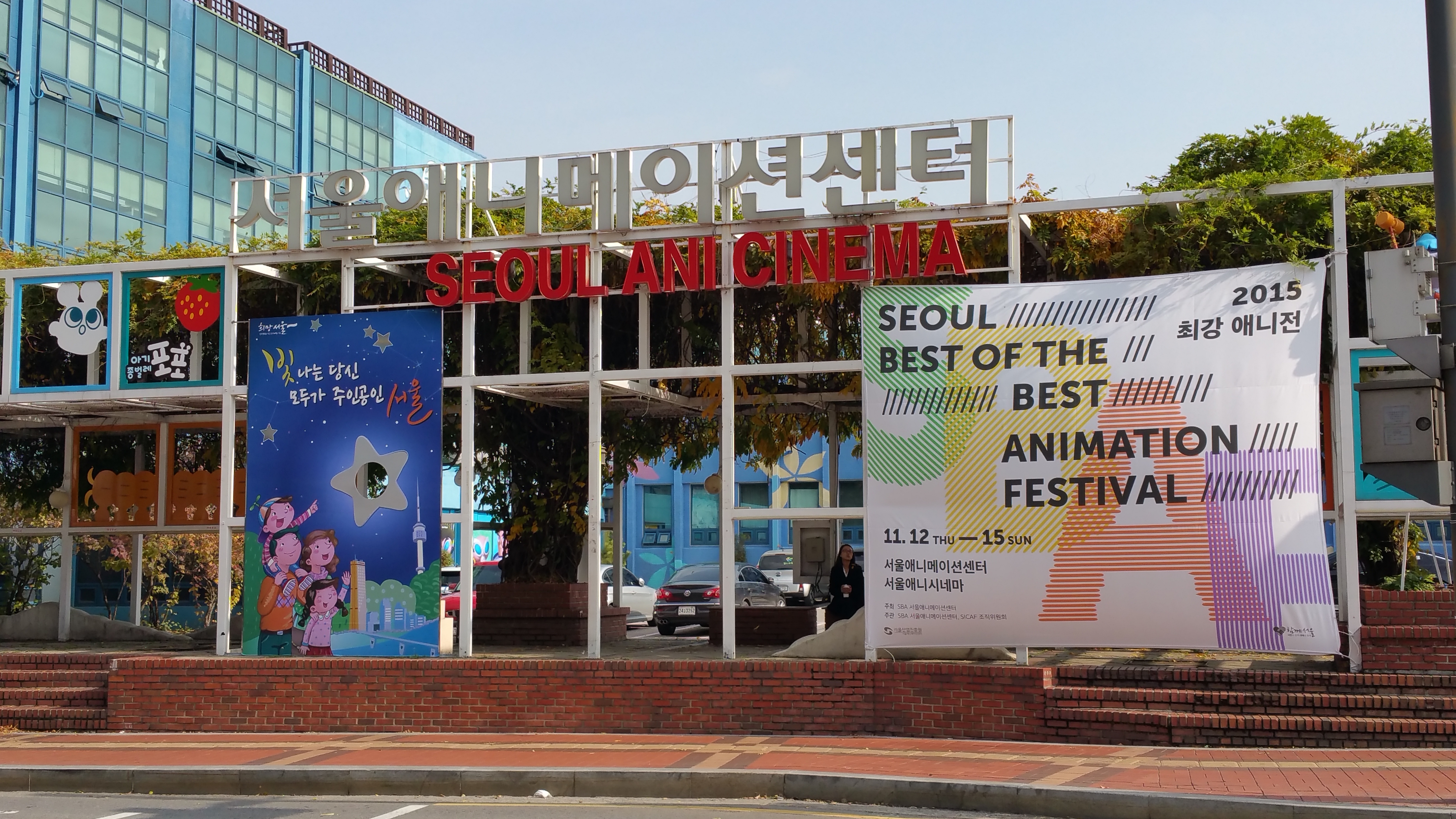
Seoul Ani-Cinema, November 2015

Screenings at the cinema include the inaugural film Hammerboy, shown on opening day in 2005. Others screened in early years were: New Royal Secret Commissioner, Empress Chung, and Olympus Guardian in 2005; Robot Taekwon V (digital), Shark Bait, and Hello Francesca (animated), in 2006; Jang Geum's Dream in 2007; The Tale of Pumpkins, Colin the Unbeatable, The White Seal, Life Is Cool, A Millennium Giraffe, There She Is!!, Donkey Xote, Raw Invader, What's Up?, and Love Is Protein in 2008.

=== Exhibition and character experience halls, educational facilities ===
The exhibition halls hold special exhibitions on multiple themes related to cartoons, animations and games. The Theme & Special Exhibition Hall has a lobby gallery and individual spaces. The Character Experience Pavilion holds exhibitions, conferences, education seminars, and has display rooms for animation experiences using clay animation, stop motion animation, and characters. Educational training is held in content and digital labs for children and adults, including design and writing classes and use of digital image production equipment.

=== Plans for new center ===
In August 2016, the Seoul Metropolitan Government opened the Seoul Animation Center Design Competition with plans for a new center to be built.

== See also ==
- Cartoon Street
- Seoul International Cartoon and Animation Festival
