= Guni-Guni =

- Guni-Guni promotional poster
- Directed by: Tara Illenberger
- Written by: Tara Illenberger
- Starring: Lovi Poe; Benjamin Alves; Empress Schuck
- Cinematography: A. B. Garcia
- Edited by: Fiona Borres
- Music by: Ron Francisco; Czandro Pollack
- Production company: Regal Films Regal Entertainment
- Distributed by: Regal Entertainment GMA Network for Philippine TV preimere
- Release date: August 22, 2012
- Country: Philippines
- Languages: Filipino; English

Guni-Guni (translation: "hallucination") is a 2012 Filipino psychological-horror-medical thriller film under Regal Entertainment. It stars Lovi Poe and Benjamin Alves. The film is directed by Tara Illenberger. The film was distributed by GMA Network.

== Plot ==
Thirty years ago, an unborn child was buried in the garden of what is now a boardinghouse in Cubao. It lies beneath the ground, unbeknownst to the tenants who live there. One of the tenants is Mylene who appears like the perfect girl, nice, pretty and at the top of her medicine class. But nobody knows about her past, not even the man who loves her most, Paolo. Paolo doesn't know anything about Mylene's family, her long, lost sibling or her estranged, nervous wreck of a mother. Nor does he know about the very long scar that runs across Mylene's body, nor of how incomplete she always feels. And he finds that the more he tries to win back her love, the more she retreats to her secret world that nobody could enter.

One day Mylene is asked to perform an abortion for a fee, she feels conflicted about doing what is right and at the same time, being in dire need of tuition fee. Her decision ultimately leads to a dark outcome and awakens a force that has laid quiet for years in the boardinghouse grounds. Thereafter, she becomes tormented by nightmares of a dark twin, whose presence gets stronger as days pass, as strange things start to happen in the house. When one by one, the boarders die of unexplainable causes, Joanna the resident psychic and Mylene's best friend struggles to understand the impending danger that she senses and decides to get to the bottom of the mystery; and as it unravels, they find themselves confronted by an angry soul that seeks justice.

== Cast ==
- Lovi Poe portrays dual roles:
  - Mylene Castillo, a medical student who has a dark secret despite having an orderly and kind demeanor.
  - Myra Castillo, the dark twin soul of Mylene who seeks revenge after being deprived of life.
- Benjamin Alves as Paolo Lopez, Mylene's boyfriend who cheated on her but repents and tries to know his beloved back.
- Empress Schuck as Mylene's best friend Joanna, a co-tenant and blockmate who has a third eye and can see dead people.
- Isay Alvarez as Teresa Castillo a lonely, desolate, wealthy (formerly) widow who longs for her daughters and husband.
- Gina Alajar as Mrs. Arevalo, an alcoholic woman waiting for her dead son who committed suicide. Her depression caused her to see souls particularly that of his son which brought her to her demise.
- Jaime Fabregas as Tatay Nanding, the gardener and caretaker of the boarding house who has Alzheimer's disease and longs for his sons, one who he appeases with raw meats in the garden (probably with his young dead son buried there), and Angelo.
- James Blanco as Angelo, Tatay Nanding's estranged son and Gerald's half-brother who was then haunted by faintest doppelgänger of his brother and father.
- Ria Garcia as Alicia, a pregnant boarder who triggers a lot of unfortunate events.
- Neil Ryan Sese as Eddie, a salesman and a widower still coping with his wife's mysterious death. He works as a medical representative, always on the road, taking work-related trips.
- Gerald Pesigan as Jay-Jay, autistic son of Eddie who plays with the ghost of Nanding's son.
- Julia Clarete as Vangie, Jay-jay's aunt/yaya and a tenant who possesses a negative outlook and leverage in life. As the movie progresses, secrets start to unfold as it is revealed that Vangie murdered her own sister, in order to win Eddie. In return, she was haunted to death by her crime.
- Ces Quesada as Nanding's wife who later comes back after the latter became stroked and brings harnessed mood to the setting.
- Guji Lorenzana as Javier, the son of Mrs. Arevalo who peculiarly committed suicide and continues to haunt his mom for justice.
- Chinggoy Alonzo as Professor, the doctor who taught and advises Joanna, Paolo, and Mylene about the dilemma of conjoined twins.
- Kris Bernal as Shirley
- Angeli Nicole Sanoy as Hazel

== Production ==
The film was first announced by Regal Entertainment on March 30, 2012, along with 11 other films they are going to release this year. Originally, the lead role was offered to Jennylyn Mercado but she turned down the role due to her busy schedule, making another Regal Film and a drama series under GMA Network. Roselle Monteverde, President of Regal Entertainment confirmed on May 23 that the role was already given to actress, Lovi Poe. The new GMA 7's contract artist Benjamin Alves signed for the lead man role making the film his first lead role in a movie outfit. The film began shooting on May 28, 2012. The movie was distributed by GMA Network.

== Marketing and promotions ==
The promotional photo of Guni-Guni was first released on July 20 with Lovi Poe in a sepia shot carrying the title of the film. On July 25, the theatrical poster of the film was released online featuring Lovi Poe in a dual personality. The photos were taken in Pioneer Studio in Mandaluyong. The official trailer was released in the official YouTube channel of Regal Films on July 29, 2012. The film had their premiere night on August 20, 2012, at the SM Megamall. It was also distributed by GMA Pictures.

== See also ==
- Alone
- List of ghost films
