= Hasset Go =

Filipino celebrity chef (1986–2015)

- Born: Pahar Go Pangcoga; August 8, 1986; Oroquieta, Misamis Occidental
- Died: October 24, 2015 (aged 29); Manila, Philippines
- Culinary career
- Previous restaurant(s): Cosmopolitan Cuisine Medchef
- Television shows: Kapuso Mo, Jessica Soho (2013–2015); Unang Hirit (2011-2015)

Pahar Go Pangcoga, popularly known as Hasset Go or Chef Hasset (August 8, 1986 – October 24, 2015) was a Filipino celebrity chef and entrepreneur. He appeared in several television shows and gained prominence nationwide.

== Personal life ==
Go was born on August 8, 1986, in Oroquieta, Misamis Occidental. He was the second child. His siblings were Hisham and Rowden. His parents separated when he was young and decided to help his mother in their pastry business. After finishing high school, he took a crash course on baking with Chef Heny Sison and became the youngest Filipino pastry chef at age 18. Go travelled back to Manila to work as assistant pastry chef at Chef Ed Quimpo's Cosmopolitan Cuisine restaurant. After a few years, he managed to set up his own cake shop called Medchef. He then became involved in promoting local Filipino pastries with the Department of Tourism. He was also an active youth advocate inspiring young provincianos to become entrepreneurs.

== Death ==
Go died from liver cancer on October 24, 2015, in Manila, Philippines. His brother Rowden died from the same illness on June 11, 2014, before Hasset died.
And then later on, 2 years after his death, his younger brother Hisham, the youngest among the Go brothers, also died from Stage 4 liver cancer on November 14, 2017.

His life story was featured in Magpakailanman, aired on December 3, 2016, and Benjamin Alves portrayed the role of Go.

== See also ==
- GMA Network
