= Namchang-dong =

Neighbourhood in Seoul, South Korea

- Country: South Korea

Korean name
- Hangul: 남창동
- Hanja: 南倉洞
- RR: Namchang-dong
- MR: Namch'ang-dong

Namchang-dong (Korean: 남창동) is a legal dong (neighbourhood) of Jung District, Seoul, South Korea. It is governed by its administrative dong, Hoehyeon-dong.

== See also ==
- Administrative divisions of South Korea
