= Hoehyeon-dong =

Neighborhood in Seoul, South Korea

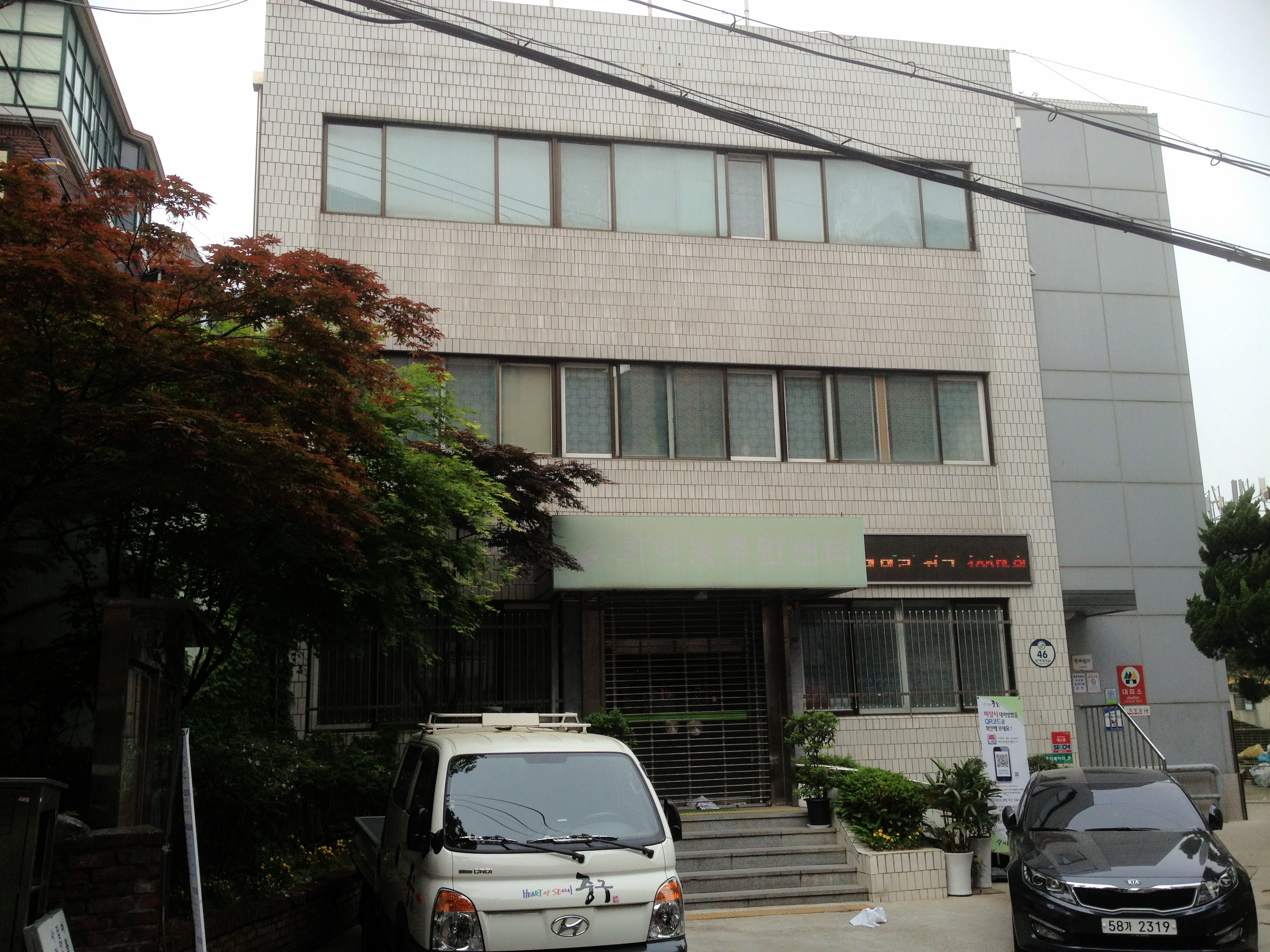
- Toegye-ro street around Hoehyeon subway station. Hoehyeon-dong Resident Office

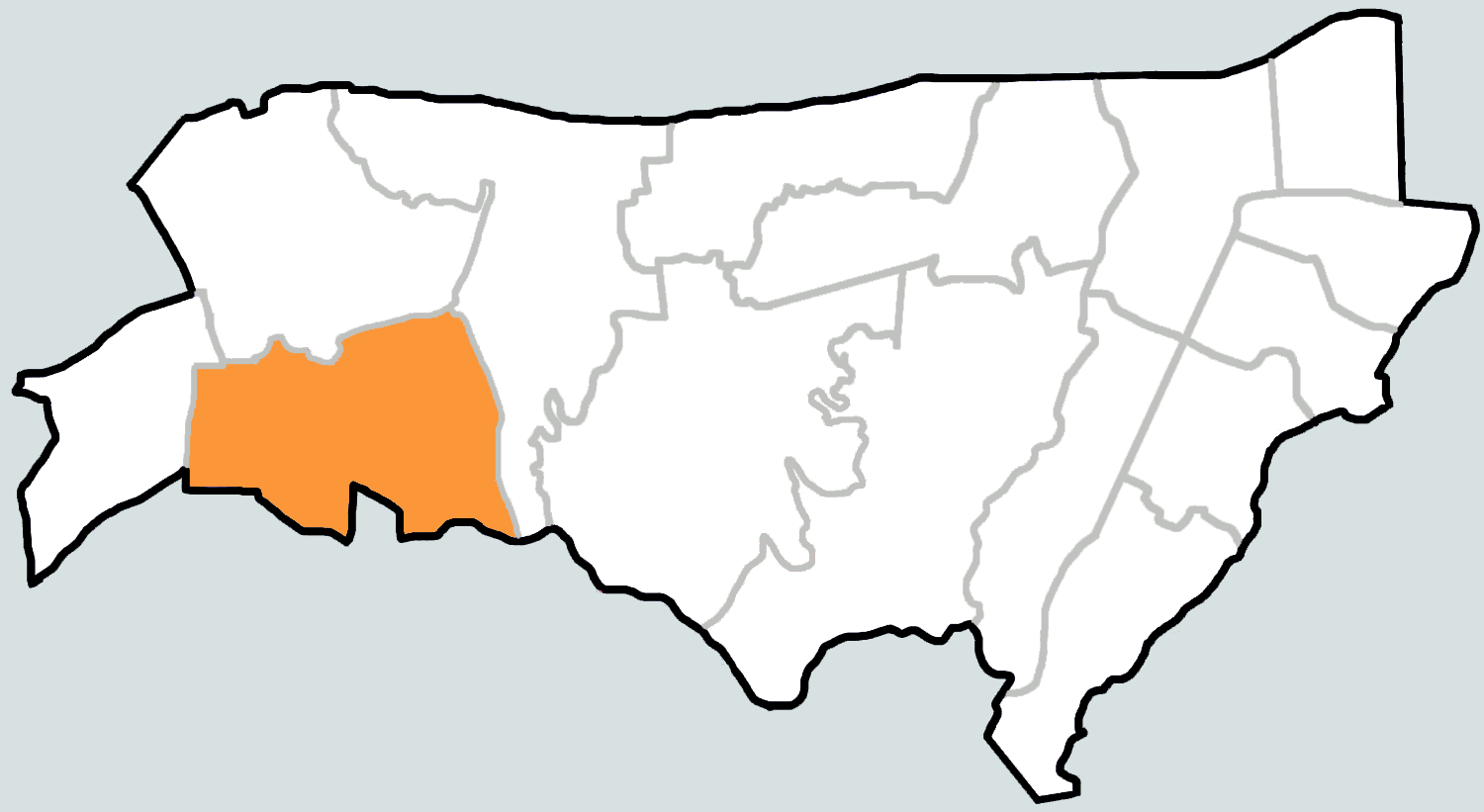
- Coordinates: 37.558°N 126.978°E
- Country: South Korea

Area
  - Total: 0.84 km^{2} (0.32 sq mi)

Population (2013)
  - Total: 5,905
  - Density: 7,000/km^{2} (18,000/sq mi)

Korean name
- Hangul: 회현동
- Hanja: 會賢洞
- RR: Hoehyeon-dong
- MR: Hoehyŏn-dong

Hoehyeon-dong (Korean: 회현동) is a dong (neighborhood) of Jung District, Seoul, South Korea.

== Etymology ==
The name of Hoehyeon-dong is derived from the fact that 'wise people gathered a lot in this area' (會賢), and it was also referred to as 'Hoehyeon' or 'Hoedong'.

== Transportation ==
- Seoul Station of and of
- Hoehyeon station of
- Myeong-dong station of

== See also ==
- Administrative divisions of South Korea
