= Hoehyeon station =

Train station in Seoul, South Korea

Coordinates: 37.55849°N 126.97814°E

회현 (남대문시장); Hoehyeon (Namdaemun Market)
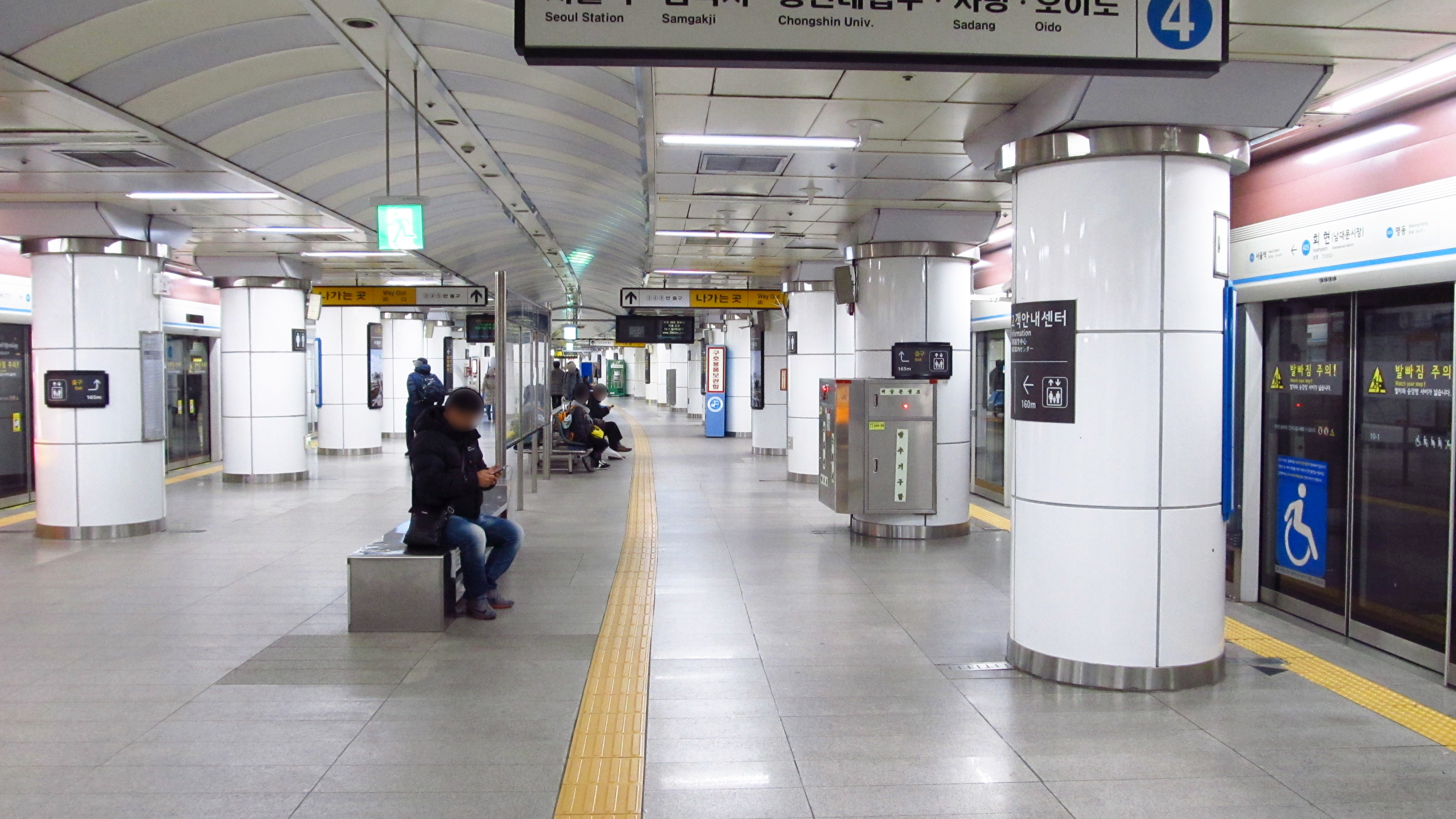
- Station platform

Korean name
- Hangul: 회현역
- Hanja: 會賢驛
- Revised Romanization: Hoehyeon-nyeok
- McCune–Reischauer: Hoehyŏn-nyŏk

General information
- Location: 54 Toegye-ro, 46 Namchang-dong, Jung-gu, Seoul
- Operated by: Seoul Metro
- Line: Line 4
- Platforms: 1
- Tracks: 2

Construction
- Structure type: Underground

Key dates
- October 18, 1985: Line 4 opened

Passengers
- (Daily) Based on Jan-Dec of 2012. Line 4: 65,714
Location

Hoehyeon Station (Korean: 회현역) is a station on the Seoul Subway Line 4. It is the closest station to the historical gate of Namdaemun, and also serves the major shopping district of Namdaemun Market. This station is located in Namchang-dong, Jung District, Seoul.

== Station layout ==
G	Street level	Exit

L1; Concourse	Lobby	Customer Service, Shops, Vending machines, ATMs

L2; Platforms	Northbound	← Line 4 toward Jinjeop (Myeong-dong)
L2; Platforms	Island platform, doors will open on the left
L2; Platforms	Southbound	Line 4 toward Oido (Seoul Station) →

== Vicinity ==
- Exit 4 : Seoul Hilton Hotel
- Exit 5 : Namdaemun
- Exit 6 : Namdaemun Market
- Exit 7 : Shinsegae Department Store, Bank of Korea

Preceding station	Seoul Metropolitan Subway	Following station
Myeong-dong towards Jinjeop	Line 4	Seoul Station towards Oido
