= Kapag Nahati ang Puso =

2018 Philippine television drama series

- Title card
- Also known as: Broken Hearts
- Genre: Romantic drama
- Created by: Kuts Enriquez
- Written by: John Kenneth de Leon; Rona Lean Sales; Anna Aleta Nadela; Kenneth Angelo Enriquez; Reynaldo Roque Jr.
- Directed by: Gil Tejada Jr.
- Creative director: Roy Iglesias
- Starring: Bea Binene; Benjamin Alves; Sunshine Cruz
- Theme music composer: Vehnee Saturno
- Opening theme: "Di Maisip" by Hannah Precillas
- Country of origin: Philippines
- Original language: Tagalog
- No. of episodes: 80 (list of episodes)

Production
- Executive producers: Dhony Haiquez; KJ Corpus
- Editors: Mark Oliver Sison; Ron Joseph Suner
- Camera setup: Multiple-camera setup
- Running time: 25—31 minutes
- Production company: GMA Entertainment Group

Original release
- Network: GMA Network
- Release: July 16 – November 2, 2018

Kapag Nahati ang Puso (transl. when the heart is split / international title: Broken Hearts) is a 2018 Philippine television drama romance series broadcast by GMA Network. Directed by Gil Tejada Jr., it stars Bea Binene, Benjamin Alves and Sunshine Cruz. It premiered on July 16, 2018 on the network's afternoon line up. The series concluded on November 2, 2018, with a total of 80 episodes.

The series is originally titled as Karibal Ko ang Aking Ina. It is streaming online on YouTube.

== Premise ==
Rio Matias and Claire del Valle become rivals when they cross paths without knowing their real relationship as biological mother and daughter by coincidence, they both fall in love with Joaquin Espiritu.

== Cast and characters ==
Cast

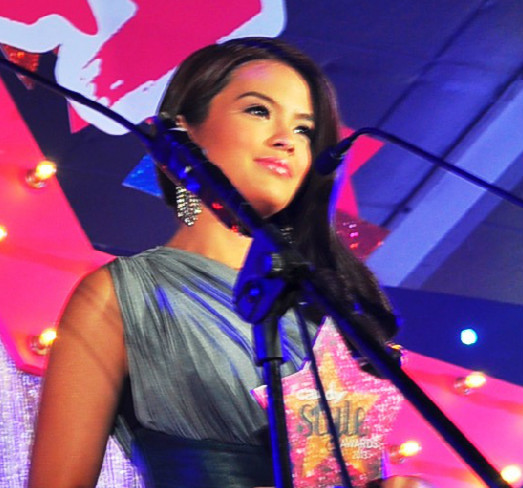
Bea Binene

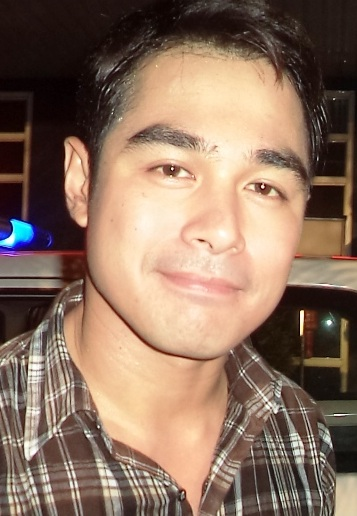
Benjamin Alves

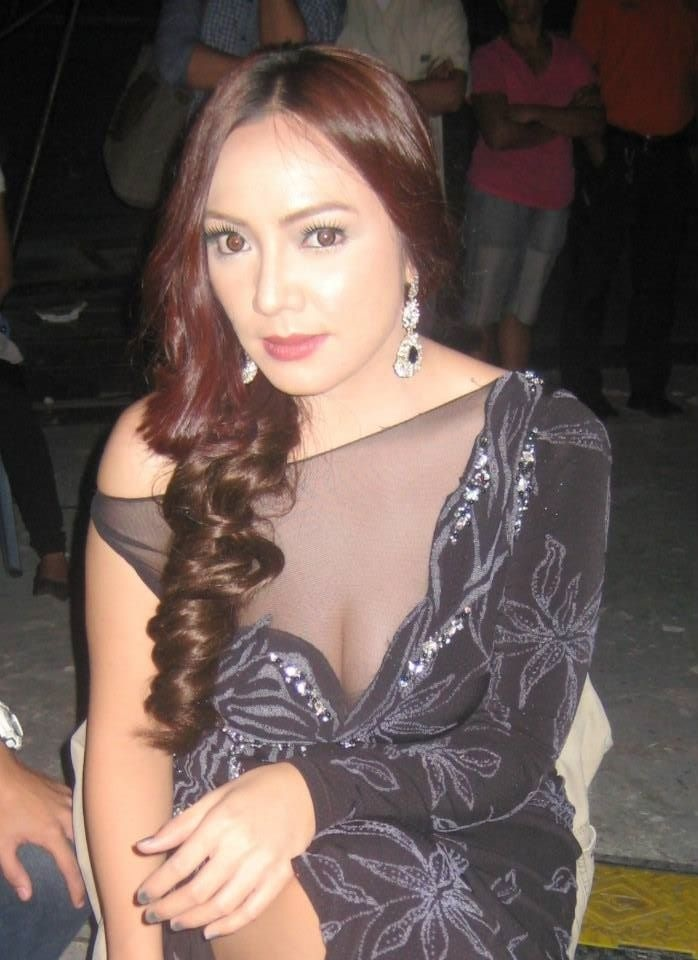
Shermaine Santiago

Lead cast

- Bea Binene as Claire del Valle / Gabriella Matias-del Valle
- Benjamin Alves as Joaquin Espiritu
- Sunshine Cruz as Rosario "Rio" Matias-del Valle / Rio Fonacier-del Valle

Supporting cast

- Bing Loyzaga as Miranda Aseron
- David Licauco as Zachary "Zach" Yee
- Zoren Legaspi as Enrico "Nico / Nick" del Valle
- Racquel Villavicencio as Amparo del Valle
- Geleen Eugenio as Delilah
- Nar Cabico as Samson
- Shermaine Santiago as Jasmine
- Jade Lopez as Kat
- Chinggay Riego as Joy
- Tom Olivar as Tonyo
- Rosemarie Sarita as Pilar
- Aaron Yanga as Julius
- Lianne Valentin as Ginger Santillan

Guest cast

- Freddie Webb as Ramon del Valle
- Mia Pangilinan as Sonya
- Lander Vera Perez as Edgar
- Cherry Madrigal as Malou
- Kyle Vergara as Buboy
- Mike Jovida as Ramirez
- Jan Manual as Miggy
- Elle Ramirez as Chloe
- Addy Raj as Hamish Gupta
- Kelley Day as Bernice Manalili
- Divine Aucina as Annie
- Andrew Schimmer as Tope

== Ratings ==
According to AGB Nielsen Philippines' Nationwide Urban Television Audience Measurement People in Television Homes, the final episode of Kapag Nahati ang Puso scored a 7% rating.
