= Arco (band) =

British indie pop band

- Origin: United Kingdom
- Genres: Slowcore, folk, indie pop
- Years active: 1998-present
- Labels: Dreamy; Pastel
- Members: Chris Healey; Nick Healey; Dave Milligan
- Website: arco.org.uk

Arco are a British indie pop band noted for unusually slow, quiet, poetic music: a gig review in national newspaper The Guardian suggested "an hour in arco's company is the aural equivalent of a day in a flotation tank". Similarly, a review in Q, a UK monthly music magazine, described first album Coming To Terms as "the aural equivalent of a human being pausing for thought as the world speeds on around".

Their track "Lullaby" was featured on the soundtrack album of Californication on Showtime.

In Korea, the two tracks "Alien" and "Perfect World" were featured on the soundtrack album of network drama series Coffee Prince, while "Lullaby" featured in an advertisement for Sky mobile phones, and "Babies Eyes" in an advert for "17" tea. "Alien" also appeared in the soundtrack of the film Turning Green, and in the soundtrack of One Tree Hill (series 1, episode 15).

In 2005 they played a tour of the US west coast, including gigs at Los Angeles, Santa Cruz, San Francisco, Portland and Seattle.

Their most recent, and apparently final album, Yield, was released via Pastel in Korea in 2010.

== Members ==
- Chris Healey – vocals, guitars, keyboards
- Dave Milligan – bass, guitars
- Nick Healey – drums

== Discography ==
=== EPs ===
- Longsighted (1998)
- Ending Up (1998)
- Driving at Night (2000)
- Alien (2001)

=== Albums ===
- Coming to Terms (2000)
- Transparency (compilation album, 2002)
- Restraint (2004)
- Yield (2010)
