= Benjamin Alves =

Filipino actor and model (born 1989)

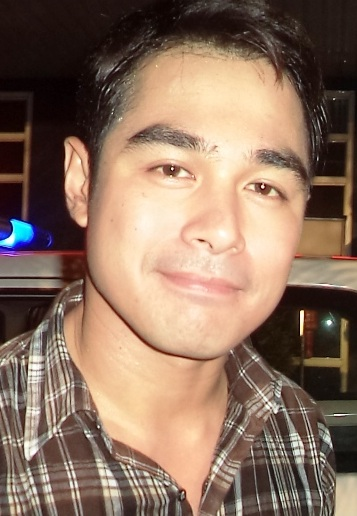
- Alves in 2016
- Born: Benjamin Sapida (Note: Benjamin Alves was born in Guam, United States. Thus, he does not possess his mother's maiden name which is Quiambao.); March 31, 1989 (age 37); Hagåtña, Guam, United States
- Other names: Ben, Benj, Benjie
- Citizenship: United States, Philippines
- Education: University of Guam
- Occupations: Model, actor
- Years active: 2006–present
- Agents: Viva Artists Agency (2006–2009); Sparkle GMA Artist Center (2012–present)
- Height: 1.80 m (5 ft 11 in)
- Spouse: Chelsea Robato (m. 2024)
- Relatives: Piolo Pascual (uncle); Iñigo Pascual (cousin); Julia Pascual (cousin)

Benjamin Sapida (born March 31, 1989), whose previous screen name was Vince Saldaña and current screen name is Benjamin Alves, is a Filipino-Guamanian actor and model under the management of GMA Network.

== Biography ==
=== Early life ===
Alves was born Benjamin Quiambao Sapida on March 31, 1989, Hagåtña, Guam. He is a nephew of Filipino actor Piolo Pascual.

=== Vince Saldaña (2006–2009) ===
In 2006, Alves went to the Philippines to pursue a modeling career. He entered showbusiness with the screen name Vince Saldaña in 2008 and appeared in ABS-CBN's reality model-search competition Close-Up to Fame, where he was a finalist. He then signed a contract with VIVA and got his first acting role in QTV's teen series Posh in 2007. In that same year, he appeared in other Viva Films movies like Ang Cute ng Ina Mo and Apat Dapat, Dapat Apat. He also starred on teleseryes Dalawang Tisoy in RPN 9, Ysabella on ABS-CBN and Impostora on GMA Network. Apart from his work on television series and films, Alves also appeared in various TV commercials and magazines. He was supposed to be one of the cast of GMA Network's L.U.V. Pow but was withdrawn after the cast reboot. Alves left show business in 2009 to continue his studies.

In 2012, Alves graduated summa cum laude from the University of Guam with a degree in English Literature. In a press interview, he revealed initial plans to pursue a master's degree, but ultimately decided to stay in the entertainment industry.

=== Benjamin Alves and contract with GMA Network (2012–present) ===
Saldaña was relaunched in the Philippine entertainment scene as Benjamin Alves by Mercator Model and Artist Management. He signed an exclusive contract with GMA Network for three films and soap operas. He was officially launched on the Sunday variety show, Party Pilipinas on June 25, 2012, as the newest Kapuso star, and was also dubbed as the newest Kapuso heartthrob. His first movie under Regal Films and GMA Films was Guni-Guni, playing as Paolo Lopez, the love interest of actress Lovi Poe. He also appeared in the GMA Films entry to the 2012 Metro Manila Film Festival, Coño Problems. In August 2012, Alves was announced as part of the cast for the Philippine adaptation of the 2007 K-drama series Coffee Prince, as Errol, a record-producer and half-brother of lead Aljur Abrenica.

In 2013, he starred in the independent film Sana Dati alongside TJ Trinidad, Lovi Poe and Paulo Avelino under GMA Films.

=== Personal life ===
Alves was in a relationship with singer-actress Julie Anne San Jose from May 2016 to November 2018. San Jose confirmed their relationship on January 7, 2017, and later publicly confirmed their breakup in January 2019.

Alves wed content creator Chelsea Robato on January 28, 2024, at Santuario de San Antonio Parish Church in Makati.

== Filmography ==
=== Film ===
Year	Title	Role
2007	Ang Cute ng Ina Mo	Jojo
2007	Apat Dapat, Dapat Apat	Junior
2012	Guni-Guni	Paolo Lopez
2013	Sana Dati	Andrew Cesario
2013	Islands	The Astronaut
2014	The Trial	Paco Sequia
2015	Heneral Luna	Lt. Manuel L. Quezon
2015	Gayuma	Mike
2016	Dagsin	Young Justino Razon
2017	Spirit of the Glass 2: The Haunted	Jag
2018	Goyo: Ang Batang Heneral	Young Manuel L. Quezon
2025	Quezon	Young Manuel L. Quezon

=== Television series ===
Year	Title	Role
2007	Dalawang Tisoy	
2007	Ysabella	
2007	Impostora	Tristan (credited as Vince Saldaña)
2012	Coffee Prince	Errol Ochoa
2013	Unforgettable	Miguel De Ocampo
2013	Superbook	Superbook Agent
2013	Katipunan	Sebastian
2013–2014	Adarna	Bok
2014	Dading	Joemar Rodriguez
2015	Hiram na Alaala	Doc. Kerby
2015	Beautiful Strangers	Lawrence Castillo
2016	A1 Ko Sa 'Yo	Jay
2016	Sa Piling ni Nanay	Javier Mercado
2017	Pinulot Ka Lang sa Lupa	Ephraim Esquivel
2017	I Heart Davao	Paul Gutierrez
2018	Kapag Nahati ang Puso	Joaquin Espiritu
2019	Sahaya	Aratu Calliste
2019	Dahil sa Pag-Ibig	Eldon Corpuz
2020	I Can See You: The Promise	Jude Agoncillo
2021	Owe My Love	"Migs" Alcancia
2022	Artikulo 247	Noah Borromeo
2023	Magandang Dilag	Atty. Ericson "Eric" Oliveros
2024	Widows' War	Basilio "Basil" Palacios
2025	Akusada	Wilfred Santos

=== Television shows ===
Year	Title	Role
2006	Close-Up to Fame 2	Himself
2006	Posh	Vince
2012–2013	Party Pilipinas	Himself / Performer
2012	Pare & Pare	Himself
2013	Wagas: Tamis ng Unang Pag-ibig	Reynaldo Manansala
2013	Alvin and the Chipmunks	Dave Seville (voiceover)
2015	Karelasyon: "Scandal"	Brando
2015	Imbestigador: "Ang Kwento ni Jasmine"	Jerry
2015	Magpakailanman: "Ang Asawa Kong Aswang"	Johnny
2016	Dear Uge	Jeff
2016	Dishkarte of the Day	Himself / Guest
2016	Wagas	Jun
2016	Wagas: The Love for Courageous Caitie	Jay-Jay Lucas
2016	Alamat: "Alamat ng Saging"	Aging (voice)
2016	Karelasyon: "Inay"	David
2016	Magpakailanman: "Ang Hinagpis ng Isang Ina"	Chef Hasset Go
2017	Daig Kayo ng Lola Ko	Richard
2017	Wish Ko Lang	Joseph
2019	Magpakailanman: "Tatlong Henerasyon ng Sipag at Tiyaga"	Young Manny Villar
2021	All-Out Sundays	Himself / Guest Performer & Co-host
2023	Magpakailanman: "Ang Mister na Walang Misis"	Benjie Abad-Seña

== Accolades ==
Year	Award-giving body	Award	Work/Nominee	Result
2013	61st FAMAS Awards	Great Shape Award	—N/a	Won
2017	12th Myx Music Awards	Favorite Guest Appearance in a Music Video	Himself for "Naririnig Mo Ba" by Julie Anne San Jose	Nominated
