= Coffee Prince (Philippine TV series) =

2012 Philippine television drama series

- Title card
- Genre: Drama; Romantic comedy
- Based on: Coffee Prince (2007) by Sun-mi Lee
- Developed by: Des Garbes Severino
- Written by: Marlon De Leon; Marlon Miguel; Onay Sales
- Directed by: Ricky Davao
- Creative director: Jun Lana
- Starring: Aljur Abrenica; Kris Bernal
- Theme music composer: Keith Martin
- Opening theme: "Because of You" by Jay-R
- Country of origin: Philippines
- Original language: Tagalog
- No. of episodes: 35 (list of episodes)

Production
- Executive producer: Michele R. Borja
- Production locations: Batangas, Philippines; Tagaytay, Philippines
- Cinematography: Chiqui L. Soriano
- Camera setup: Multiple-camera setup
- Running time: 30–45 minutes
- Production company: GMA Entertainment TV

Original release
- Network: GMA Network
- Release: October 8 – November 23, 2012

Coffee Prince is a 2012 Philippine television drama romance comedy series broadcast by GMA Network. The series is based on Sun-mi Lee's novel Coffee Prince. Directed by Ricky Davao, it stars Kris Bernal and Aljur Abrenica. It premiered nationally on October 8, 2012, on the network's Telebabad line up. The series concluded on November 23, 2012, with a total of 35 episodes.

== Premise ==
Andy is a hardworking young woman who supports her mother and sister after the death of their father. To sustain their daily needs, she earns a living as a tricycle driver. Arthur, on the other hand, is a happy-go-lucky and wealthy bachelor whose family owns the biggest coffee factory in the country. His grandmother constantly pressures him to settle down, but Arthur is not yet ready to tie the knot.

To avoid the dates arranged by his domineering granny, Arthur hires Andy to pretend to be his gay lover. He doesn't know that Andy is just pretending to be a guy to keep her job in Arthur's coffee shop. Desperate to pay off her family's debt, Andy is left with no choice but to agree to Arthur's plan and to continue with her charade.

Complications arise when Andy starts to fall in love with Arthur. He is likewise unable to control his feelings for Andy and he starts questioning his sexuality.

== Cast and characters ==
Cast

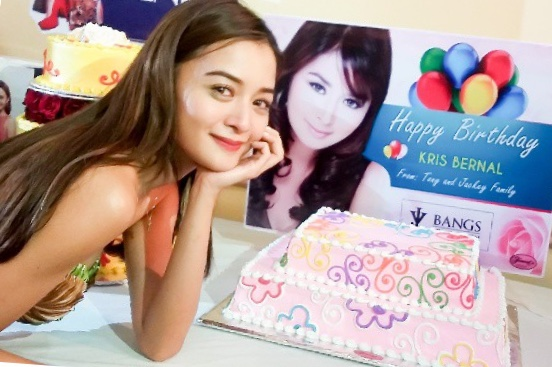
Kris Bernal

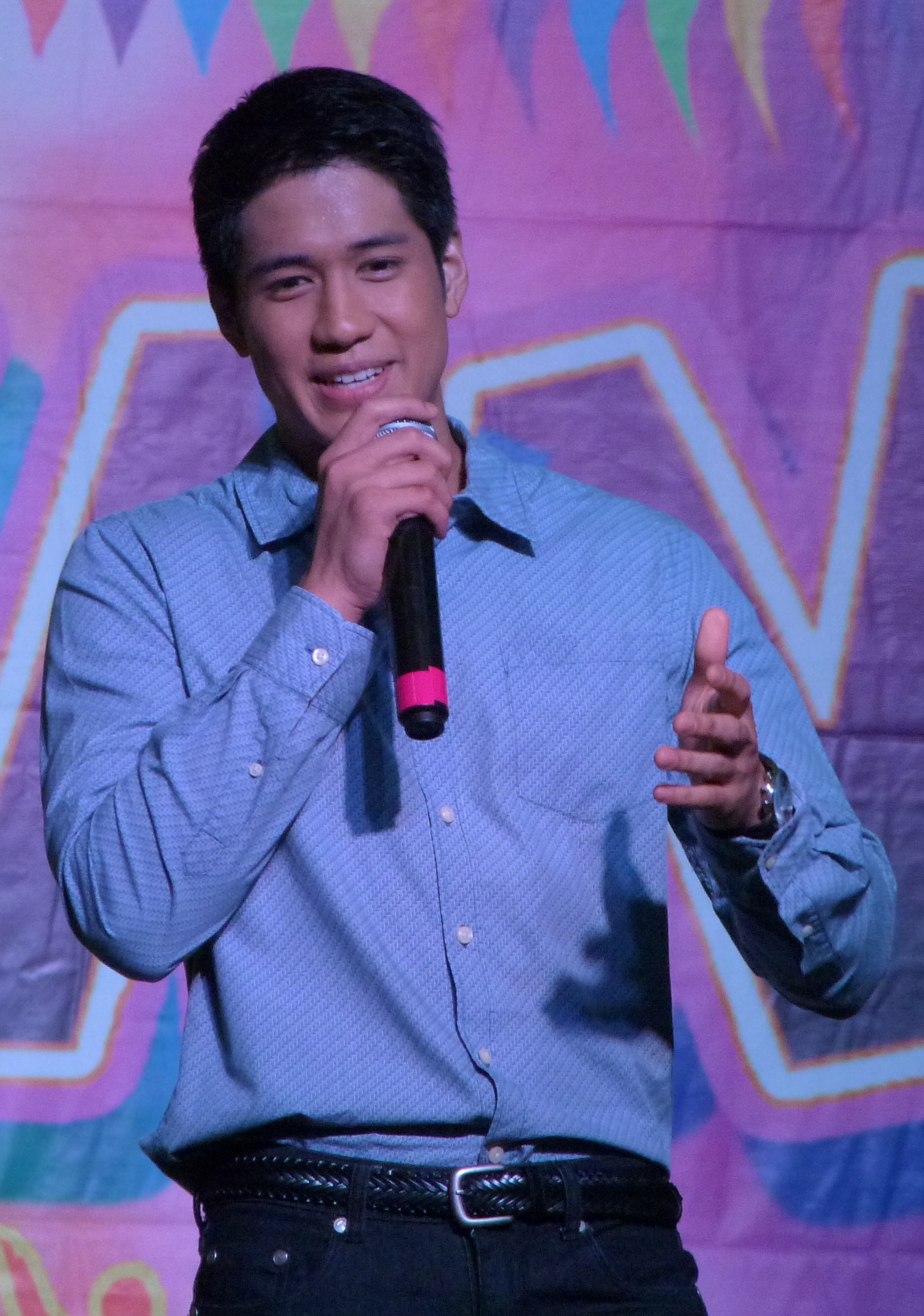
Aljur Abrenica

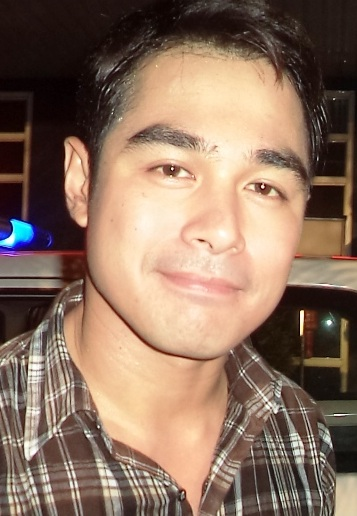
Benjamin Alves

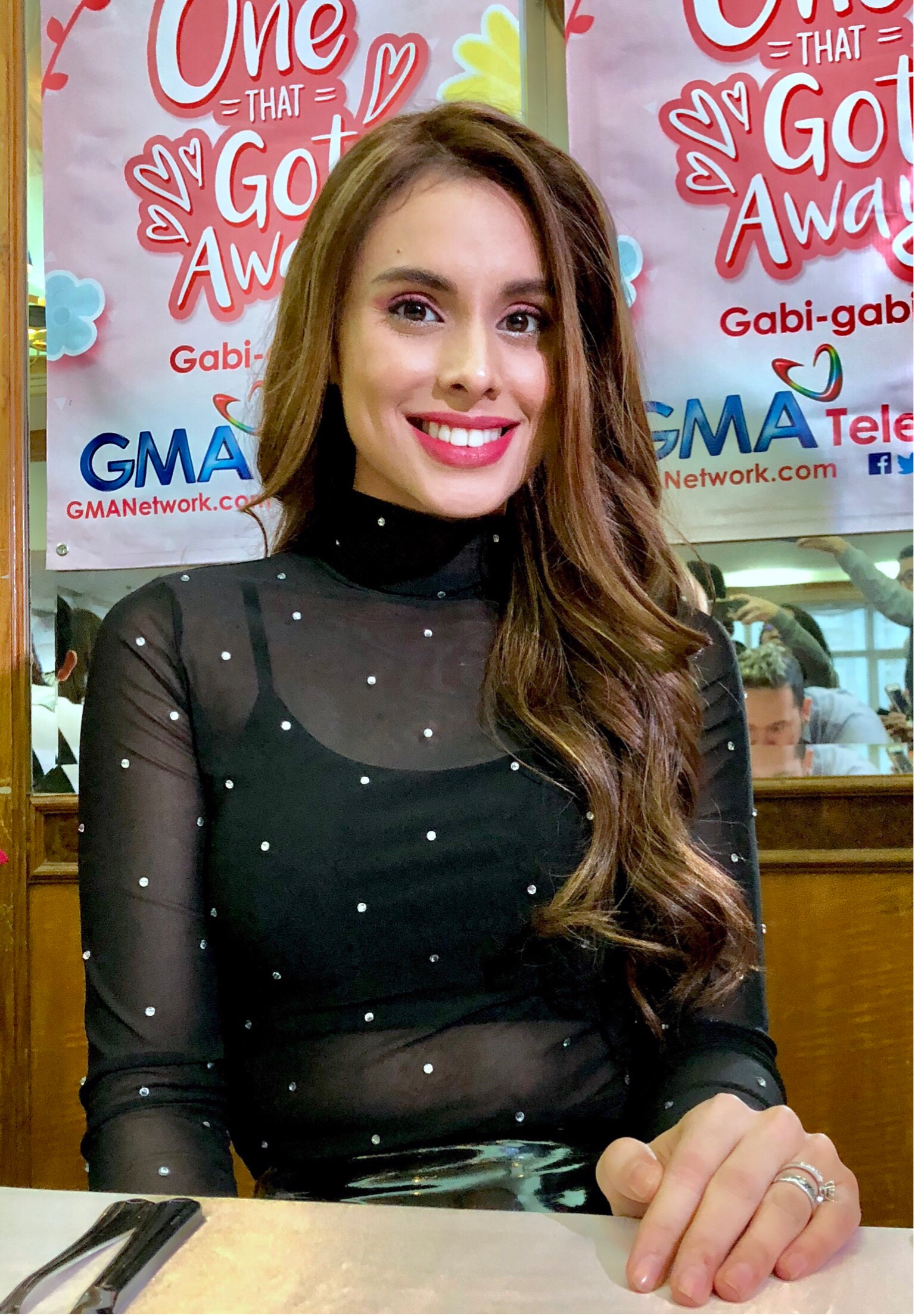
Max Collins

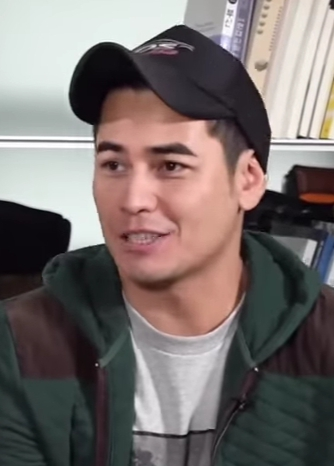
Fabio Ide

=== Lead cast ===
- Kris Bernal as Andrea "Andy" Gomez

Because of her tomboyish mannerism and ala "boy next door" looks, Andy always mistaken for a man. But in spite of this, Andy is the epitome of the loving and caring daughter and sister. She is the breadwinner of her family, trying every job to make ends meet and pay her family's outpouring debts. She ends up pretending as a guy to bag a job in a coffeehouse. She eventually falls in love with his boss, Arthur, who's unaware that she is actually a girl.

- Aljur Abrenica as Arthur Ochoa

Known for his happy-go-lucky and impulsive personality. As the heir to a huge coffee company, he struggles to meet all lofty expectations of him, particularly by his over domineering granny, Mamita. And to prove his worth, he ends up taking over a rundown old coffee shop, he named as "Coffee Prince". He is secretly in love with his brother's girlfriend. But unexpected turn of events will lead him to meet his perfect match.

=== Supporting cast ===
- Benjamin Alves as Errol Ochoa

The half-brother of impulsive Arthur. He is an established music producer and considered as the most favoured child in the family. His involvement with Arlene will cause a rift/rivalry between him and his brother, Arthur.

- Max Collins as Arlene Manahan

The girlfriend of Errol and Arthur's childhood sweetheart. With her kindness and sweet nature, she accidentally captured Arthur's heart, which eventually cause a rift between the two brothers. Her true personality comes out when she is with her Errol. She is possessive, manipulative and whinny. The same happens with Arthur. Thus, one of the reasons why Arthur decided to end their relationship.

- Celia Rodriguez as Mamita Ochoa

The Ochoa matriarch, known for her perfectionist, bossy and controlling nature. She is considered as one of the most respected and well-known businesswoman in the world of food business. Mamita is very proud of her humble beginnings. It was only through hard work and diligence that she was able to achieve all the luxuries in life – things she also expects for her grandson, Arthur to follow.

- Tessie Tomas as Elizabeth "Beth" Gomez

A widow who raises her daughters Andy and Mylene the best way she knows. Desperation for money forces her to rely on easy money schemes but always ends up running to Andy to bail her out of trouble.

- Leo Martinez as Ernie Muling Tapang

Arthur's business partner in coffeehouse and also serves as the senior barista there. His ill-tempered and fearless nature seems useless when it comes to Beth, whom he has a secret crush.

- Ces Quesada as Lorna Ochoa

Arthur and Errol's mother. Lorna will do everything she can to keep her family intact. She will eventually resent Andy for his son Arthur.

- Ronnie Henares as Oliver Ochoa

The business-minded father of Arthur and Errol. He is somewhat a disciplinarian, but seems biased when it comes to his two sons, as he always compares the happy-go-lucky Arthur to the goody-good Errol. He often doubts Arthur's ability and worth, convinced that his youngest son is nothing but a freeloader.

- Boy2 Quizon as Ervin Tanchinko

The best friend and confidante of Arthur. He works at Arthur's coffee shop as interior designer and barista.

- Steven Silva as Bamboo Buendia

Errol's best friend.

- Fabio Ide as Leo Bonito

A Brazilian national who used to sell Brazilian desserts in the mall. He applied as a barista in Coffee Prince in order to finish his studies.

- Sef Cadayona as Baldo

The suitor of Andy's sister, Mylene. He also works as a barista in Coffee Prince and the only one besides Ernie who knows the secret behind Andy's identity.

- Kim Rodriguez as Mylene Gomez

The younger sister of Andy.

== Development ==
Coffee Prince (Korean: 커피프린스 1호점) is a 2007 Korean drama series starring Yoon Eun-hye, Gong Yoo, Lee Sun-kyun and Chae Jung-an. It is based on Lee Sun-mi's novel of the same title. It was originally broadcast in South Korea by MBC on July 2, 2007, and concluded on August 28, 2007. It became one of the most popular series in Korea that year, garnering high ratings and winning several awards, including Best TV Drama at the 20th Korean Producers' Award; Best TV Actress and Best New TV Director at the 44th Baeksang Arts Awards for Yoon Eun-hye and Lee Yoon-jung, respectively; Top Excellence in Acting and Excellence in Acting awards for Yoon Eun-hye and Gong Yoo, respectively, and PD Award for Kim Chang-wan at the 2007 MBC Drama Awards.

From January 1 to March 19, 2008, GMA Network aired the series. and is considered as one of the best Korean series the network has aired. On September 26, 2008, during a press event, GMA Network's Wilma Galvante, shared their plans for the rest of 2008 and the first quarter of 2009. Galvante announced that the network has bought the rights rights of Coffee Prince to produce the Philippine version.

Actresses, Jolina Magdangal, Chynna Ortaleza and Sheena Halili were reportedly vying for the female lead role. In July 2012, the network announced that they were back to the drawing board for the adaptation, with Aljur Abrenica and Kris Bernal in the lead roles. It was after the network shelved the project of Abrenica and Bernal with Rhian Ramos, the television series Sana Dalawa ang Puso Ko (transl. I Hope I Have Two Hearts).

The production team wanted to deliver the series as a "real" Philippine television series, rather than just a remake of an original Korean show. Screenwriter Des Garbes Severino was assigned as the headwriter of the series. While there are many similarities to the original series, some changes were made by adding more interesting twists and turns, new characters and Pinoy flavour to it. "When we adapt, we get the main story or the main premise. Most of the major plotlines are intact. We adapt it to our local setting. For instance, in the original version, Andy is a delivery girl. But we're not familiar with that, although we do have delivery boys. So we've made her a tricycle driver. If you notice, the Korean version, though a romance-comedy, is more on light romance. This time around, we explore the concept of romantic comedy. There will be funny scenes along with heartwarming moments," Severino shares. She also admits that doing an adaptation is quite challenging. The creative people behind Coffee Prince are also faced with the task to make the story, given the character arcs, more interesting and better than the original. "Die-hard fans, who know every twist and turn of the story, won't get disappointed because the iconic scenes such as Arthur carrying Andy on his back and he running after her from condo to restaurant asking for apology will be there,"she added. The producer hired actor/director Ricky Davao to handle the series.

=== Casting ===
Coffee Prince served as Abrenica and Bernal's reunion project and first romantic-comedy series in GMA. In preparing for the role, Bernal said she really had to study how a real man acts and respond to situations before she went in front of the cameras. She even learned how to drive a tricycle and even willing to cut her hair short to make her role more realistic. Bernal added that she really ensures she gets to familiarize with every scene for each episode. Abrenica, on the other hand, couldn't be any happier to reignite his onscreen chemistry with Bernal, stated that their relationship as onscreen partners is incomparable and deep. He added that he's very comfortable with Bernal so there's no big adjustment between them. When it comes to his role, he considered it as his most challenging role so far. "I made character research here. There's a part in the story that I will question my sexuality. That's quite challenging for me," he added. Both Bernal and Abrenica underwent several workshops under Director Maryo J. de los Reyes before the cameras roll, in preparation for their characters. Series' director, Ricky Davao is all praise for his lead casts, described that Bernal is a delight to work with and Abrenica is quite serious [on his work] and very sensitive. "I'm very happy with my cast, they are all good and they fit into their roles," he added. Davao also had a short cameo appearance in the show. He played Mando, Andy's loving father.

Benjamin Alves and Max Collins were assigned to play Errol and Arlene's characters. Alves relates himself to his role, said that: "[Like Errol...] I'm responsible, and I know what needs to be done. I take every bit of information in before I express myself -- but, this is due to character's sad back story, which involves Collins' character breaking his heart," he says.

The show revolved not only on the main character's comical romance, but also at the fictional coffee shop called Coffee Prince, and its baristas. One of those is Boy 2 Quizon who played Ervin. Quizon stated that it's his first gay role and naming Hollywood's Chris Colfer as his peg. "Actually, it was a concept of our director, Ricky Davao. He wants me to do this. It's fine with me, because I don't wanna limit my acting ability," he added. Sef Cadayona originally auditioned for Ervin, but ended up portraying Baldo. He was told by the producers that it was better for him to play Baldo role, as he already played gay character in 2011 primetime series, Time of My Life which also starred Bernal.

Shared equally vital roles in the series are veteran actors, Tessie Tomas who played Beth, Andy and Mylene's mother.

== Production ==
Principal photography commenced in September 2012.

== Reception ==
=== Ratings ===
According to AGB Nielsen Philippines' Mega Manila household television ratings, the pilot episode of Coffee Prince earned a 21.8% rating. The final episode scored a 23.3% rating.

=== Critical reception ===
The Manila Times' Ed Uy said that "Kris Bernal and Aljur Abrenica give endearing performances in the Filipino remake of Koreanovela Coffee Prince". Jojo Gabinete of Abante Tonight said that Bernal and Alves have a strong chemistry onscreen. Remate's Pete Ampoloquio Jr. stated "it's an unassailable fact that they do have chemistry and it's one of the reasons why their tandem is well-followed and successful". Yahoo! OMG said "with her lead role in the Philippine version of Korean series Coffee Prince, Kris Bernal is one to watch".
