= Coffee Prince (South Korean TV series) =

2007 South Korean TV series

- Promotional poster
- Hangul: 커피프린스 1호점
- Hanja: 커피프린스 1號店
- Lit.: The 1st Shop of Coffee Prince
- RR: Keopi peurinseu 1hojeom
- MR: K'ŏp'i p'ŭrinsŭ 1hojŏm
- Genre: Romance; Comedy; Drama
- Based on: The 1st Shop of Coffee Prince by Lee Sun-mi
- Written by: Lee Jung-ah; Jang Hyun-joo
- Directed by: Lee Yoon-jung
- Starring: Yoon Eun-hye; Gong Yoo; Lee Sun-kyun; Chae Jung-an
- Opening theme: "Lalala, It's Love!" by The Melody
- Ending theme: "Go Go Chan!!" by Tearliner feat. Yozoh
- Composer: Tearliner
- Country of origin: South Korea
- Original language: Korean
- No. of episodes: 17

Production
- Producer: Lee Eun-kyu
- Camera setup: Multi-camera
- Running time: 60 minutes

Original release
- Network: Munhwa Broadcasting Corporation
- Release: July 2 – August 28, 2007

Related
- Coffee Prince (Thailand); Coffee Prince (Philippines); My Coffee Prince (Malaysia); Prince Coffee Lab (China)

Coffee Prince (Korean: 커피프린스 1호점) is a 2007 South Korean television series starring Yoon Eun-hye, Gong Yoo, Lee Sun-kyun, and Chae Jung-an. Based on the novel of the same name written by Lee Sun-mi, it aired on MBC's Monday and Tuesday at 21:55 (KST) from July 2 and August 28, 2007, for 17 episodes.

The drama portrays the story of an unlikely romance between a tomboyish woman, who disguises as a man to get a job, and a young food empire mogul. It contains homoerotic elements, as the man did not initially know the tomboy's true gender. Hailed as a hit for its high ratings, the drama received positive reviews from critics and won multiple awards.

== Synopsis ==
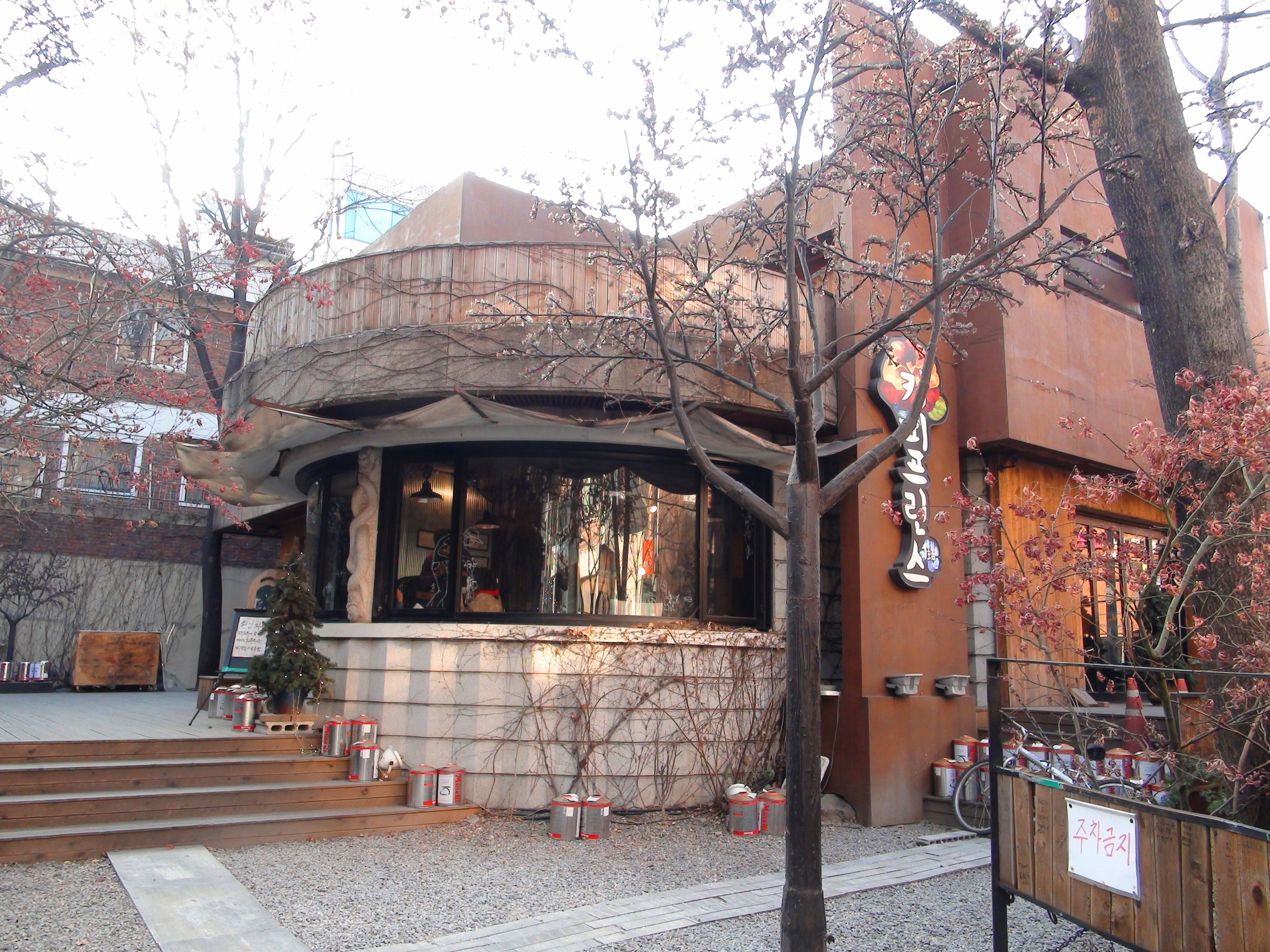
The exterior of filming set in Hongdae, Mapo District, Seoul in 2012

Choi Han-gyeol (Gong Yoo) is the grandson of chairwoman Bang otherwise known as the "Goatman of the town" (Kim Young-ok) of Dong-in Foods, a company that has a thriving coffee business. He never had a job nor does he care for responsibility. Han-gyeol is hung up on his first love, Han Yoo-joo (Chae Jung-an), who only sees him as a friend. Meanwhile, Go Eun-chan (Yoon Eun-hye) is a 24-year-old tomboy who is often mistaken for a boy. Since her father died when she was 16 years old, she has taken over as the breadwinner in her family. When the two meet, Han-gyeol – unaware that Eun-chan is a girl – decides to hire her to pretend to be his gay lover so that he can escape the blind dates arranged by his grandmother.

After getting an ultimatum from his grandmother, Han-gyeol takes over a rundown old coffee shop – later renamed "Coffee Prince" – to prove that he is capable, both to his grandmother and to Yoo-joo. Wanting to attract female customers, he only hires good-looking male employees. Desperate for money, Eun-chan continues to hide her gender to get a job at Coffee Prince. While working together feelings start to develop between Eun-chan and Han-gyeol. Still unaware that Eun-chan is a woman, Han-gyeol starts to ask their own sexualities and is thrown into turmoil.

== Cast ==
=== Main ===
- Yoon Eun-hye as Koh Eun-chan

A cheerful and friendly girl with a large appetite, she works multiple jobs to support her family. With her short haircut, baggy clothes and flat chest, Eun-chan is often mistaken for a boy.

- Gong Yoo as Choi Han-gyeol

The grandson of chairwoman Bang of Dongin Foods, a company that has a thriving coffee business. He is an intelligent man but is fiercely independent and abhors the thought of being tied down by one career in his life.

- Lee Sun-kyun as Choi Han-sung

A talented record producer and Han-gyeol's cousin.

- Chae Jung-an as Han Yoo-joo

Han-gyeol's first love and Han-sung's ex-girlfriend, Yoo-joo is a talented professional painter.

=== Supporting ===
- Lee Eon as Hwang Min-yeop

Coffee Prince waiter. Strong and sweet-natured but not very smart, he is devoted to Eun-sae – Go Eun-chan's younger sister – who treats him with disdain, and is the first to discover Eun-chan's true gender.

- Kim Dong-wook as Jin Ha-rim

Coffee Prince waiter. Outgoing and hot-tempered, he is the first recruited to the cafe by his close friend Choi Han-gyeol. He is fond of Eun-chan.

- Kim Jae-wook as Noh Sun-ki

Coffee Prince chef, Sun-ki is a taciturn half-Japanese man who is recruited to make his popular waffles at the cafe.

- Kim Chang-wan as Hong Gae-shik

Coffee Prince co-manager. His cafe was failing before Han-gyeol is ordered in to clean it up and relaunch it.

- Kim Young-ok as Han-gyeol and Han-sung's grandmother

A stern and powerful woman, she is the head of the family and threatens to withdraw her financial support of Han-gyeol unless he proves he can run a business and be responsible.

- Kim Ja-ok as Han-gyeol's mother
- Choi Il-hwa as Han-gyeol's father
- Yoon Young-ah as Koh Eun-sae

Eun-chan's younger sister who dreams of becoming a rich and famous music star.

- Park Won-sook as Eun-chan and Eun-sae's mother.
- Lee Han-wi as Mr. Ku, a butcher who is infatuated with Eun-chan's mother
- Kim Jung-min as DK, Yoo-joo's ex-boyfriend
- Ban Hye-ra as Yoo-joo's mother
- Choi Eun-seo as Ha Da Young, the girl who wants to learn to make waffles.
- Nam Myeong-ryeol as Myung Jae, Han-gyeol's real father
- Han Da-min as Han Byul
- Yoon Seung-ah as girl playing cards with Han-gyeol on the plane (bit part, ep 1)

== Production ==
=== Filming locations ===
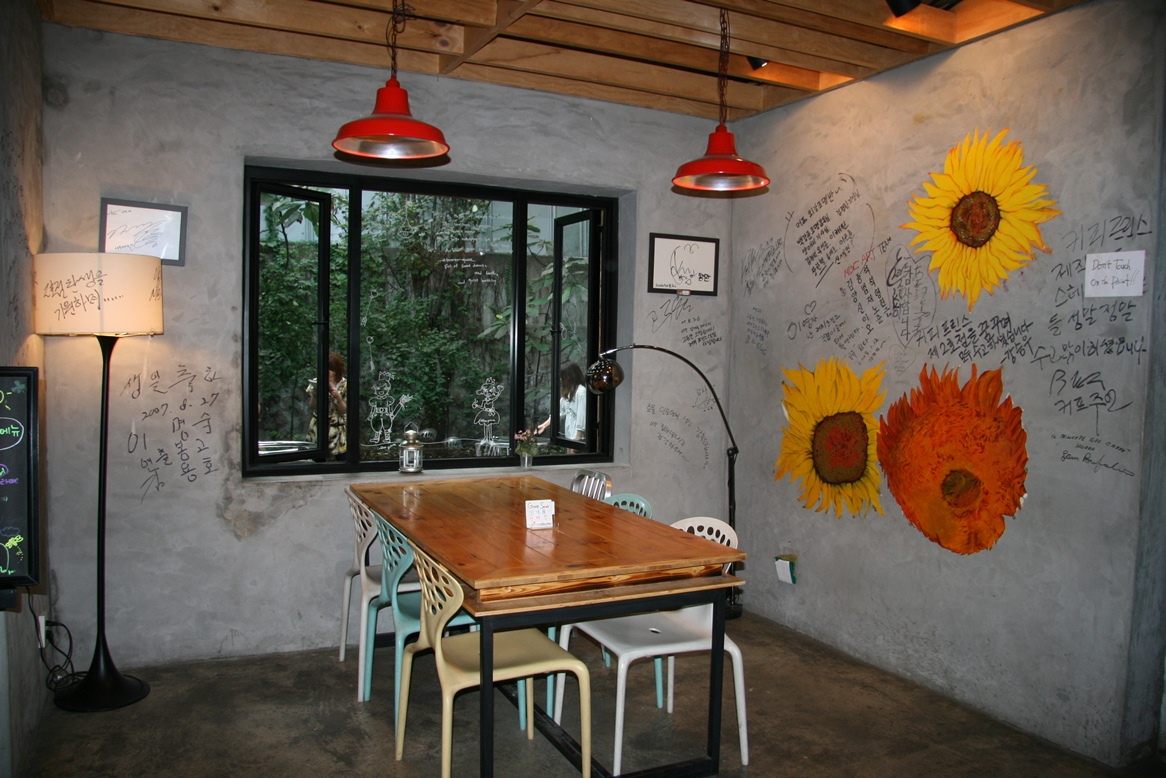
The interior of the filming set featuring the wall flowers painting

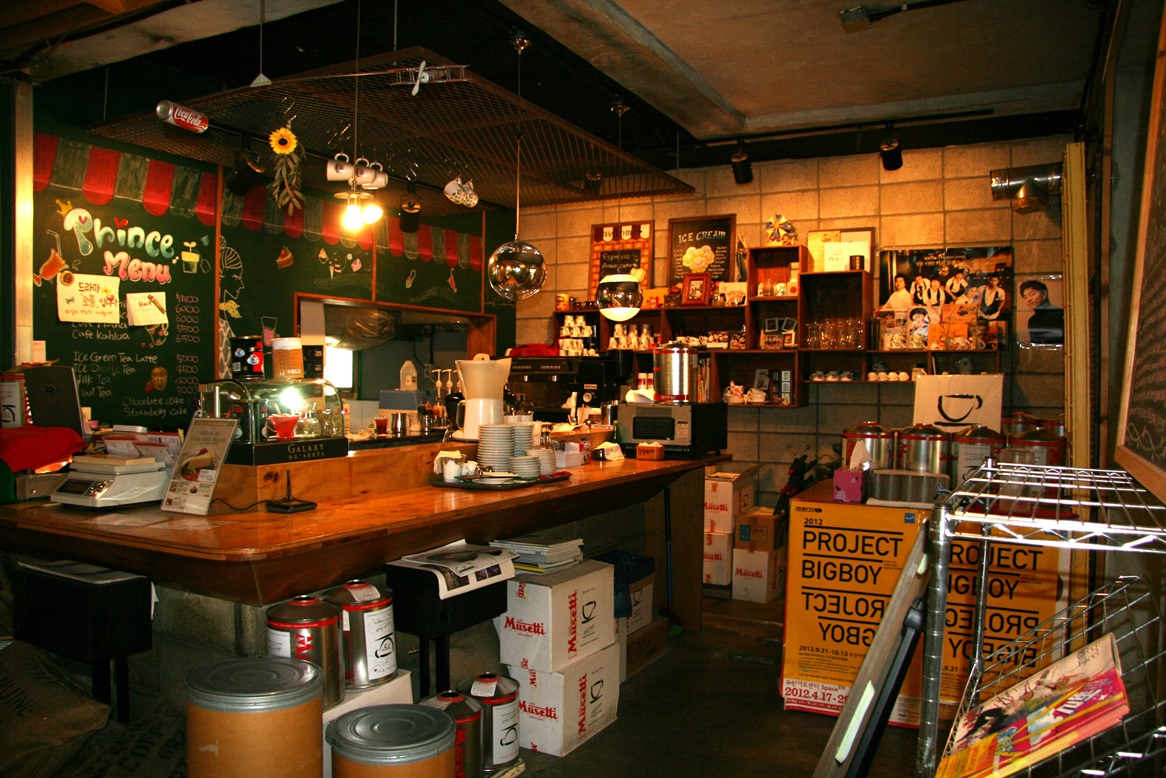
The service counter

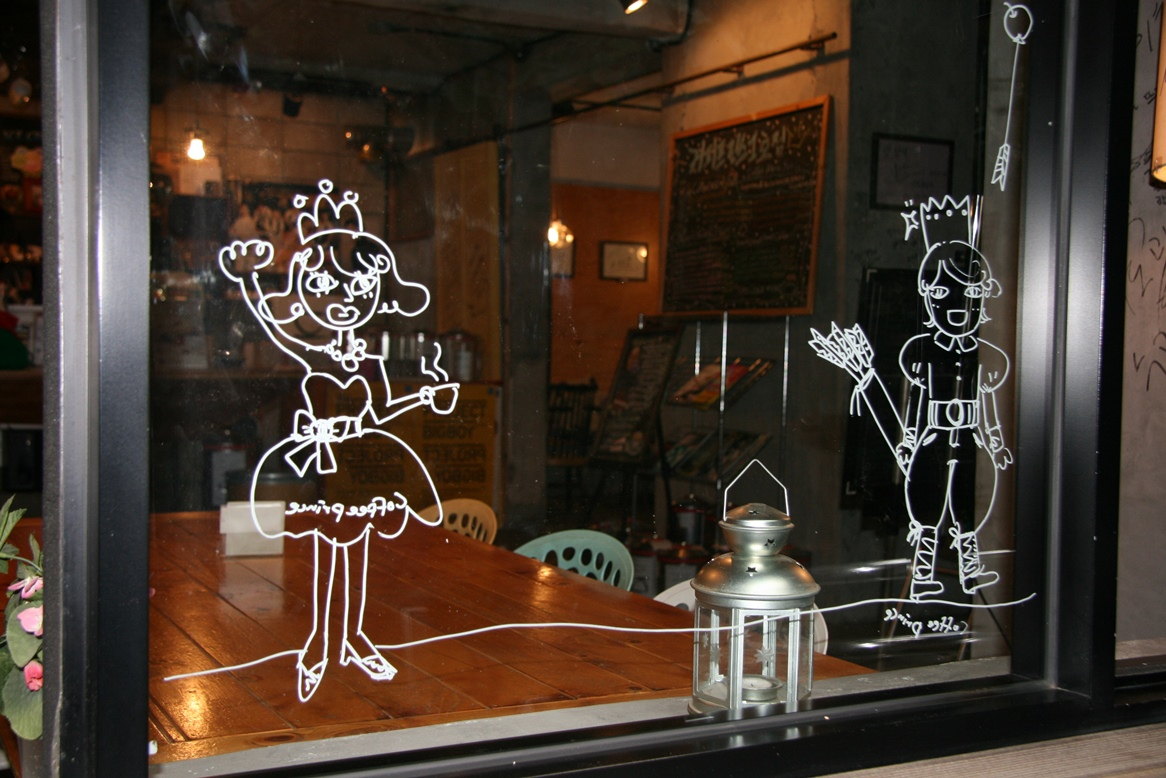
Window art

Many of the scenes filmed on location in Seoul are as follows:

- The "Coffee Prince" was an old coffee shop in Hongdae area, which was remodeled for the filming. The eponymous cafe was reopened after filming concluded with the wall flowers painting by Han Yoo-joo and other props from the drama on display.
- Seoul Animation Center at the foot of Namsan in Yejang-dong, Jung District: The roof top was used as the exterior terrace of Choi Han-gyeol's house. You can see this rooftop garden thoroughly from this scene Coffee Prince, 17회, Sweet Scene
- Yeonhui Matgil (or Yeonhee Street of Flavors), Yeomni-dong in Mapo District: the location of the Chinese restaurant where Han-gyeol and Eun-chan ate.
- The jogging course at Palgakjeong on the Bugak Skyway, Pyeongchang-dong, Jongno District: Where Han-gyeol goes jogging; and where he met Yoo-joo and Eun-chan who brought competing packed meals for him.
- The interior and exterior of the Gwanghwamun branch of Kyobo Book Centre: Where Han-gyeol buys books on coffee to encourage Eun-chan to become a barista.
- Hongdae Playground (or Hongik Children's Park) in Hongdae area: Where Han-gyeol bought Yoo-joo a hat from a street vendor (along Wausan-ro between the playground and Hongik University).
- Stone wall road between Duksung Girls High School and Pungmoon Girls High School, across the road from the start of Insa-dong Street that runs from Insa-dong to Samcheong-dong in Jongno District: Where Han-gyeol helped Eun-chan in the rain, when she encounters a bully on her way home while carrying bags of dolls for sewing work.

In 2011, the Hongdae area and the coffee shop were featured in a National Geographic Channel-produced documentary on the Korean Wave titled Seoul's Got Soul.

== Original soundtrack ==
Album	Track listing
Coffee Prince OST: Released: July 26, 2007; Artist: Various artists; Format: 1CD; Label: Pony Canyon Korea	Track listing: 1. Lalala, It's Love! - The Melody; 2. White Love Story - As One; 3. How About a Cup of Coffee? - Humming Urban Stereo feat. Yozoh; 4. Go Go Chan!! - Tearliner feat. Yozoh; 5. How About a Cup of Coffee? (Guitar Inst.); 6. For a While - MNI Min-jae; 7. Mocha - Casker; 8. Ocean Voyage (Choi Han-sung ver.) - Lee Sun-kyun; 9. 햇살 한 조각 (A Ray of Sunlight) (Inst.) - Tearliner; 10. Polly - The Melody; 11. 알콩달콩 (Lovey Dovey) (Inst.) - Tearliner; 12. Ocean Voyage - Tearliner; 13. Double Shot - Casker; 14. 좋은 기억 (Good Memories) (Inst.) - Tearliner; 15. 바람에 살며시 앉다 (Ocean Voyage Piano ver.) - Oh Soo-kyung; 16. Go Go Chan!! (On-Air ver.) - Tearliner feat. Yozoh
Soundtrack from Coffee Prince: Released: September 14, 2007; Artist: Various artists; Music compiled and selected by Tearliner; Format: 2CD; Label: Pastel Music	Track listing CD1: 1. Love Is Weaken When It Comes Out of Mouth - Low-end Project; 2. "A Reunion and a Bagel" - Yoo-joo & Han-sung's Dialogue; 3. Good Bye - The Melody; 4. May - Belle Epoque; 5. Again (Acoustic Ver.) - Cloud Cuckoo Land; 6. A Desired Confession - Casker; 7. Gazer Razer (Studio Live Ver.) - Tearliner; 8. "Making Up" - Eun-chan & Han-kyul's Dialogue; 9. Make up - Adult Child; 10. I'll Be a Virgin, I'll Be a Mountain - Maximilian Hecker; 11. November - Fanny Fink; 12. "Eun-chan Cries Out Loud" - Eun-chan's Dialogue; 13. Raincoat (A Passing Rain Ver.) - Tearliner; 14. To the Top - Misty Blue; 15. Yoo-joo & Han-sung's Dialogue; 16. Alien - Arco; CD2: 1. "Han-kyul's Confession" - Han-kyul's Dialogue; 2. Sad Thing - Adult Child; 3. "Brotherhood" - Eun-chan & Han-kyul's Dialogue; 4. I Messed Up The Relationship - Low-end Project; 5. Oh My Gosh! - Kim Chang-wan; 6. Coffee is - Cloud Cuckoo Land; 7. Running - Donawhale; 8. "A Maturing Love" - Eun-chan & Han-kyul's Dialogue; 9. A Good Person - Fanny Fink; 10. Wishy-Washy Boy - Tearliner; 11. Last Arpeggios - Bluedawn; 12. "The Discovery of Love" - Eun-chan & Han-kyul's Dialogue; 13. Balloons & Champagne - Ephemera; 14. Novaless - Tearliner; 15. "Eun-chan, Come Quickly! Eun-chan, I Miss You!" - Han-kyul's Dialogue; 16. Perfect World (Restraint) - Arco; 17. Space Island (Moon Version) - Tearliner

== Ratings ==
Date	Episode	Nationwide	Seoul
2007-07-02	1	14.4% (7th)	15.5% (7th)
2007-07-03	2	15.3% (7th)	16.2% (7th)
2007-07-09	3	18.1% (6th)	18.6% (5th)
2007-07-10	4	19.0% (4th)	19.8% (4th)
2007-07-16	5	19.3% (3rd)	20.1% (2nd)
2007-07-17	6	23.2% (2nd)	23.9% (2nd)
2007-07-23	7	25.2% (2nd)	25.3% (2nd)
2007-07-24	8	26.8% (2nd)	28.1% (2nd)
2007-07-30	9	25.2% (2nd)	26.2% (2nd)
2007-07-31	10	25.9% (2nd)	27.3% (2nd)
2007-08-06	11	28.4% (2nd)	30.8% (1st)
2007-08-07	12	29.9% (2nd)	31.4% (2nd)
2007-08-13	13	29.3% (2nd)	32.1% (2nd)
2007-08-14	14	28.1% (2nd)	30.5% (2nd)
2007-08-20	15	27.1% (2nd)	29.0% (2nd)
2007-08-21	16	28.5% (2nd)	30.8% (1st)
2007-08-27	17	27.7% (2nd)	30.5% (2nd)
Average		24.2%	25.6%

Source: TNS Media Korea

== Awards and nominations ==
Year	Award	Category	Recipient	Result
2007	1st Korea Drama Awards	Most Popular Actor	Kim Dong-wook	Won
2007	1st Korea Drama Awards	Most Popular Actor	Kim Jae-wook	Won
2007	1st Korea Drama Awards	Most Popular Actor	Lee Eon	Won
2007	1st Korea Drama Awards	Most Popular Actor	Lee Han-wi	Won
2007	MBC Drama Awards	Top Excellence Award, Actress	Yoon Eun-hye	Won
2007	MBC Drama Awards	Excellence Award, Actor	Gong Yoo	Won
2007	MBC Drama Awards	Excellence Award, Actor	Lee Sun-kyun	Nominated
2007	MBC Drama Awards	Excellence Award, Actress	Chae Jung-an	Nominated
2007	MBC Drama Awards	Best New Actor	Lee Eon	Nominated
2007	MBC Drama Awards	PD Award	Kim Chang-wan	Won
2007	MBC Drama Awards	Viewer's Favorite Drama of the Year	Coffee Prince	Nominated
2007	MBC Drama Awards	Popularity Award, Actor	Gong Yoo	Nominated
2007	MBC Drama Awards	Popularity Award, Actress	Yoon Eun-hye	Nominated
2007	MBC Drama Awards	Best Couple Award	Yoon Eun-hye and Gong Yoo	Nominated
2007	MBC Drama Awards	Best Couple Award	Chae Jung-an and Lee Sun-kyun	Nominated
2008	44th Baeksang Arts Awards	Best Drama	Coffee Prince	Nominated
2008	44th Baeksang Arts Awards	Best Actress (TV)	Yoon Eun-hye	Won
2008	44th Baeksang Arts Awards	Best New Director (TV)	Lee Yoon-jung	Won
2008	44th Baeksang Arts Awards	Best Screenplay (TV)	Lee Jung-ah, Jang Hyun-joo	Nominated
2008	20th Korea PD Awards	Best Drama	Coffee Prince	Won
2008	3rd Seoul International Drama Awards	Best Actress	Yoon Eun-hye	Nominated

== Foreign adaptations ==
In 2012, the drama was remade in Thailand and the Philippines. In 2017, the Malaysian remake of Coffee Prince directed by Michael Ang aired on Astro Ria. In 2018, Coffee Prince gained a Chinese remake titled Prince Coffee Lab, directed by Kang Shin-hyo of The Heirs.
