= Myeong-dong station =

Metro station in Seoul, South Korea

Coordinates: 37.56094°N 126.98666°E

명동 (우리금융타운); Myeong-dong (Woori Financial Town)
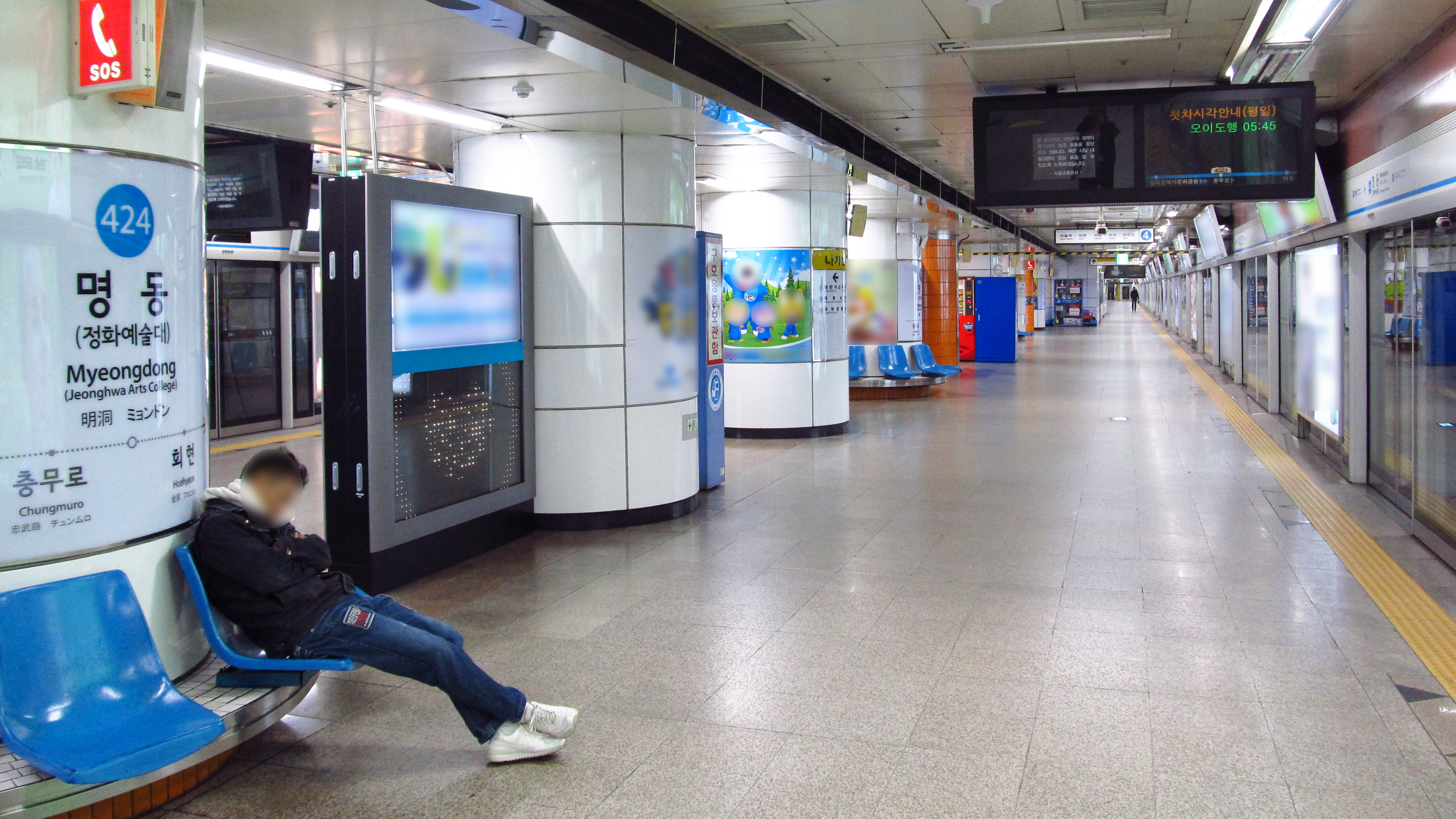
- Station Platform

Korean name
- Hangul: 명동역
- Hanja: 明洞驛
- Revised Romanization: Myeongdong-nyeok
- McCune–Reischauer: Myŏngdong-nyŏk

General information
- Location: 126 Toegye-ro, 64 Chungmuro 2-ga, Jung-gu, Seoul
- Operator: Seoul Metro
- Line: Line 4
- Platforms: 1
- Tracks: 2

Construction
- Structure type: Underground

Key dates
- 18 October 1985: Line 4 opened

Passengers
- (Daily) Based on Jan-Dec 2012. Line 4: 88,293
Location

Myeong-dong Station is a station on the Seoul Subway Line 4. This station is located in Jung-gu, Seoul.

== Station layout ==
G	Street level	Exit

L1; Concourse	Lobby	Customer Service, Shops, Vending machines, ATMs

L2; Platforms	Northbound	← Line 4 toward Jinjeop (Chungmuro)
L2; Platforms	Island platform, doors will open on the left
L2; Platforms	Southbound	Line 4 toward Oido (Hoehyeon) →

== Exits ==
1. Exit 1: Lila Elementary School, Seoul Traffic Broadcasting System, KEPCO
2. Exit 2: Hotel Prince Seoul, Namsan Elementary School
3. Exit 3: Community Center, Pacific Hotel, Soongeui Women's University, China Visa Application Service Center, Soongeui Elementary School
4. Exit 4: LG CNS, IBK Bank, Jeonghwa Arts College
5. Exit 5: Namdaemun Market, Shinsegae Department Store, Lotte Department Store, Westin Josun Seoul Hotel, Central Post Office
6. Exit 6: Myeongdong Shopping Street, Migliore, Savoy Hotel
7. Exit 7: Savoy Hotel, Myeongdong, Migliore, Cinus
8. Exit 8: Myeongdong, KEB Bank
9. Exit 9: Gyesung Girls' High School, Myeongdong Cathedral, Elcanto
10. Exit 10: Jungbu Police Station, Sejong Hotel, National Health Insurance, aik Hospital

== Neighborhood ==
- Myeongdong, a shopping district, famous for its brand stores, department stores and street food stalls.
- Migliore
- Seoul Animation Center
- N Seoul Tower

Preceding station	Seoul Metropolitan Subway	Following station
Chungmuro towards Jinjeop	Line 4	Hoehyeon towards Oido
