= Yejang-dong =

Neighbourhood in Seoul, South Korea

- Sopa-ro, Yejang-dong
- Country: South Korea

Korean name
- Hangul: 예장동
- Hanja: 藝場洞
- RR: Yejang-dong
- MR: Yejang-dong

Yejang-dong (Korean: 예장동) is a legal dong (neighbourhood) of Jung District, Seoul, South Korea. It is administered by its administrative dong, Myeong-dong and Pil-dong.

== See also ==
- Administrative divisions of South Korea
