= Manuel L. Quezon =

President of the Philippines from 1935 to 1944

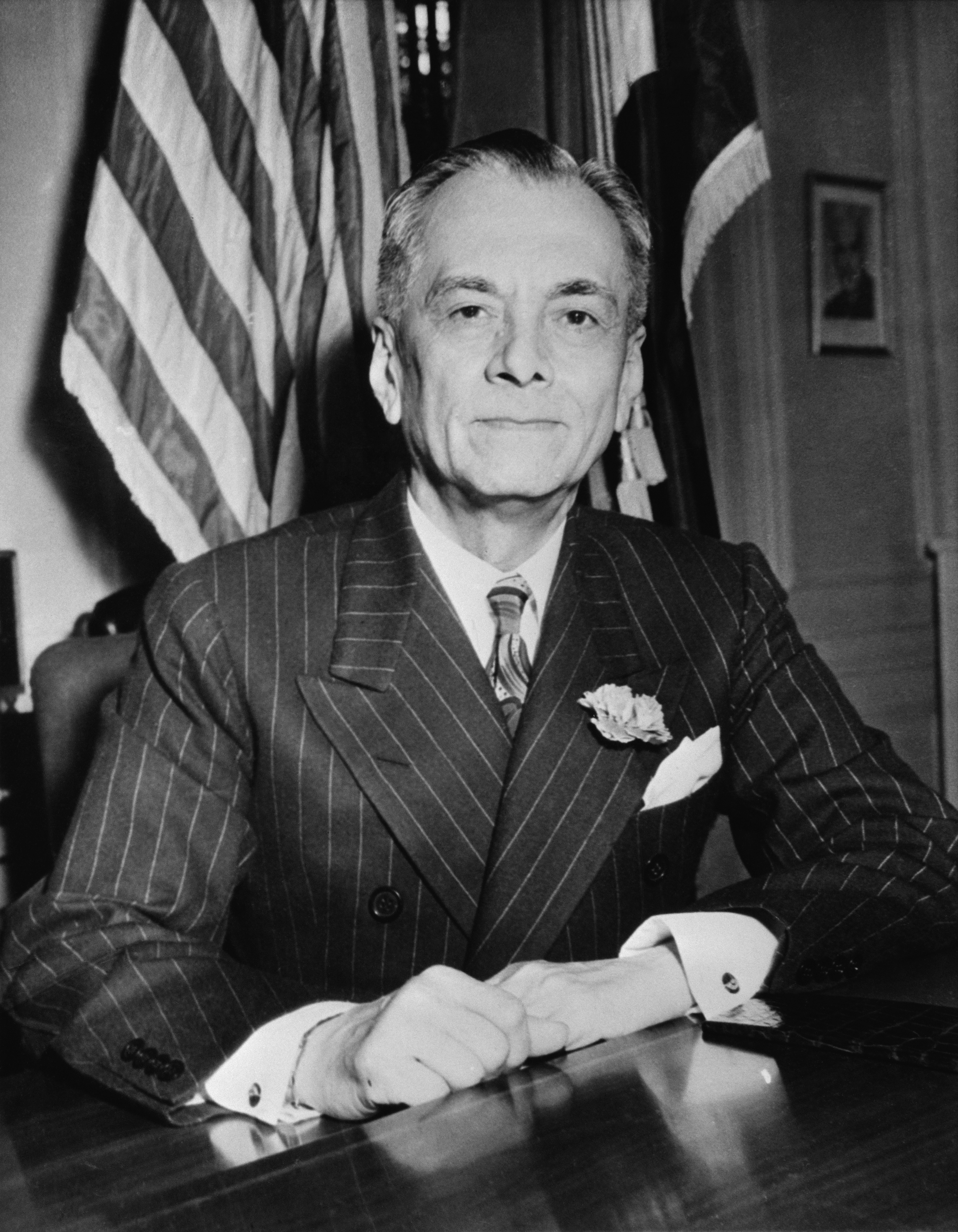
- Formal portrait, 1942

2nd President of the Philippines
- In office 15 November 1935 – 1 August 1944 Serving with José P. Laurel (1943–1944) (Note: Laurel was president of the Second Philippine Republic, a puppet government set up by Imperial Japan, while Quezon was president of the government in exile. Laurel's presidency was retroactively recognized by succeeding Philippine governments.)
- Vice President: Sergio Osmeña
- Preceded by: Emilio Aguinaldo (as Philippine president); Frank Murphy (as Governor-General)
- Succeeded by: Sergio Osmeña; Jose P. Laurel (de facto)

Secretary of National Defense
- Acting; 16 July 1941 – 11 December 1941
- President: Himself
- Preceded by: Teófilo Sison
- Succeeded by: Jorge B. Vargas

Mayor of Quezon City
- Acting; 12 October 1939 – 4 November 1939
- Vice Mayor: Vicente Fragante
- Preceded by: Position established
- Succeeded by: Tomás Morató

15th Secretary of Public Instruction
- In office 1 December 1938 – 19 April 1939
- President: Himself
- Preceded by: Sergio Osmeña
- Succeeded by: Jorge Bocobo
Political offices 1906‍–‍1935
1st President of the Senate of the Philippines
In office 16 October 1916 – 15 November 1935
Succeeded by	Gil Montilla (National Assembly Speaker); Manuel Roxas (Senate President)
Senator of the Philippines from the 5th district
In office 16 October 1916 – 15 November 1935
Preceded by	Position established
Succeeded by	Position abolished
Resident Commissioner to the U.S. House of Representatives from the Philippine Islands
In office 23 November 1909 – 15 October 1916
Preceded by	Pablo Ocampo
Succeeded by	Teodoro R. Yangco
Assembly Majority Leader
In office 16 October 1907 – 23 November 1909
Succeeded by	Alberto Barretto
Member of the Philippine Assembly from Tayabas's 1st district
In office 16 October 1907 – 15 May 1909
Preceded by	District established
Succeeded by	Filemon Pérez
4th Governor of Tayabas
In office 1906–1907
Preceded by	Ricardo G. Parás
Succeeded by	Alfredo Castro
Member of the Lucena Municipal Council
In office 1906
Other roles and positions
2nd President of the Nacionalista Party
In office 1935–1944
Preceded by	Sergio Osmeña
Succeeded by	Sergio Osmeña
President of the Philippine Amateur Athletic Federation
In office 1916–1935
Preceded by	William Cameron Forbes
Succeeded by	Jorge B. Vargas

Personal details
- Born: Manuel Luis Quezon y Molina; 19 August 1878 Baler, El Príncipe, Nueva Écija, Captaincy General of the Philippines, Spanish East Indies (now Baler, Aurora, Philippines)
- Died: 1 August 1944 (aged 65) Saranac Lake, New York, U.S.
- Cause of death: Tuberculosis
- Resting place: Arlington National Cemetery, Arlington County, Virginia (1944–1946); Manila North Cemetery, Santa Cruz, Manila, Philippines (1946–1979); Quezon Memorial Shrine, Quezon City, Philippines (since 1979)
- Party: Nacionalista (1907–1944)
- Spouse: Aurora Aragon (m. 1918)
- Children: 4
- Relatives: Manuel L. Quezon III (grandson)
- Education: University of Santo Tomas; Colegio de San Juan de Letran

Military service
- Allegiance: First Philippine Republic; (Commonwealth of the Philippines) Philippine Commonwealth; United States
- Branch/service: Philippine Republican Army; Philippine Commonwealth Army
- Years of service: 1899–1900; 1941–1944
- Rank: Commander-in-Chief; Major
- Battles/wars: Philippine–American War World War II: Philippines campaign (1941–1942); Japanese occupation of the Philippines
- Manuel Quezon's voice Speech as senate president commenting on the passage of the Tydings-McDuffie Act (Recorded in 1934)

Manuel Luis Quezon y Molina (Note: UK: /ˈkeɪzɒn/, US: /ˈkeɪsɒn, -sɔːn, -soʊn/, Tagalog: [maˈnwel luˈis ˈkɛson], Spanish: [maˈnwel ˈlwis ˈkeson]) GCGH KGCR (19 August 1878 – 1 August 1944), also known by his initials MLQ, was a Filipino lawyer, statesman, soldier, and politician who served as the second president of the Philippines from 1935 until his death in 1944. He was the first Filipino to head a government of the entire Philippines and is considered the second president of the Philippines after Emilio Aguinaldo (1899–1901), whom Quezon defeated in the 1935 presidential election. Quezon City, a city in Metro Manila and Quezon Province, are named after him.

During his presidency, Quezon tackled the problem of landless peasants. Other major decisions included the reorganization of the islands' military defense, approval of a recommendation for government reorganization, the promotion of settlement and development in Mindanao, dealing with the foreign stranglehold on Philippine trade and commerce, proposals for land reform, and opposing graft and corruption within the government. He established a government in exile in the United States with the outbreak of World War II and the threat of Japanese invasion. Scholars have described Quezon's leadership as a "de facto dictatorship" and described him as "the first Filipino politician to integrate all levels of politics into a synergy of power" after removing his term limits as president and turning the Senate into an extension of the executive through constitutional amendments.

== Early life and education ==
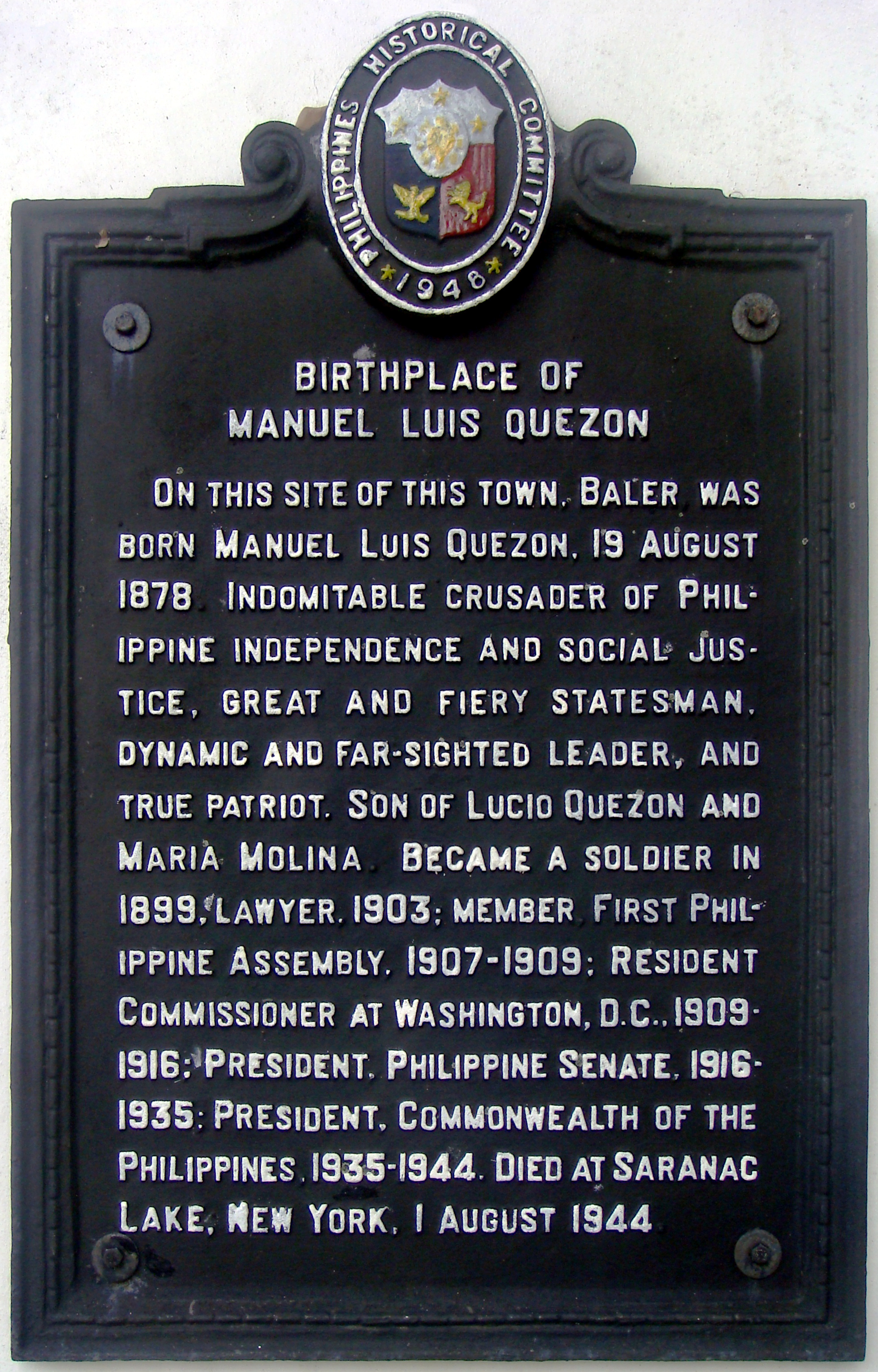
National historical marker installed in 1948 in Baler at the site of his birthplace.

Quezon was born on 19 August 1878 in Baler in the district of El Príncipe, then part of Nueva Écija (now Baler, Aurora). His parents were Lucio Quezon Urbina (1850–1898) and María Dolores Molina (1840–1893). Both were primary-school teachers, although his father was a retired sargento of the Guardia Civil (sergeant of the colonial gendarmerie).

According to historian Augusto de Viana in his timeline of Baler, Quezon's father was a Chinese mestizo who came from the Parián (a Chinatown outside Intramuros) in Paco, Manila. He spoke Spanish in the Civil Guard and married María, a Spanish mestiza sired by the Spanish priest José Urbina de Esparragosa. Urbina had come to Baler to serve as its parish priest in 1847 from Esparragosa de la Serena, Cáceres Province, Spain. Quezon is Chinese mestizo surname originally from Hokkien Chinese spelled in Spanish orthography used in the colonial period, possibly from the Chinese: 雞孫; Pe̍h-ōe-jī: ke-sun, with Chinese: 雞; Pe̍h-ōe-jī: ke and Chinese: 孫; Pe̍h-ōe-jī: sun; lit. 'grandson'; many Filipino surnames that end with "-zon", "-son", and "-chon" as the Hispancised form of the Hokkien Chinese: 孫; Pe̍h-ōe-jī: sun; lit. 'grandson'.

He later boarded at the Colegio de San Juan de Letrán, where he graduated from secondary school in 1894. Lucio and Quezon's brother Pedro were later killed in 1898 by road bandits disguised as government officials on the way to Baler.

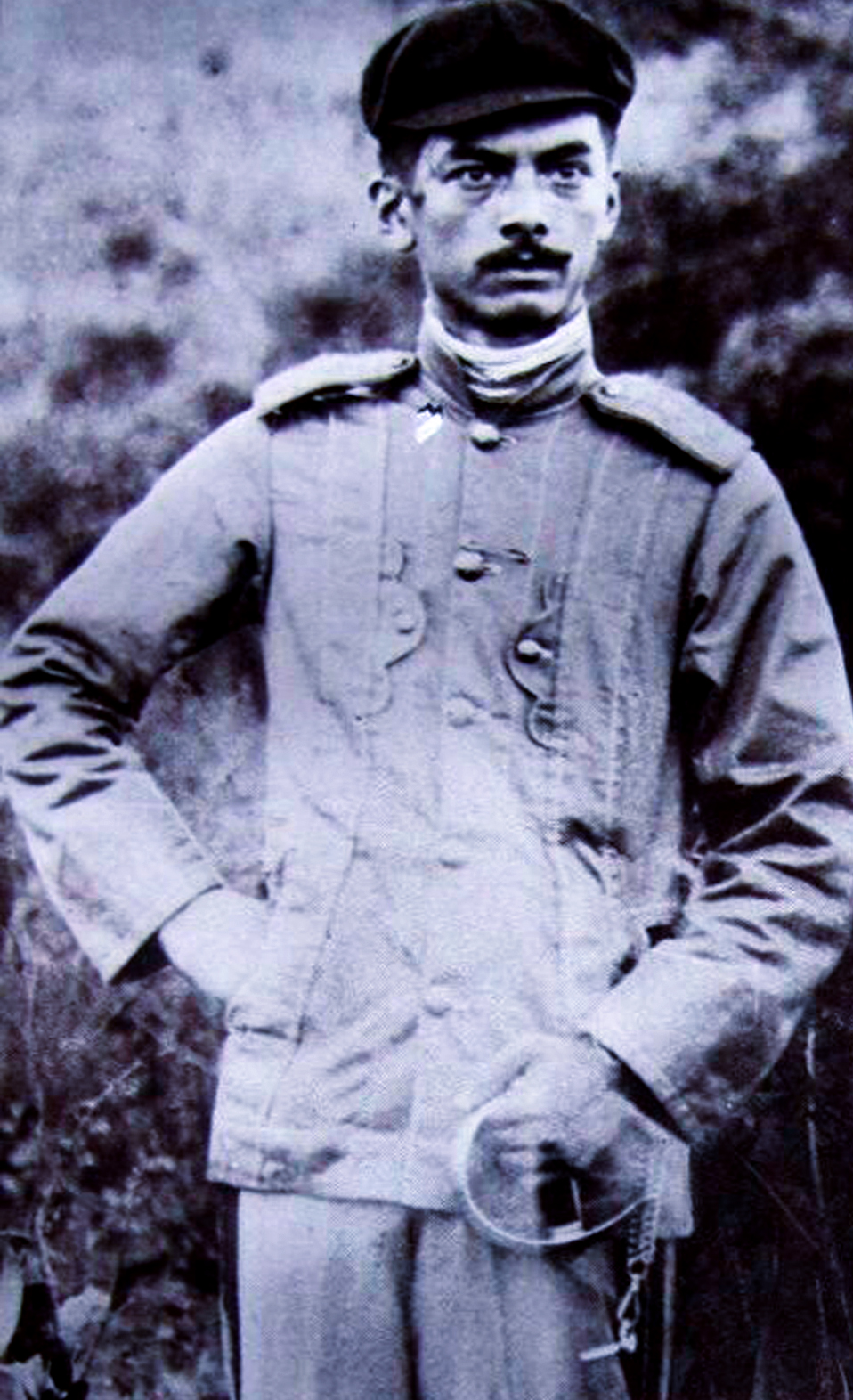
Quezon as aide-de-camp of President Emilio Aguinaldo

In 1899, Quezon left his law studies at the University of Santo Tomas to join the Filipino war effort, and joined the Republican army during the Philippine–American War. He was an aide-de-camp to Emilio Aguinaldo. Quezon became a major, and fought in the Bataan sector. After surrendering in 1900, he returned to university and passed the 1903 bar examinations.

Quezon worked for a time as a clerk and surveyor, entering government service as treasurer for Mindoro and (later) his home province of Tayabas. He became a municipal councilor of Lucena, and was elected governor of Tayabas in 1906.

== Congressional career ==
=== House of Representatives (1907–1916) ===
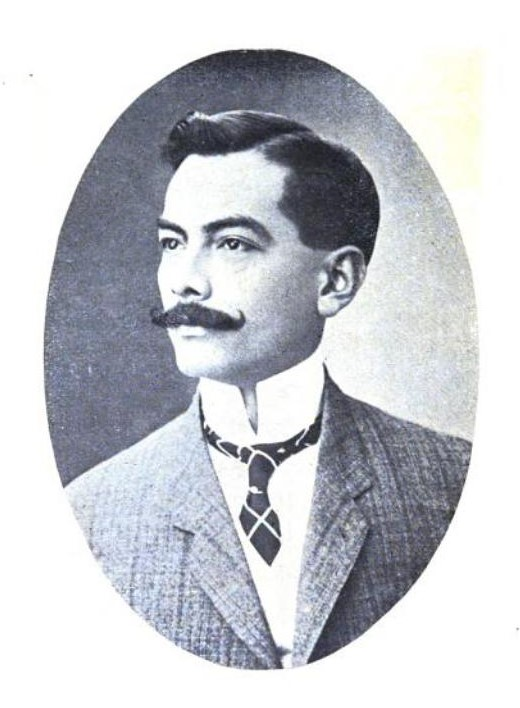
Quezon as a member of the Philippine Assembly, 1908

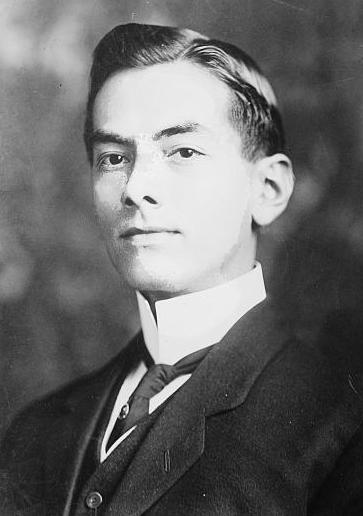
Quezon as Resident Commissioner of the Philippines

Quezon was elected in 1907 to represent Tayabas's 1st district in the first Philippine Assembly (which later became the House of Representatives) during the 1st Philippine Legislature, where he was majority floor leader and chairman of the committees on rules and appropriations. Quezon told the U.S. House of Representatives during a 1914 discussion of the Jones Bill that he received most of his primary education at the village school established by the Spanish government as part of the Philippines' free public-education system. Months before his term ended, he gave up his seat at the Philippine Assembly upon being appointed as one of the Philippines' two resident commissioners. Quezon aimed for the Resident Commissioner seat in 1909, which was held by Nacionalista Pablo Ocampo. He won decisively with 61 out of 71 votes, while Ocampo received four votes, and a third candidate got none.

Quezon arrived in Washington, D.C., in December 1909 and made his residence in Champlain Apartment House. Due to him not being well-versed in the English language, he hired a tutor and self-studied a Spanish–English dictionary. During his time in the US, he received the nickname "Casey" among his American friends.

He served two terms as resident commissioner from 1909 to 1916, he lobbied for the passage of the Philippine Autonomy Act (the Jones Law).

==== Controversy with Benito Legarda ====
In the fall of 1910, disagreements between Benito Legarda and Quezon, and between the Philippine Commission and the Philippine Assembly, caused issues for their re-elections as resident commissioners. The assembly did not certify Legarda's nomination because he was against immediate independence of the Philippines, leading the commission to reject Quezon's candidacy. After months of failed attempts to resolve the problem, the House extended their terms until October 1912. In November 1912, Quezon suggested Manuel Earnshaw to replace retiring Legarda, and Quezon was re-elected.

=== Senate (1916–1935) ===
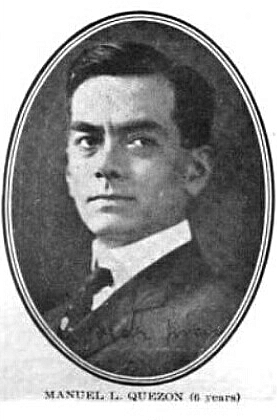
Portrait of Quezon as a Senator, from the Philippine Education (1917)

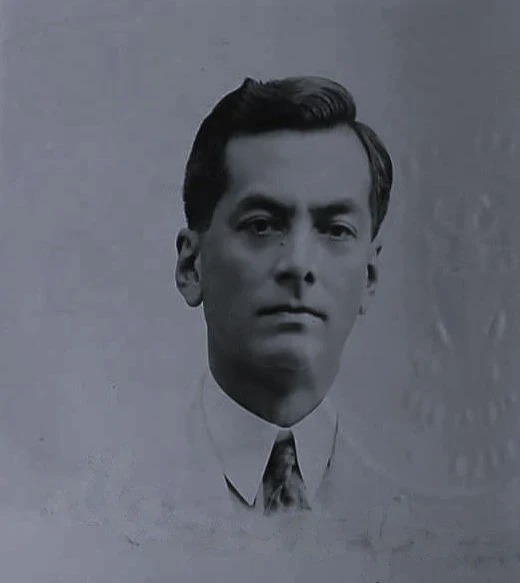
Quezon in 1918

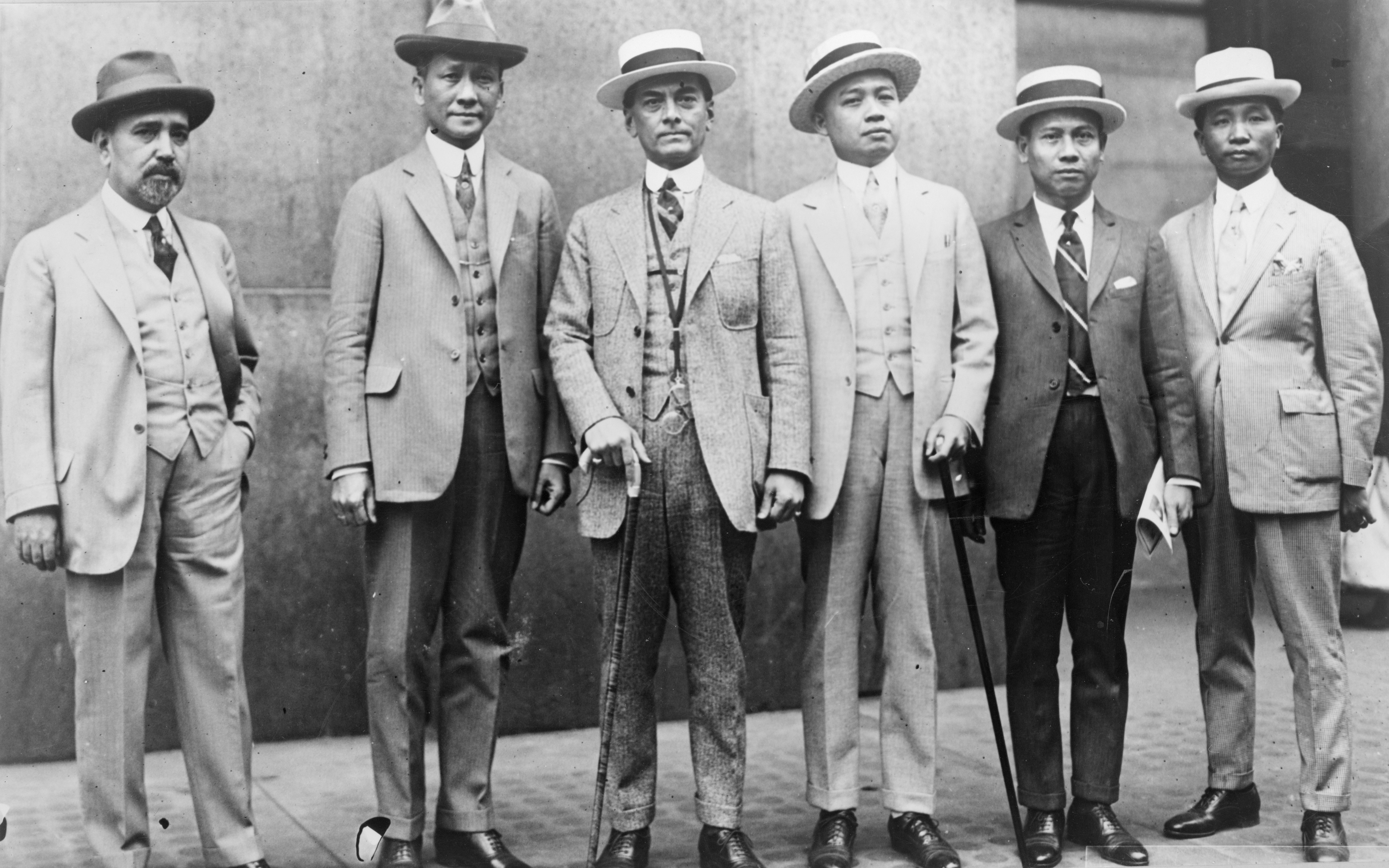
Senate President Quezon (third from left) with representatives of the Philippine Independence Mission in 1924

On 14 October 1916, Quezon received the highest number of votes for the Fifth Senatorial District and was confirmed Senator-elect by Governor-General Francis Burton Harrison under Executive Order No. 73. Due to the passage of the Jones Law, he resigned as resident commissioner on 15 October 1916. A farewell banquet was organized for him at the Willard Hotel by his friends and acquaintances in Washington. He then returned to Manila. On 16 October 1916, the new Philippine Legislature under the Jones Law was inaugurated. That same day, the new bicameral legislature convened with Quezon being elected Senate President. He served continuously until 1935 (19 years), the longest tenure in history until Senator Lorenzo Tañada's four consecutive terms (24 years, from 1947 to 1972). Quezon headed the first independent mission to the U.S. Congress in 1919, and secured passage of the Tydings–McDuffie Act in 1934.

==== Rivalry with Osmeña ====
In 1921, Quezon made a public campaign against House Speaker Sergio Osmeña accusing him of being an autocratic leader and blamed him for the Philippine National Bank's financial mess. Both Osmeña and Quezon debated on this until 1922. As a result, the Nationalista Party was split into two. Quezon also resigned as Senate President that same year in January.

In 1922, he became leader of the Nacionalista Party alliance Partido Nacionalista-Colectivista. As Osmeña joined the 1922 Senate elections, Quezon's faction won. The party once again reunited with Quezon as senate president and Osmeña as senate president pro tempore.

In 1933, both Quezon and Osmeña clashed regarding the ratification of the Hare–Hawes–Cutting bill in the Philippine Legislature. As a result of the HHC controversy, Quezon's faction gained more support and won against Osmeña's faction in the 1934 senate elections.

==== Relations with China ====
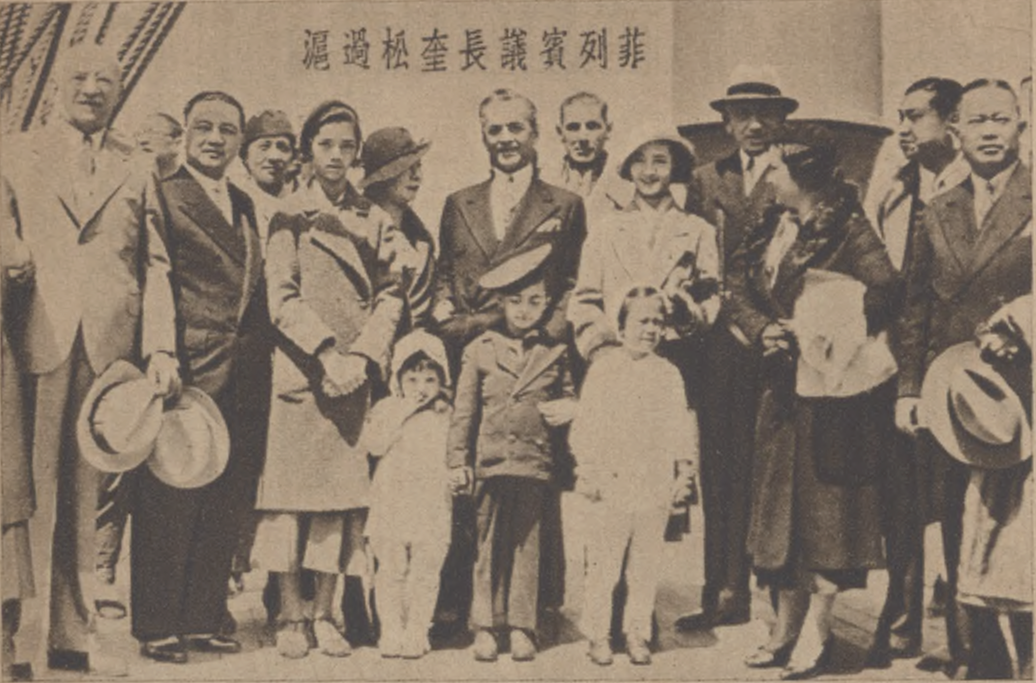
Quezon's visit in Shanghai, 1934.

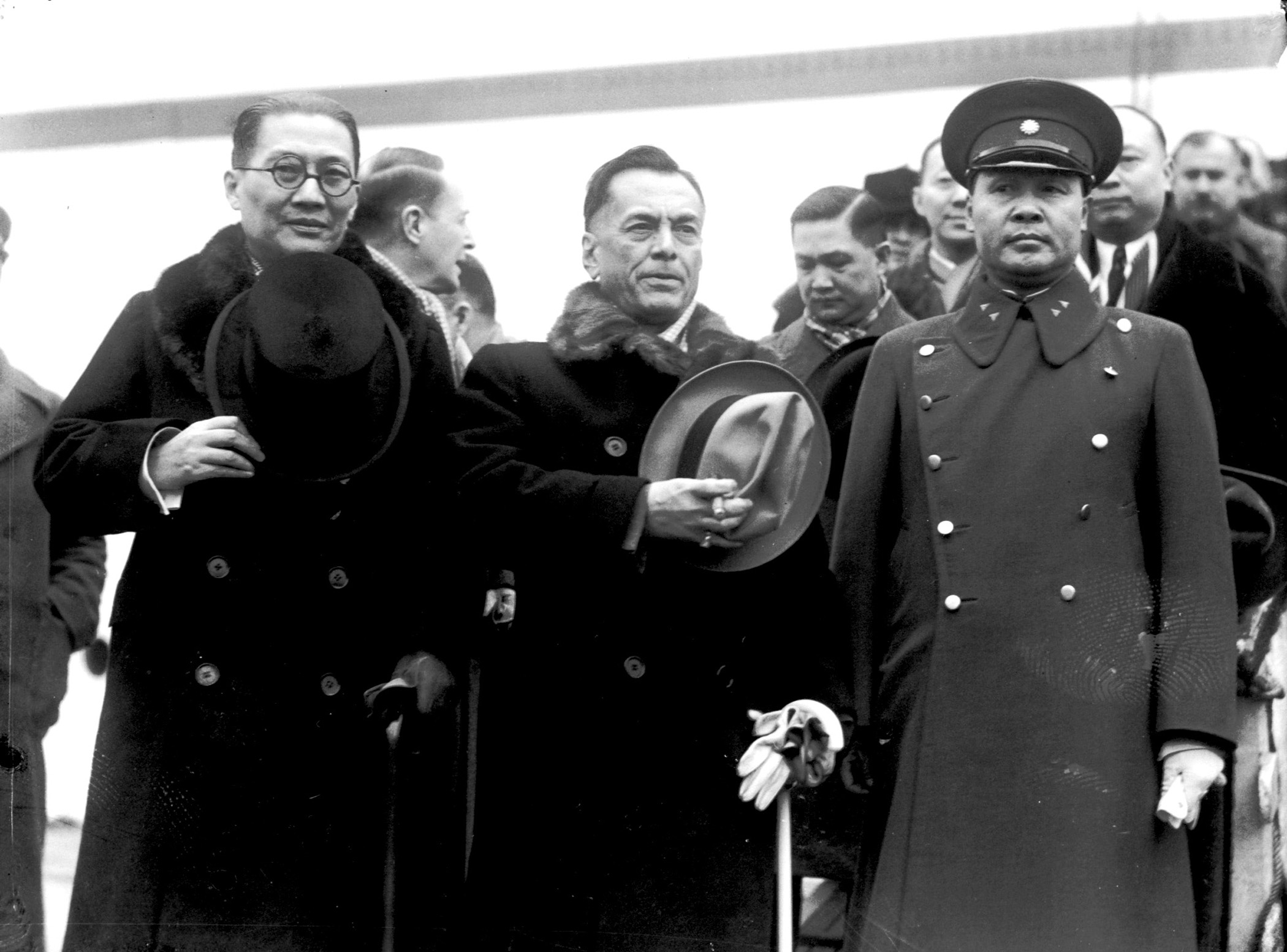
Quezon with Shanghai Mayor Wu Tiecheng (left).

On 9 July 1927, Quezon made his visit to Shanghai where he met with the wealthy elites. In his banquet speech: "I believe that the cause of Nationalist China is the cause of humanity. I think that it is only through the recognition of the fundamental principles of the rights of every nation to be free and independent and on an equal footing with other nations on earth that real peace and universal prosperity throughout the world can be established."

After his visit in Shanghai, Quezon then went to Nanjing meeting with Kuomintang leaders such as Chinese general Chiang Kai-shek and Chinese diplomat Hu Hanmin. He returned to the Philippines on 28 July 1927. Upon his return, Quezon urged Filipinos not to cooperate with Chinese nationalists. Quezon believed that having links with China would hinder the Philippines' independence campaign and offend the United States.

== Presidency (1935–1944) ==
Presidential styles of Manuel L. Quezon
- Reference style: His Excellency
- Spoken style: Your Excellency
- Alternative style: Mr. President

=== First term (1935–1941) ===
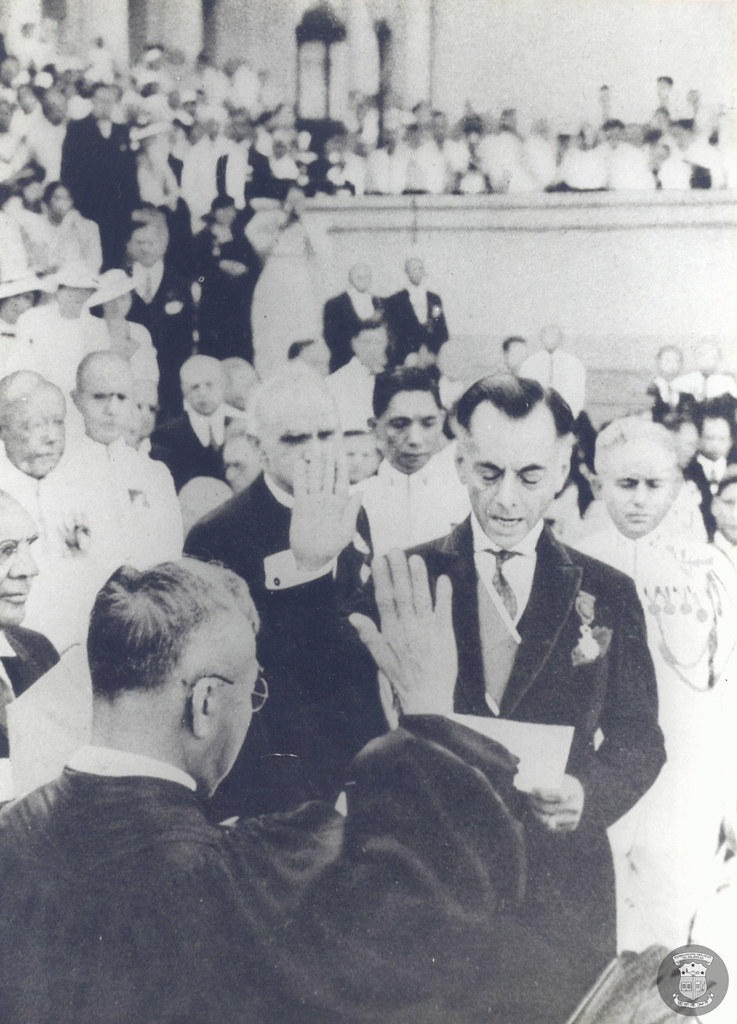
The First inauguration of Philippine Commonwealth President Manuel L. Quezon at the steps of the Legislative Building in Manila on the 15th of November 1935

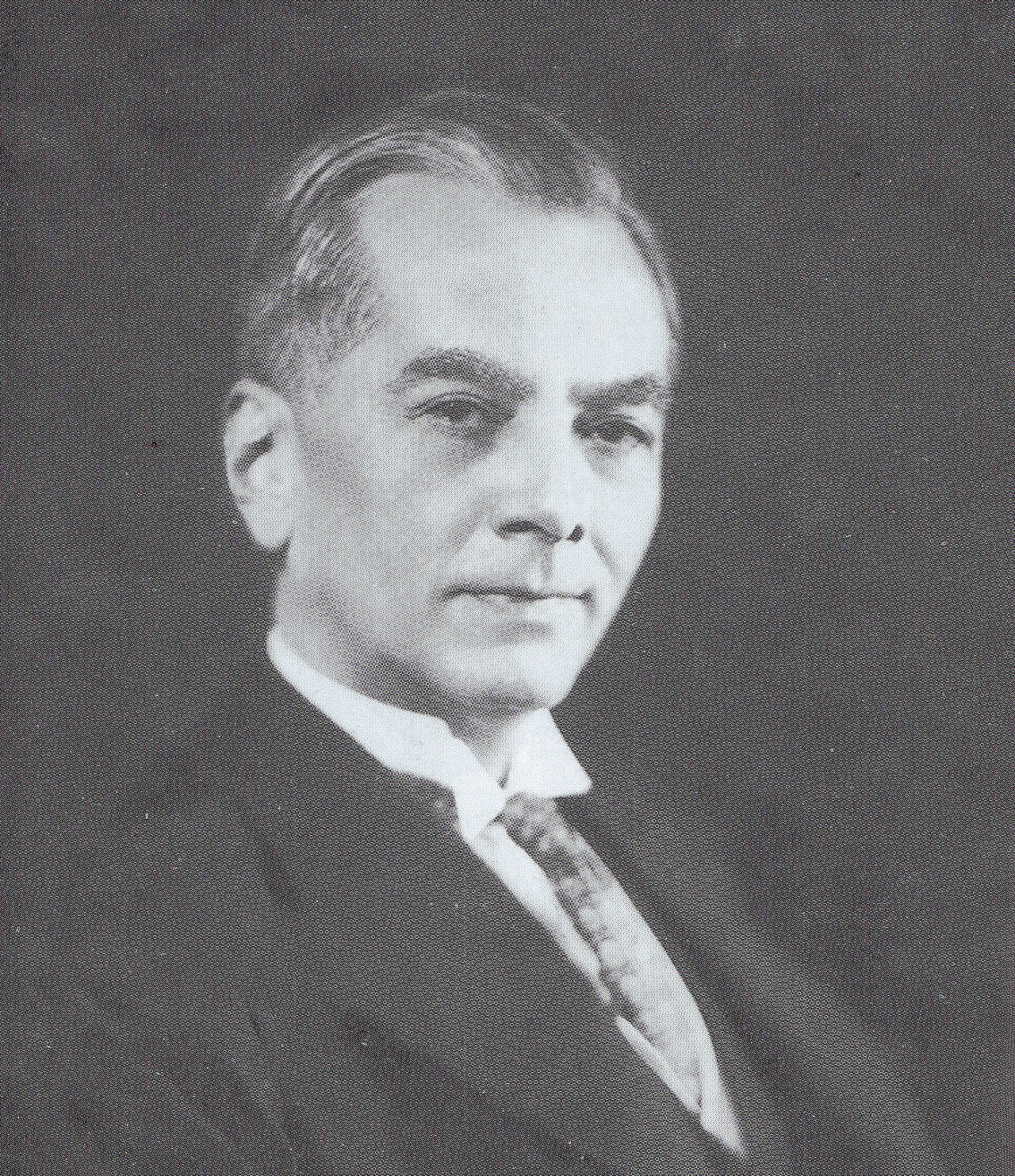
Portrait of Quezon, c. 1935

In 1935, Quezon won the Philippines' first national presidential election under the Nacionalista Party. He received nearly 68 percent of the vote against his two main rivals, Emilio Aguinaldo and Gregorio Aglipay. Quezon, inaugurated on 15 November 1935, is recognized as the second President of the Philippines. In January 2008, however, House Representative Rodolfo Valencia (Oriental Mindoro–1st) filed a bill seeking to declare General Miguel Malvar the second Philippine President; Malvar succeeded Aguinaldo in 1901.

=== National Defense ===
Quezon's administration established the Philippine Commonwealth's national-defense system under the National Defense Act of 1935, which provided for the development of a citizen army through compulsory military training and created the framework for building a Filipino force capable of defending the country.

==== Supreme Court appointments ====
Under the Reorganization Act, Quezon was given the power to appoint the first all-Filipino cabinet in 1935. From 1901 to 1935, a Filipino was chief justice but most Supreme Court justices were Americans. Complete Filipinization was achieved with the establishment of the Commonwealth of the Philippines in 1935. Claro M. Recto and José P. Laurel were among Quezon's first appointees to replace the American justices. Membership in the Supreme Court increased to 11: a chief justice and ten associate justices, who sat en banc or in two divisions of five members each.

- Ramón Avanceña – 1935 (Chief Justice) – 1935–1941
- José Abad Santos – 1935
- Claro M. Recto – 1935–1936
- José P. Laurel – 1935
- José Abad Santos (Chief Justice) – 1941–1942

==== Government reorganization ====
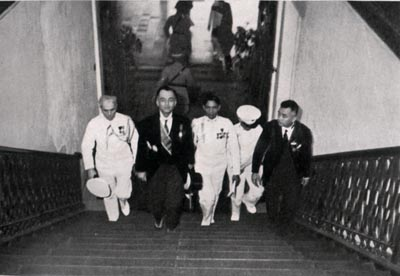
President Manuel L. Quezon climbs up the grand staircase of Malacañang Palace with aide-de-camp Colonel Manuel Nieto and Presidential Guard Battalion Commander Colonel Narciso Manzano.

To meet the demands of the newly established government and comply with the Tydings-McDuffie Act and the Constitution, Quezon, – true to his pledge of "more government and less politics," – initiated a reorganization of the government. He established a Government Survey Board to study existing institutions and, in light of changed circumstances, make necessary recommendations.

Early results were seen with the revamping of the executive department; offices and bureaus were merged or abolished, and others were created. Quezon ordered the transfer of the Philippine Constabulary from the Department of the Interior to the Department of Finance. Other changes were made to the National Defense, Agriculture and Commerce, Public Works and Communications, and Health and Public Welfare departments.

New offices and boards were created by executive order or legislation. Among these were the Council of National Defense, the Board of National Relief, the Mindanao and Sulu Commission, and the Civil Service Board of Appeals.

==== Social justice program ====
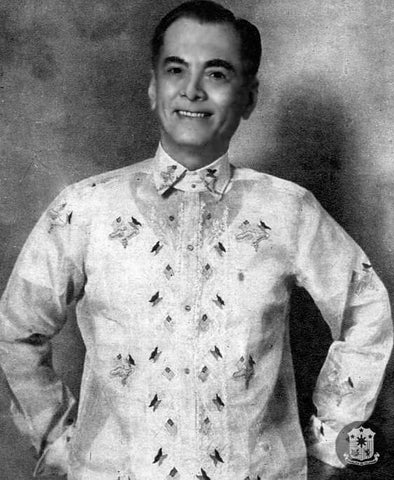
President Quezon wearing his inaugural barong

Pledging to improve the conditions of the Philippine working class and inspired by the social doctrines of Pope Leo XIII and Pope Pius XI and treatises by the world's leading sociologists, Quezon began a program of social justice introduced with executive measures and legislation by the National Assembly. A court for industrial relations was established to mediate disputes, minimizing the impact of strikes and lockouts. A minimum-wage law was enacted, as well as a law providing an eight-hour workday and a tenancy law for Filipino farmers. The position of public defender was created to assist the poor.

Commonwealth Act No. 20 enabled Quezon to acquire large, occupied estates to re-appropriate their lots and homes at a nominal cost and under terms affordable by their residents; one example was the Buenavista estate. He also began a cooperative system of agriculture among owners of the subdivided estates to increase their income. Quezon desired to follow the constitutional mandate on the promotion of social justice.

==== Economy ====
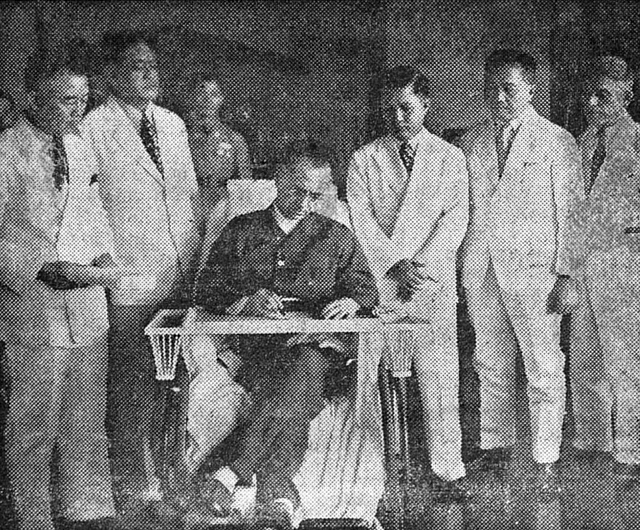
President Manuel L. Quezon signed the budget for the following year in 1937

When the Commonwealth was created, its economy was stable and promising. With foreign trade peaking at ₱400 million, the upward trend in business resembled a boom. Export crops were generally good and, except for tobacco, were in high demand. The value of Philippine exports reached ₱320,896,000, the highest since 1929.

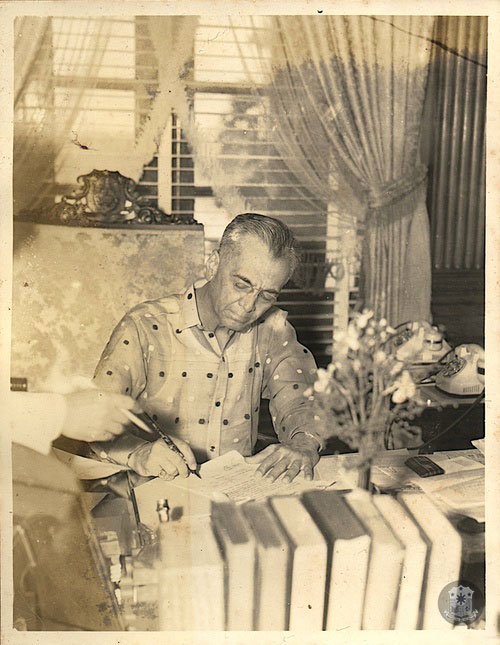
President Quezon at work in the Executive Building (now Kalayaan Hall)

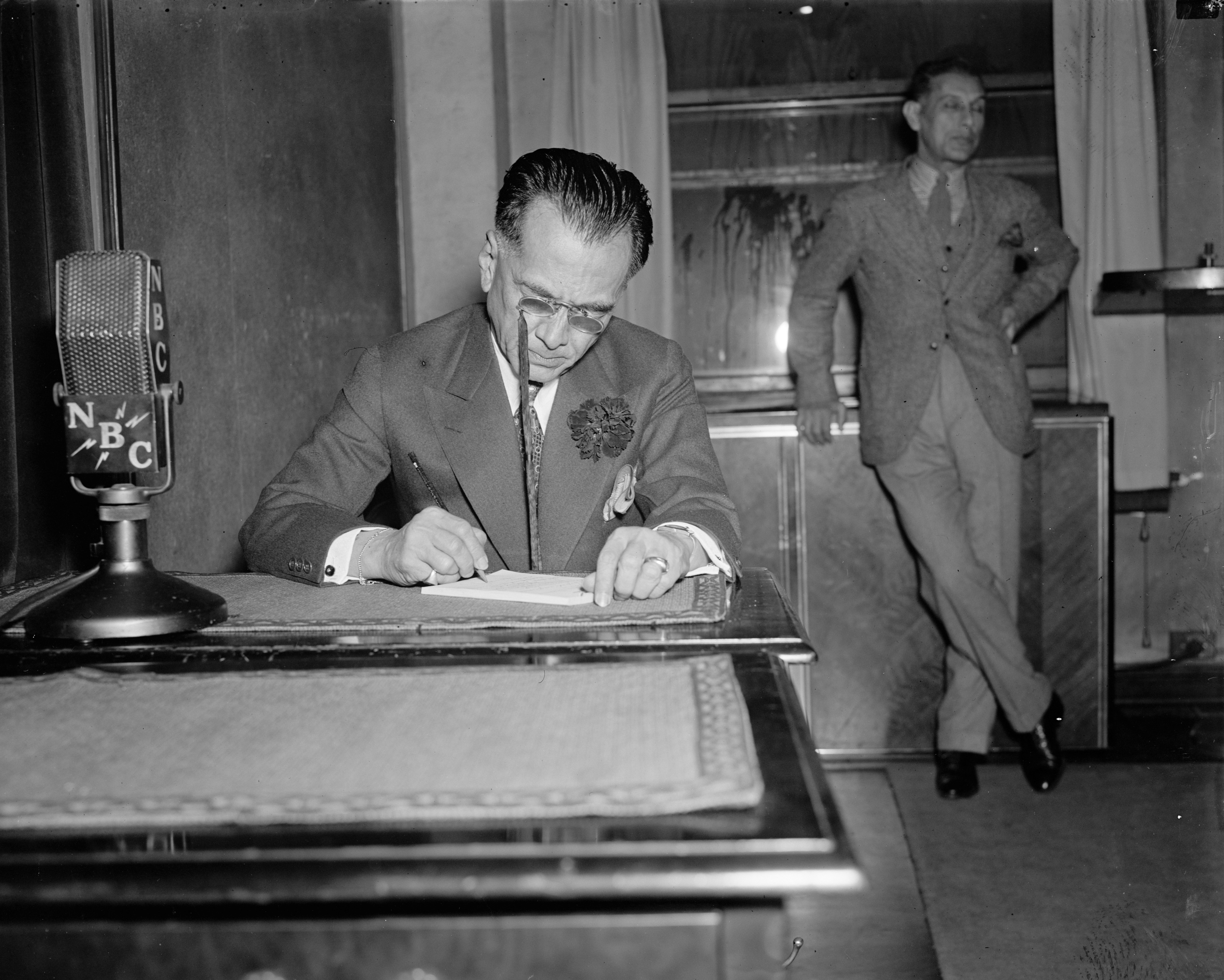
Quezon before a 1937 NBC broadcast

Government revenue in 1936 was ₱76,675,000 (equivalent to ₱34,858,669,716 in 2021), compared to the 1935 revenue of ₱65,000,000 (equivalent to ₱28,793,209,590 in 2021). Government companies, except for the Manila Railroad Company, earned profits. Gold production increased about 37 percent, iron nearly doubled, and cement production increased by about 14 percent.

The government had to address some economic problems, however, and the National Economic Council was created. It advised the government about economic and financial questions, including the promotion of industries, diversification of crops and enterprises, tariffs, taxation, and formulating an economic program in preparation for eventual independence. The National Development Company was reorganized by law, and the National Rice and Corn Company (NARIC) was created with a ₱4 million budget.

Upon the recommendation of the National Economic Council, agricultural colonies were established in Koronadal, Malig, and other locations in Mindanao. The government encouraged migration and settlement in the colonies. The Agricultural and Industrial Bank was established to aid small farmers with convenient loans and affordable terms. Attention was paid to soil surveying and the disposition of public land.

==== Land reform ====
When the commonwealth government was established, Quezon implemented the Rice Share Tenancy Act of 1933 to regulate share-tenancy contracts by establishing minimum standards. The act provided a better tenant-landlord relationship, a 50–50 sharing of the crop, regulation of interest at 10 percent per agricultural year, and protected against arbitrary dismissal by the landlord. Because of a major flaw in the act, however, no petition to apply it was ever presented.

The flaw was that it could be used only when the majority of municipal councils in a province petitioned for it. Since landowners usually controlled such councils, no province ever asked that the law be applied. Quezon ordered that the act be mandatory in all Central Luzon provinces. However, contracts were good for only one year; by refusing to renew their contract, landlords could eject tenants. Peasant organizations clamored in vain for a law which would make a contract automatically renewable as long as tenants fulfilled their obligations. The act was amended to eliminate this loophole in 1936, but it was never carried out; by 1939, thousands of peasants in Central Luzon were threatened with eviction. Quezon's desire to placate both landlords and tenants pleased neither. Thousands of tenants in Central Luzon were evicted from their farmlands by the early 1940s, and the rural conflict was more acute than ever.

During the Commonwealth period, agrarian problems persisted. This motivated the government to incorporate a social-justice principle into the 1935 Constitution. Dictated by the government's social-justice program, expropriation of estates and other landholdings began. The National Land Settlement Administration (NLSA) began an orderly settlement of public agricultural lands. At the outbreak of the Second World War, settlement areas covering over 65,000 hectares (250 sq mi) had been established.

==== Educational reforms ====
With his Executive Order No. 19, dated 19 February 1936, Quezon created the National Council of Education. Rafael Palma, former president of the University of the Philippines, was its first chairman. Funds from the early Residence Certificate Law were devoted to maintaining public schools throughout the country and opening many more. There were 6,511 primary schools, 1,039 intermediate schools, 133 secondary and special schools, and five junior colleges by this time. Total enrollment was 1,262,353, with 28,485 teachers. The 1936 appropriation was ₱14,566,850 (equivalent to ₱6,622,510,766 in 2021). Private schools taught over 97,000 students, and the Office of Adult Education was created.

==== Women's suffrage ====
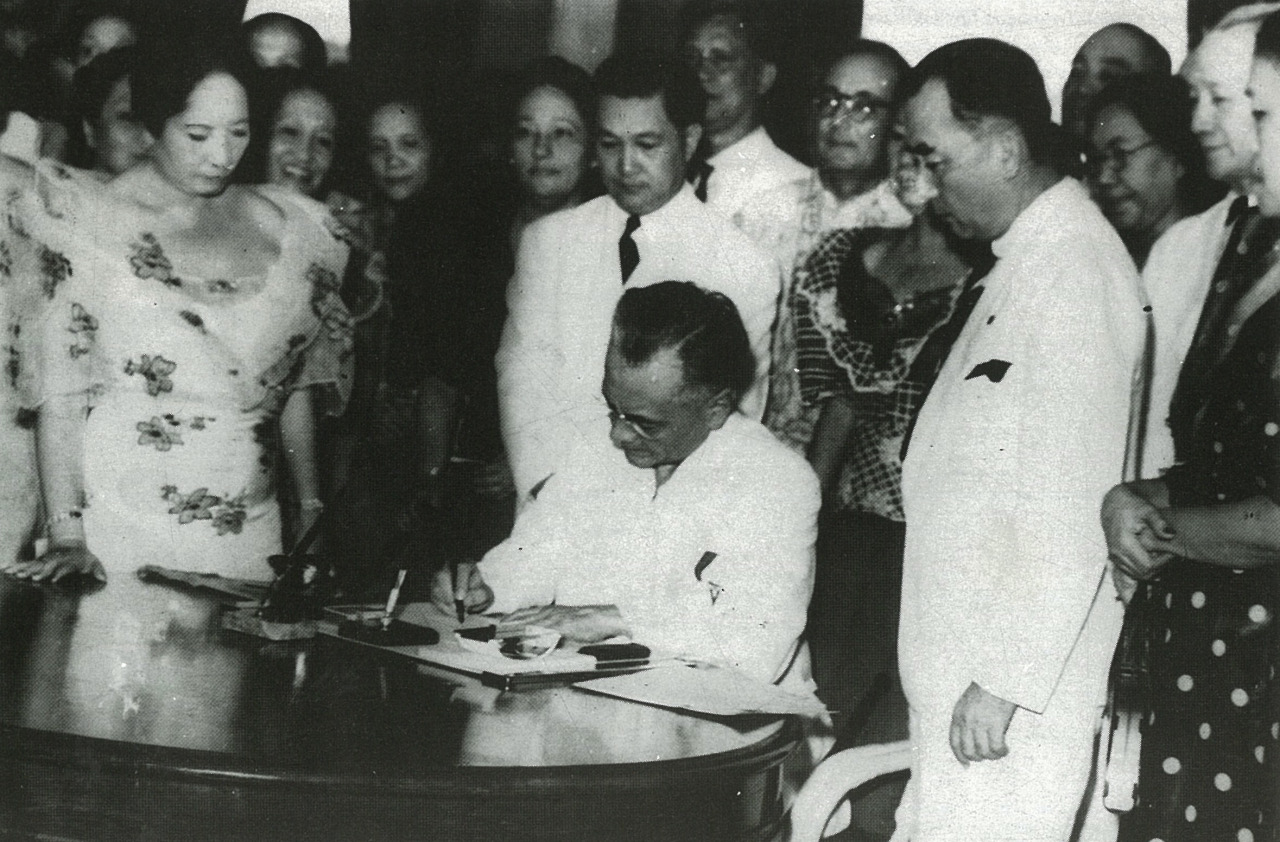
Quezon signing the Women's Suffrage Bill after the 1937 plebiscite

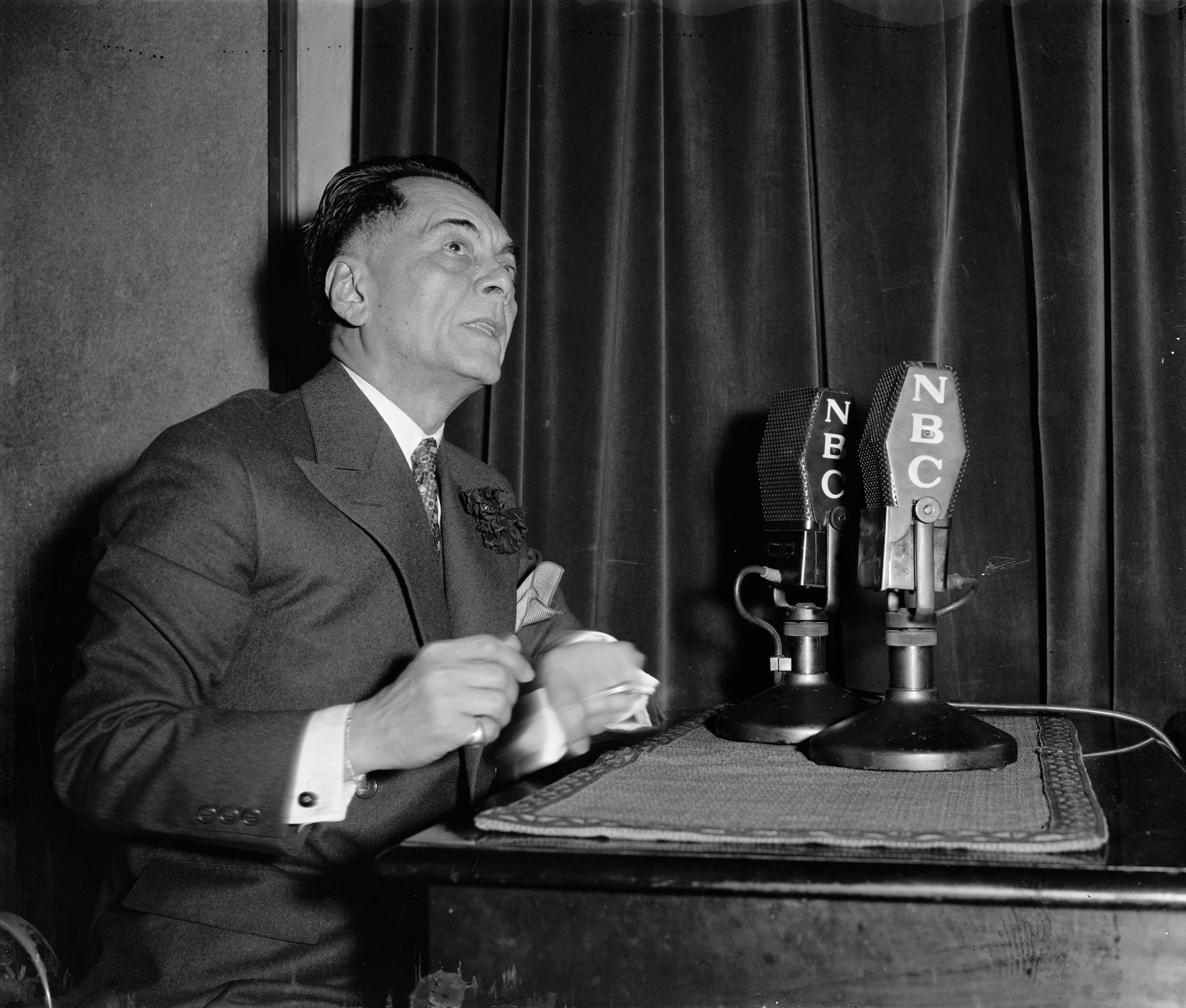
Quezon during a 25-minute broadcast to Manila from Washington, D.C., on 5 April 1937. He discussed women's suffrage and urged that the 10-year independence program be shortened.

Quezon initiated women's suffrage during the Commonwealth era. As a result of prolonged debate between proponents and opponents of women's suffrage, the constitution provided that the issue be resolved by women in a plebiscite. If at least 300,000 women voted for the right to vote, it would be granted. The plebiscite was held on 30 April 1937; there were 447,725 affirmative votes, and 44,307 opposition votes.

==== National language ====
The Philippines' national language was another constitutional question. After a one-year study, the Institute of National Language recommended that Tagalog be the basis for a national language. The proposal was well-received, despite the fact that director Jaime C. de Veyra was Waray, this is because Baler, Quezon's birthplace, is a native Tagalog-speaking area.

In December 1937, Quezon issued a proclamation approving the institute's recommendation and declaring that the national language would become effective in two years. With presidential approval, the INL began work on a Tagalog grammar text and dictionary.

==== Visits to Japan (1937–1938) ====
As Imperial Japan encroached on the Philippines, Quezon antagonized neither the American nor the Japanese officials. He traveled twice to Japan as president, from 31 January to 2 February 1937 and from 29 June to 10 July 1938, to meet with government officials. Quezon emphasized that he would remain loyal to the United States, assuring protection of the rights of the Japanese who resided in the Philippines. Quezon's visits may have signaled the Philippines' inclination to remain neutral in the event of a Japanese-American conflict if the U.S. disregarded the country's concerns.

==== Jewish refugees (1938–1941) ====
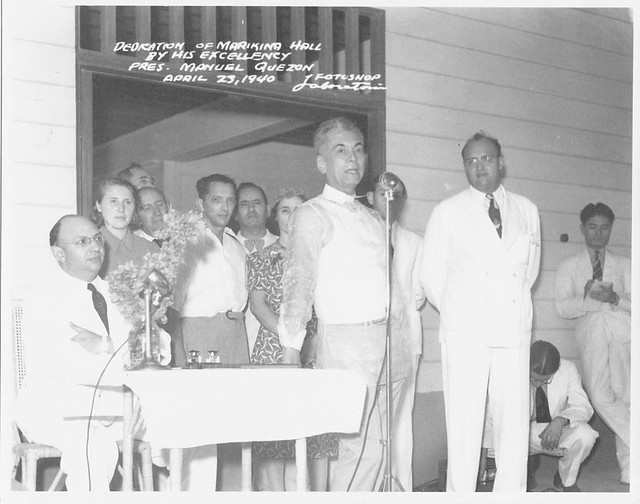
Quezon and the Frieder brothers at the dedication of Marikina Hall for Jewish refugees in 1940

In cooperation with US High Commissioner Paul V. McNutt, Quezon facilitated the entry into the Philippines of Jewish refugees fleeing fascist regimes in Europe and took on critics who were convinced by propaganda that Jewish settlement was a threat to the country. Quezon and McNutt proposed 30,000 refugee families on Mindanao and 30,000–40,000 refugees on Polillo. Quezon made a 10-year loan to Manila's Jewish Refugee Committee of land adjacent to his family home in Marikina to house homeless refugees in Marikina Hall (the present-day Philippine School of Business Administration), which was dedicated on 23 April 1940.

==== Council of State expansion ====
In 1938, Quezon expanded the Council of State in Executive Order No. 144. This highest of advisory bodies to the president would be composed of the President, Vice President, Senate President, House Speaker, Senate President pro tempore, House Speaker pro tempore, the majority floor leaders of both chambers of Congress, former presidents, and three to five prominent citizens.

==== 1938 midterm election ====
The elections for the Second National Assembly were held on 8 November 1938 under a new law which allowed block voting and favored the governing Nacionalista Party. As expected, all 98 assembly seats went to the Nacionalistas. José Yulo, Quezon's Secretary of Justice from 1934 to 1938, was elected speaker.

The Second National Assembly intended to pass legislation strengthening the economy, but the Second World War clouded the horizon; laws passed by the First National Assembly were modified or repealed to meet existing realities. A controversial immigration law which set an annual limit of 50 immigrants per country, primarily affecting Chinese and Japanese nationals escaping the Sino-Japanese War, was passed in 1940. Since the law affected foreign relations, it required the approval of the U.S. president. When the 1939 census was published, the National Assembly updated the apportionment of legislative districts; this became the basis for the 1941 elections.

==== 1939 plebiscite ====
On 7 August 1939, the United States Congress enacted a law in accordance with the recommendations of the Joint Preparatory Commission on Philippine Affairs. Because the new law required an amendment of the Ordinance appended to the Constitution, a plebiscite was held on 24 August 1939. The amendment received 1,339,453 votes in favor, and 49,633 against.

==== Declaration of a national language ====
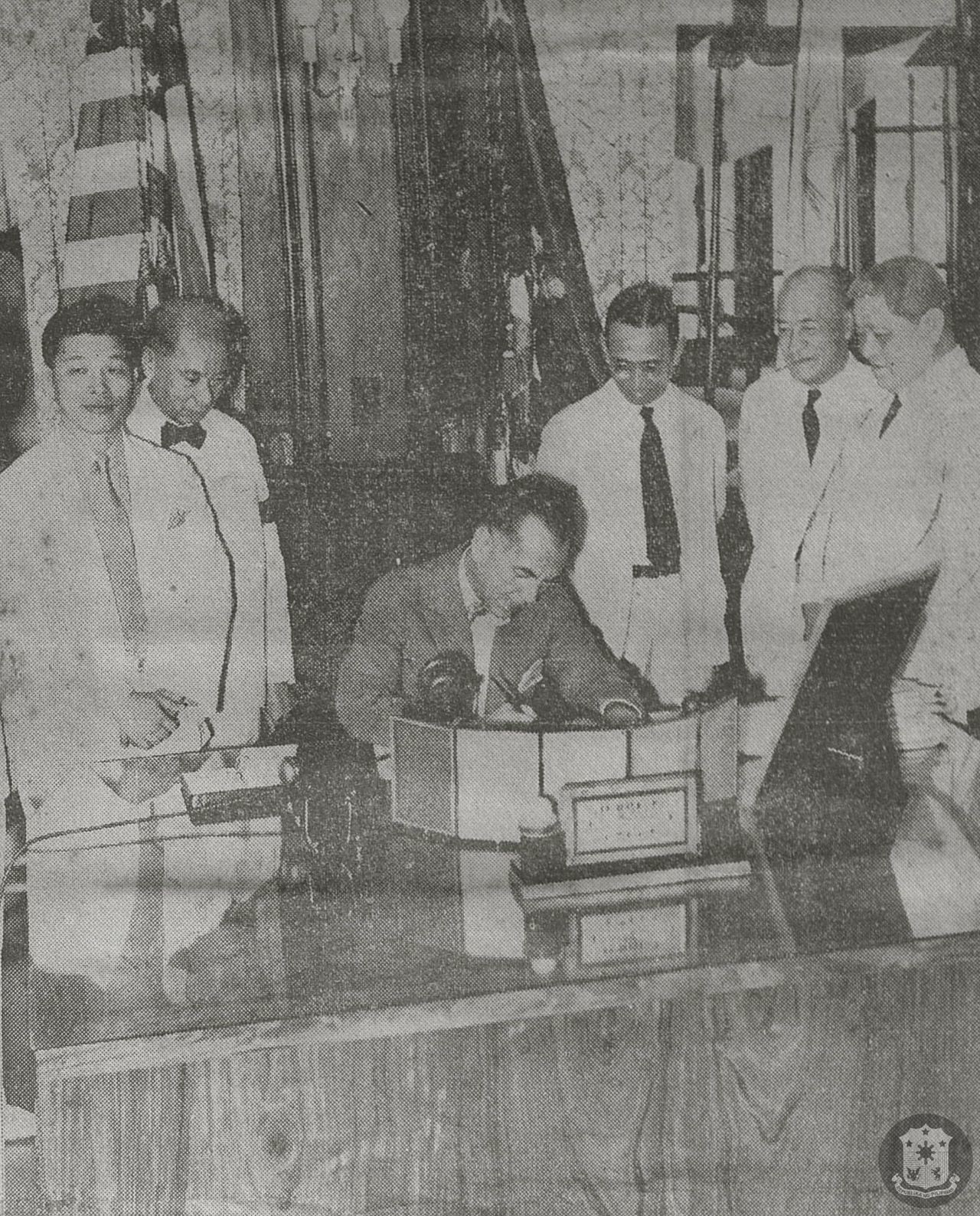
Quezon signs Executive Order No. 134.

Quezon had established the Institute of National Language (INL) to create a national language for the country. On 30 December 1937, in Executive Order No. 134, he declared Tagalog the Philippines' national language; it was taught in schools during the 1940–1941 academic year. The National Assembly later enacted Law No. 570, making the national language an official language with English and Spanish; this became effective on 4 July 1946, with the establishment of the Philippine Republic.

==== 1940 plebiscites ====
With the 1940 local elections, plebiscites were held for proposed amendments to the constitution about a bicameral legislature, the presidential term (four years, with one re-election, and the establishment of an independent Commission on Elections. The amendments were overwhelmingly ratified. Speaker José Yulo and Assemblyman Dominador Tan traveled to the United States to obtain President Franklin D. Roosevelt's approval, which they received on 2 December 1940. Two days later, Quezon proclaimed the amendments.

==== 1941 presidential election ====
Quezon was originally barred by the Philippine constitution from seeking re-election. In 1940, however, a constitutional amendment was ratified which allowed him to serve a second term ending in 1943. In the 1941 presidential election, Quezon was re-elected over former Senator Juan Sumulong with nearly 82 percent of the vote. He was inaugurated on 30 December 1941, at the Malinta Tunnel in Corregidor. The oath of office was administered by Chief Justice of the Supreme Court of the Philippines José Abad Santos. Corregidor was chosen as the venue of the inauguration and temporary seat of the government in-exile to take refuge from the uninterrupted Japanese bombing raids during the Japanese invasion.

=== Second term (1941–1944) ===
==== Pre-war activity ====
As crises mounted in the Pacific, the Philippines prepared for war. Youth military training under General Douglas MacArthur was intensified. The first blackout practice was held on the night of 10 July 1941 in Manila. First aid was taught in all schools and social clubs. Quezon established the Civilian Emergency Administration (CEA) on 1 April 1941, with branches in provinces and towns. Air-raid drills were also held.

The dismal results of the practice blackouts raised concerns of the minimal preparedness in the Philippines. Problems arose when the army and Philippine Constabulary was needed to control the peasant violence throughout the Philippines. In 1942, during Quezon's evacuation in Visayas at Negros Occidental, he spent frustrating hours communicating with officials. Quezon handled disputes between sugar workers and sugar central managers. In one occasion, Quezon ordered the manager of the Binalbagan Sugar Central to obtain money from the Philippine National Bank and pay its employees their salaries. As Binalbagan workers threatened Quezon that they would riot, he ordered the Philippine Constabulary to control the situation.

==== Government in exile ====
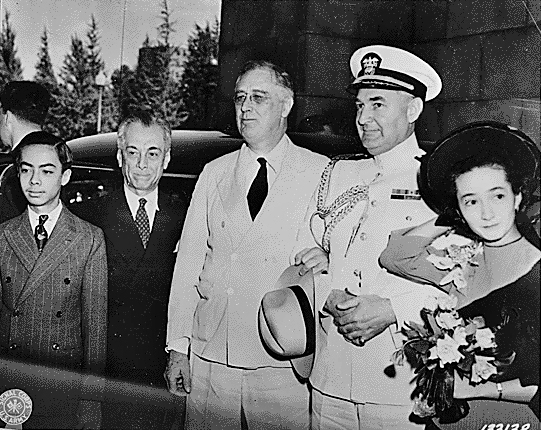
Quezon and his family were welcomed in Washington, D.C. by US President Franklin D. Roosevelt.

After the Japanese invasion of the Philippines during World War II, Quezon evacuated to Corregidor (where he was inaugurated for his second term) and then to the Visayas and Mindanao. At the invitation of the U.S. government, he was evacuated to Australia, and then to the United States. Quezon established the Commonwealth government in exile, with its headquarters in Washington, D.C. He was a member of the Pacific War Council, signed the United Nations declaration against the Axis powers and wrote The Good Fight, his autobiography.

The Good Fight, by Manuel L. Quezon

To conduct government business in exile, Quezon hired the entire floor of one wing of the Shoreham Hotel to accommodate his family and his office. Government offices were established at the quarters of Philippine Resident Commissioner Joaquin Elizalde, who became a member of Quezon's wartime cabinet. Other cabinet appointees were Brigadier-General Carlos P. Romulo as Secretary of the Department of Information and Public Relations and Jaime Hernandez as Auditor General.

Sitting under a canvas canopy outside the Malinta Tunnel on 22 January 1942, Quezon heard a fireside chat during which President Roosevelt said that the Allied forces were determined to defeat Berlin and Rome, followed by Tokyo. Quezon was infuriated, summoned General MacArthur and asked him if the US would support the Philippines; if not, Quezon would return to Manila and allow himself to become a prisoner of war. MacArthur replied that if the Filipinos fighting the Japanese learned that he returned to Manila and became a Japanese puppet, they would consider him a turncoat.

Quezon then heard another broadcast by former president Emilio Aguinaldo urging him and his fellow Filipino officials to yield to superior Japanese forces. Quezon wrote a message to Roosevelt saying that he and his people had been abandoned by the US and it was Quezon's duty as president to stop fighting. MacArthur learned about the message, and ordered Major General Richard Marshall to counterbalance it with American propaganda whose purpose was the "glorification of Filipino loyalty and heroism".

On 2 June 1942, Quezon addressed the United States House of Representatives about the necessity of relieving the Philippine front. He did the same to the Senate, urging the senators to adopt the slogan "Remember Bataan". Despite his declining health, Quezon traveled across the US to remind the American people about the Philippine war.

==== Wartime ====
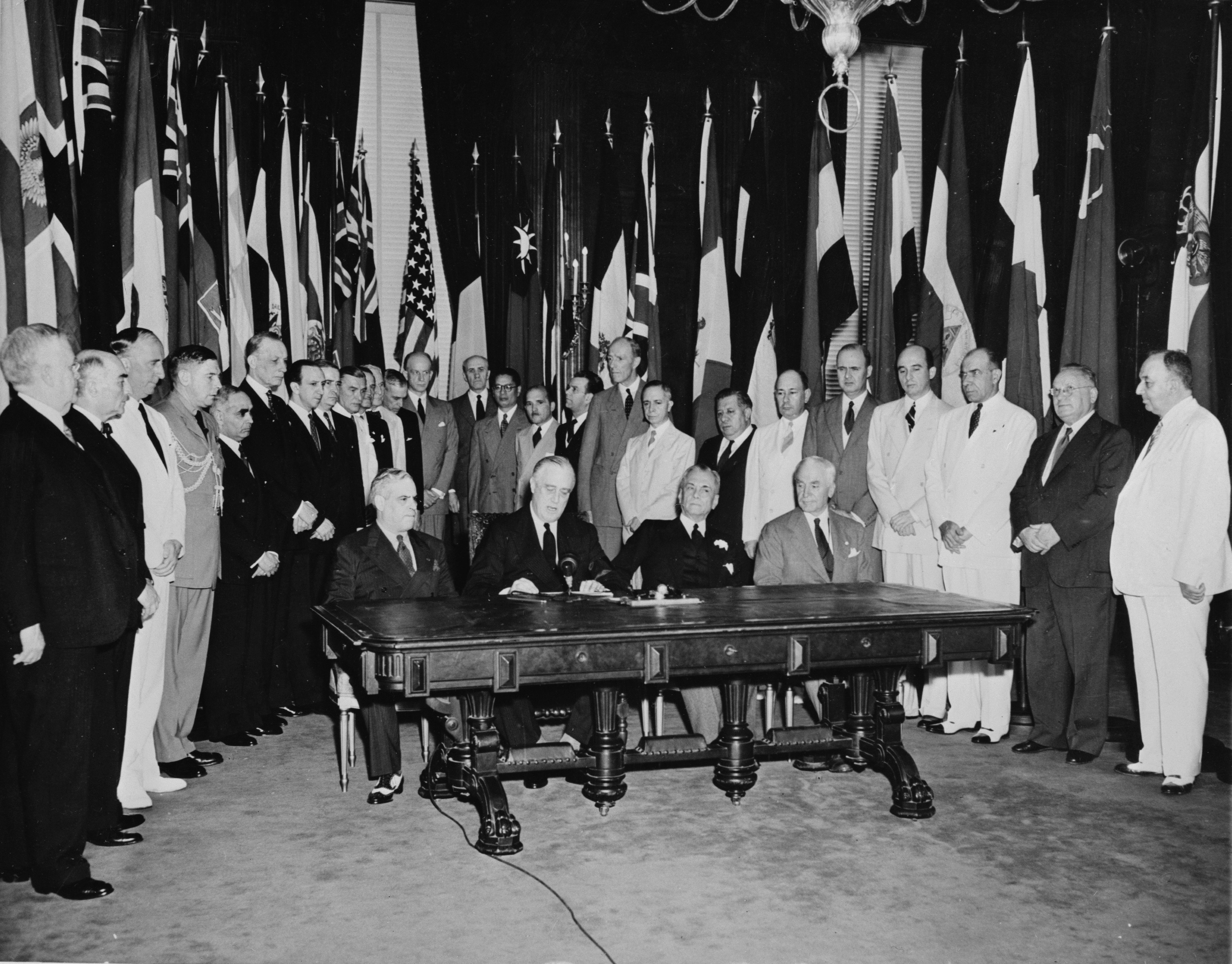
Representatives of 26 Allied nations at a White House Flag Day ceremony reaffirming their pact. Seated left to right: Ambassador Francisco Castillo Nájera of Mexico, President Roosevelt, Quezon, and Secretary of State Cordell Hull.

Quezon broadcast a radio message to Philippine residents in Hawaii, who purchased ₱4 million worth of war bonds, for his first birthday celebration in the United States. Indicating the Philippine government's cooperation with the war effort, he offered the U.S. Army a Philippine infantry regiment which was authorized by the War Department to train in California. Quezon had the Philippine government acquire Elizalde's yacht; renamed Bataan and crewed by Philippine officers and sailors, it was donated to the United States for use in the war.

In early November 1942, Quezon conferred with Roosevelt on a plan for a joint commission to study the post-war Philippine economy. Eighteen months later, the United States Congress passed an act creating the Philippine Rehabilitation Commission.

==== Quezon-Osmeña impasse ====
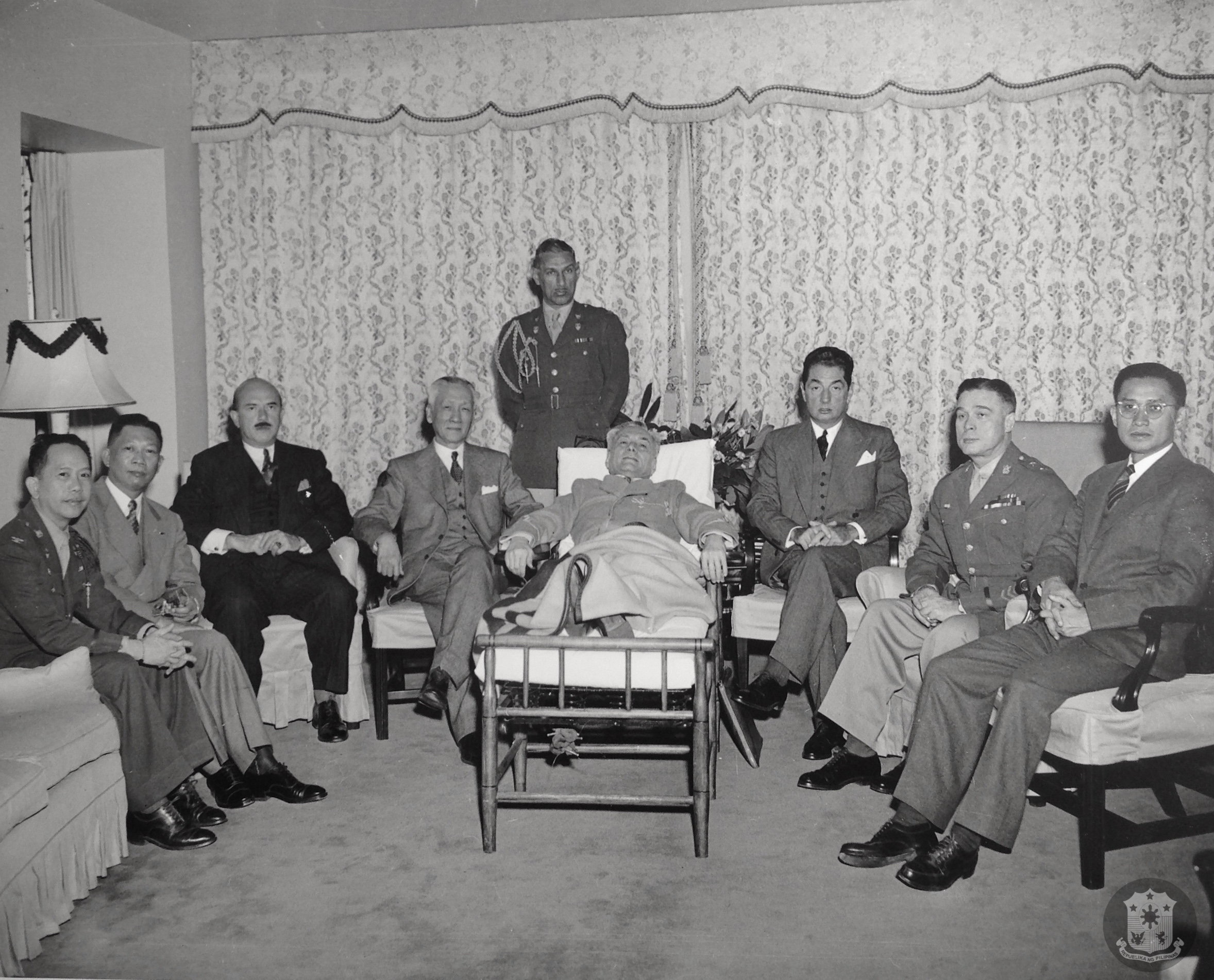
Quezon (center) with his cabinet members in 1944

By 1943, the Philippine government in exile was faced with a crisis. According to the 1935 constitution, Quezon's term would expire on 30 December 1943 and Vice President Sergio Osmeña would succeed him as president. Osmeña wrote to Quezon advising him of this, and Quezon issued a press release and wrote to Osmeña that a change in leadership would be unwise at that time. Osmeña then requested the opinion of US Attorney General Homer Cummings, who upheld Osmeña's view as consistent with the law. Quezon remained adamant, and sought President Roosevelt's decision. Roosevelt remained aloof from the controversy, suggesting that the Philippine officials resolve the impasse.

Quezon convened a cabinet meeting with Osmeña, Resident Commissioner Joaquín Elizalde, Brigadier General Carlos P. Romulo and his cabinet secretaries, Andrés Soriano and Jaime Hernandez. After a discussion, the cabinet supported Elizalde's position in favor of the constitution, and Quezon announced his plan to retire in California.

After the meeting, Osmeña approached Quezon and broached his plan to ask the United States Congress to suspend the constitutional provisions for presidential succession until after the Philippines had been liberated; this legal way out was agreeable to Quezon and his cabinet, and steps were taken to carry out the proposal. Sponsored by Senator Tydings and Congressman Bell, the resolution was unanimously approved by the Senate on a voice vote and passed the House of Representatives by a vote of 181 to 107 on 10 November 1943. He was inaugurated for the third time on 15 November 1943, in Washington, D.C. The oath of office was administered by US Associate Justice Felix Frankfurter.

== Death and burial ==
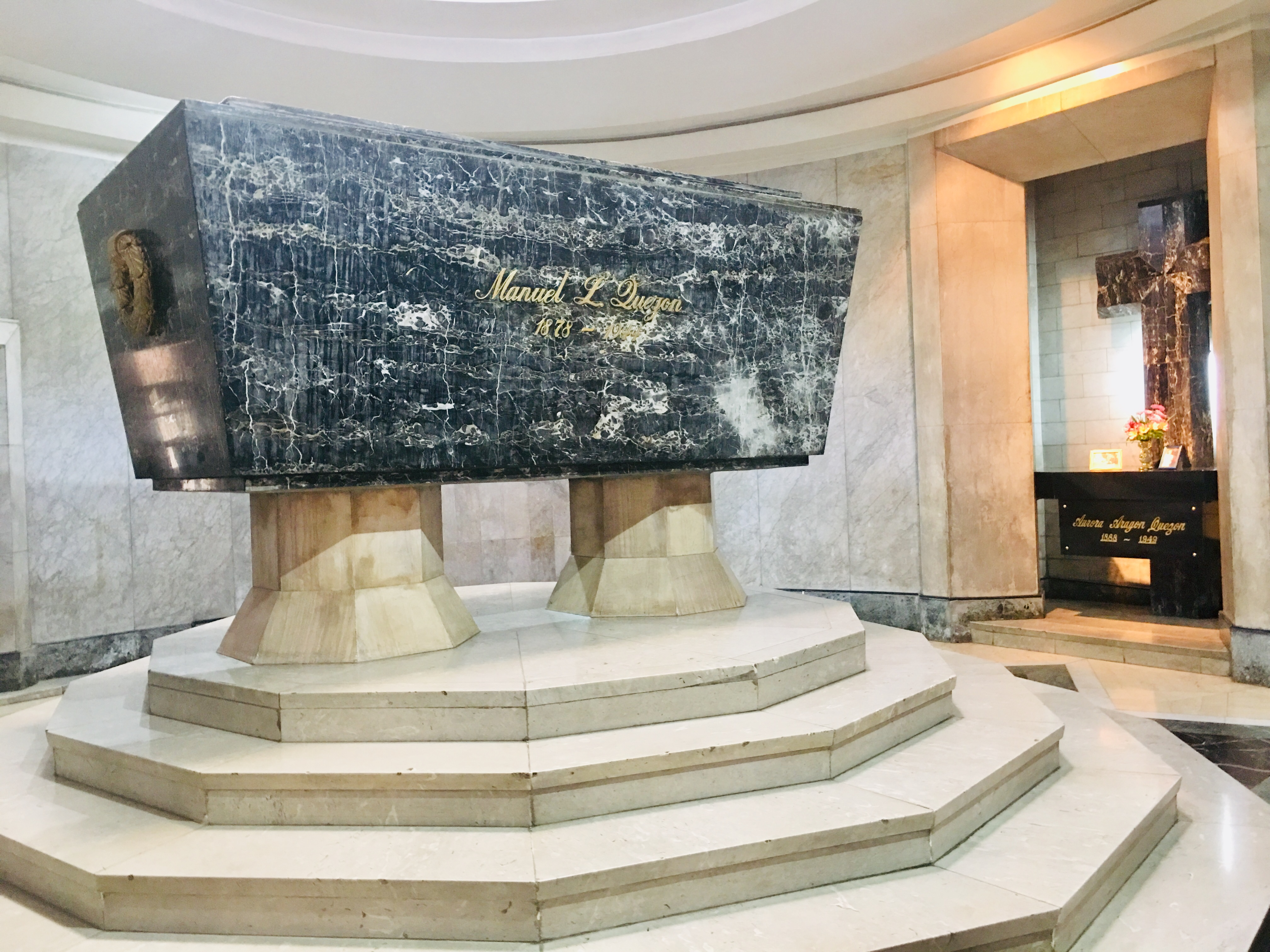
Tomb of President Quezon and his wife Aurora in the Quezon Memorial Shrine

Quezon had developed tuberculosis and spent his last years in hospitals, including a Miami Beach Army hospital in April 1944. That summer, he was at a cure cottage in Saranac Lake, New York. Quezon died there at 10:05 a.m. ET on 1 August 1944, at age 65. His remains were initially buried in Arlington National Cemetery, but his body was brought by former Governor-General and High Commissioner Frank Murphy aboard the USS Princeton and re-interred in the Manila North Cemetery on 17 July 1946. Those were then moved to a miniature copy of Napoleon's tomb at the Quezon Memorial Shrine in Quezon City, on 1 August 1979.

== Electoral history ==
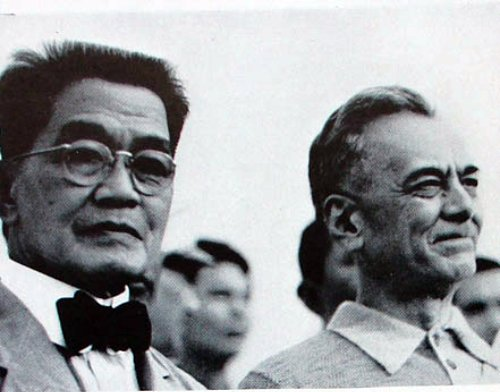
Quezon (right) with presidential rival Emilio Aguinaldo in 1935.

Candidate	Party	Votes	%
Manuel L. Quezon	Nacionalista Party	695,332	67.98
Emilio Aguinaldo	National Socialist Party	179,349	17.53
Gregorio Aglipay	Republican Party	148,010	14.47
Pascual Racuyal	Independent	158	0.02
Total		1,022,849	100.00

Candidate	Party	Votes	%
Manuel L. Quezon	Nacionalista Party	1,340,320	80.14
Juan Sumulong	Popular Front (Sumulong wing) (Note: The Popular Front was split into two wings: those who supported Pedro Abad Santos or the "Abad Santos wing" and those who supported Juan Sumulong or the "Sumulong wing".)	298,608	17.85
Celerino Tiongco I	Ganap Party	22,474	1.34
Hilario Moncado	Modernist Party	10,726	0.64
Hermogenes Dumpit	Independent	298	0.02
Veronica Miciano	Independent	62	0.00
Ernesto T. Belleza	Independent	16	0.00
Pedro Abad Santos (Note: Withdrew)	Popular Front (Abad Santos wing)	0	0.00
Total		1,672,504	100.00

== Personal life ==
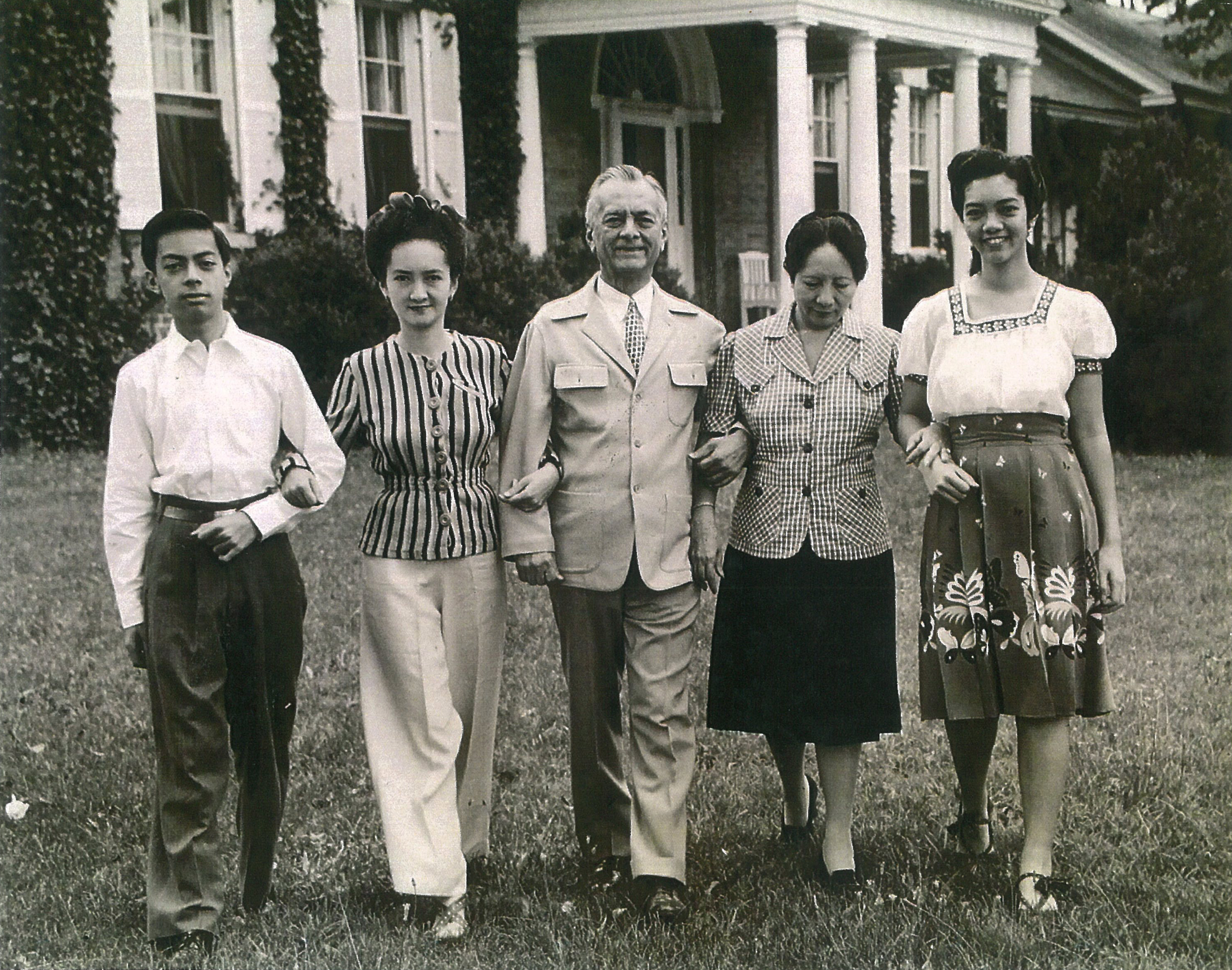
Quezon with his wife, Aurora, and their children in 1942

Quezon was married to his first cousin, Aurora Aragón Quezon. They wed through a civil ceremony on 14 December 1918, followed by a religious ceremony three days later, both in Hong Kong. The couple had four children: María Aurora "Baby" Quezon (23 September 1919 – 28 April 1949), María Zeneida "Nini" Quezon-Avanceña (9 April 1921 – 12 July 2021), Luisa Corazón Paz "Nenita" Quezon (17 February – 14 December 1924) and Manuel L. "Nonong" Quezon Jr. (23 June 1926 – 18 September 1998).

His grandson, Manuel L. "Manolo" Quezon III (born 30 May 1970), a writer and former undersecretary of the Presidential Communications Development and Strategic Planning Office, was named after him.

== Awards and honors ==
The Foreign Orders, Medals and Decorations of President Manuel L. Quezon:

- Foreign Awards
  - France:: Légion d'honneur, Officer
  - Mexico:: Order of the Aztec Eagle, Collar
  - Belgium:: Order of the Crown, Grand Cross
  - Spain:: Orden de la República Española, Grand Cross
  - Republic of China:: Order of Brilliant Jade, Grand Cordon
- National Honors
  - : Order of the Golden Heart, Grand Collar (Maringal na Kuwintas) – 19 August 1960
  - : Order of the Knights of Rizal, Knight Grand Cross of Rizal (KGCR)
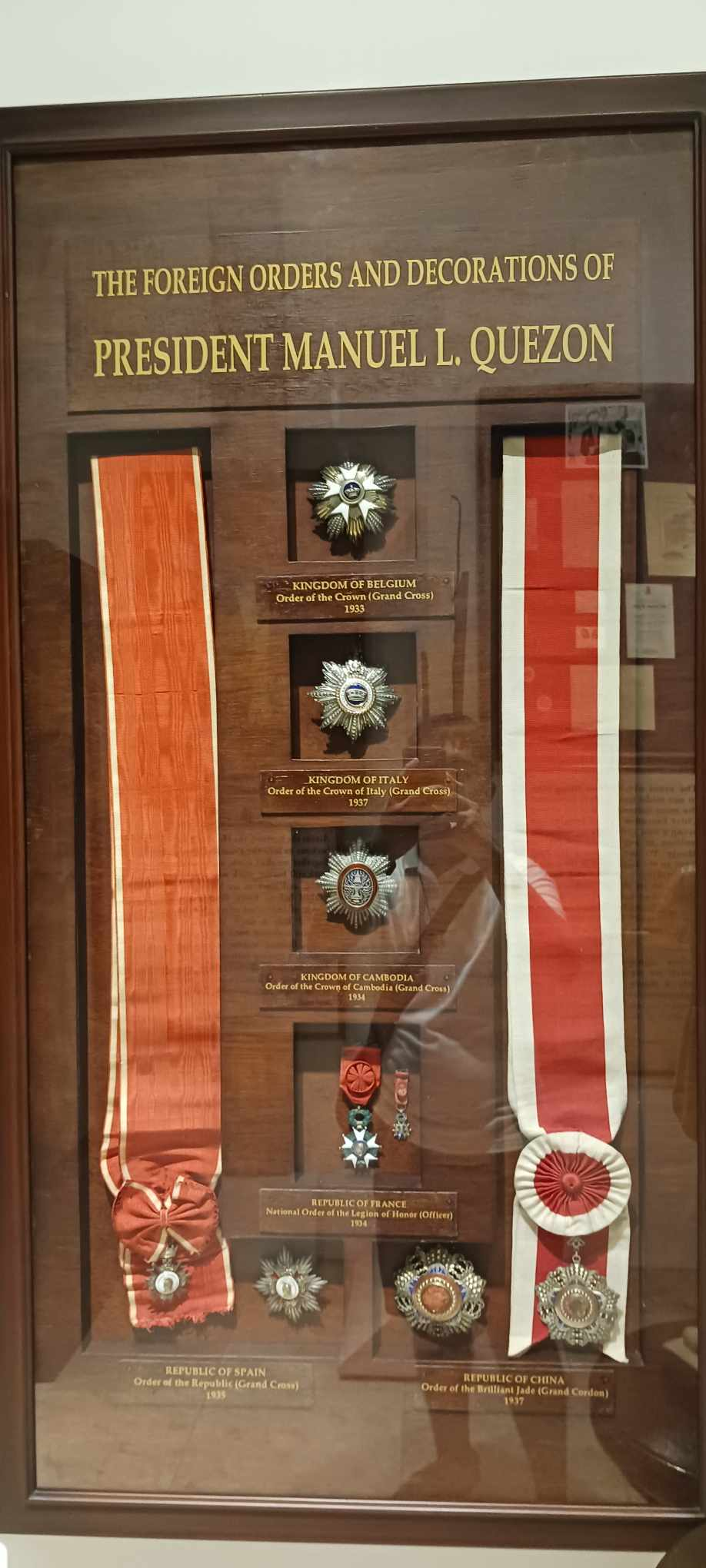
    Foreign Orders and Decorations of Quezon displayed in the Presidential Museum and Library
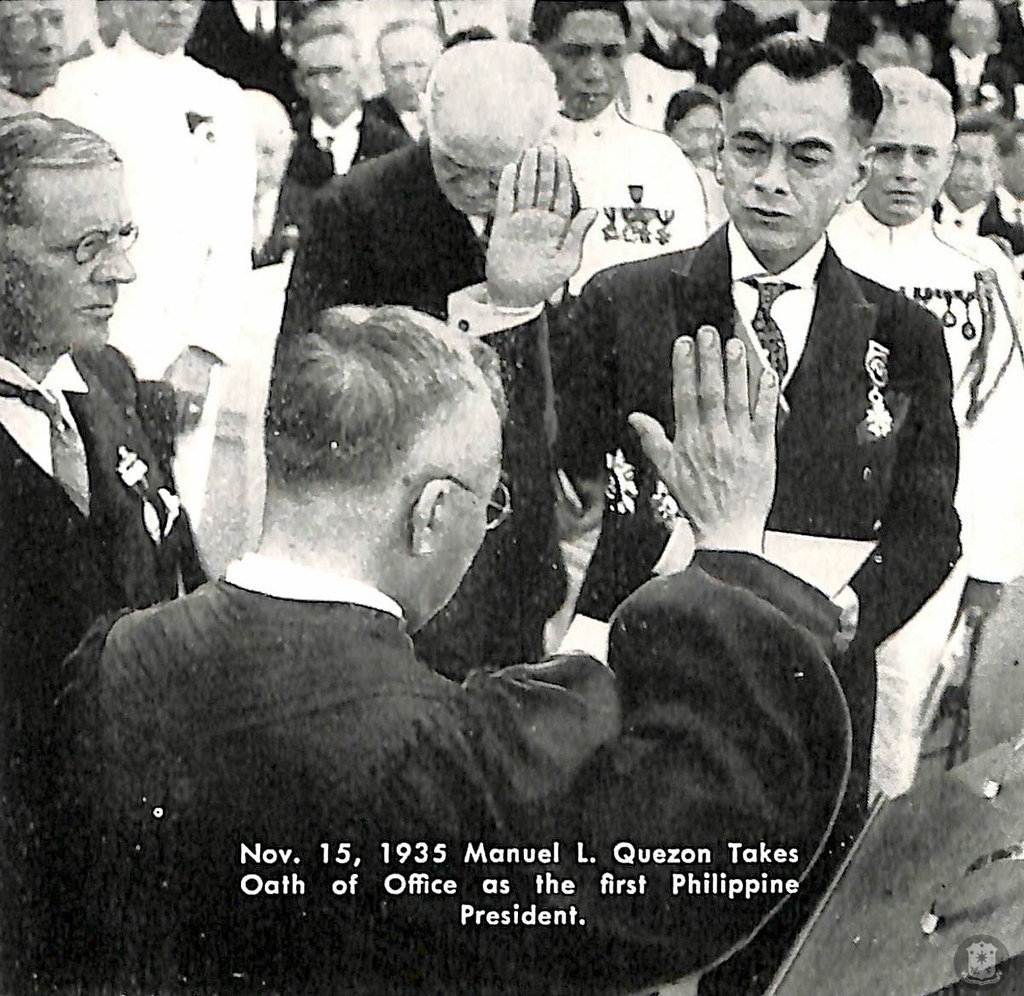
    Quezon taking the Oath of Office at his Inauguration at the Legislative Building on November 15, 1935
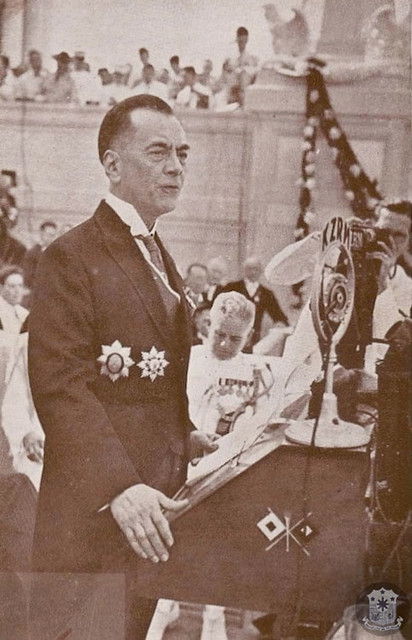
    Quezon delivering his Inaugural Address at the Legislative Building on November 15, 1935, in Manila

== Legacy ==
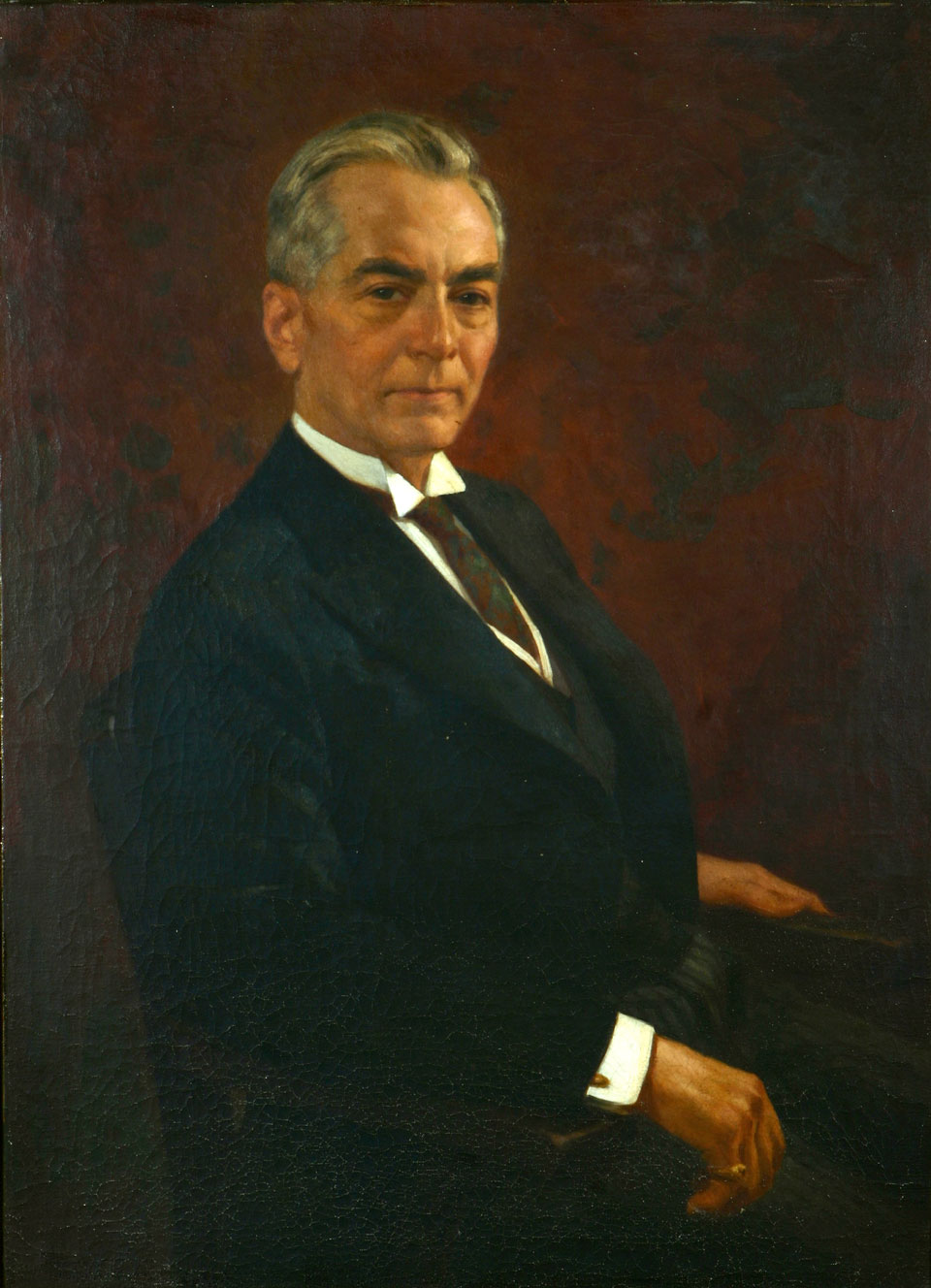
Official Malacañang Palace portrait of Quezon, by Fernando Amorsolo

Quezon City, the province of Quezon, Quezon Bridge in Manila, Manuel L. Quezon University, and many streets are named after him. The Quezon Service Cross is the Philippines' highest honor. Quezon is memorialized on Philippine currency, appearing on the Philippine twenty-peso note and two commemorative 1936 one-peso coins: one with Frank Murphy and another with Franklin Delano Roosevelt. Open Doors, a Holocaust memorial in Rishon LeZion, Israel, is a 7-metre-tall (23 ft) sculpture designed by Filipino artist Luis Lee Jr. It was erected in honor of Quezon and the Filipinos who saved over 1,200 Jews from Nazi Germany.

Municipalities in six provinces are named after Quezon: Quezon, Bukidnon; Quezon, Isabela; Quezon, Nueva Ecija; Quezon, Nueva Vizcaya; Quezon, Palawan; and Quezon, Quezon. The Presidential Papers of Manuel L. Quezon were inscribed in the UNESCO Memory of the World International Register in 2011. Quezon Island is the most developed island in the Hundred Islands National Park.

Annually on 19 August, Manuel L. Quezon Day is celebrated throughout the Philippines as a special working holiday, except for the provinces of Quezon (including Lucena) and Aurora and Quezon City, where it is a non-working holiday. His birthplace Baler is now part of Aurora, which was a sub-province of Quezon and was named after his cousin and wife.

The Presidential Papers of Manuel Luis Quezon was inscribed in the UNESCO Memory of the World Register – Asia and the Pacific in 2010, and in the UNESCO Memory of the World International Register in 2011.

In 2015, the Board of the International Raoul Wallenberg Foundation bestowed a posthumous Wallenberg Medal on Quezon and the people of the Philippines for reaching out to victims of the Holocaust from 1937 to 1941. President Benigno Aquino III and then-94-year-old Maria Zeneida Quezon-Avanceña, the daughter of the former president, were informed of this recognition.

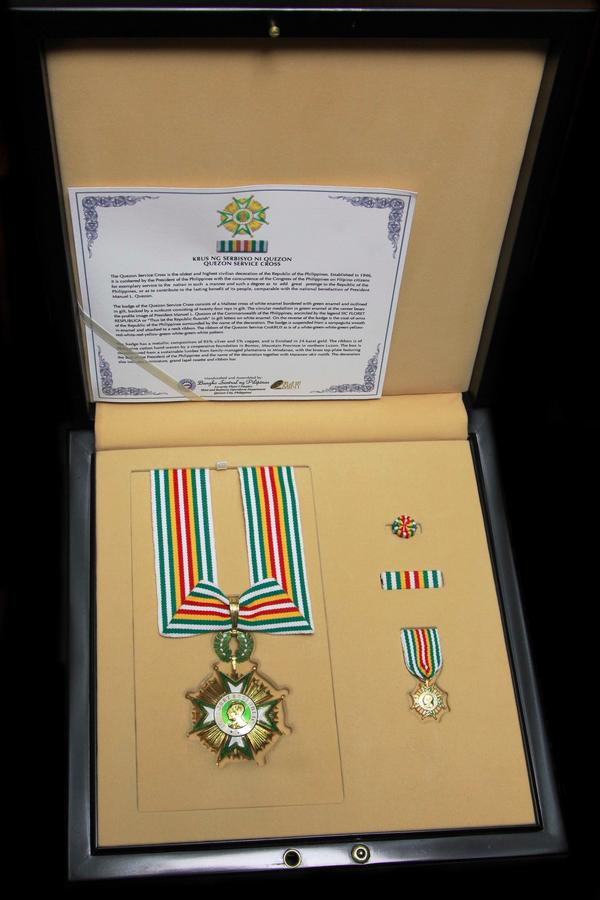
The Quezon Service Cross, the Philippines' highest civilian honor

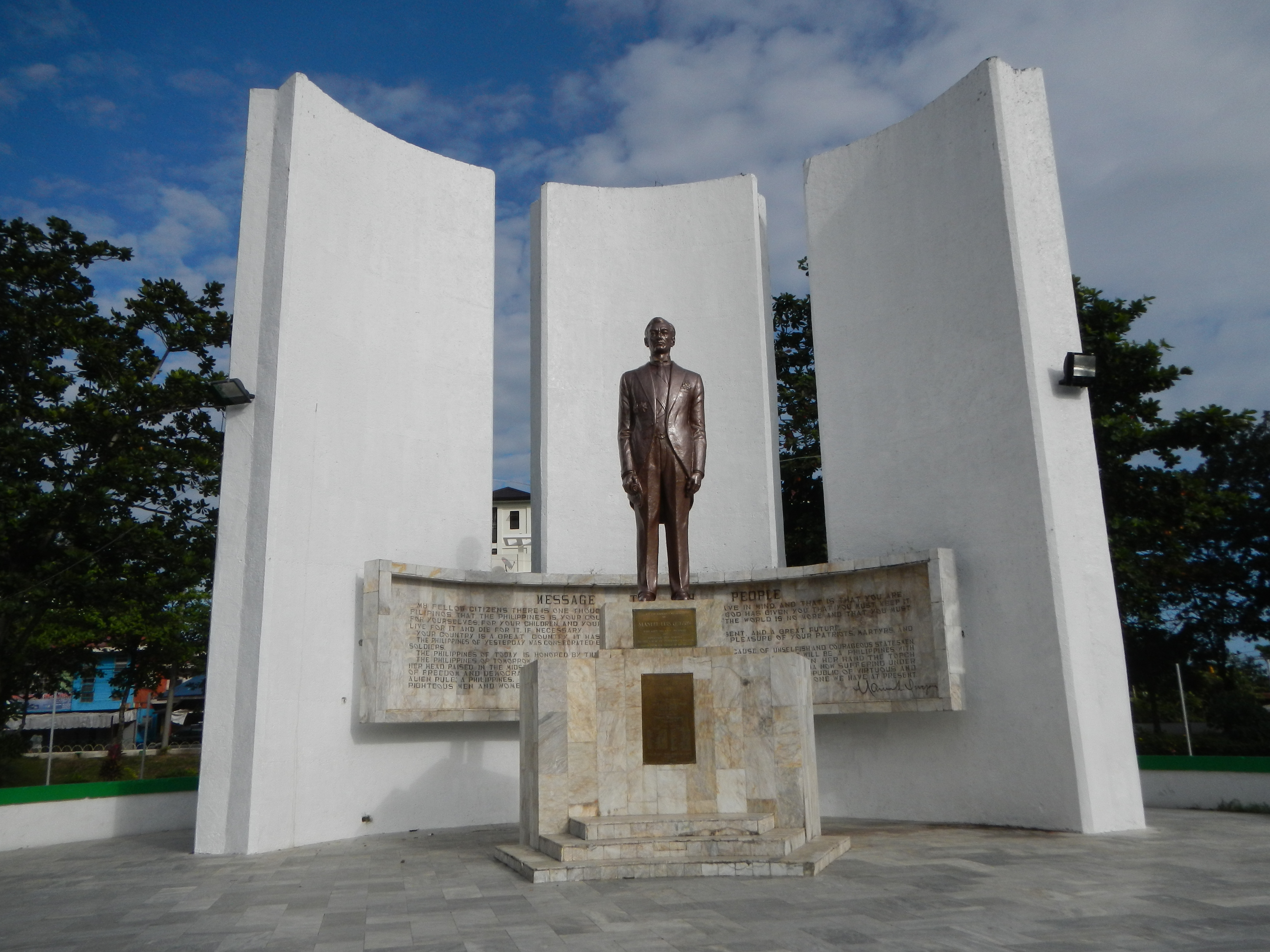
Monument in Lucena

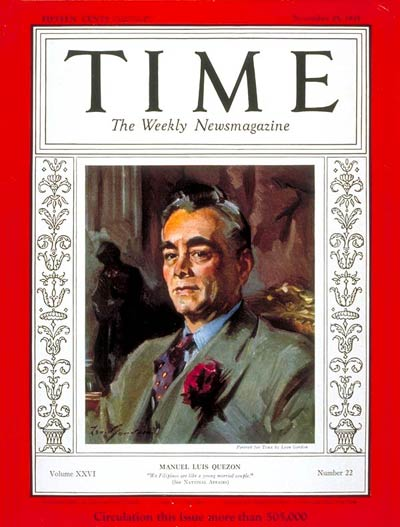
Time cover, 1935

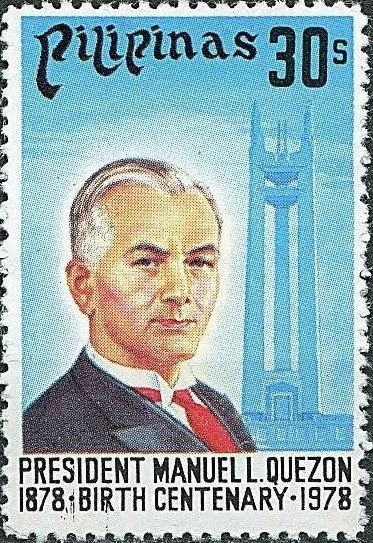
1978 birth-centenary stamp

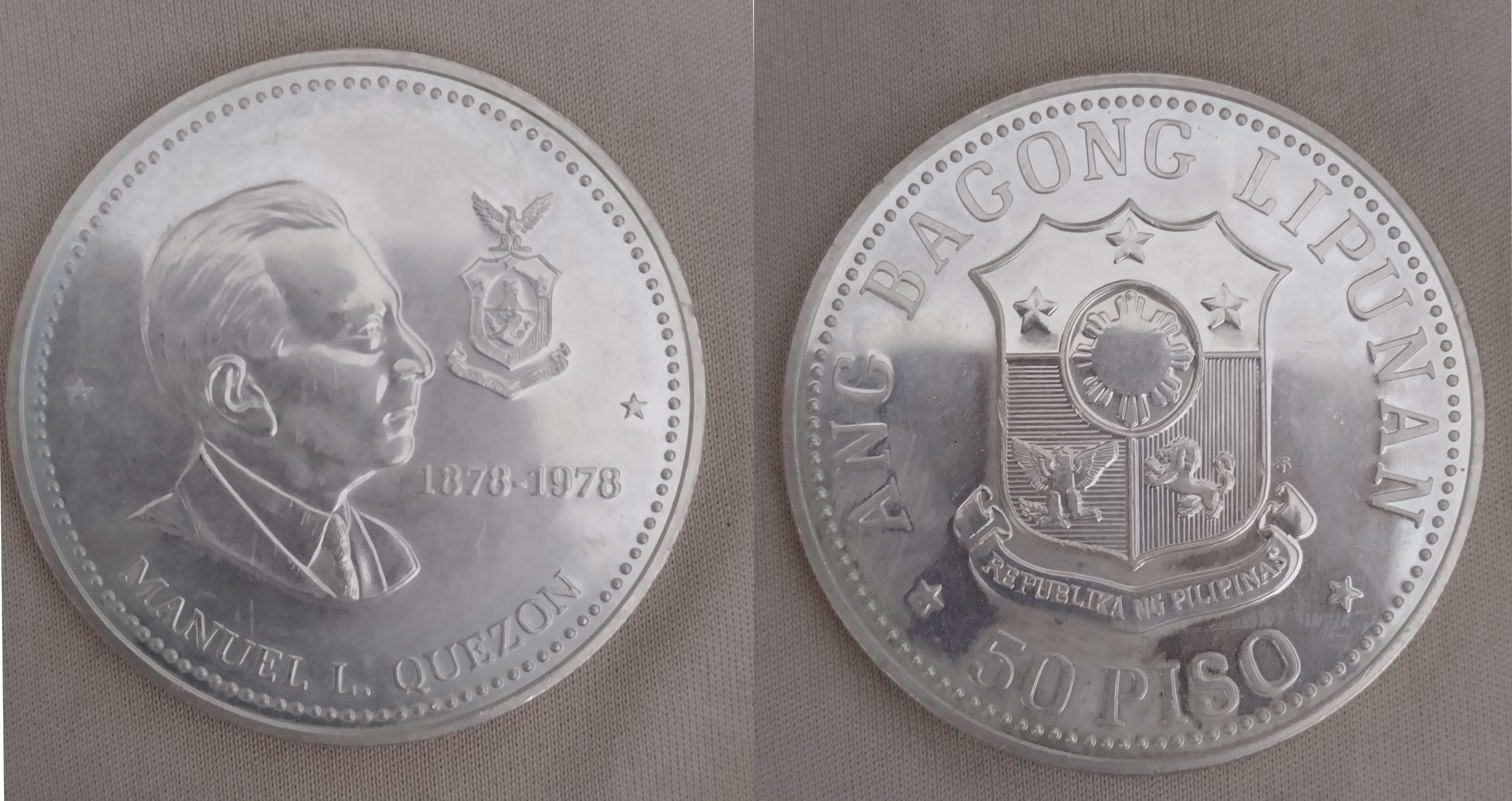
Commemorative ₱50 coin released in 1978

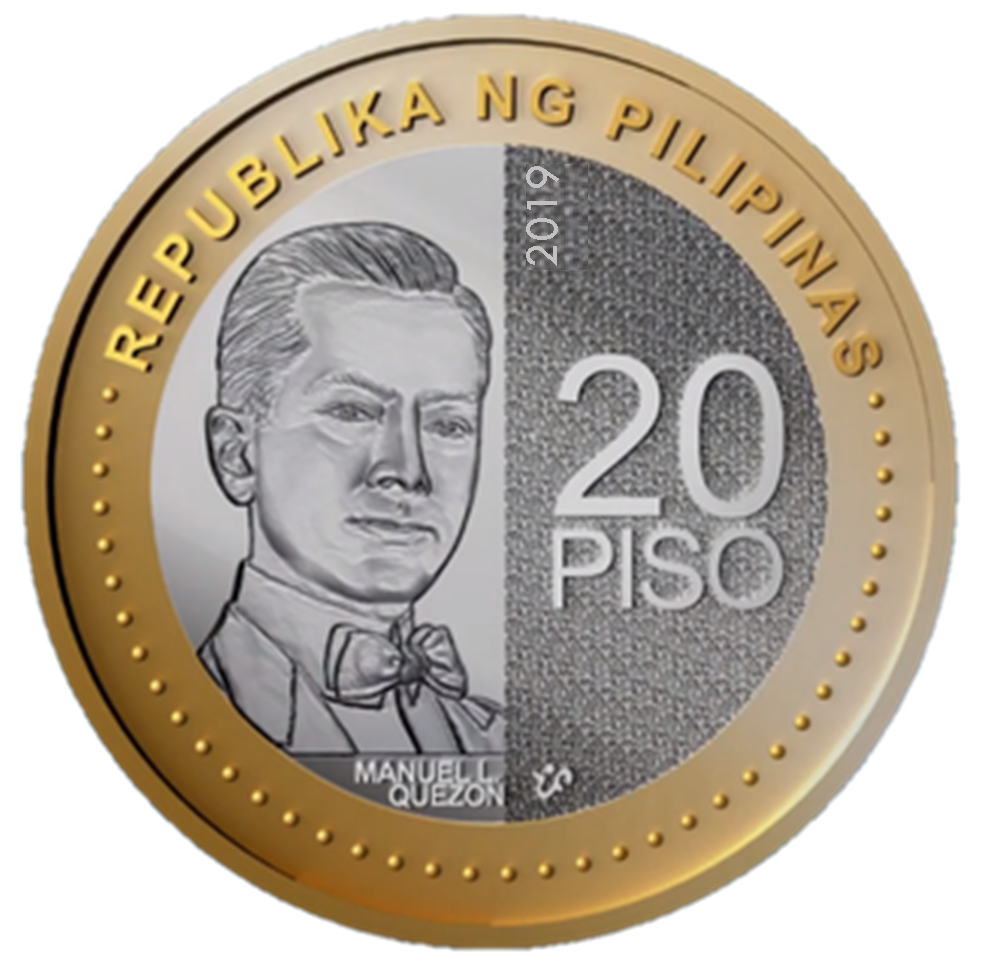
₱20 coin introduced in 2019

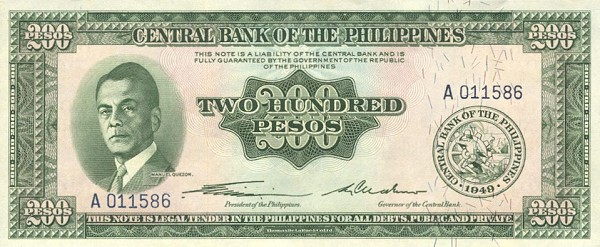
₱200 English series banknote

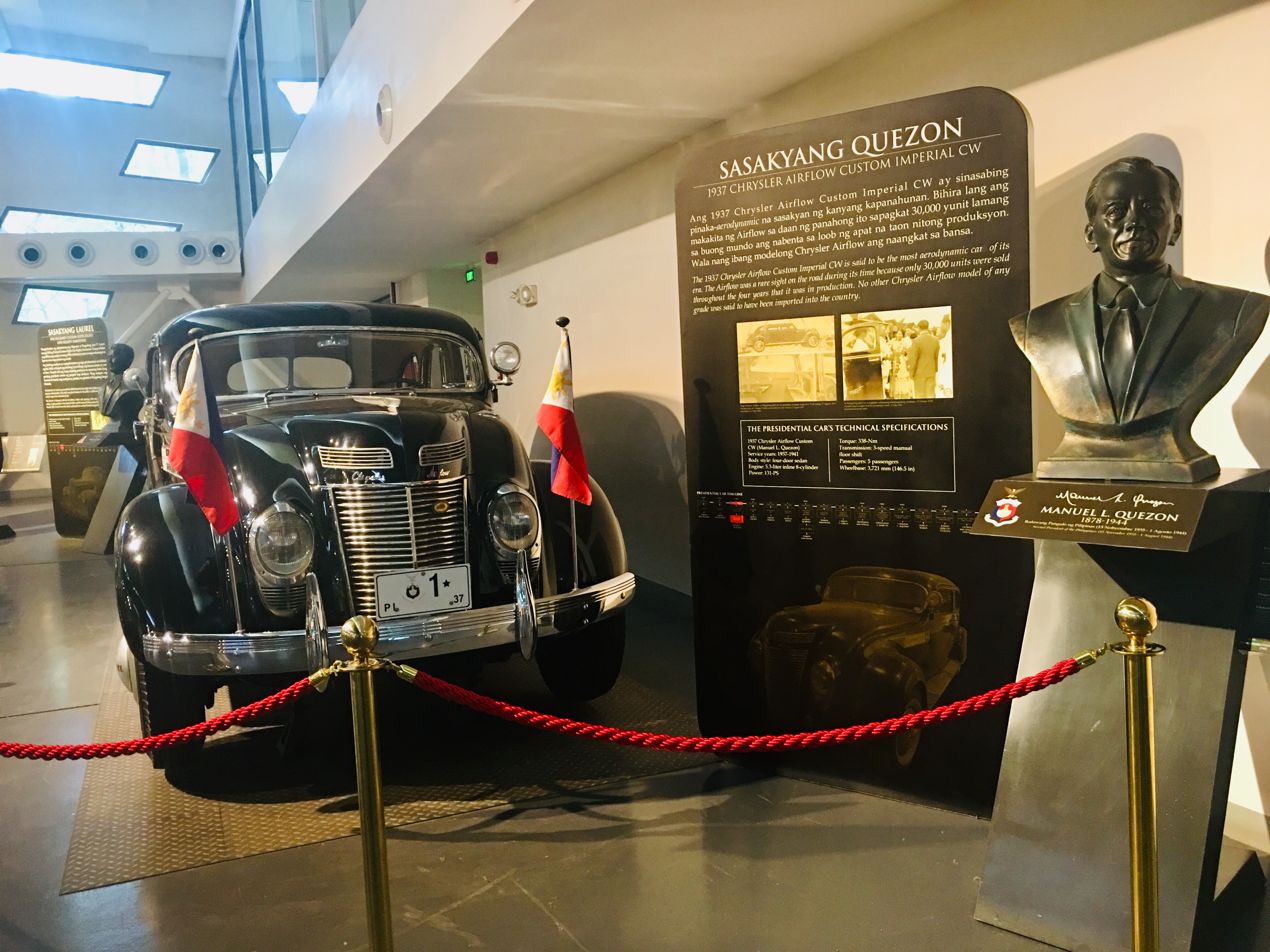
The 1935 Cadillac V-16 car of President Quezon displayed at the Presidential Car Museum

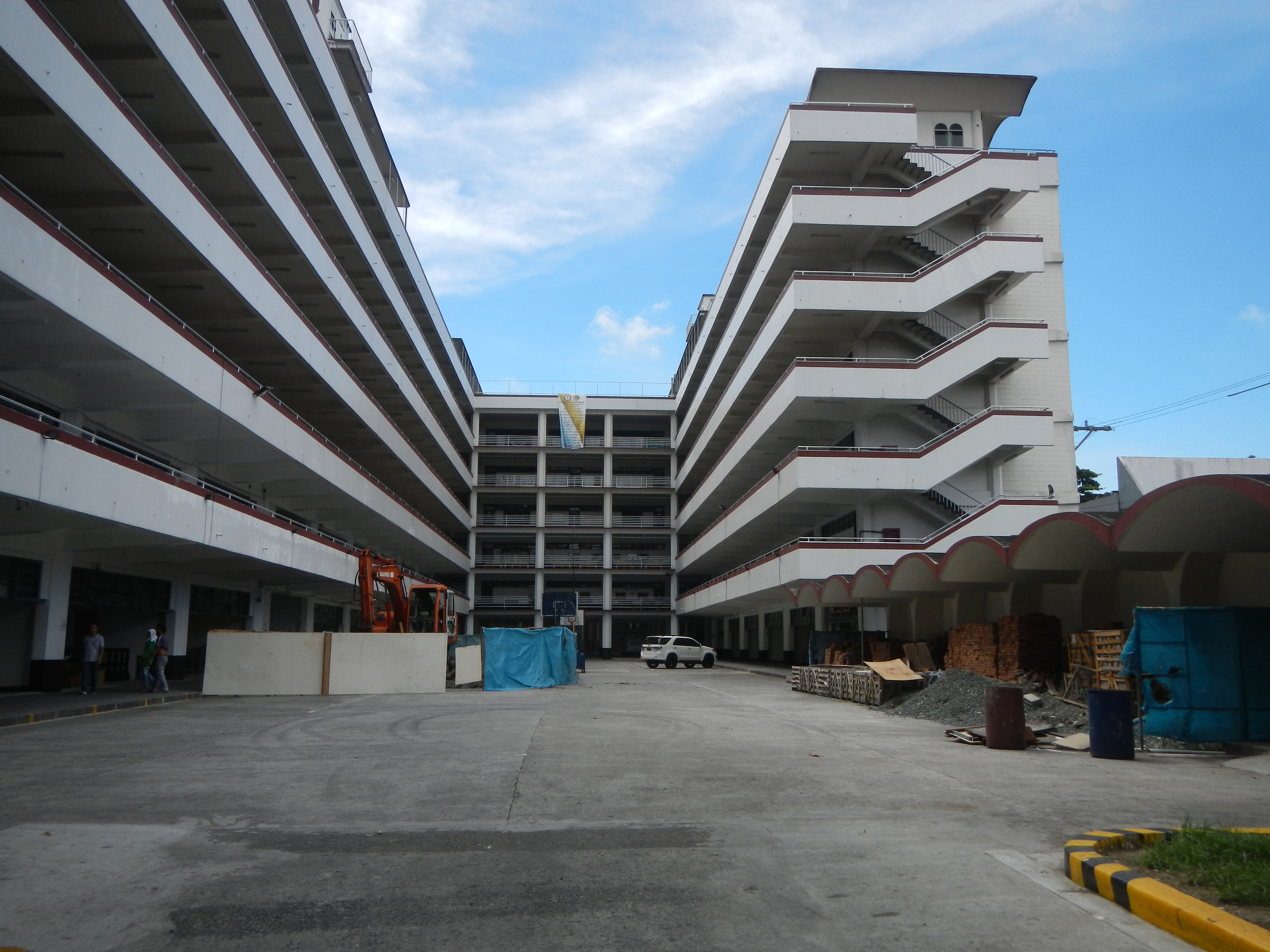
Manuel L. Quezon University campus in Manila

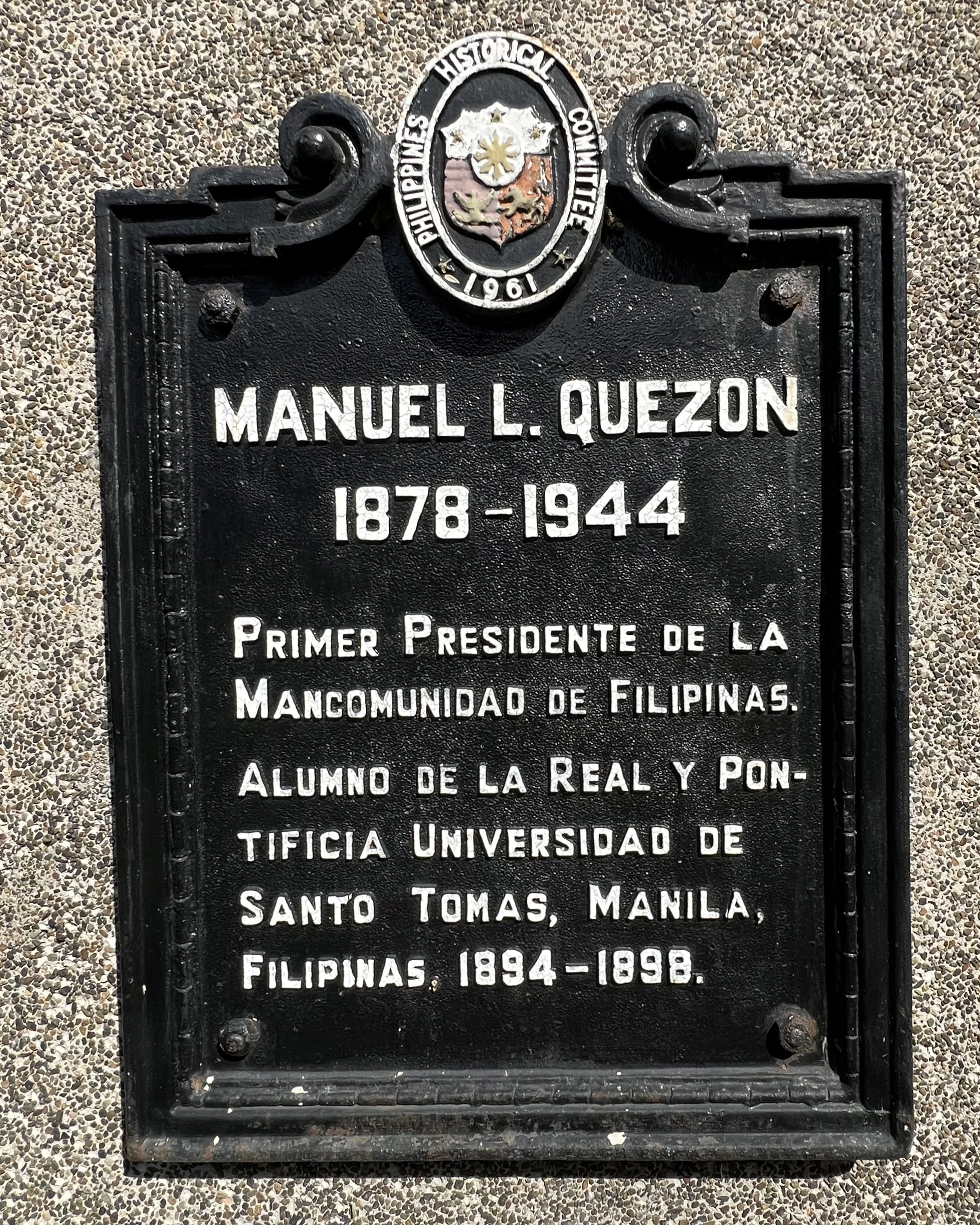
National Historical Commission of the Philippines marker embedded on the University of Santo Tomas Arch of the Centuries

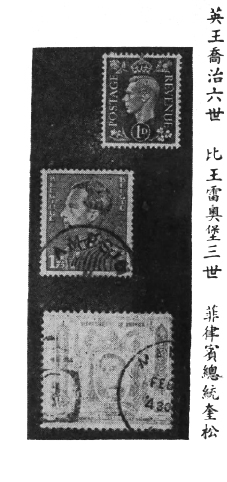
A stamp featuring Quezon (bottom) in a 1941 collection of contemporary portraits

Quezon Memorial Shrine

== In popular culture ==
Quezon was played by Richard Gutierrez in the 2010 music video of the Philippine national anthem produced and aired by GMA Network. Arnold Reyes played him in the musical MLQ: Ang Buhay ni Manuel Luis Quezon (2015). Quezon was played by Benjamin Alves in the film, Heneral Luna (2015). Alves and TJ Trinidad portrayed him in the 2018 film Goyo: Ang Batang Heneral (2018). Quezon was played by Raymond Bagatsing in the film Quezon's Game (2019).

Jericho Rosales and Alves portrayed Quezon in his later and younger years, respectively, in the biopic, Quezon. With the National Commission for Culture and the Arts's support and the Film Development Council of the Philippines' funding, the biopic began filmmaking in March 2025 and was released in October 2025.

== Speech recording ==
A sample of Quezon's voice is preserved in a recorded speech, "Message to My People", which he delivered in English and Spanish. Quezon recorded it while he was President of the Senate "in the 1920s, when he was first diagnosed with tuberculosis and assumed he didn't have much longer to live," according to his grandson Manuel L. Quezon III.

== See also ==
- List of Asian Americans and Pacific Islands Americans in the United States Congress
- List of Hispanic and Latino Americans in the United States Congress
- List of Memory of the World Documentary Heritage in the Philippines

U.S. House of Representatives
Preceded by Pablo Ocampo	Resident Commissioner of the Philippines; 1909–1916; Served alongside: Benito Legarda, Manuel Earnshaw	Succeeded by Teodoro R. Yangco
Senate of the Philippines
New seat	Senator from the 5th district 1916–1935	Seat abolished
New office	President of the Senate; 1916–1935	Vacant Senate and House of Representatives merged into the unicameral National Assembly. Title next held by Manuel Roxas
Political offices
Preceded by Ricardo Paras	Governor of Tayabas; 1906–1907	Succeeded by Alfredo Castro
Recreated Title last held by Emilio Aguinaldo as President of the First Philippine Republic	President of the Philippines; 1935–1944	Succeeded by José P. Laurel as President of the Second Philippine Republic
Preceded by Frank Murphy as Governor General of the Philippines	President of the Philippines; 1935–1944	Succeeded by Sergio Osmeña as President of the Philippine Commonwealth
New office	Mayor of Quezon City; Acting; 1939	Succeeded by Tomas Morato
Preceded by Teófilo Sison	Secretary of National Defense; 1941	Succeeded by Jorge B. Vargas
Olympic Games
Preceded by William Cameron Forbes	President of the Philippine Amateur Athletic Federation; 1916–1935	Succeeded by Jorge B. Vargas
Party political offices
First	Nacionalista nominee for President of the Philippines; 1935, 1941	Succeeded by Sergio Osmeña
Preceded by Sergio Osmeña	President of the Nacionalista Party; 1935–1944	Succeeded by Sergio Osmeña
