= Tirad Pass: The Last Stand of Gen. Gregorio del Pilar =

- Theatrical release poster
- Directed by: Carlo J. Caparas
- Produced by: Donna Villa
- Starring: Romnick Sarmenta
- Production company: Uni-Films Production Inc.
- Distributed by: Golden Lion Films
- Release date: July 4, 1996
- Country: Philippines
- Language: Filipino
- Budget: ₱50 million

Tirad Pass: The Last Stand of Gen. Gregorio del Pilar is a 1996 Philippine biographical epic film directed by Carlo J. Caparas and starring Romnick Sarmenta as the titular Gregorio del Pilar, one of the youngest Filipino generals during the Philippine–American War, who died in the Battle of Tirad Pass.

== Plot ==
Gregorio del Pilar, a university student in Manila, joins the Katipunan secret society which plans an armed revolution against Spanish colonial rule. He is initiated by his uncle Deodato Arellano with a blood compact and he adopts the codename Aguila (Eagle).

When the Philippine Revolution breaks out in 1896, del Pilar joins the rebellion in his native province of Bulacan. His first taste of combat is when he and seven friends, which he dubs his Siete Mosqueteros (Seven Musketeers), waylay a Spanish patrol in the streets for their rifles, armed only with blades.

They then join the forces of Maestro Sebio (Eusebio Roque), a folk-Catholic mystic reputed to be magically invulnerable to Spanish bullets. In the Battle of Kakarong de Sili, the rebels are wiped out when their stronghold is overwhelmed, and Maestro Sebio is captured and later executed by firing squad (by Filipinos, after a volley from Spanish soldiers has no effect). Del Pilar is injured in the battle and some of his friends are killed, but he escapes.

Del Pilar then joins Emilio Aguinaldo, the President of the nascent Philippine Republic, in his hideout in Biak-na-Bato, San Miguel, Bulacan. He gains Aguinaldo's trust and admiration after he leads a successful attack on Paombong, Bulacan where his men infiltrate through the town church disguised in women's clothes. Soon, del Pilar is in Aguinaido's inner circle as his favorite officer.

The rebels and the Spanish authorities work out a truce with the Pact of Biak-na-Bato in 1897, and Del Pilar follows Aguinaldo in exile to Hong Kong. However, Aguinaldo is convinced by American officials to resume the revolution as an ally of the United States, which has declared war on Spain. Del Pilar follows Aguinaldo back to the Philippines as the Americans launch their invasion in 1898.

By the end of 1898, most of the country has fallen to American and Filipino forces and Aguinaldo has declared Philippine independence in his home province of Cavite. But this is ignored by both the Spanish and American authorities, and Spain formally surrenders the Philippines to the United States alone through the Treaty of Paris.

Tensions between the Americans and Filipinos erupt with the Philippine–American War (called the Philippine Insurrection by the Americans) in early 1899. The outgunned Filipino forces are repeatedly defeated, and Aguinaldo is forced to go on the run to the north.

In December 1899, Del Pilar and his men fight the Battle of Tirad Pass in Ilocos province to cover Aguinaldo's retreat, aware it is probably a suicide mission. Their last stand holds up the pursuing Americans for some time until a Filipino guide leads the Americans to higher ground, surrounding del Pilar's forces. His men are all wiped out, and he charges the Americans alone on his horse, but a shot in the neck fells him from behind. The Americans strip his corpse for souvenirs and leave it unburied. Aguinaldo later sees Del Pilar's riderless horse and sheds a tear.

== Cast ==
- Romnick Sarmenta as Gregorio del Pilar
- Joel Torre as Emilio Aguinaldo
- Obet Pagdanganan as Deodato Arellano
- Tommy Abuel as Eusebio "Maestro Sebio" Roque
- Jude Estrada

== Production ==
Tirad Pass was based on the writings of Filipino historian Teodoro Kalaw. It had a budget of 50 million pesos. Director Carlo J. Caparas stated that the production lasted seven months, becoming "the biggest movie he and his wife Donna Villa have made so far."

== Release ==
It was released on July 4, 1996, as part of the then-ongoing centennial commemorations for the Philippine Revolution.

== Reception ==
Journalist and writer Jessica Zafra opined that the film had unrealistic and cheesy battle scenes, with "amazing rifles which require no reloading whatsoever" and "loud explosions which cause no perceptible damage", and that del Pilar and Aguinaldo's relationship had possibly unintentional homoerotic overtones, with "protracted sequences in which Torre and Sarmenta exchange lingering looks and passionately declare their loyalty to the flag".

== See also ==
- Sakay (1993)
- José Rizal (1998)
- El Presidente (2012)
- Heneral Luna (2015)
- Goyo: The Boy General (2018)
