= Gregorio del Pilar, Ilocos Sur =

Municipality in Ilocos Sur, Philippines

Gregorio del Pilar Concepcion
- Municipality
- Municipality of Gregorio del Pilar
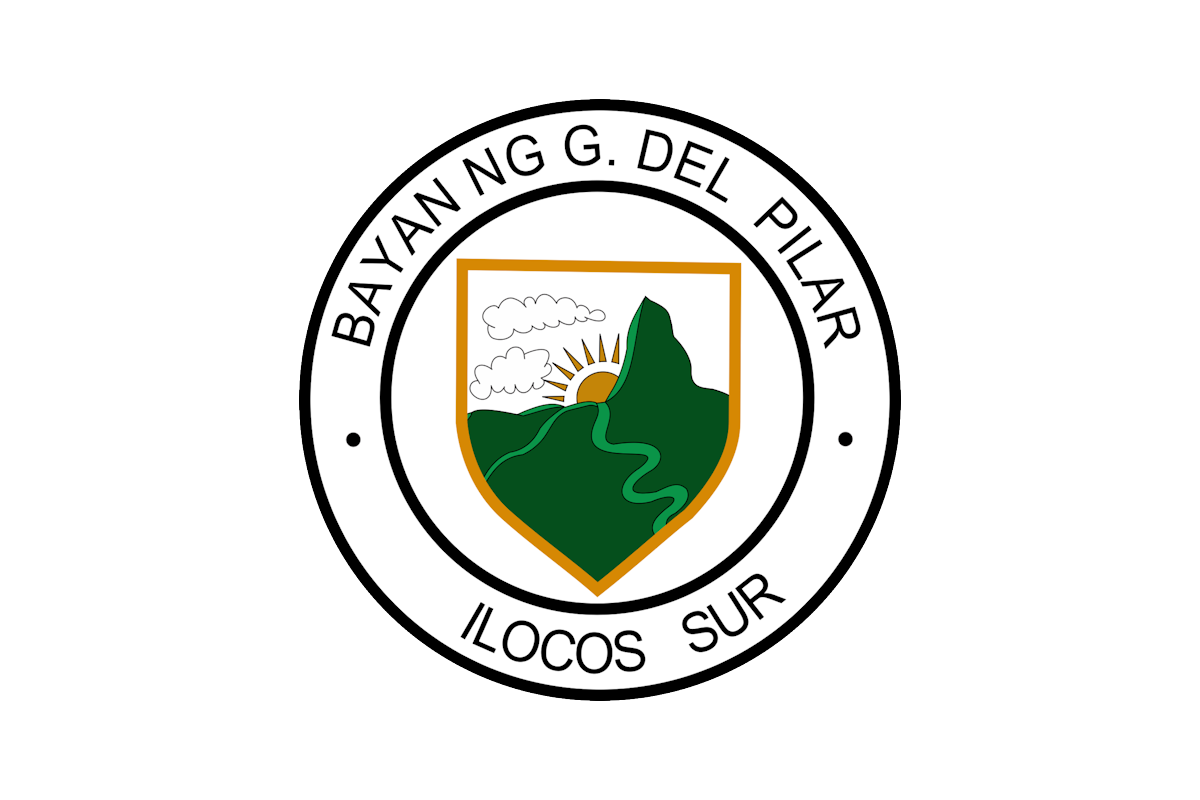
- Flag Seal

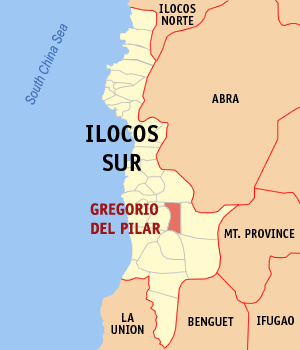
- Map of Ilocos Sur with Gregorio del Pilar highlighted
- Interactive map of Gregorio del Pilar
- Location within the Philippines
- Coordinates: 17°08′54″N 120°36′40″E
- Country: Philippines
- Region: Ilocos Region
- Province: Ilocos Sur
- District: 2nd district
- Named for: Gregorio del Pilar
- Barangays: 7 (see Barangays)

Government
  - Type: Sangguniang Bayan
  - Mayor: Henry S. Gallardo
  - Vice Mayor: Rolando P. Onie
  - Representative: Kristine Singson-Meehan
  - Municipal Council: Members: Rogelio B. Bicasan Jr.; Ulysses R. Duquing; Rico W. Dangtayan; Romy C. Bitongan; Daniel M. Ciriaco; Levi A. Bugtong; Alfonso S. Baliling; Jacob B. Ciriaco
  - Electorate: 3,375 voters (2025)

Area
  - Total: 41.66 km^{2} (16.09 sq mi)
- Elevation: 569 m (1,867 ft)
- Highest elevation: 1,438 m (4,718 ft)
- Lowest elevation: 95 m (312 ft)

Population (2024 census)
  - Total: 4,385
  - Density: 105.3/km^{2} (272.6/sq mi)
  - Households: 956

Economy
  - Income class: 1st municipal income class
  - Poverty incidence: 8.99% (2023)
  - Revenue: ₱ 336.5 million (2024)
  - Assets: ₱ 1,407 million (2024)
  - Expenditure: ₱ 159.2 million (2024)
  - Liabilities: ₱ 51.64 million (2024)

Service provider
  - Electricity: Ilocos Sur Electric Cooperative (ISECO)
- Time zone: UTC+8 (PST)
- ZIP code: 2720
- PSGC: 0102910000
- IDD : area code: +63 (0)77
- Native languages: Ilocano; Tagalog

Gregorio del Pilar, officially the Municipality of Gregorio del Pilar (Ilocano: Ili ti Gregorio del Pilar; Tagalog: Bayan ng Gregorio del Pilar) is a municipality in the province of Ilocos Sur, Philippines. According to the 2024 census, it has a population of 4,385 people.

== Etymology ==
In the past, the name of the town used to be 'Ananaaw' before it was changed into Concepcion (in honor of its patron saint, Nuestra Senora de Concepcion). It was eventually renamed in memory of General Gregorio del Pilar on June 10, 1955 by virtue of Republic Act No. 1246, which was sponsored by Congressman Ricardo Gacula. The municipality is the site of the Battle of Tirad Pass, where General del Pilar and his men fought a last stand against the Americans.

== History ==
=== Battle of Tirad Pass ===
Gregorio del Pilar statue and Memorare historical marker at Tirad Pass

On December 2, 1899, the United States 33rd Volunteer Infantry Regiment under Major Peyton C. March, prepared for an assault of the Filipino forces fortification under the command of General Gregorio del Pilar. On the narrow trail of Tirad Pass, the Filipino soldiers watched as the enemy began to move up the trail. On around a few hundreds yards above the pass, General Gregorio del Pilar, with his staff and accompanied by two civilians from Sitio Mabatano, spotted the American forces through his spy glass as they were starting to move. But as he watched, he noticed that the American forces broke formation and instead sent a messenger on horse back with a white banner. As the messenger was coming near the fortification of Filipino forces, the sound of a gun was heard and the messenger fell. The American forces divided into three separate groups. One group followed the trail towards the pass.

Another group ascended the hill facing the Filipino soldiers stationed in the pass. The third group, led by a Filipino from the lowlands named Januario Galut, made their way up unnoticed through the old trail which was hastily barricaded by felled trees a few days before the Americans arrived. This old path led to the place where General del Pilar stood watching. As the American forces dispersed, the general ordered the two civilians, Tucdaden and Abeng to proceed to the trenches and deliver the breakfast of the Filipino soldiers. All of a sudden, continuous gunshots were heard continuously and went unabated for several hours. General del Pilar was shot and killed.

== Geography ==
The town lies among the western hills of the Cordilleras in the interior eastern portion of the province of Ilocos Sur. It is bounded to the north by the town of San Emilio, Quirino to the east, Sigay to the south, and Salcedo to the west. Its 7 barangays and sitios are connected by winding foot trails and seasonal rugged roads. The town is likewise endowed with natural scenery and wonders such as the payoh or rice terraces, pristine waterfalls, and the distinctive peak of Mount Tirad. There are also trails crisscrossing Tirad Pass, which were built through polo y servicio (forced labor) during the Spanish Period.

Gregorio del Pilar is situated 86.60 kilometres (53.81 mi) from the provincial capital Vigan, and 362.21 kilometres (225.07 mi) from the country's capital city of Manila.

=== Barangays ===
Gregorio del Pilar is politically subdivided into 7 barangays. Each barangay consists of puroks and some have sitios.

- Alfonso (Tangaoan)
- Bussot
- Concepcion
- Dapdappig (Mabatano)
- Matue-Butarag
- Poblacion Norte
- Poblacion Sur

==== Sitios ====
Gregorio del Pilar is politically subdivided into 5 sitios.

- Mabatano
- Tangaoan
- Ul-oling
- Tubalina
- Butarag

=== Climate ===
Climate data for Gregorio del Pilar, Ilocos Sur
| Month | Jan | Feb | Mar | Apr | May | Jun | Jul | Aug | Sep | Oct | Nov | Dec | Year |
|---|---|---|---|---|---|---|---|---|---|---|---|---|---|
| Mean daily maximum °C (°F) | 28 (82) | 29 (84) | 30 (86) | 31 (88) | 30 (86) | 29 (84) | 28 (82) | 28 (82) | 28 (82) | 29 (84) | 29 (84) | 28 (82) | 29 (84) |
| Mean daily minimum °C (°F) | 18 (64) | 19 (66) | 21 (70) | 23 (73) | 24 (75) | 23 (73) | 23 (73) | 23 (73) | 23 (73) | 21 (70) | 20 (68) | 19 (66) | 21 (70) |
| Average precipitation mm (inches) | 27 (1.1) | 31 (1.2) | 40 (1.6) | 71 (2.8) | 207 (8.1) | 237 (9.3) | 286 (11.3) | 261 (10.3) | 261 (10.3) | 254 (10.0) | 88 (3.5) | 46 (1.8) | 1,809 (71.3) |
| Average rainy days | 9.4 | 9.3 | 12.7 | 17.0 | 25.4 | 26.8 | 27.4 | 26.1 | 25.0 | 21.0 | 15.5 | 10.6 | 226.2 |
Source: Meteoblue (modeled/calculated data, not measured locally)

== Demographics ==
Population census of Gregorio del Pilar

| Year | Pop. | ±% p.a. |
|---|---|---|
| 1903 | 99 | — |
| 1918 | 1,436 | +19.52% |
| 1939 | 2,046 | +1.70% |
| 1948 | 1,819 | −1.30% |
| 1960 | 2,164 | +1.46% |
| 1970 | 2,657 | +2.07% |

| Year | Pop. | ±% p.a. |
|---|---|---|
| 1975 | 2,950 | +2.12% |
| 1980 | 3,080 | +0.87% |
| 1990 | 3,417 | +1.04% |
| 1995 | 3,940 | +2.70% |
| 2000 | 4,134 | +1.04% |
| 2007 | 4,308 | +0.57% |

| Year | Pop. | ±% p.a. |
|---|---|---|
| 2010 | 4,219 | −0.76% |
| 2015 | 4,875 | +2.79% |
| 2020 | 4,472 | −1.80% |
| 2024 | 4,385 | −0.47% |

Source: Philippine Statistics Authority

In the 2024 census, Gregorio del Pilar had a population of 4,385 people. The population density was 110 inhabitants per square kilometre (280/sq mi).

The inhabitants are Igorots, but belong to the Bag-o ethno-linguistic group. This mixture of Ilocano and Igorot intermarriages speak the Kankanaey language but can speak and understand the dialects of their neighboring towns. Many have already acquired college education and some serve the government and private institutions.

== Economy ==
Poverty incidence of Gregorio del Pilar (%)

Source: Philippine Statistics Authority

The municipality's main economic source is agriculture. Farmers grow rice, corn, and crops.

== Government ==
=== Local government ===
Gregorio del Pilar, belonging to the second congressional district of the province of Ilocos Sur, is governed by a mayor designated as its local chief executive and by a municipal council as its legislative body in accordance with the Local Government Code. The mayor, vice mayor, and the councilors are elected directly by the people through an election which is being held every three years.

=== Elected officials ===
Members of the Municipal Council (2025–2028)
| Position | Name |
|---|---|
| Congressman | Kristine Singson-Meehan |
| Mayor | Rogelio B. Bicasan Jr. |
| Vice-Mayor | Henry S. Gallardo |
| Councilors | Socrates C. Rous |
| Councilors | Hunts D. Ciriaco |
| Councilors | Rogelio D. Balao |
| Councilors | Donnie Mar B. Ciriaco |
| Councilors | Wallie Jonjon N. Budao |
| Councilors | Andrew S. Onie |
| Councilors | Allan C. Villalobos |
| Councilors | Layman D. Gironella |

== Tourist attractions ==
- Tirad Pass National Park and Shrine of Gen. Gregorio del Pilar (Barangay Dapdappig)
- Sibol Hot Spring and Swimming area (Barangay Bussot)
- Mt. Tirad Pass Summit and Mt. Peg-an Camping site (Barangay Bussot)
- Tirad Pass Museum and handicraft center (Poblacion Sur)
- Tubalina Riprap Native Pig-pen Site (Brgy Alfonso (Tubalina))
- Kankantuban Hill Rock Formations (Brgy Alfonso (Tubalina))

== Education ==
The Salcedo-Galimuyod-Sigay-Del Pilar Schools District Office governs all private and public schools within the municipality of Gregorio del Pilar. The Schools District Office (SDO) also oversees the operations of all schools situated in Salcedo, Galimuyod, and Sigay.

=== Primary and elementary schools ===
- Alfonso Elementary School
- Bussot Elementary School
- Butarag Primary School
- Concepcion Elementary School
- Dapdappig Elementary School
- Gregorio del Pilar Central School
- Matue Primary School
- Tubalina Elementary School
- Ul-oling Primary School

=== Secondary schools ===
- Concepcion Adventist Academy
- Gregorio del Pilar National High School

== See also ==
- List of renamed cities and municipalities in the Philippines
