= Gregorio del Pilar =

Filipino general and politician (1875–1899)

The Honorable General Gregorio del Pilar
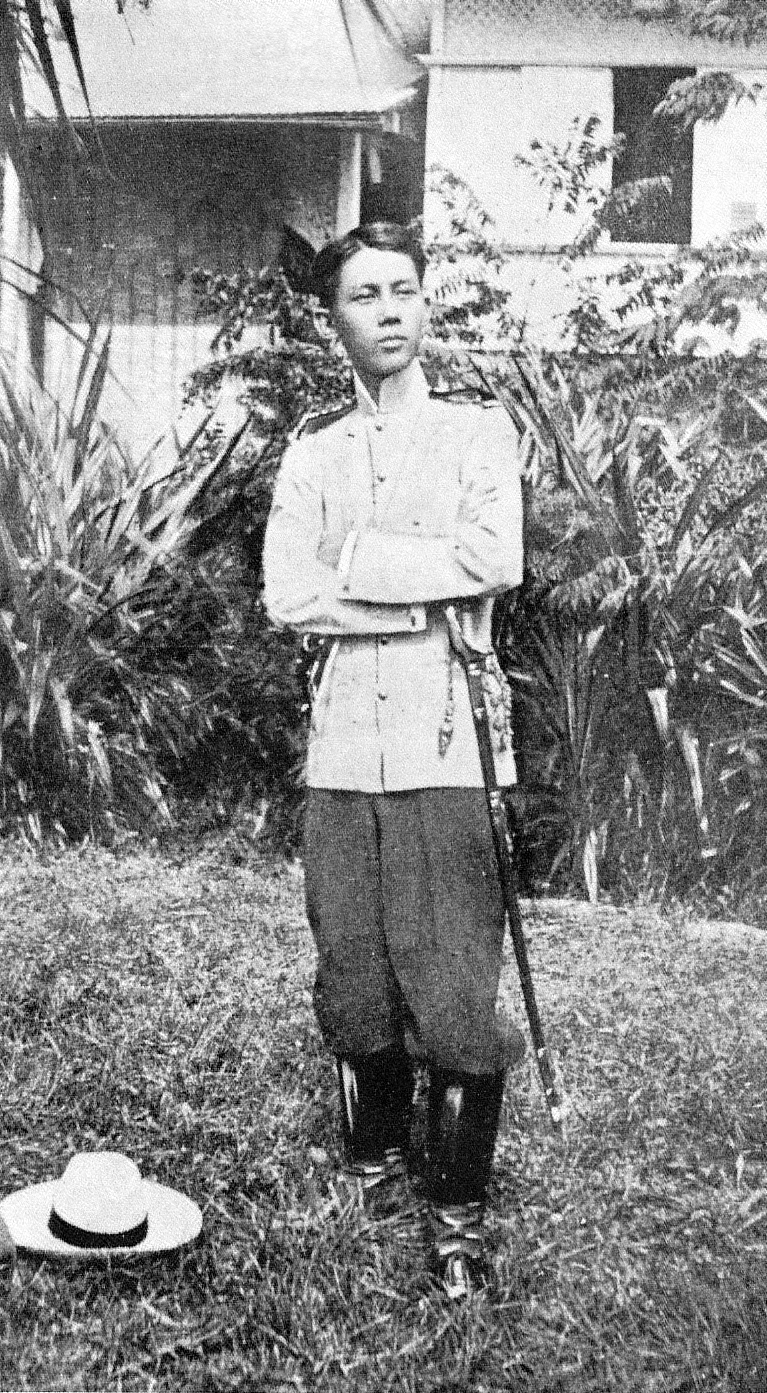

1st Governor of Bulacan
- In office May 28, 1898 – December 2, 1899
- President: Emilio Aguinaldo
- Preceded by: Office created
- Succeeded by: Isidoro Torres

Personal details
- Born: Gregorio H. del Pilar y Sempio; November 14, 1875 San Jose, Bulakan, Bulacan, Captaincy General of the Philippines, Spanish Empire
- Died: December 2, 1899 (aged 24) Tirad Pass, Concepcion, Ilocos Sur, Philippines
- Cause of death: Gunshot wound to the neck
- Parent(s): Fernando H. del Pilar (father); Felipa Sempio (mother)
- Relatives: Marcelo H. del Pilar (uncle); Toribio H. del Pilar (uncle); Deodato Arellano (uncle-in-law); Albert del Rosario (first-cousin-twice-removed)
- Nickname(s): Goyong; The Boy General Agila

Military service
- Allegiance: First Philippine Republic; Republic of Biak-na-Bato; Katipunan; Kakarong Republic
- Branch/service: Philippine Revolutionary Army
- Years of service: 1896–1899
- Rank: Brigadier General
- Commands: Commanding Gen. Aguinaldo's; Rearguard
- Battles/wars: Philippine Revolution: Battle of Kakarong de Sili; Raid at Paombong; Battle of Pasong Balite; Philippine–American War: Battle of Quingua; Battle of Calumpit; Battle of Tirad Pass †

Gregorio Hilario del Pilar y Sempio (Spanish: [ɡɾeˈɣo.ɾjo ðel piˈlaɾ]; Tagalog: [gɾeˈgo.ɾjo del pɪˈlaɾ]; November 14, 1875 – December 2, 1899) was a Filipino general of the Philippine Revolutionary Army during the Philippine–American War.

As one of the youngest generals in the Revolutionary Army, he was known for the successful assault on the Spanish barracks in the municipality of Paombong, his victory on the first phase Battle of Quingua and his last stand at the Battle of Tirad Pass during the Philippine–American War. Because of his youth, he became known as the "Boy General". He was also known as a ladies man and was described by National Artist for Literature Nick Joaquin as the "Byron of Bulacan".

== Early life and education ==
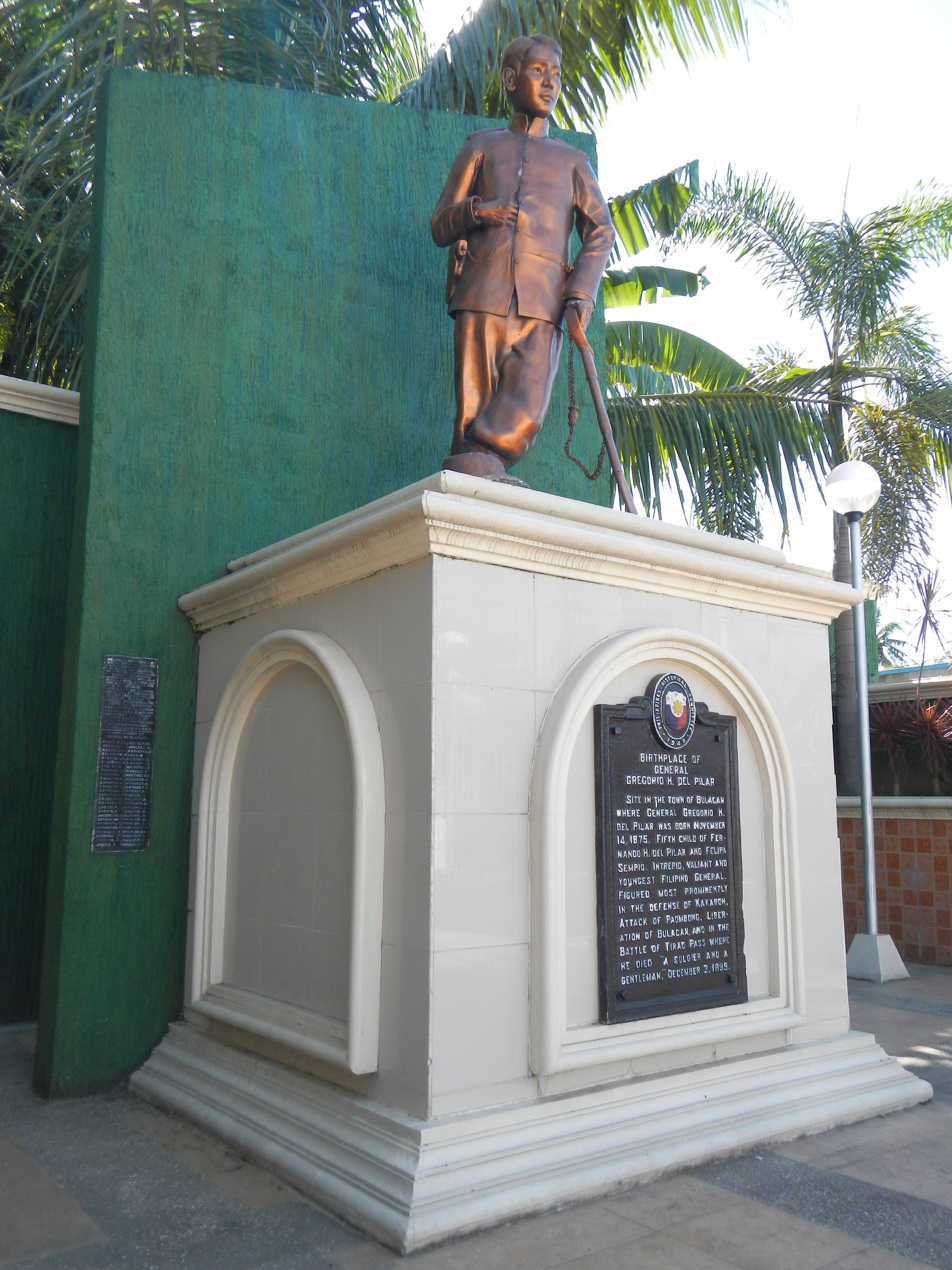
Historical marker and monument of del Pilar's birthplace in Bulakan

Born on November 14, 1875, to Fernando H. del Pilar and Felipa Sempio of Bulacan, Bulacan, the fifth among six siblings. His siblings were María de la Paz del Pilar (b.1865), Andrea del Pilar (b. 1866), Pablo H. del Pilar (b. 1869), Julian H. del Pilar (b. 1872), and Jacinto H. del Pilar (b. 1878). He was part of the del Pilar family (more properly Hilario del Pilar; Hilario was the original surname before the Claveria naming reforms and was contracted to "H.") of the principalia, whose members included his uncles, lawyer-turned-propagandist Marcelo H. del Pilar, editor-in-chief of Diariong Tagalog and La Solidaridad, as well as the priest Toribio H. del Pilar, who was exiled in Guam for his alleged involvement in the 1872 Cavite Mutiny. The del Pilar clan was distantly related to the Gatmaitans. Although principalia, Gregorio del Pilar's branch was relatively poor. It was said that del Pilar had to hawk meat pies as a child to survive.

As a child, he completed his primary education under Maestros Monico Estrella and Romualdo Sempio before being sent to study in Manila. He was enrolled at the Ateneo Municipal de Manila at the age of 15, where he was rated good in Latin, Greek, Spanish, and French, middling in philosophy, and excellent in arithmetic and algebra. During his studies in the Ateneo, he stayed in the house of his paternal aunt, Hilaria H. del Pilar, and her husband, the propagandist Deodato Arellano. He helped his uncle distribute revolutionary pamphlets and other materials. There was one incident in Malolos, where del Pilar stole copies of the book Cuesteones de sumo interes from the parish priest, Father Felipe García, who had a habit of distributing counter-revolutionary materials after mass. These books were set to be distributed after the mass. Del Pilar removed the book covers and pasted the pamphlets inside before distributing them after.

Del Pilar finished his bachelor of arts in March 1896 and had intended to enroll at the School of Arts and Trades and study to become a maestro de obras; however when the Philippine Revolution broke out in August of that year his plans of further study were thwarted. Del Pilar quickly went home to Bulacan and enlisted himself for military service under Colonel Vicente Enríquez.

== Philippine Revolution ==
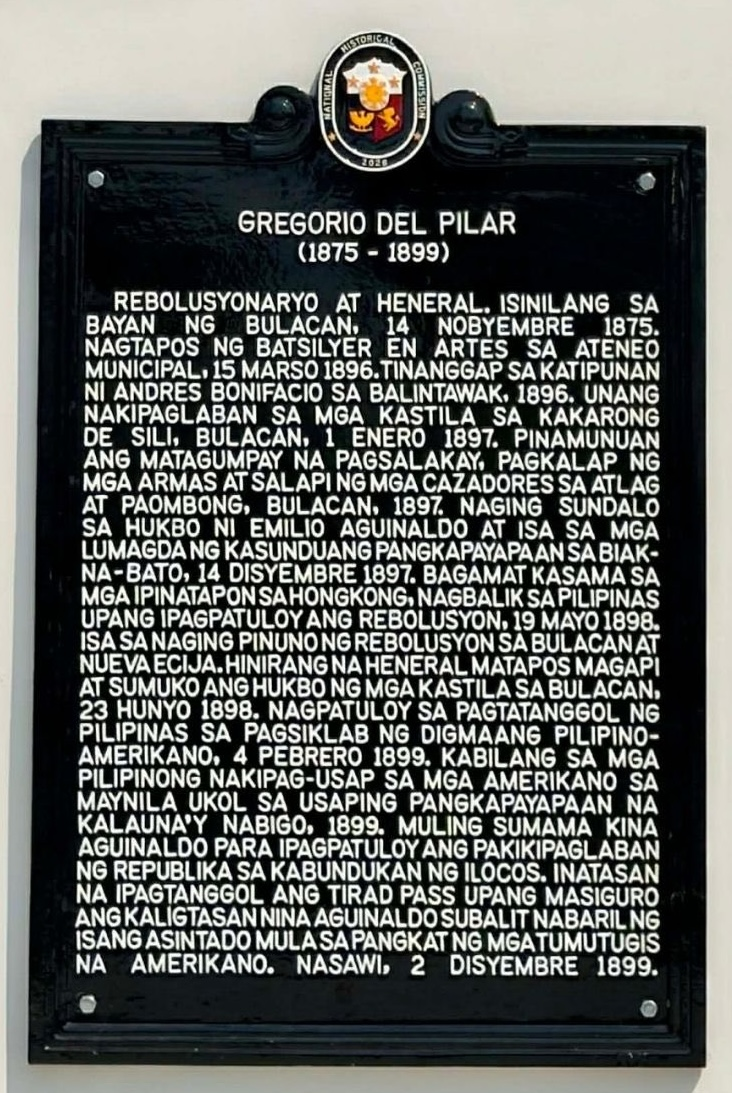
National historical marker installed in 2025 in Candon, Ilocos Sur

At the onset of the revolution, and in response to reports of "successive triumphs" in Cavite, some 3,000 revolutionary forces marched to seize the town of Paombong, Bulacan, forming a military government. Del Pilar was among those who marched towards Paombong, although there are also rumors of him being present during the Cry of Balintawak.

Del Pilar was eventually assigned to the forces of Eusébio Roque (also known as Maestrong Sébio) in Kakarong de Sili, a fort near the town of Pandi. On New Year's Day, 1897, del Pilar participated in the defense of Kakarong de Sili, managing to escape with only nine others before the Spaniards overran the fort. He recounts in his diary:

"As for me, I need not say how I fought. Those who saw me in peril can tell. A Mauser bullet grazed my forehead. Thank God I was spared that danger. Finally, I had to leave the fort because, when I looked for our valiant brothers, none was any longer at his post. This should not cause shame. Self-preservation is the law of God. I passed the night in the barrio of Manatal."

— Gregorio del Pilar, Recounting his 'baptism of fire' and escape during the Battle of Kakarong de Sili.

His courage and bravery in that action won him recognition and a promotion to the rank of lieutenant. He eventually left Roque's unit - Roque was sold out to the Spanish by his own soldiers and executed in February 1897, and del Pilar began to make his way to Imus, Cavite reaching as far as Montalban in February. He eventually returned to Bulacan and joined Adriano Gatmaitán's army, being promoted to captain in the process.

As captain, del Pilar managed feats of bravery. He once managed to single-handedly ambush a priest and his escort of cazadores from Mambog on their way to Malolos. He shot one of the cazadores which prompted the rest to flee. The event is termed as "pinagtambangan", according to the marker that can be found on Malolos Bridge.

Flag of Gregorio del Pilar

This act netted him several Mauser rifles and four sacks of coins, which he distributed to his troops. He decreed that married men be given 50 pesos each, unmarried ones 25 pesos, and the remaining money be sent to Manila to buy a blanket and a cloak for each soldier. On September 3, 1897, del Pilar executed an attack on the Spanish garrison in the town of Paombong. He and ten other men slipped into town in the night and fell upon the cazadores in the basement of the convent during Sunday mass. Del Pilar himself was stationed in the plaza, firing at the second story of the convent to prevent any men from approaching from the windows. They were eventually able to capture 14 Mauser rifles. Other versions of the raid vary, however. Some tellings talk about how del Pilar and his men slipped into town dressed as women, while other versions have them disguised as cazadores. Del Pilar's success in Paombong caught the attention of Emilio Aguinaldo, who promoted the captain to a lieutenant colonel, eventually earning his trust and being let into his inner circle of confidants. Artemio Ricarte noted that del Pilar's feat in Paombong "exalted him to the horns of the moon".

Del Pilar celebrated his promotion to lieutenant colonel by creating a distinctive flag for himself and his battalion: a tricolor with a blue triangle at the hoist, red stripe on top and black at the bottom, taking cues from the Cuban flag. He first unfurled this flag during his participation in the Battle of Pasong Balite in Polo, Bulacan (modern-day Valenzuela, Metro Manila) in 1897.

Due to his closeness to Aguinaldo, del Pilar became one of the signatories of the provisional constitution of the Republic of Biak-na-Bato in November 1897. When negotiations with the Spanish took place in the which concluded with the signing of the Pact of Biak-na-Bato, Aguinaldo took del Pilar with him to exile in Hong Kong.

== Second phase and the Philippine–American War ==
The exiles in Hong Kong organized a Supreme Council, electing del Pilar to a position second only to Tomás Mascardo. Aguinaldo's confidence in del Pilar grew such that he wrote the following about him:

"I took him to Hong Kong, Saigon, and Singapore. He was my man of confidence. I could trust him with everything. Therefore, I had him always at my side until he died."

— Emilio Aguinaldo

Aguinaldo intended to go to Europe. Traveling under assumed names, he took only del Pilar and Colonel José Leyba with him. The trip ended in Singapore, where Aguinaldo conferred with American consul E. Spencer Pratt, learning of the American declaration of war against Spain. Spurred by this, Aguinaldo and the other exiles decided to return to the Philippines to restart the revolution.

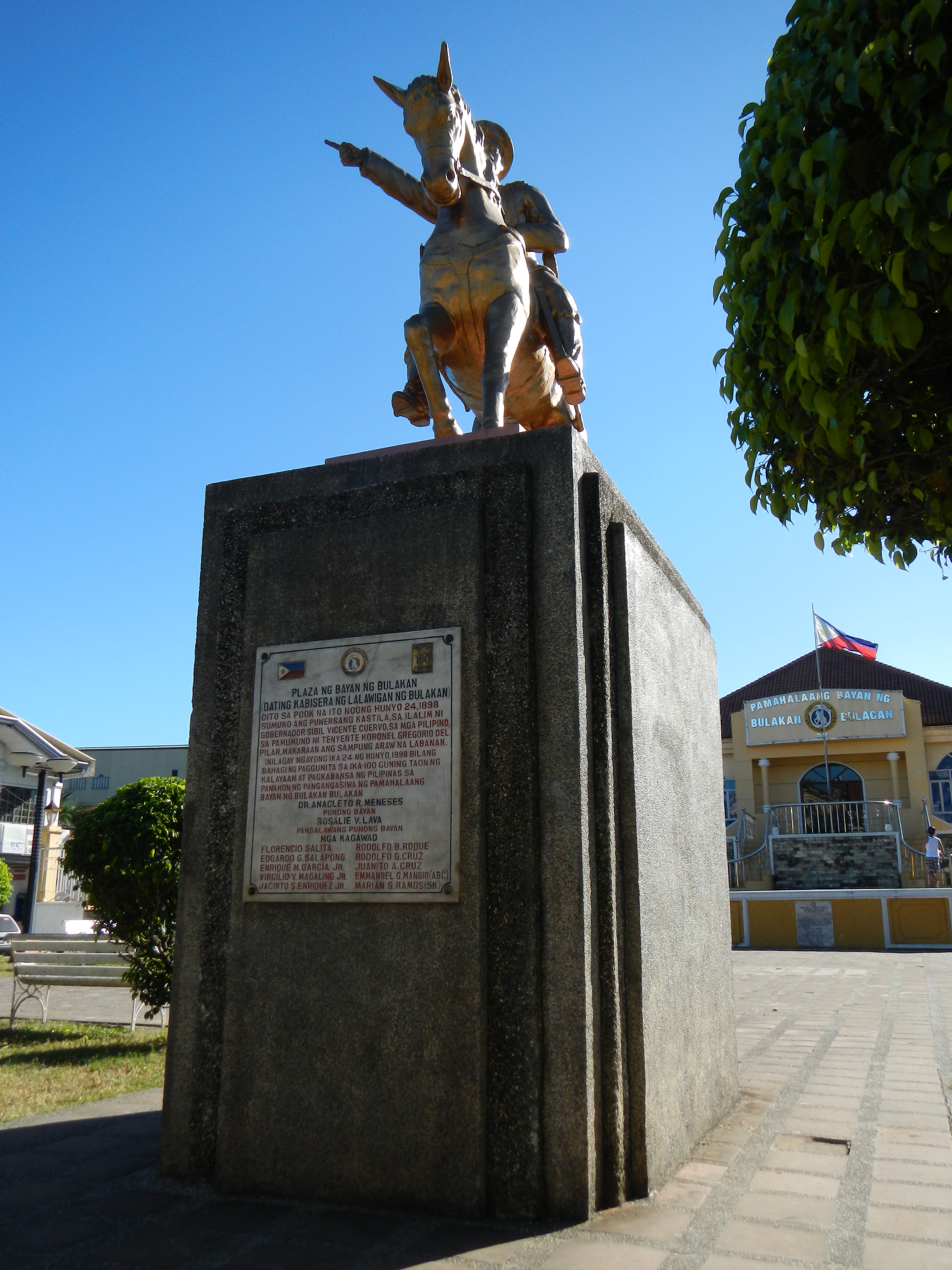
Statue of Gregorio del Pilar in Plaza del Pilar, Bulacan, Bulacan

After the Americans defeated the Spanish in the Battle of Manila Bay, Aguinaldo, del Pilar, and other exiled leaders returned to the Philippines. Aguinaldo named del Pilar Dictator of Bulacan and Nueva Ecija provinces, an honor Aguinaldo would not confer to anybody else.

On del Pilar's return to the Philippines, he set out to liberating his home province of Bulacan, eventually accepting Spanish surrender on June 24, 1898. Del Pilar was then called to relieve the wounded General Pantaleon García and continue operations in Caloocan, ultimately succeeded on August 13, 1898. The Revolutionary Congress was then inaugurated on September 15, 1898, and del Pilar became in charge of the military parade. He was promoted to brigadier general after this event.

When the Philippine–American War broke out in February 1899, following the cession of the Philippines by Spain to the United States in the Treaty of Paris of 1898, del Pilar fought alongside General Antonio Luna in Manila, suffering heavy casualties. Del Pilar's relationships with his fellow generals were contentious at best. General José Alejandrino wrote of del Pilar:

"There was a young pretentious general who set up his headquarters in one of the nearby towns, not bothering even to present himself to General [Antonio] Luna. He did not want to recognize any orders other than those which emanated directly from the Captain General [Emílio Aguinaldo] of whom he was a great favorite. At the headquarters of General Luna it was learned that his gentleman spent days and nights at fiestas and dances which his flatterers offered in his honor."

— Jose Alejandrino

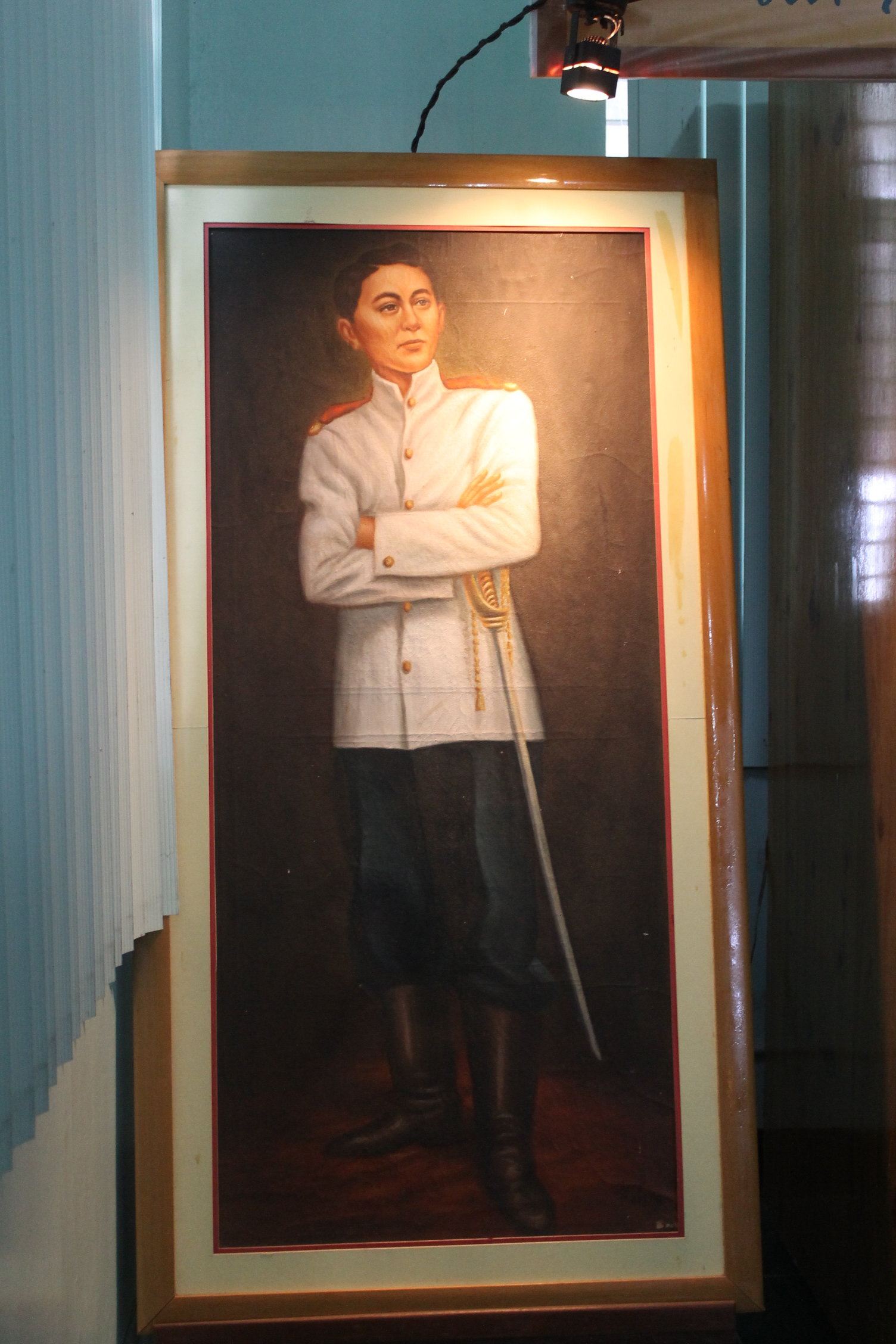
Painting of General Gregorio del Pilar.

Another story between Luna and del Pilar have the two riding together on the front, with Luna so absorbed in what he was saying that he did not notice they were moving into a danger zone. Del Pilar did notice but did not back off because Luna had not. After Manila, del Pilar and his troops moved to Bulacan. Major General Venancio Concepción was placed under his command but the two did not get along. After the fall of Baliuag each blamed the other. Concepción was eventually moved under the command of Luna in Pampanga. Del Pilar, for his part, led his troops to a victory over Major Franklin Bell in the first phase of the Battle of Quingua (modern-day Plaridel, Bulacan) on April 23, 1899. During the battle, his forces repelled a cavalry charge and killed US Colonel John M. Stotsenburg. The Americans were, however, reinforced during the second phase of the Battle and the Filipino forces were forced to retreat. Del Pilar then participated in the Battle of Calumpit alongside General Luna. Luna, however, had left the battle to punish General Tomás Mascardo for insubordination, leaving del Pilar with the defense of the Bagbag River. On Luna's return, the Americans had already succeeded in penetrating the Filipino lines and they were forced to retreat.

On June 4, 1899, del Pilar joined Aguinaldo in San Isidro and received orders to capture Antonio Luna, dead or alive, on charges of high treason. It is said that had Luna not come down himself to Cabanatuan and assassinated by the Kawit Battalion from his headquarters in Bayambang that del Pilar would have gone down as Luna's killer. Del Pilar and Aguinaldo then descended upon General Concepcion's headquarters in Pampanga to relieve him of his position, as he was suspected to be partisan to the assassinated general. Troops surrounded Concepcion's headquarters and sentries were replaced by the presidential guards. Concepción was then relieved of his command on suspicions of a conspiracy being plotted against Aguinaldo.

Del Pilar was then tasked with taking possession of Luna's old headquarters in Bayambang, and of liquidating Luna's former aides-de-camp, Manuel and José Bernal. He arrived in Bayambang on June 7 and managed to capture a younger Bernal brother, Angel, who was arrested and maltreated. Manuel Bernal was captured a few days later, located in the house of the Nable José family. Remedios or Dolores, daughters of the family, was said to be one of del Pilar's last loves. Manuel was tortured in the presence of his younger brother Angel by del Pilar and his brother Julian del Pilar for a week before he was killed. José Bernal was captured soon after, taken to Angeles, Pampanga and murdered by soldiers thereafter.

After this, del Pilar was given command in Pangasinan, where he stayed for five months from June to November 1899. He was also posted in Pangasinan to defend against a possible mutiny from Ilocanos outraged with Luna's assassination, as well as to defend against the Guardia de Honor, a millenarian cult fashioned after the Katipunan. During this time, the American forces were unusually quiet but the revolutionary government failed to capitalize on this opportunity. Del Pilar himself, was engaged in a number of love affairs. In a letter sent to a relative in Bulacan, he asked for the finest of riding boots, while he ordered the best horses in Dagupan to show off his horsemanship.

By November, Tarlac had fallen to the Americans and Aguinaldo was moving northward towards Bayambang. From Bayambang, the fleeing government led an expedition to Santa Barbara. Del Pilar, at the time, had 2,000 troops: 1,000 in the del Pilar Brigade, 350 in the Joven column, 400 in the Kawit Battalion, 100 in the Corps of Lancers, and two vanguard companies. del Pilar led the expedition northward towards Ilocos. During this time he carried a briefcase containing a girl's letter and a lock of hair, from one of his loves in Bulacan.

== Tirad Pass and death ==
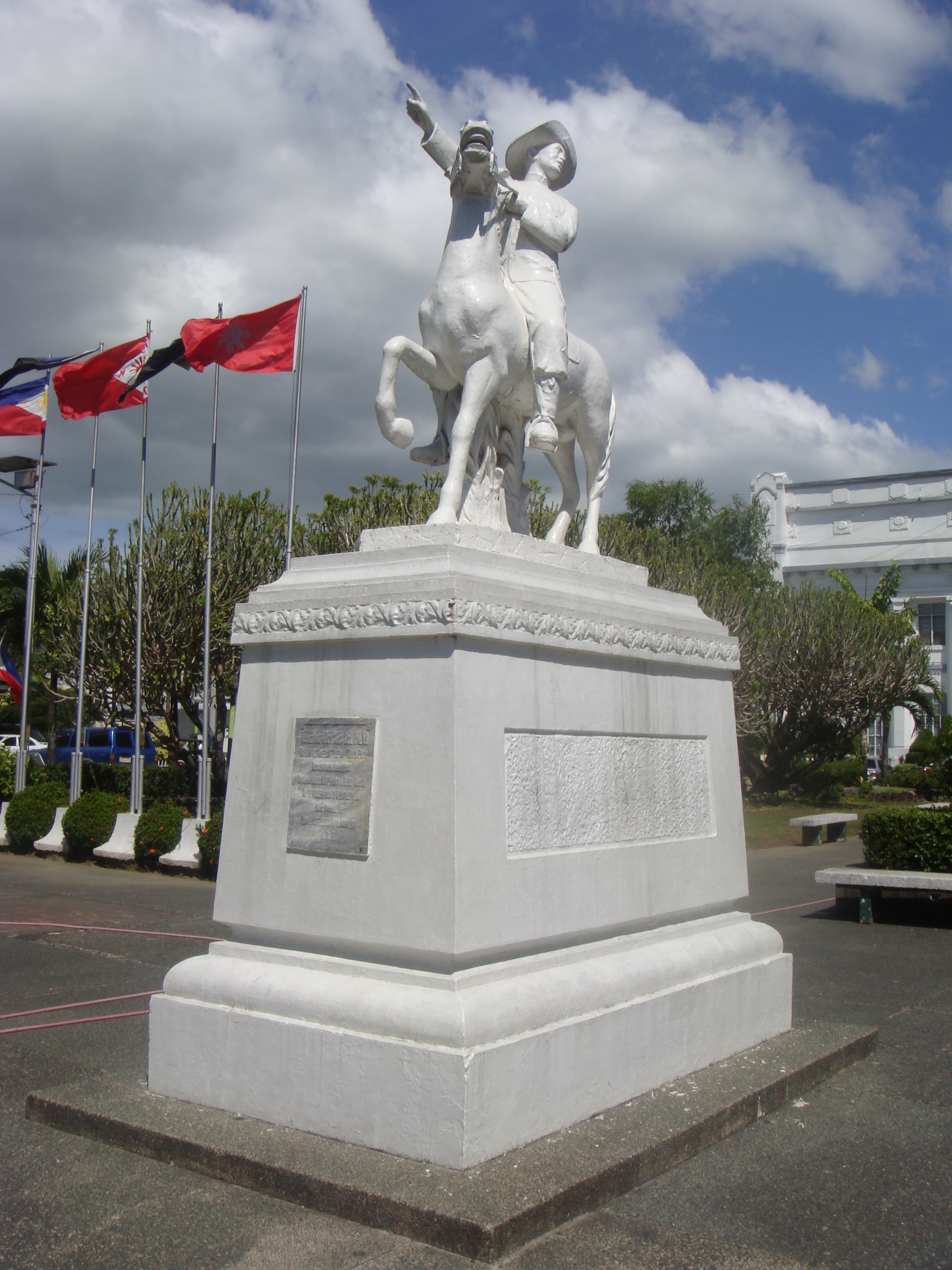
Gregorio del Pilar's tomb in Bulacan

In November 1899, Aguinaldo's party had reached the town of Concepción and climbed the peak of Mount Tirad. Del Pilar ordered three lines of trenches be dug up on the pass and had the "pick of all the men that can be spared" on orders from Aguinaldo. While Aguinaldo and the rest were in Cervantes, Ilocos Sur, del Pilar rode to the rearguard to ensure the safety of the retreat. Word had come that the Americans were advancing on Tirad Pass in an effort to cut off Aguinaldo from the Tinio Brigade situated on the Abra River.

The US Army 33rd Infantry Regiment, under Major Peyton C. March took Concepción on December 1 and began to scale Tirad Pass the next day. Although they had difficulty in attacking the Filipino position, they saw an opening with the aid of a Tingguian Igorot named Januario Galut. The Americans then devised a plan to flank the entrenched defenders from the village of Lingay at the foot of the pass, and from the peak. The combined attack surprised the defenders and the engagement barely lasted six hours. Del Pilar was killed in the skirmish from a shot in the neck, killing him instantly. Of the 60 defenders, only eight remained. After the battle, del Pilar's belongings were taken by the Americans as war trophies, including a handkerchief embroidered with the name Dolores, a locket with a picture of a girl, and his diary. His last entry was:

"The General [Aguinaldo] has given me the pick of all the men that can be spared and ordered me to defend the Pass. I realize what a terrible task has been given me. And yet I felt that this is the most glorious moment of my life. What I do is done for my beloved country. No sacrifice can be too great."

Reports of del Pilar's death varied. Two newsmen, John McCutcheon and Richard Henry Little, and a local newspaper called The Manila Freedom reported accounts which captured the imaginations of American and Filipino readers. McCutcheon and Little both reported how del Pilar was the last to fall; how he continually urged his men during the battle to fight on, appealing to their sense of love for their native land; how he refused to turn away on his white horse until all the men had retreated; and his death when a sharpshooter got the better of him. The Manila Freedom wrote this of del Pilar:

"It is said that in the battle against Major March's troops, Mr. Gregorio del Pilar, surrounded by the dead and the wounded falling by his side, fought a valiant defense, inspiring his troops by his example and, though gravely wounded, had stood atop the trench to animate then when a bullet pierced his heart and he fell among his comrades. When the American troops advanced they found the body of the general on the same spot where he had fallen and the expression on his face was of a command or a supreme desire abruptly interrupted. One of his hands, pressed to his heart, from which blood flowed, clutched a silk handkerchief embroidered with the name of his sweetheart."

— The Manila Freedom

Filipino accounts of del Pilar's death corroborate each other and are less glamorous. Del Pilar's aide-de-camp, Vicente Enríquez, writes:

"I returned to the peak where I had left General del Pilar but midway up I saw him with Lietunants Eugenio [Telesforo] Carrasco and Vicente Morales and the bugler. I told him what I had seen. The general quickened his pace on learning that the Americans could be seen from a certain high point. We arrived at the upper trenches. Then we went to the hilltop where I was and the moment we got there we heard renewed firing and saw our soldiers giving battle. Our soldiers, pointing with their hands, warned del Pilar that the enemy was almost on top of us, but we could see nothing save an irregular movement in the cogongrass. So the general ordered a halt to the firing. And erect on the hilltop he tried to see and distinguish the enemy. While he was doing this he was hit by a bullet. The general covered his face with both hands, falling backward and dying instantly. He wore a new khaki uniform with his campaign insignia, his silver spurs, his polished shoulder straps, his silk handkerchiefs, his rings on his fingers. Always handsome and elegant!"

— Vicente Enriquez

Lieutenant Telesforo Carrasco also recounted:

"The general could not see the enemy because of the cogon grass and he ordered a halt to the firing. At that moment I was handing him a carbine and warning him that the Americans were directing their fire at him and that he should crouch down because his life was in danger and at that moment he was hit by a bullet in the neck that caused instant death. on seeing that the general was dead, the soldiers jumped up as if to flee, but I aimed the carbine at them saying I would blow the skull off the brains of the first to run, whereupon they resumed firing while the body of the general was being removed to the next trench."

— Telesforo Carrasco

Del Pilar's body lay unburied for days, exposed to the elements. While retracing the trail, an American officer, Lieutenant Dennis P. Quinlan, gave the body a traditional US military burial. Upon del Pilar's tombstone, Quinlan inscribed, "An Officer and a Gentleman".

In 1930, del Pilar's body was exhumed and was identified by dental records.

== Memorials ==
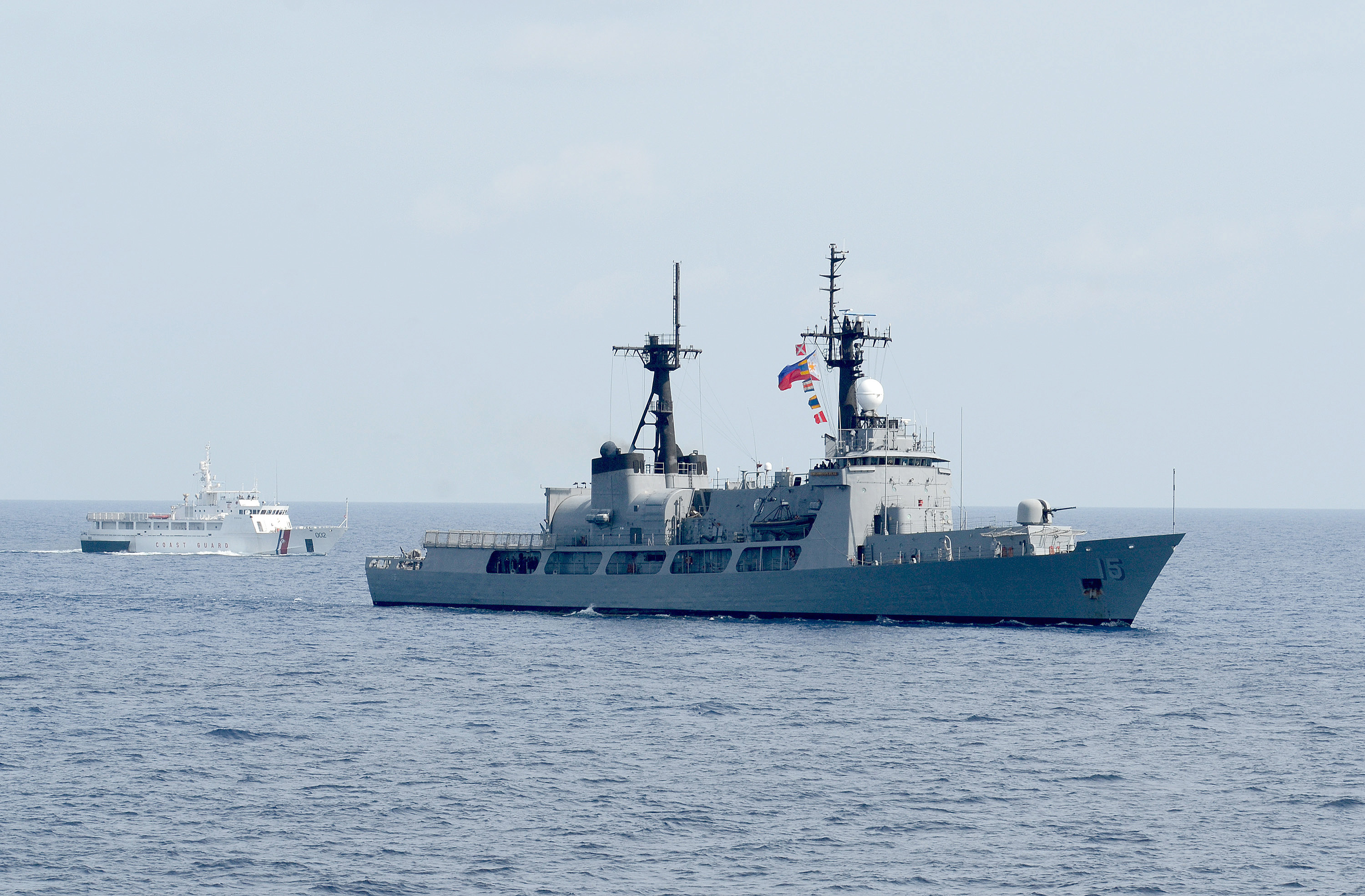
BRP Gregorio del Pilar, a Philippine Navy warship named after Gregorio del Pilar

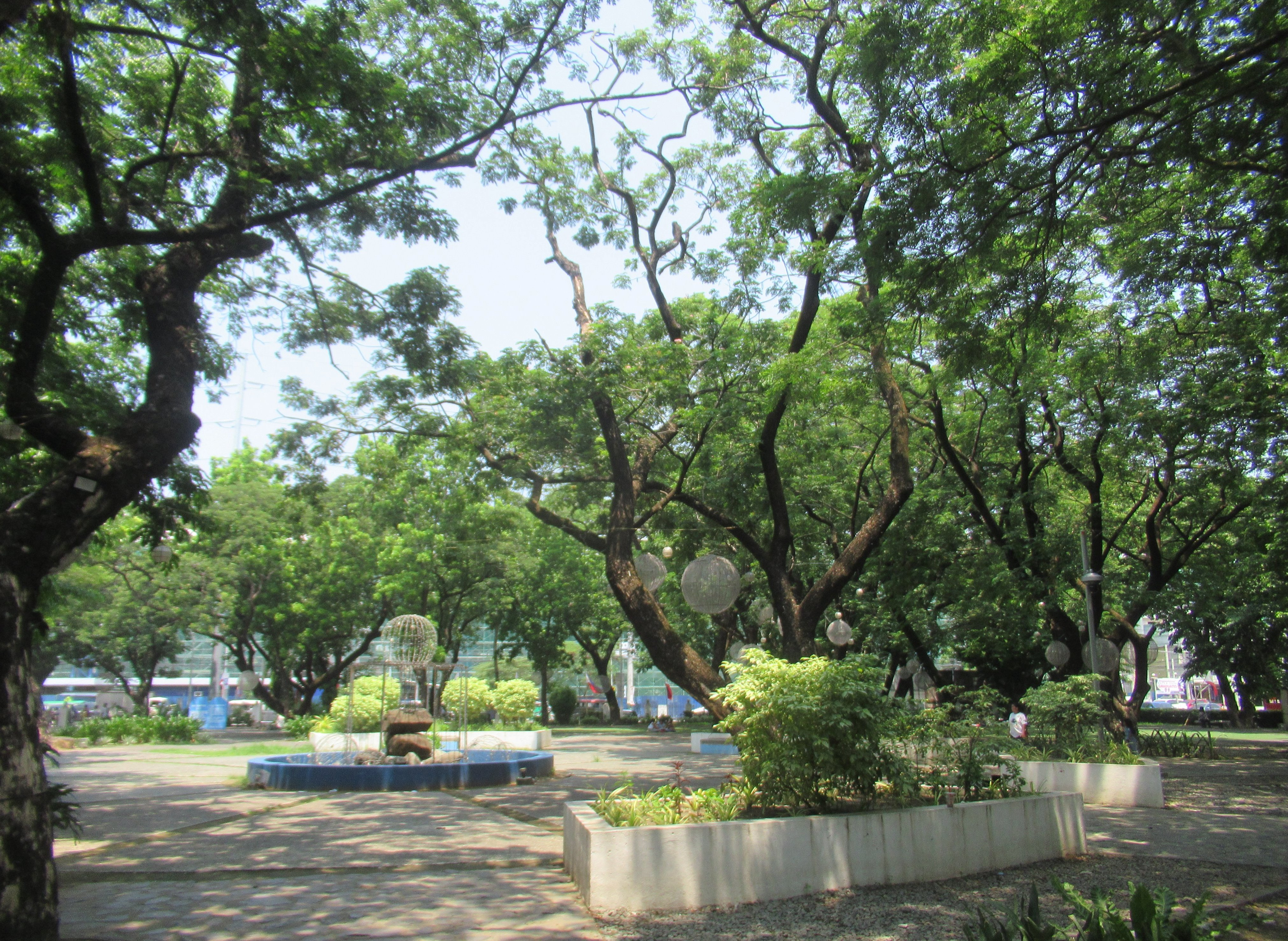
Gregorio H. del Pilar Park (Malolos)

- Fort Del Pilar, home of the Philippine Military Academy in Baguio, is named after him.
- In 1944, the Japanese-sponsored Philippine republic of President Jose P. Laurel issued the Tirad Pass Medal commemorating the battle and del Pilar's sacrifice. A bust of General del Pilar occupies the center of the obverse (front) side of the medal. The Tirad Pass Medal was the only award issued to recognize service to the Laurel government during the Japanese occupation.
- In 1955, the town of Concepcion, Ilocos Sur, where the Battle of Tirad Pass took place, was renamed Gregorio del Pilar in his honor.
- In 2011, the newest vessel of the Philippine Navy, BRP Gregorio del Pilar, was named after him. The ship is a patrol frigate.
- In 2024, Bulacan Capitol Mini-Forest Park is re-branded as Gregorio H. del Pilar Park in his honor at Bulacan Provincial Capitol compound.

== In popular culture ==
- Portrayed by José Padilla Jr. in the postwar film Hen. Gregorio del Pilar (1949), opposite Tessie Quintana.
- His life was shown in the Philippine television news show Case Unclosed as its 13th episode.
- Portrayed by Romnick Sarmenta in the film Tirad Pass: The Last Stand of Gen. Gregorio del Pilar (1996).
- Portrayed by Dingdong Dantes in the official Lupang Hinirang music video produced by GMA Network released in 2010.
- Portrayed by Felix Roco in the film El Presidente (2012).
- Portrayed by Paulo Avelino in the films Heneral Luna (2015) and its sequel, Goyo: Ang Batang Heneral (2018).
- The final chapter of novel Po-on written by National Artist for Literature F. Sionil Jose describes del Pilar's final evening and the Battle of Tirad Pass from the point of view of Eustaquio Samson, a fictional character. Samson is an Ilocano farmer forced to flee his hometown after suffering abuse from a Spanish friar. Having been the confidante of Apolinario Mabini in Rosales town and now acting as his messenger, Samson is cold-shouldered by del Pilar when Samson tells him he lost Mabini's letter; and further suspected of being an enemy spy when Samson claims he was beaten unconscious by the Americans at Candon but somehow woke up alive and abandoned amongst the dead villagers. Samson describes del Pilar as vain, arrogant, and full of youthful folly. He nevertheless joins the Tagalog defenders of the Pass in honor of the "Honorable Cripple" and out of patriotic duty.

== See also ==
- Gregorio del Pilar class frigate, Philippine Navy
- BRP Gregorio del Pilar, Philippine Navy frigate

Government offices
New office	Governor of Bulacan; 1898–1899	Succeeded by Isidro Torres
