= Ipe Salvador =

Ipe Salvador may refer to:

- Felipe Salvador, Filipino revolutionary during the American occupation of the Philippines
- Phillip Salvador, actor from the Philippines
