= Raid on Paombong =

- Part of the Philippine Revolution
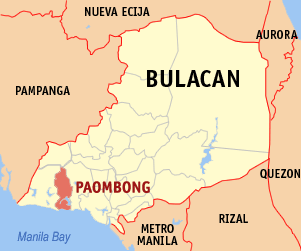
Date	September 3, 1897
Location	Paombong, Bulacan Philippines
Result	Filipino victory

Belligerents
Filipino Revolutionaries	Kingdom of Spain

Commanders and leaders
Gregorio del Pilar	Ramón Blanco y Erenas

Strength
3,000	500

Casualties and losses
34 killed	97 killed

The Raid on Paombong was organized and executed on 3 September 1897 between the Philippine revolutionaries led by Captain Gregorio del Pilar and the Paombong katipuneros on a surprise guerilla raid attack on the Spanish church and convent in the municipality of Paombong.

== Attack ==
The following day, Sunday, Del Pilar and his men stationed themselves at the Church as soon as the Mass was about to begin. When the men who were dressed in their Sunday best got close to the church doors, they surprised the Spanish troops with a shot to the sentry guarding the convent. Del Pilar himself began shooting at the guards who were about to station to the windows, forcing the Spanish soldiers to leave and abandon their guns. The attack was successfully carried out with the capture of 14 Mauser rifles and other supplies. It is often described as one of the finest assaults during Philippine Revolution. Shortly thereafter, Philippine President Emilio Aguinaldo raised Gregorio del Pilar to the rank of lieutenant colonel.
