= Guardia de Honor =

The Guardia de Honor de Maria or simply Guardia de Honor ("Honor Guard of the Virgin Mary" or "Honor Guard") was a Philippine peasant organization most active during the Philippine–American War. Starting out as a cofradia founded by the Dominicans, the Guardia de Honor became increasingly militant during the Philippine Revolution. The First Philippine Republic and the subsequent colonial government both saw the Guardia de Honor as brigands and tulisanes and sought to suppress them. The Guardia de Honor was most active in the provinces of Pangasinan and Tarlac, and was active alongside the similar Santa Iglesia movement in Pampanga.

== History ==
=== Origins ===
The Guardia de Honor was founded by Dominican priests in Pangasinan as a confraternity whose purpose was to instill devotion to the Virgin Mary in its followers. Juan Alvarez Guerro in De Manila a Tayabas wrote about the confraternities in Lucban, particularly about the Guardia de Honor, describing the society as a women's association "which entertains no distinction of class or age". Members were distinguished by a silver medal hanging on a blue ribbon. The organization was described as perfectly organized and based upon the continuous veneration of the Virgin. The hermana mayor would assign three sisters to pray in shifts throughout the day and night. This was done without fail.

Alvarez Guerro noted that during some days of Lent and the Holy Week, members of the Guardia de Honor would go to a mountain called El Calvario to give offerings to Mary. Of particular note is the offering given at the end of the last novena of May, as all the flowers and foliage of the temple is recharged, with a colossal rosary made of vegetables that is suspended from the vault, descending from the center of the nave forming pavilions and ending in the presbytery with a cross made of flowers. The feast ends by offering dahlias at the feet of the Virgin. The adherents are described to be dressed immaculately in satin, like brides.

The Guardia de Honor particularly found popularity among adherents in Pangasinan and contiguous provinces. By 1877 the cofradia had spread as far as Tarlac and Pampanga. The size of its membership justified division between regional and local units. Alvarez Guerrero's account, in particular, described proceedings of the Guardia de Honor in Tayabas (now Quezon) province.

=== Radicalization during the Philippine Revolution ===
By the 1890s a wave of revolutionary fervor had changed the Guardia de Honor to something more radical. The group's activities between 1896-98 are unclear, but two Augustinian priests, Joaquin Duran and Ulpiano Herrero, testified that the Guardias were employed by Dominicans to subvert the teachings of the Katipunan. A pamphlet in Pampanga issued by Father Zacarias Lizarraga in April 1898 supports this claim, calling upon the Guardias to pray fervently and increase their courage so that Spain might win the war against the United States. Lizarraga, who was also the Director of the Guardia de Honor, enjoined cofrades to oppose the Katipunan, who had been punished by the Church with excommunication. With the revolution in full swing, most clerics were arrested by katipuneros and put to jail by revolutionary provincial leaders. There are claims that, faced with a lack of spiritual guidance, and perhaps spurred on by Dominicans in Manila, abandoned parishioners in Pangasinan rose up in counter-revolt against the Katipunan. However, modern research suggests that there was indication that the Guardias engaged in resistance against the Republic because of these factors.

After the terms of the Pact of Biak-na-Bato, which enforced a truce between Emilio Aguinaldo and the Spanish colonial government and the former's subsequent exile, members of the cofradia became "pseudo-guards" and were described as similar to other politico-religious movements such as Gabinistas in Pampanga, the Colorums in San Cristobal, the Babailanes, or even the Katipunan itself. Considered a "new form of brigandage" by the colonial government, Guardias were persecuted by the Guardia Civil. The Bishop of Vigan, meanwhile, prohibited its religious ceremonies.

In August 1897, the governor of Pangasinan noted a marked increase of membership in the society. Guardias were observed to be preparing machetes, particularly in the towns of Calasiao and Urbiztondo, which were famed for their foundries. This was ignored by the governor in order to keep the semblance of peace. By October more reports of unusual preparations from the Guardias circulated in the province, and by February 1898, the "fanatics" commenced their "pillaging" throughout Pangasinan, prompting a response from the government. Don Juan Ferrer, relating his eyewitness account, relays that the Guardia de Honor, being a society to venerate the Virgin Mary, prayed to her for guidance in the struggle against the Spanish. Arrested Guardias in December 1898 also testified that their organization was broken up by the Spanish colonial government on account of the Revolution, and that their primer jefe was Aguinaldo himself.

=== Philippine–American War ===
From October 1898 to December 1899, the established Revolutionary Government received multiple reports of continuing disorder in the north, particularly in the provinces of Tarlac and Pangasinan. Reports of highwaymen and bandits, variously referred to as agrabiados and discontentos, appearing in the countryside and attacking prominent families and administrative units loyal to the new government were frequent. These disturbances threatened political reorganization as well as plans for the expected conflict with the United States. By December 1898, peace and order in the provinces of La Union, Pangasinan, and Tarlac had deteriorated to a critical point. These attacks followed a pattern of rebels assaulting poorly-defended towns, sacking government buildings, destroying official records, robbing Filipinos of consequence as well as Chinese businessmen. The towns of Bamban and Camiling in particular were targets of a popular uprising on Christmas Day 1898.

=== Government response ===
Response in the affected provinces was severe. General Francisco Macabulos, military commander of Pangasinan and Tarlac, blamed disturbances on the "friar-instigated Guardia de Honor, who sought nothing but the disturbance of the established order". Known Guardias were arrested and tried in military courts while promising amnesty to those who would surrender. He also ordered the disarming of the civilian population lest they also join the movement. A cordon sanitaire was thrown around the province of Tarlac and martial law was declared, hampering Republican efforts to combat the Americans by forcing them to dedicate troops in Tarlac. Efforts to withdraw detachments from Tarlac were futile, with guerillas ready to attack any poblacion left defenseless.

The response from the government in Malolos was more cautious. The Secretary of Agriculture, perhaps aware of the religious nature of the unrest, suggested that Gregorio Aglipay be sent to calm the province. Troops were sent to guard only the towns, using a policy of attraction to get the peasants to return to a peaceful life. This approach did not work, and popular unrest in the provinces only grew. Leaders would refer to themselves as "Brigadier General" and employ a strategy of terror to drain resources and popular support from the government. This, along with urgent letters from General Macabulos, spurred the government to adopt a policy of assassinating the leaders of the popular uprising.

Pedro Perdoche, a former corporal in the Guardia Civil and a suspected cabecilla of the Guardia de Honor, was acknowledged as one of the leaders in the Camiling uprising. In January 1899, Tranquilino Paguirigan, Camiling's presidente, and some military officials plotted to have him assassinated. They invited him and his men to a party on the pretext that the local officials of Camiling were ready to join him. Pedroche accepted, and during the merrymaking, he and his men were massacred. This event was publicized around different towns in hopes of quelling the rebellion, but this had no effect. By the end of February 1899, the trouble had become serious enough to be considered a general uprising. The town of San Carlos, Pangasinan, for example, tried to request reinforcements to defend its 23,000 inhabitants against "those who call themselves discontented or oppressed and Guards of Honor."

=== American response ===
By 1899 the American forces had made a foothold in Central Luzon. General Elwell S. Otis, commander of the "pacification" forces in the Philippines, grasped neither the military nor social realities of the uprising he faced. Taking from his experience in the Indian Wars, Otis ordered a crackdown on the leaders of the groups. An "established redeemer" was arrested in Calumpit, Bulacan and jailed for "illegal money exactions from the more ignorant natives", while General Arthur MacArthur decided to eradicate the Guardia de Honor stronghold in Cabaruan, which he took in an almost bloodless skirmish.

The occupation of Cabaruan did not yield any long-term result. Wary of the unusual number of people in Cabaruan, and the seeming quiet, the Americans stationed in Dagupan frequently sent detachments to observe the place. The Americans were concerned about conflicting reports. There were multiple reports that the streets of Cabaruan were clean and perfectly laid out, and none of the town's people were found to be engaged in work. An observer noted that while the townspeople were supposedly organized as "some new religion", their real objective was "extorting money from the public". In reality, the residents of Cabaruan were engaged in continual raids into the farms and property of neighboring towns. Patrols from Dagupan frequently heard rumors from nearby towns of chronic criminal activity and sordid rites being committed in Cabaruan, although they could do nothing but perform wary surveillance. Any attempt to visit Cabaruan by surprise resulted in the military patrols being greeted by the Cabaruan brass band, yielding no evidence of their activity.

Cabaruan was not the only Guardia de Honor stronghold during this time. Similar events could be found in Tayug, where Guardias were led by Hilario Tumbaga, a "Cardinal" of the Guardia de Honor. The Americans, after razing Tayug to the ground in an operation, unwittingly allowed Tumbaga, who was known as a healer and a prophet, to establish a new barrio dominated by Guardias. Ramon Estabillo, another Guardia, founded a new town near San Nicolas named Natividad. Both Tumbaga and Estabillo were eventually arrested in 1901 on grounds of extortion and larceny. In Santa Ana, some Guardias led by a lesser prophet settled there after leaving Cabaruan due to disputes regarding food supply.

The situation in Cabaruan itself was becoming less tenable. By 1901 the influx of peasants from all over the province left Cabaruan with little food to spare. Attacks on the rich landowning class and poorer tenant farmers increased in an effort to mitigate this crisis. The increase in attacks only served to mobilize American forces against the Guardias. On March 3, 1901, in response to the demands of the Pangasinan principalia, American forces moved to suppress the Guardias in Cabaruan and Santa Ana, leading to the arrests of their leaders. They were executed on June 1, 1901. After this event, the Guardia de Honor disintegrated and began the political reorganization of the province.

== Organization ==
Although starting out as a confraternity organized by Dominican priests, by the turn of the 20th century the Guardia de Honor was heavily radicalized. Its main leaders were situated in Cabaruan, where adherents were led by a man named Baltazar, who referred to himself as "God Almighty". Under Baltazar were Antonio Valdez, Gregorio Claveria, and Maria de la Cruz, who were "Christ", the "Holy Ghost", and "the Virgin Mary", respectively. The Guardias were also led by twelve lieutenants who were called the "Savior's Apostles". At its peak the Guardia de Honor had members throughout most of Pangasinan, Tarlac, and La Union.

As a cofradia, the Guardia de Honor was organized by Dominican priests whose purpose was to instill devotion to the Virgin Mary. Its members were mainly women, and was led by a hermana mayor who would organize the sisters in shifts to ensure that at least one of them was praying at any given time of the day.

== See also ==
- Felipe Salvador
- Philippine–American War
