= Mount Tirad =

Mountain in Ilocos Sur, Philippines

- Location within Philippines

Highest point
- Elevation: 1,154 m (3,786 ft)
- Coordinates: 17°09′26″N 120°39′02″E

Geography
- Location: Luzon
- Country: Philippines
- Regions: Cordillera Administrative Region; Ilocos Region
- Provinces: Ifugao; Ilocos Sur; Mountain Province
- Parent range: Cordillera Central

Mount Tirad also known as Tirad Pass is a 1,154-metre (3,786 ft) mountain peak near Cervantes, Ilocos Sur, Philippines. It ranks as the 29th highest mountain in Ilocos Sur and the 598th highest mountain in the Philippines.

Battle of Tirad Pass historical marker

Tirad Pass is of historical significance as the place where General Gregorio del Pilar was killed on December 2, 1899, during the Philippine–American War. In April 2022, President Rodrigo Duterte signed a law declaring Tirad Pass a protected landscape under the National Integrated Protected Areas System.
