= Battle of Tirad Pass =

1899 battle of the Philippine–American War

- Part of the Philippine–American War
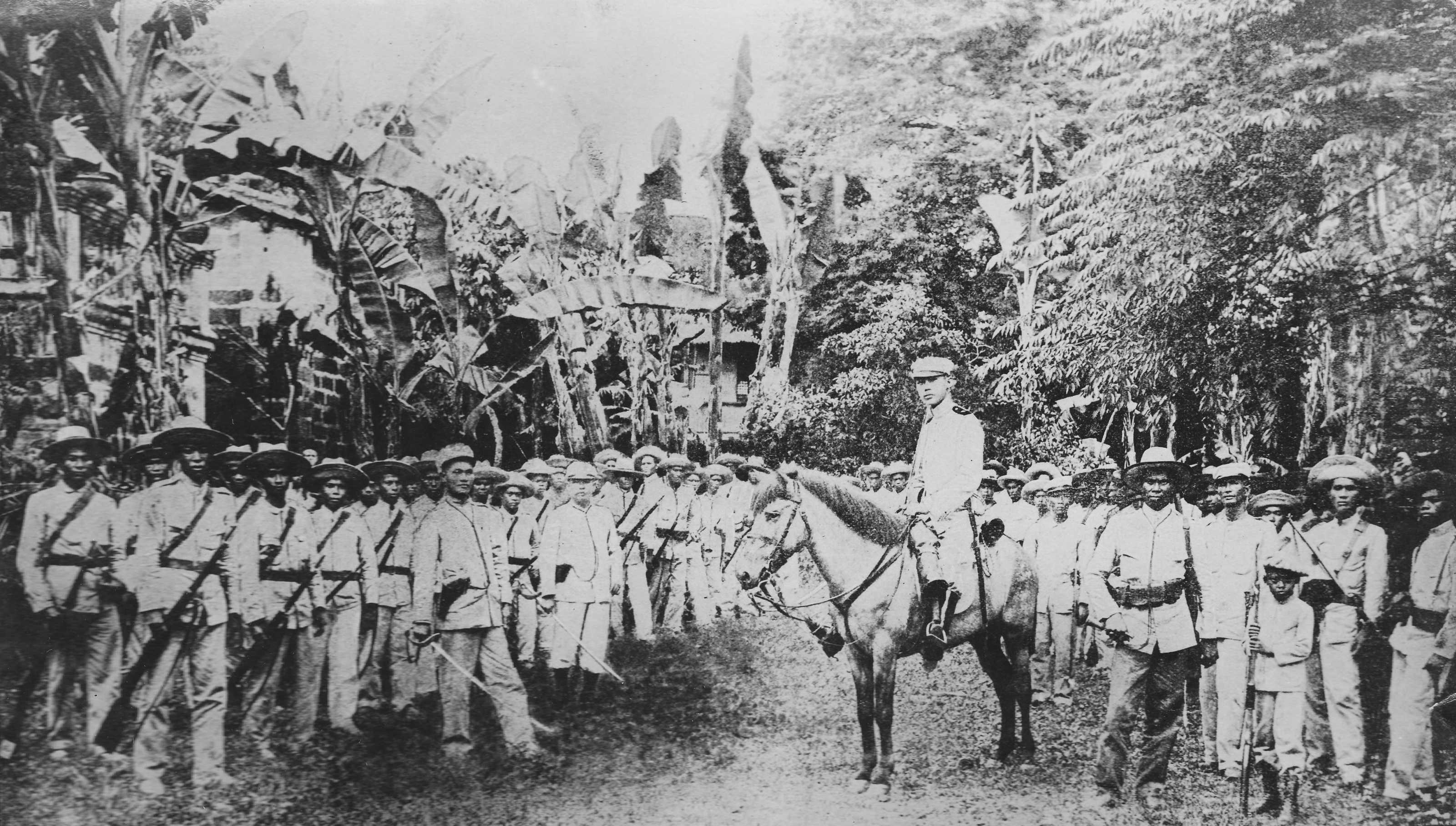
- General Gregorio del Pilar and his troops, c. 1898
Date	December 2, 1899
Location	Tirad Pass, Ilocos Sur, Philippines 17°08′32″N 120°37′46″E
Result	See aftermath

Belligerents
United States	Philippine Republic

Commanders and leaders
Peyton C. March	Gregorio del Pilar †

Strength
600	60

Casualties and losses
3 killed 9 wounded	52 killed
- Location within Philippines

Location of Tirad Pass.

The Battle of Tirad Pass, sometimes referred to as the Philippine Thermopylae, (Note: In reference to the Battle of Thermopylae, in which the Greek forces managed to hold off the Persian army despite being outnumbered.) took place during the Philippine–American War on December 2, 1899, in northern Luzon in the Philippines. A 60-man Filipino rear guard commanded by Brigadier General Gregorio del Pilar succumbed to more than 500 Americans, mostly of the 33rd Volunteer Infantry Regiment under Major Peyton C. March, while delaying the American advance to ensure that President Emilio Aguinaldo and his troops escaped.

== Background ==
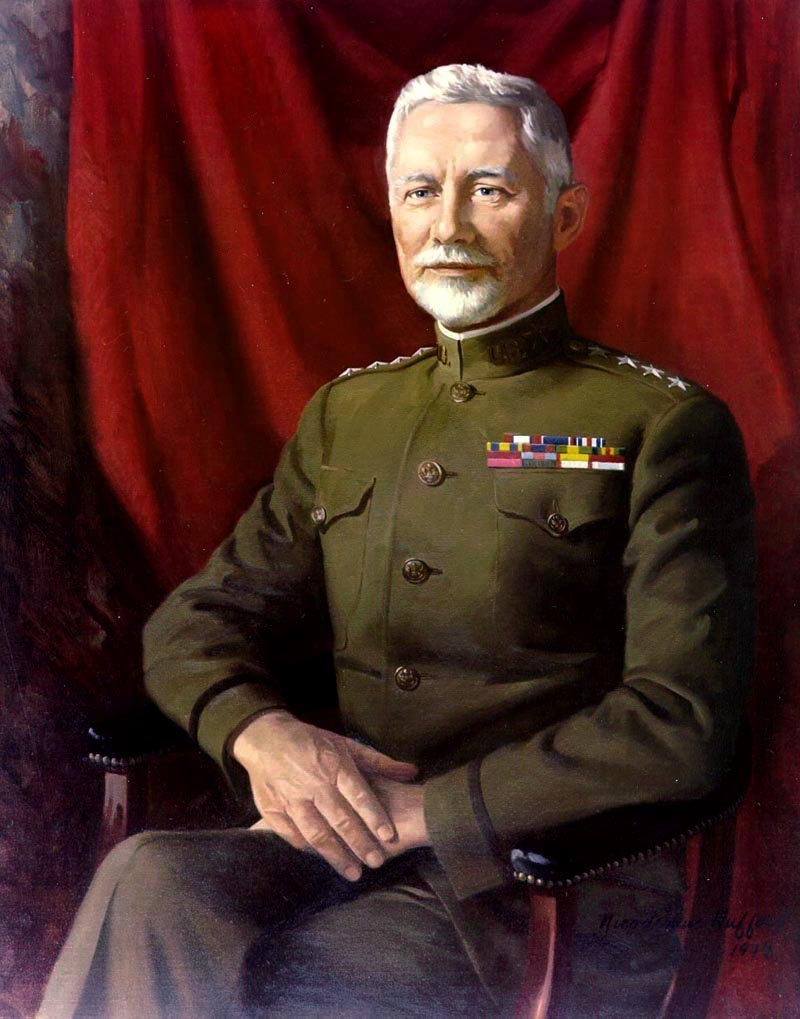
Peyton March, as painted by Nicodemus David Hufford III

The retreat of Aguinaldo from Bayambang, through the mountainous terrain began on November 13, 1899, after he had disbanded the regular Filipino army into guerrilla units. On November 23, Aguinaldo's party reached the pass, which provided a strategic bottleneck. It was to be protected by a rear guard under General Gregorio del Pilar, who noticed the advantageous terrain of Tirad Pass (Pasong Tirad as it was locally called), and hunkered down to defend it while Aguinaldo escaped through the mountains. The hand-picked force of Filipinos, which was the remaining contingent of Antonio Luna's army, constructed several sets of trenches and stone barricades on both shoulders of the pass, as well as on top of its 4,500-foot (1,400 m) height. Meanwhile, during early November, Major March had been given the task of pursuing Aguinaldo. By November 30, March and his men, in haste to catch the Philippine president, marched through Candon, Santo Tomas, La Union, and Salcedo, Ilocos Sur. He and his men found out that Aguinaldo had passed through Salcedo five days previously, and that fueled the Americans' march to Concepcion (now named Gregorio del Pilar), a town overlooked by the steep pass, which they reached by December 1. March had no clear idea of the size of Aguinaldo's rear guard, but he had calculated it to be no more than 150 men.

== Battle ==
On the morning of December 2, the Americans advanced up the trail but were met with a steady volley of fire, enabling them to climb to only around 300 feet. The Americans abandoned the idea of a frontal assault and took cover in the zigzag trail. Texan sharpshooters positioned themselves on a hill overlooking the trenches, whittling down the Philippine rear guard with measured volleys. Nevertheless, the Filipinos continued to hold their ground, utilizing focused volley fire that repelled other advances by the Americans. March then sent elements of their force with an Igorot villager named Januario Galut to determine the Filipino positions and outflank the defenders. While the flanking movement was still in progress, three American soldiers rushed to the battlefield but found themselves receiving Filipino fire. Two died, being the only Americans killed in the encounter, while the third was badly wounded.

More than five hours after the battle began, the Americans began to feel the scorching heat of the midday sun and decided to rest for a while amidst the rocks. Later that day, the flanking party succeeded in their task, and the Americans fell upon the rear of the outnumbered defenders, defeating them. Over the course of the battle, 52 of the 60 Filipinos were killed. Among the dead was General del Pilar, shot through the neck at the height or end of the struggle (depending upon which eye-witness account is to be believed).

== Aftermath ==
The Americans lost two dead and nine wounded, most of which resulted from the repelled frontal assault. Despite nearly total annihilation, however, the Filipinos under Del Pilar held off the Americans long enough for Aguinaldo to escape. Among the 60 Filipino soldiers, only eight survived, namely Colonel Vicente Enriquez, Captain Juan H. Del Pilar, Lieutenant Telesforo Pérez Carrasco, Lieutenant José Enriquez, "Juanchito" Del Pilar, Emilio Garcia, Iñigo De Jesus, and one unnamed officer. Upon receiving word of the battle outcome from Lieutenant José Enriquez (Colonel Enriquez's younger brother) and "Juanchito" Del Pilar (General Gregorio Del Pilar's cousin) in nearby Cervantes, Ilocos Sur, Aguinaldo and his party resumed their retreat into the mountains of what was then Bontoc province, pursued by March and his men. March broke off the pursuit on March 7. On September 6, 1900, Aguinaldo reached Palanan, Isabela, where he continued to lead the guerrilla campaign he had begun on November 13, 1899. He was captured there on March 23, 1901, by men of General Frederick Funston.

According to Filipino writer and historian Nick Joaquin, however, the main objective of the Americans was not to pursue Aguinaldo but to keep him away from linking up with the elite Tinio Brigade, which was under the command of Manuel Tinio. In his critical book of essays A Question of Heroes he notes that Tirad Pass was an "exercise in futility" in that it only allowed Aguinaldo to "run to nowhere".

Del Pilar's diary was recovered among the possessions looted by the victorious Americans, who had stripped him bare of his military decorations, his uniform and his personal belongings, leaving him, as the eyewitness, correspondent Richard Henry Little wrote, "We carved not a line and we raised not a stone, But we left him alone with his glory". The exact wording of its poignant final entry, written on the night of December 1, differs somewhat between sources quoting it. Two versions are:

The General has given me the pick of all the men that can be spared and ordered me to defend the Pass. I realize what a terrible task has been given me. And yet I feel that this is the most glorious moment of my life. What I do is done for my beloved country. No sacrifice can be too great.

The General has given me a Platoon of available men and has ordered me to defend this Pass. I am aware what a difficult task has been given me. Nevertheless, I feel that this is the most glorious moment of my life. I am doing everything for my beloved country. There is no greater sacrifice.

Del Pilar's corpse lay unburied for three days. American officer Dennis Quinlan, with a group of Igorots, later buried his body and left a plaque, "Gen. Gregorio del Pilar, Died December 2, 1899, Commanding Aguinaldo's Rear Guard, An Officer and a Gentleman."

== Memorials ==
In honor of Del Pilar's heroism, the Philippine Military Academy was named Fort Del Pilar and a historical marker placed at the site of the battle.

The Battle of Tirad Pass and the death of Del Pilar was also commemorated during World War II when the Japanese-backed government of President José P. Laurel sought to re-kindle anti-American sentiment by reviving memories of the Philippine–American War with the creation of the Tirad Pass Medal. The design of the obverse (front) of the medal included a bust of Del Pilar and a view of Tirad Pass. The design of the reverse (back) includes the date 1944. The Tirad Pass Medal was the only military medal or decoration issued by the Laurel government during the Japanese occupation.

In 1955, the town where the battle happened, Concepcion, was renamed Gregorio del Pilar, Ilocos Sur.

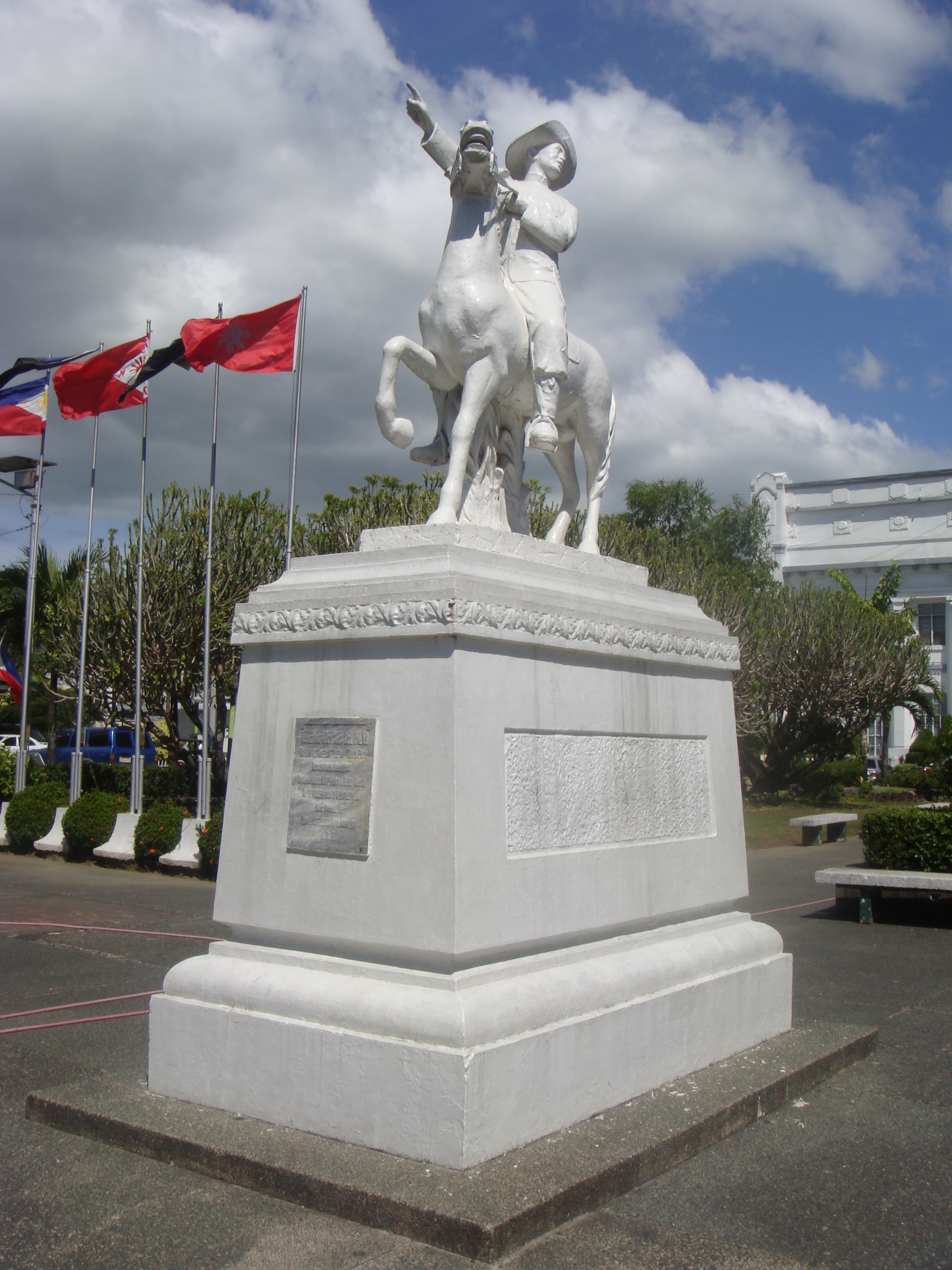
Gregorio del Pilar's statue (Bulacan Provincial Capitol plaza)

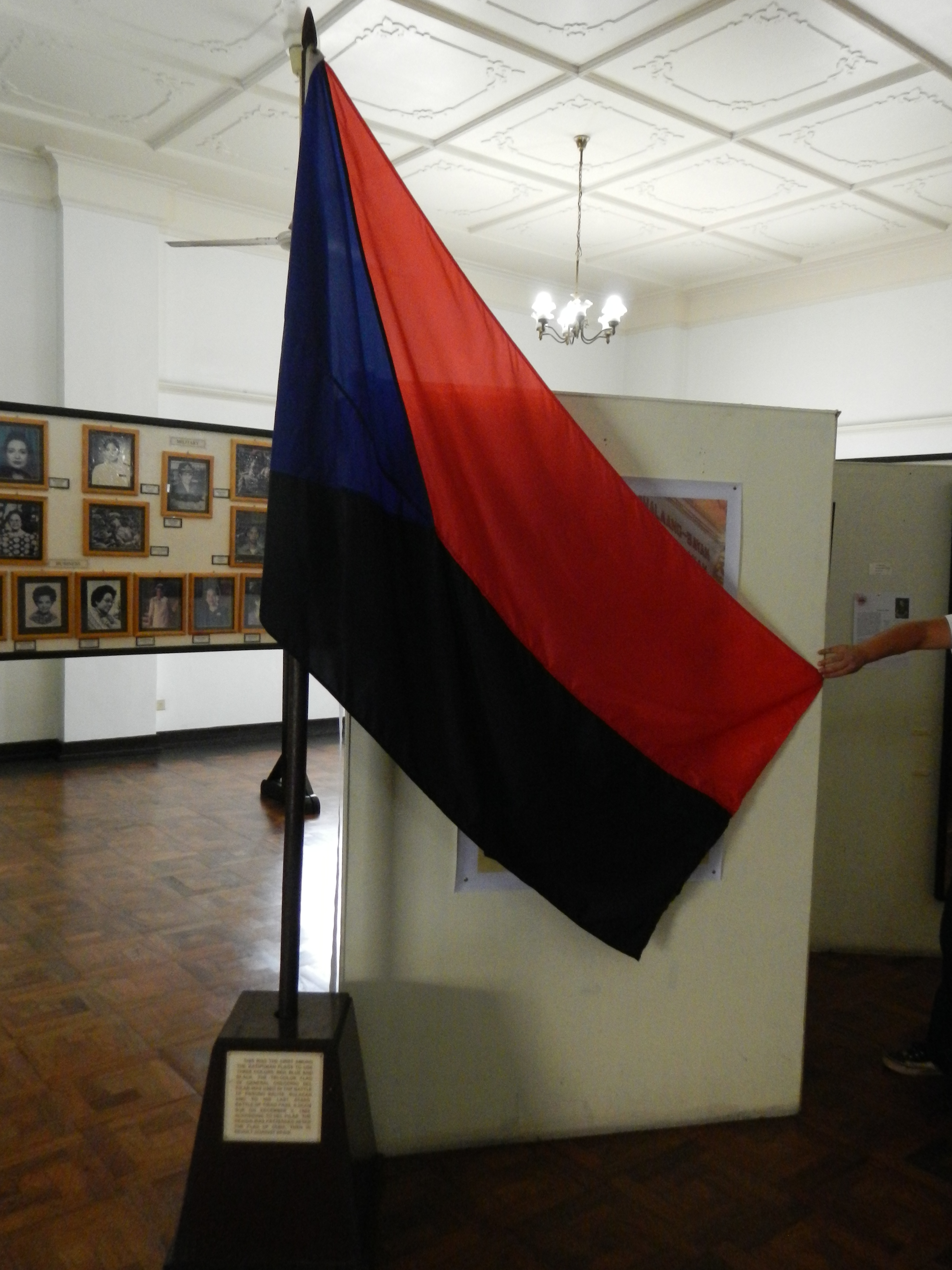
The tricolor flag of Gen. Gregorio del Pilar (in the Battle of Pasong Balite, Bulacan & Battle of Tirad Pass, Ilocos Sur, December 2, 1899, patterned after the Flag of Cuba)

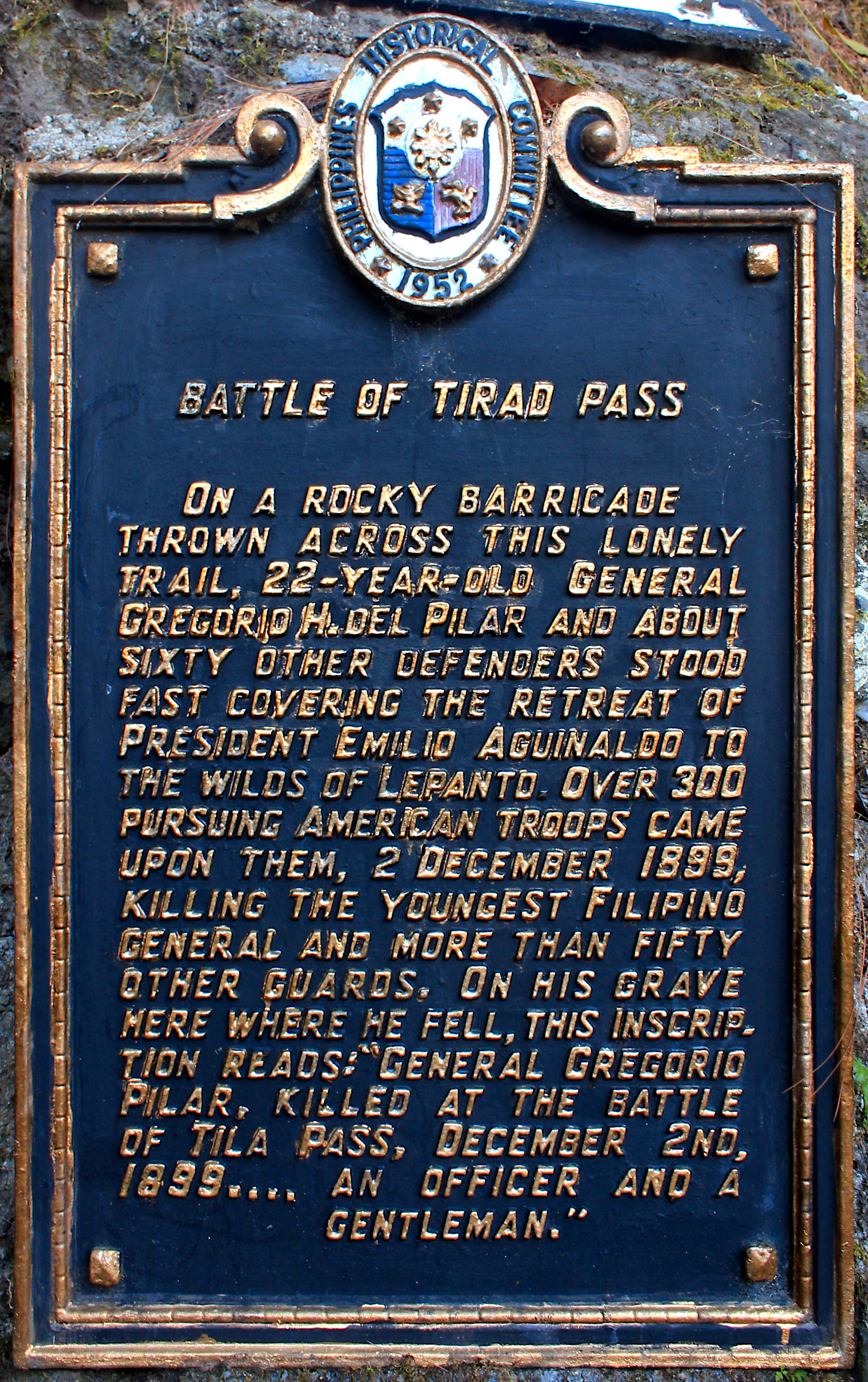
National historical marker installed at the battle site in 1952
