= Januario Galut =

Philippine historical figure (fl. 1899)

Januario Galut (fl. 1899) was a Tingguian Igorot who guided the 33rd Infantry Regiment of United States Volunteers under Major Peyton March so that they could surround and defeat 60 Filipinos led by General Gregorio del Pilar in the Battle of Tirad Pass on December 2, 1899.

After the war between Americans and Filipinos broke out, the Igorot - mountain inhabitants from the Cordilleras of northern Luzon - sent a contingent of their men to fight the Americans at Caloocan. Armed only with spears, axes, and shields, they decided not to fight against Americans with rifles and artillery. The group soon fell out of the Philippine Army and allied with the Americans, acting as guides for the American troops in the highlands of northern Luzon.

Galut has been considered a traitor among Filipinos. The Igorot people, of which Galut was one, were also subjected to much discrimination by lowlanders as to why they sided against the revolutionary government.

The only documentation linking him to the above action is in the testimony of the U.S. Texas Regiment which participated in the battle.

Galut's father may have been an American soldier.
