= Felipe Salvador =

Filipino revolutionary (1870–1912)

Felipe "Apo Ipe" Salvador
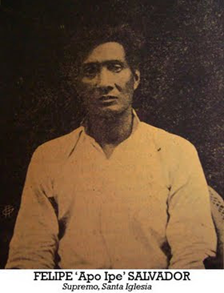
- An image of Felipe "Apo Ipe" Salvador which was known for Supremo of Santa Iglesia

Personal Details

Felipe Salvador (26 May 1870 at Baliuag, Bulacan – 15 April 1912), also known as Apo Ipe or Ápûng Ipê Salvador, was a Filipino revolutionary who founded the Santa Iglesia (Holy Church), a messianic society that was categorized as "colorum" which had the aim of defeating and overthrowing the occupational government of the United States in the Philippines. Salvador joined the Katipunan in 1896 upon the arrival of the Katipuneros from Balintawak in Baliwag, Bulacan. He founded the Santa Iglesia in 1901 after fleeing to the mountains when Gen. Emilio Aguinaldo was captured by American troops. Salvador and his church gained a significant number of followers in the regions of Bulacan, Pampanga, Pangasinan, Tarlac and Nueva Ecija. He was captured by American forces in 1910. He was tried and sentenced to death, being hanged in 1912, two years after his capture.

Felipe Salvador and the Santa Iglesia movement are often depicted as part of Filipino history when numerous resistance and millenarian movements broke out across the archipelago, during a period spanning the Filipino struggle for independence culminating in the Philippine Revolution of 1896 against Spanish rule, to the Philippine–American War of 1899-1902 and its aftermath.

== Early life ==
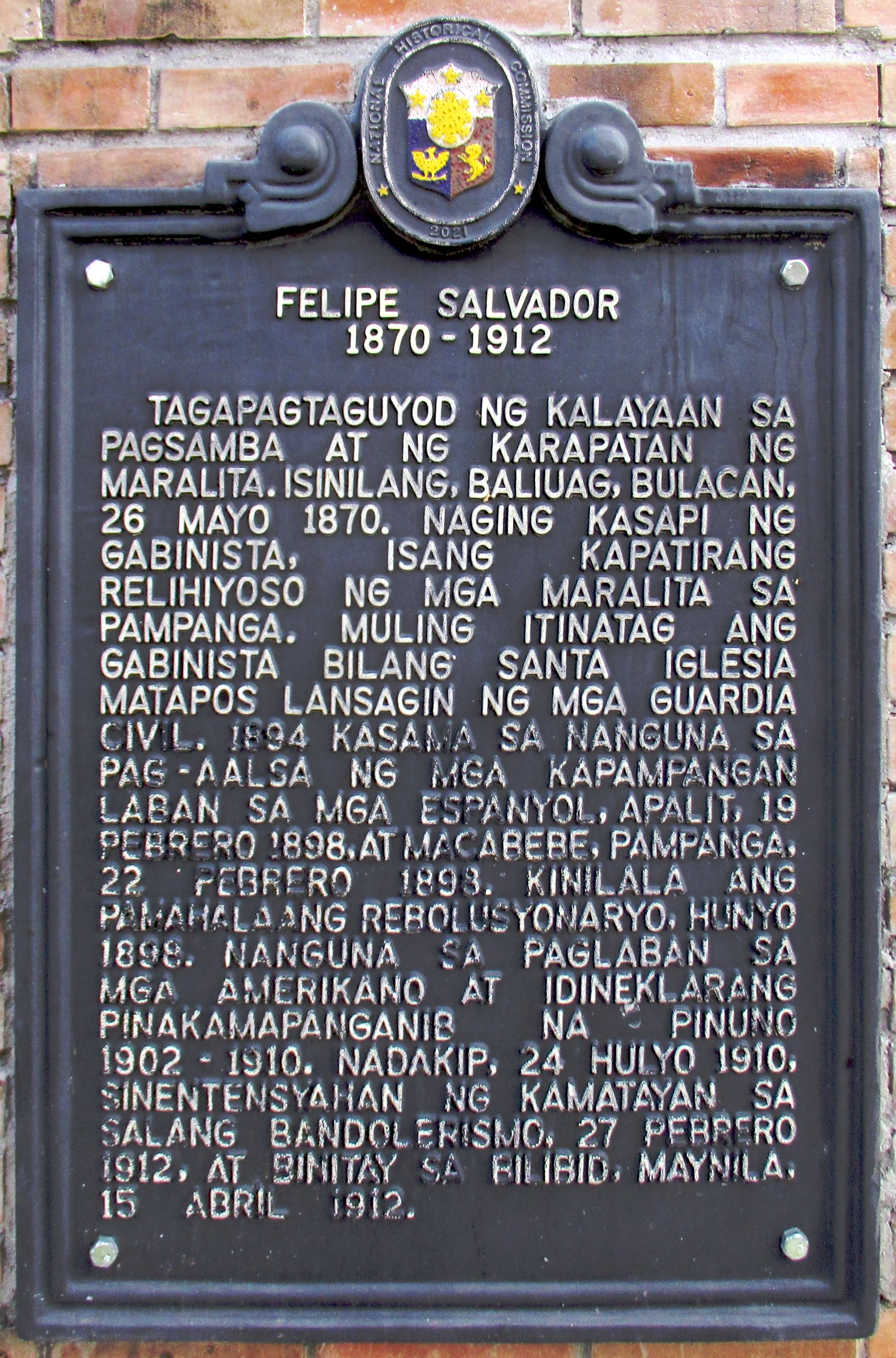
National historical marker for Salvador installed in Baliwag in 2021

Often described by historians as a quasi-religious rebel leader, Felipe Salvador—also known as Apo Ipe—was born in Baliwag, in Bulacan province on the island of Luzon, on May 26, 1870. He was reportedly the son of a Spanish friar and became at one time a Cabeza de barangay in his town, while showing signs of a rebellious character early in life against the Guardia Civil and the parish priest.

== Joining the Katipunan ==
Salvador joined the Katipuneros—members of the Katipunan, the nationalistic, partisan society founded in the Philippines in 1892 to oust the Spanish colonial government—when they arrived in Baliwag from Balintawak. He fought with the Katipunan forces against the US Army in encounters in San Luis, Pampanga, where he was wounded, and subsequently was appointed colonel in 1899 by Emilio Aguinaldo When Aguinaldo was captured by the US forces in March 23, 1901, Salvador went to the mountains and began conducting independent guerrilla operations.

== Rise of Santa Iglesia ==
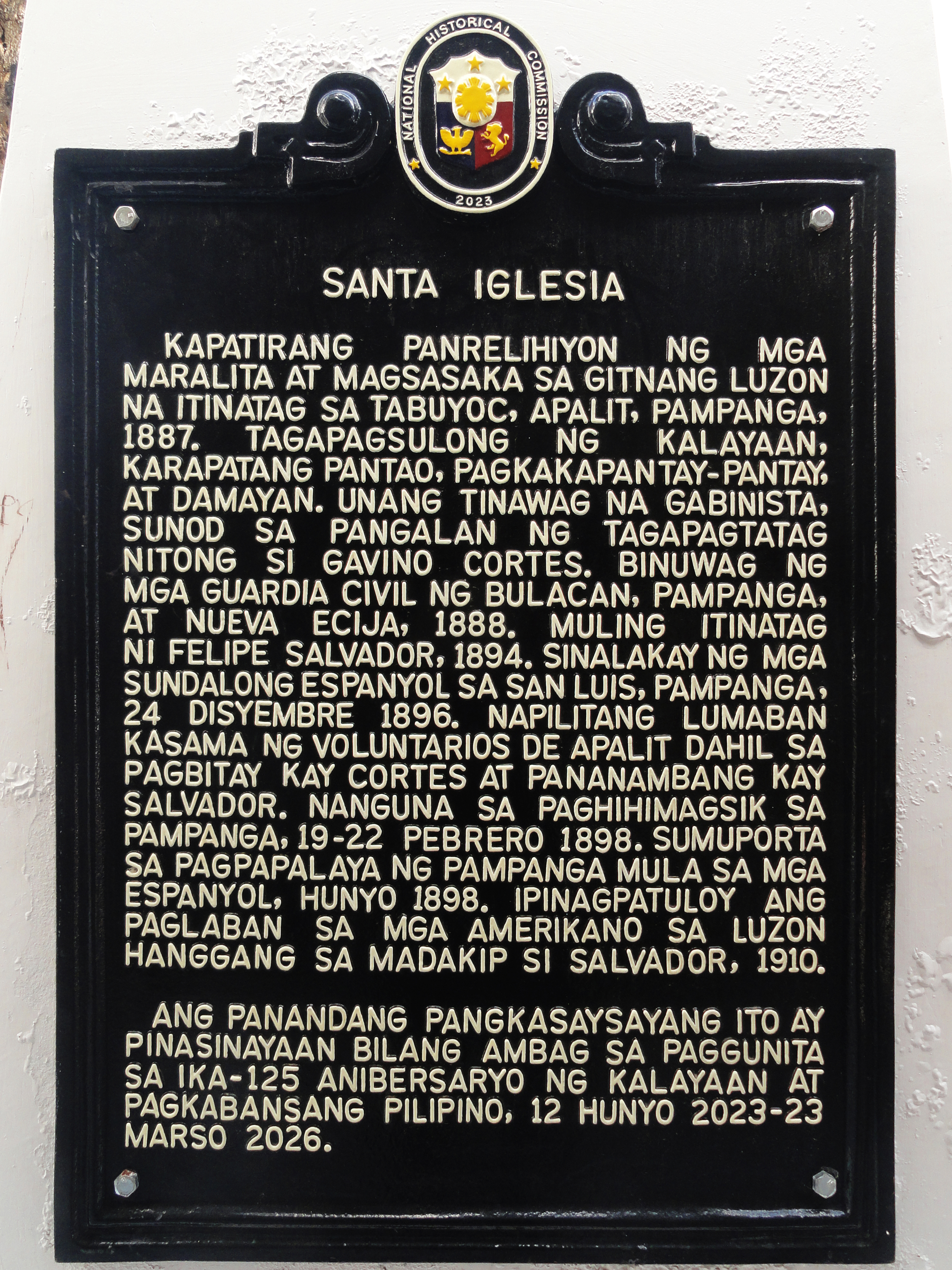
Santa Iglesia NHCP historical markers

The religious sect he organized, called Santa Iglesia or Holy Church, borrowed much of its organization and terminology from the Catholic Church, although the creed of the Santa Iglesia had strongly anti-Spanish, anti-Catholic overtones. Assuming the title of pontiff, Salvador gave away or sold crucifixes and rosaries to his followers and officiated at religious rites similar to those of the Catholic Church. He affected long hair and wore clothes associated with Biblical figures, and was reverently regarded by his followers as a prophet. He warned of the coming of a second "great flood" that would destroy all non-believers, and spoke of a rain of gold and jewels for his followers afterwards. He also promised them God would turn their bolo knives into rifles if they fought bravely and were faithful to Santa Iglesia.

Salvador also promised the barrio people ownership of land when the government was overthrown, and earned their faith and respect. He would enter a town with a group of long-haired and long-robed followers, plant a bamboo cross in the middle of the plaza and launch an eloquent exhortation that would lead many to join his movement. During those years he gained many adherents among the poor and landless masses of Bulacan, Pampanga, Tarlac, Pangasinan and Nueva Ecija.

Salvador's headquarters was located on Mount Arayat, and from there he directed the operations of his men. His top lieutenant, Gen. Manuel Garcia—alias Capt. Tui—usually led the raids on the military outposts; during lulls in the fighting, Salvador continued to recruit large numbers of followers. His followers, by one estimate, numbered over 2,000. By May 1906 Salvador was commanding an army of 300 men and 100 rifles.

Telling the story of Salvador in "The Philippines: A Past Revisited", Constantino said that the people's support for Salvador was so steadfast that the government found it difficult to obtain information on his movements—not even a promised reward of P2,000 for his capture could elicit any information from the people, and whenever he and his followers raided military detachments, a large number of peasants would voluntarily supply them fighting men. In 1902 the Philippine Constabulary captured him in Pampanga and the courts convicted him of sedition but he managed to escape from prison and returned to Central Luzon.

== Capture and death ==
In July 1906 Capt. Tui was killed in an encounter in Hagonoy, which greatly demoralized the Santa Iglesia fighting forces.

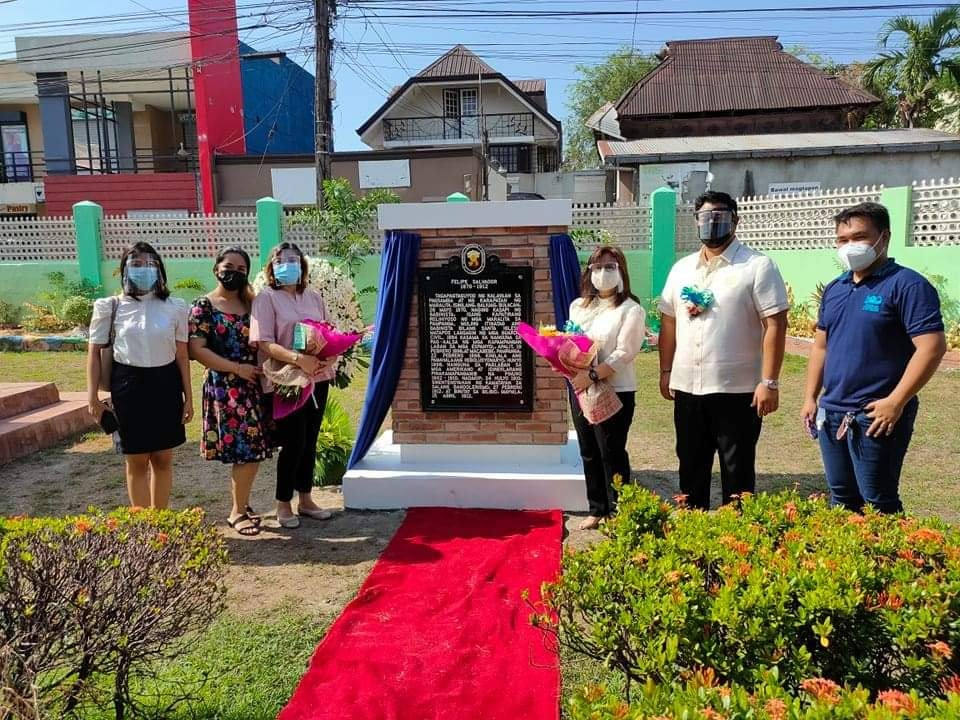
May 26, 2021 unveiling of Salvador marker

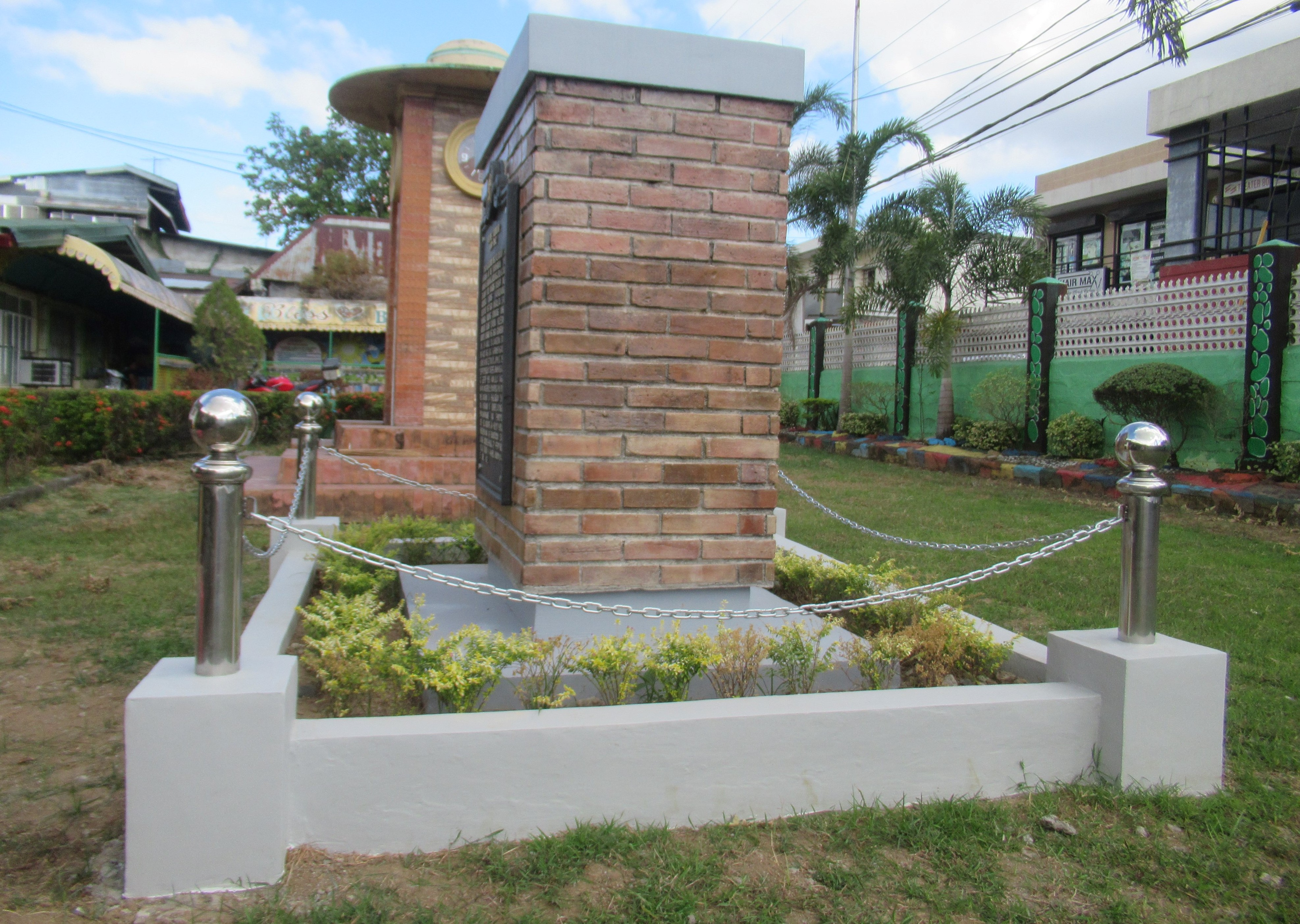
Salvador NHCP marker in 2024

Salvador continued to evade capture for four years, moving from place to place protected by people who continued to believe in him. He was finally captured on July 24, 1910, in San Luis in a remote barrio in the Candaba Swamp, and was prosecuted and sentenced to death on April 15, 1912, in Manila. Newspaper reports of the time described his composure upon his execution, counselling his followers not to grieve.

Salvador's regarded him as divine or semi-divine. Even after his death a cult of Apo Ipe emerged and remained way into the 1920s, and millenarian leaders in Tarlac could still attract many followers by claiming they had eaten or talked with Felipe Salvador.

On May 26, 2021 the National Historical Commission of the Philippines Deputy Executive Director Carminda Arevalo, with Governor Daniel Fernando and Baliwag Mayor Ferdinand Estrella unveiled a Level II Historical-biographical marker at the Baliwag North Central School in synchronous to Salvador's 151st Birth Anniversary.
