= 2022 Quezon City local elections =

19th Mayoral elections in Quezon City

- May 9, 2022
- Turnout: 81.1% ▲12.84 pp
- Mayoral election
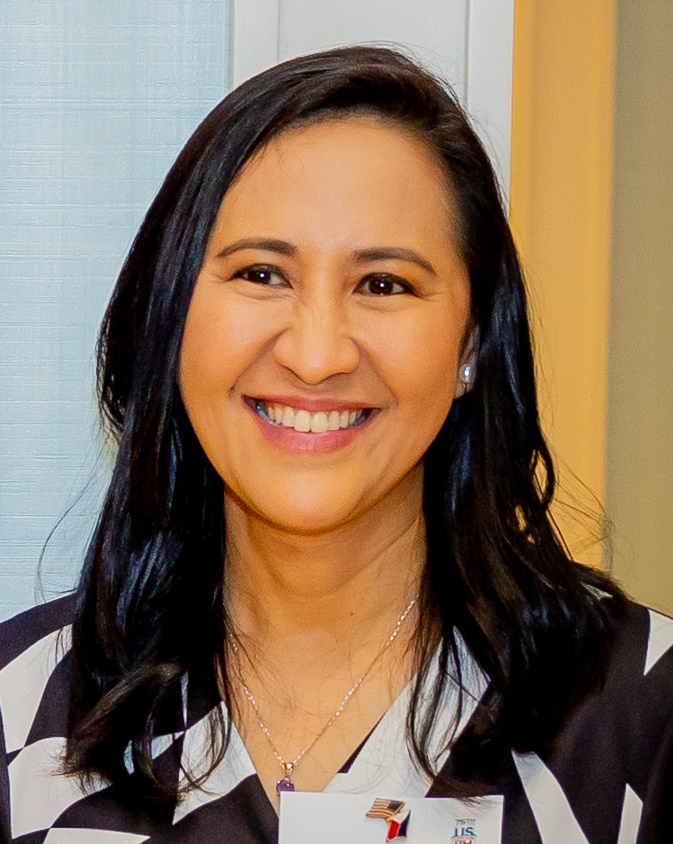

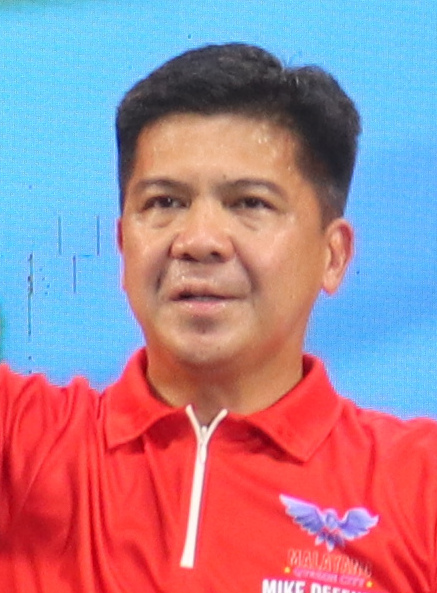
Candidate	Joy Belmonte	Mike Defensor
Party	SBP	PFP
Alliance	Serbisyo sa Bayan	Malayang Quezon City
Running mate	Gian Sotto	Winnie Castelo
Popular vote	662,611	419,064
Percentage	60.43%	38.22%
Mayor before election
Joy Belmonte
Hugpong
Elected Mayor
Joy Belmonte
SBP
- Vice mayoral election
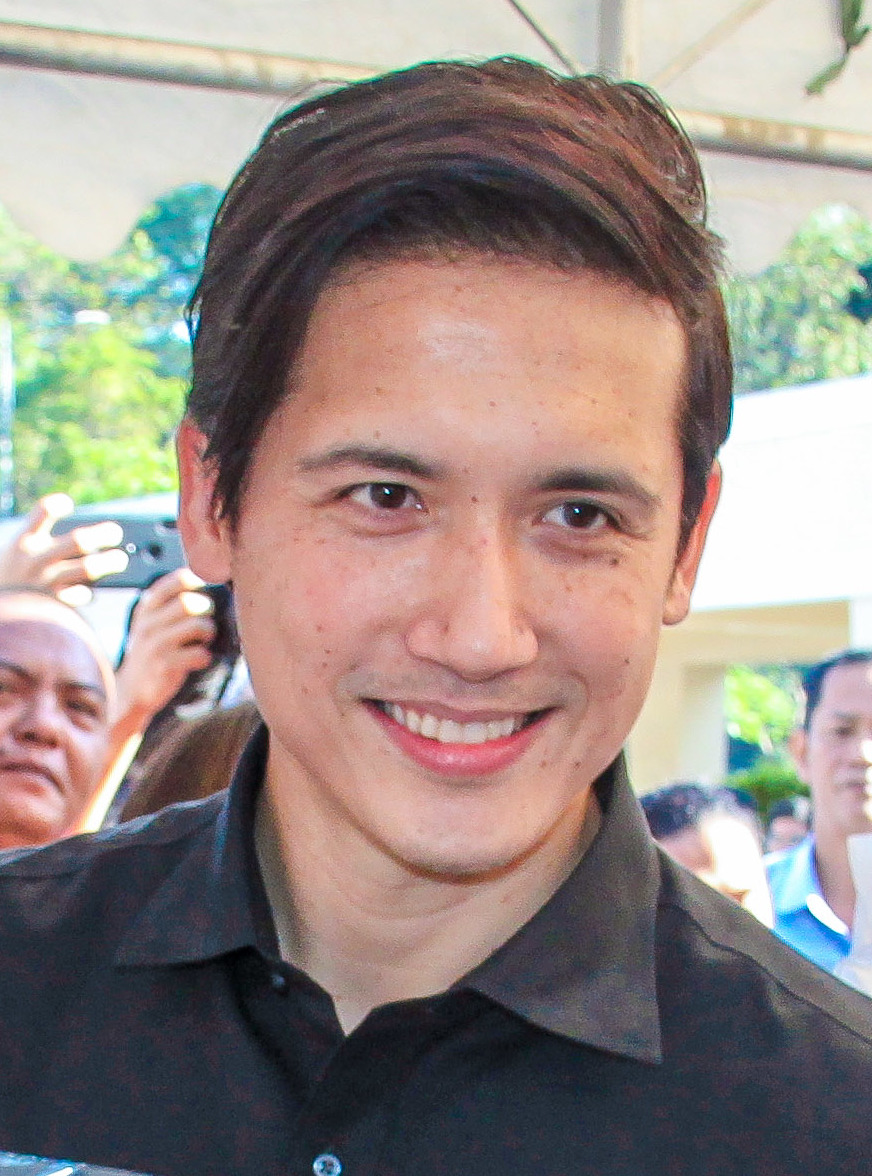

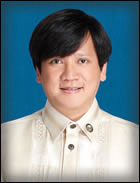
Candidate	Gian Sotto	Winnie Castelo
Party	SBP	Lakas
Alliance	Serbisyo sa Bayan	Malayang Quezon City
Popular vote	594,170	436,212
Percentage	56.51	41.48
Vice Mayor before election
Gian Sotto
SBP
Elected Vice Mayor
Gian Sotto
SBP
- City Council election

36 of 38 seats in the Quezon City Council 20 seats needed for a majority
	First party	Second party	Third party
Party	SBP	Lakas	Nacionalista
Alliance	Serbisyo sa Bayan Party	Malayang Quezon City	Serbisyo sa Bayan Party
Seats won	25	5	2
Popular vote	2,976,936	248,432	120,784
Percentage	54.18%	21.74%	2.20%
	Fourth party	Fifth party	Sixth party
Party	PDP–Laban	Nacionalista	NPC
Alliance	Serbisyo sa Bayan Party	AM	Malayang Quezon City
Seats won	1	1	1
Popular vote	138,673	95,621	70,051
Percentage	2.52%	1.74%	1.27%
	Seventh party
Party	FRPAMM
Seats won	1
Popular vote	70,758
Percentage	1.29%

Local elections were held at Quezon City on May 9, 2022, as part of the Philippine general election. Held concurrently with the national elections, the electorate voted to elect a mayor, a vice mayor, thirty-six city council members and six district representatives to congress. Those elected took their respective offices on June 30, 2022, for a three-year-long term. 1,138,511 of 1,403,895 registered voters voted in this election.

Joy Belmonte and Gian Sotto were re-elected to the mayoralty and vice mayoralty respectively. The Serbisyo sa Bayan Party with its coalition with PDP-Laban and the Nacionalista Party won a combined 28 seats in the city council, effectively securing the coalition an outright majority in the legislative body. Meanwhile, the UniTeam backed opposition coalition, Malayang Quezon City won 6 seats in the city council.

Arjo Atayde, Ralph Tulfo, Franz Pumaren, Marvin Rillo, PM Vargas and Marivic Co-Pilar were elected to represent the city's first, second, third, fourth, fifth and sixth legislative districts respectively in the 19th Congress.

== Background ==
Incumbent Mayor Joy Belmonte is running for her second term against Anakalugusan party-list representative Mike Defensor.

Vice Mayor Gian Sotto is running for his second term against incumbent second district Councilor Winnie Castelo.

In the congressional race, four incumbent representatives, Anthony Peter Crisologo, Precious Hipolito-Castelo, Allan Benedict Reyes and Bong Suntay are running for reelection in the 1st, 2nd, 3rd and 4th districts respectively. 5th District Representative Alfred Vargas and 6th District Representative Kit Belmonte are term-limited.

== Tickets ==
=== Administration coalition ===
Serbisyo sa Bayan Party
#	Name	Party
For Mayor
3.	Joy Belmonte	SBP
For Vice Mayor
4.	Gian Sotto	SBP
For House Of Representatives (1st District)
1.	Arjo Atayde	Independent
For House Of Representatives (2nd District)
6.	Ralph Tulfo	Independent
For House Of Representatives (3rd District)
3.	Franz Pumaren	NUP
For House Of Representatives (4th District)
2.	Bong Suntay	PDP–Laban
For House Of Representatives (5th District)
7.	Patrick Michael Vargas	PDP–Laban
For House Of Representatives (6th District)
1.	Marivic Co-Pilar	NUP
For Councilor (1st District)
3.	TJ Calalay	SBP
9.	Doray Delarmente	SBP
10.	Charm Ferrer	SBP
11.	Bernard Herrera	SBP
12.	Joseph Emile Juico	SBP
For Councilor (2nd District)
1.	Mike Belmonte	SBP
9.	Godie Liban	SBP
11.	Rannie Ludovica	SBP
13.	Aly Medalla	SBP
14.	Candy Medina	SBP
24.	Dave Valmocina	SBP
For Councilor (3rd District)
1.	Chuckie Antonio	SBP
2.	Jorge Banal	SBP
5.	Kate Coseteng	SBP
7.	Don De Leon	Nacionalista
12.	Wency Lagumbay	Nacionalista
17.	Robert Neil Pacheco	SBP
For Councilor (4th District)
4.	Hero Bautista	SBP
5.	Irene Belmonte	SBP
12.	Ivy Xenia Lagman	SBP
15.	Janet Babes Malaya	SBP
18.	Marra Suntay	SBP
19.	Egay Yap	SBP
For Councilor (5th District)
8.	Shaira Liban	SBP
9.	Ram Medalla	SBP
13.	Jose Arnel Quebal	SBP
14.	Alfredo Roxas	SBP
16.	Alfred Vargas	PDP–Laban
17.	Joseph Visaya	SBP
For Councilor (6th District)
3.	Victor Bernardo	SBP
10.	Vito Sotto Generoso	SBP
11.	Ellie Juan	SBP
17.	Kristine Alexia Matias	SBP
19.	Eric Medina	SBP
21.	Banjo Pilar	SBP

=== Primary opposition coalition ===
Malayang Quezon City
#	Name	Party
For Mayor
4.	Mike Defensor	PFP
For Vice Mayor
1.	Winnie Castelo	Lakas
For House Of Representatives (1st District)
2.	Onyx Crisologo	Lakas
For House Of Representatives (2nd District)
2.	Precious Castelo	Lakas
For House Of Representatives (3rd District)
4.	Allan Benedict Reyes	NPC
For House Of Representatives (4th District)
1.	Marvin Rillo	Lakas
For House Of Representatives (5th District)
2.	Ate Rose Lin	Lakas
For House Of Representatives (6th District)
2.	Vincent Crisologo	Lakas
For Councilor (1st District)
4.	Loleng Carandang	Lakas
6.	Nikki Crisologo	Lakas
7.	Drid De Castro	Lakas
8.	Jun De Leon	Aksyon
13.	John Nieto	Lakas
16.	Bong Vinzons	Lakas
For Councilor (2nd District)
2.	Winsell Beltran	Lakas
4.	Wenky Dela Rosa	PPP
8.	Atty. Jing Liban	Lakas
10.	Martin Leachon	Lakas
16.	Kurt Castelo Nocum	Lakas
17.	Roderick Paulate	Lakas
For Councilor (3rd District)
9.	John Defensor	Lakas
10.	Supremo Dela Fuente	PDP–Laban
11.	Allan Franza	NPC
19.	Anton Reyes	NPC
For Councilor (4th District)
2.	Bobby Andrews	Lakas
8.	Nanette Castelo-Daza	Lakas
11.	Atty. Ariel Inton	Independent
14.	Raquel Malangen	Lakas
17.	Imee Rillo	Lakas
For Councilor (5th District)
1.	Emil Austriaco	Lakas
3.	Mutya Castelo	Lakas
6.	Toleng Francisco	Lakas
7.	Atty. Ace Jurado	Lakas
12.	Bobby Papin	Lakas
For Councilor (6th District)
4.	Jem Castelo	Lakas
9.	Ali Forbes	Lakas
14.	Jaja Mantele	Lakas
15.	Rikki Mathay	Lakas
20.	Karl Paguio	Lakas
22.	Louie Saludes	Lakas

=== Other coalitions ===
Partido Demokratiko Sosyalista ng Pilipinas coalition
#	Name	Party
For Mayor
2.	Ricardo Bello	PDSP
For Vice Mayor
3.	Helen Rodriguez	PDSP
For Councilor (2nd District)
12.	Charlie Mangune	PDSP
19.	Jimmy Penepona	PDSP
22.	Mario Rillo	PDSP
25.	Beatriz Vargas	PDSP
26.	Kevin Joseph Villaruz	PDSP
For Councilor (3rd District)
8.	Francisco De Leon	PDSP
For Councilor (4th District)
3.	Darwin Aquino	PDSP
For Councilor (6th District)
7.	Joseph Peter Cruz	PDSP
13.	Fairodz Maneged	PDSP
25.	Mark Jhon Vallena	PDSP

Aksyon Demokratiko coalition
#	Name	Party
For Councilor (1st District)
5.	Doland Castro	Aksyon
For Councilor (2nd District)
27.	Melissa Yap	Aksyon
For Councilor (3rd District)
6.	Dante De Guzman	Aksyon
For Councilor (4th District)
10.	James Ibañez	Aksyon
For Councilor (5th District)
5.	Amalia Francisco	Aksyon
11.	Gani Oro	Aksyon

Labor Party Philippines coalition
#	Name	Party
For Mayor
5.	Jose Ingles Jr.	WPP
For Councilor (3rd District)
15.	Resurreccion Manuel	WPP

Kilusang Bagong Lipunan coalition
#	Name	Party
For Councilor (2nd District)
6.	Jaime Hombre Jr.	KBL
For Councilor (6th District)
23.	Junipher Sumadia	KBL

Reform PH - People's Party coalition
#	Name	Party
For Councilor (4th District)
16.	Allan Parreño	RP
For Councilor (6th District)
6.	Alvin Constantino	RP

PDP–Laban coalition
#	Name	Party
For Councilor (3rd District)
3.	Jaime Borres	PDP–Laban

== Opinion polling ==
Fieldwork Date(s)	Pollster	Sample Size	MoE	Bello PDSP	Belmonte SBP	Defensor PFP	Ingles WPP	Undecided/None
Apr. 25–28	Publicus Asia	1,625	±3.00%	1%	51%	22%	1%	25%
Apr. 8–13	Publicus Asia	1,625	±3.00%	2%	48%	26%	1%	23%
March 25	Start of Campaign Period for Local Candidates							
Mar. 16-21	Publicus Asia	1,648	±10.00%	5%	57%	40%	1%	
Jan. 22–30	RPMDinc	—	—	—	65%	32%	—	3%
Jan. 10–16	I&AC	—	—	—	39%	53%	—	8%
2022
Nov. 16–24	RPMDinc	—	—	—	62%	30%	—	8%
Oct. 17–26	RPMDinc	—	—	—	60%	35%	—	5%

== Mayoral election ==
The incumbent mayor is Joy Belmonte, who was elected in 2019 with 54.09% of the vote. She ran for re-election to a second term under the Serbisyo sa Bayan Party.

Belmonte faced a challenge from eight other candidates; including representative Mike Defensor of the Malayang Quezon City coalition. Defensor was endorsed by UniTeam senatorial candidate Herbert Bautista and presidential candidate Bongbong Marcos, despite that the former was his rival for his first run as a mayor last 2010 and Belmonte was her running mate.

=== Candidates ===
- Glenda Araneta (Independent)
- Ricardo Bello (PDSP)
- Joy Belmonte (SBP), Incumbent mayor (2019–present)
- Mike Defensor (PFP), Representative for Anakalusugan Party-list (2019–2022)
- Jose Ingles Jr. (WPP)
- Rolando Jota (Independent)
- Wilhelmina Orozco (Independent)
- Tomas Salutan Jr. (Independent)
- Diosdado Velasco (Independent)

=== Results ===
Belmonte handily defeated Defensor, winning with a greater margin compared with her neophyte campaign.

Candidate	Party	Votes	%
Joy Belmonte	Serbisyo sa Bayan Party	662,611	60.43
Mike Defensor	Partido Federal ng Pilipinas	419,064	38.22
Glenda Araneta	Independent	4,282	0.39
Diosdado Velasco	Independent	2,981	0.27
Ricardo Bello	Partido Demokratiko Sosyalista ng Pilipinas	2,642	0.24
Wilhelmina Orozco	Independent	1,899	0.17
Jose Ingles Jr.	Labor Party Philippines	1,238	0.11
Tomas Salutan Jr.	Independent	975	0.09
Rolando Jota	Independent	853	0.08
Total		1,096,545	100.00

== Vice mayoral election ==
Incumbent Gian Sotto is running for his second term, facing his distant relative, former 2nd district representative and councilor Winnie Castelo and two other candidates.

Candidate	Party	Votes	%
Gian Sotto	Serbisyo sa Bayan Party	594,170	56.51
Winnie Castelo	Lakas–CMD	436,212	41.48
Christine Laraño	Independent	14,679	1.40
Helen Rodriguez	Partido Demokratiko Sosyalista ng Pilipinas	6,451	0.61
Total		1,051,512	100.00

== Congressional elections ==
Party or alliance		Votes	%	Seats
Serbisyo sa Bayan Party	PDP–Laban	186,438	17.44	1
Serbisyo sa Bayan Party	National Unity Party	163,721	15.31	2
Serbisyo sa Bayan Party	Independent	239,695	22.42	2
Serbisyo sa Bayan Party	Total	575,144	53.79	5
Malayang Quezon City	Lakas–CMD	362,419	33.90	1
Malayang Quezon City	Nationalist People's Coalition	60,038	5.62	0
Malayang Quezon City	Total	422,457	39.51	1
Partido Federal ng Pilipinas		14,760	1.38	0
PDP–Laban		10,415	0.97	0
Independent		31,684	2.96	0
Total		1,069,170	100.00	6

=== 1st District ===
Incumbent Anthony Peter "Onyx" Crisologo was defeated by actor Arjo Atayde in his reelection bid. The third placer was MSME entrepreneur Marcus Aurelius Dee.

Among the three running, Crisologo (has lived in Heroes Hills, Brgy. Santa Cruz his whole life) and Dee of Del Monte are the only natives of District 1.

2022 Philippine House of Representatives election in the 1st District of Quezon City
Party	Candidate	Votes	%
Independent	Juan Carlos "Arjo" Atayde	112,457	66.85
Lakas	Anthony Peter "Onyx" Crisologo	52,910	31.45
Independent	Marcus Aurelius "Makinig sa Distrito" Dee	2,857	1.70
Total votes		168,224	100.00
Independent gain from Lakas			

=== 2nd District ===
Another Lakas-CMD-affiliated incumbent, Precious Castelo, lost in her reelection bid at the hands of independent Ralph Tulfo, son of broadcaster and Senator Raffy Tulfo. Four other independents also ran.

2022 Philippine House of Representatives election in the 2nd District of Quezon City
Party	Candidate	Votes	%
Independent	Ralph Tulfo	127,238	53.81
Lakas	Mari Grace "Precious" Hipolito-Castelo	96,565	40.84
Independent	Virgilio "Atty. Virgil" Garcia	6,231	2.63
Independent	Diosdado Calonge	3,533	1.49
Independent	Henric David	1,806	0.76
Independent	Raul Gador	1,103	0.47
Total votes		236,476	100.00
Independent gain from Lakas			

=== 3rd District ===
Incumbent Allan Benedict Reyes lost his seat to his former ally, incumbent councilor Franz Pumaren. The third placer was independent candidate Jessie Dignadice.

2022 Philippine House of Representatives election in the 3rd District of Quezon City
Party	Candidate	Votes	%
NUP	Franz Pumaren	64,177	50.68
NPC	Allan Benedict Reyes	60,038	47.41
Independent	Jessie Dignadice	2,419	1.91
Total votes		126,634	100.00
NUP gain from NPC			

=== 4th District ===
Incumbent Bong Suntay was running for reelection against former councilor Marvin Rillo. Rillo defeated Suntay in a close race with a 1.18% difference of 1,948 votes.

It was the only congressional race won by Lakas–CMD in Quezon City in this election. (The former lost its reelection bids in the first two districts, both at the hands of independent candidates.)

2022 Philippine House of Representatives election in the 4th District of Quezon City
Party	Candidate	Votes	%
Lakas	Marvin Rillo	83,517	50.59
PDP–Laban	Jesus "Bong" Suntay	81,569	49.41
Total votes		165,086	100.00
Lakas gain from PDP–Laban			

=== 5th District ===
Alfred Vargas is on his third term as representative and is barred to seek reelection. Instead, he ran for councilor in the same district. His party nominated his brother, incumbent councilor PM Vargas.

PM Vargas won the seat against six other candidates, including the second placer, businesswoman Rose Lin; former 2nd District representative Mary Ann Susano; and four independent candidates. Lin was originally nominated by Lakas–CMD but she later resigned from the party on November 19, 2021 after her name was embroiled in the Pharmally Pharmaceutical scandal. (Her husband, Allan Lin Weixiong, was the financial manager of Pharmally.)

2022 Philippine House of Representatives election in the 5th District of Quezon City
Party	Candidate	Votes	%
PDP–Laban	Patrick Michael "PM" Vargas	104,869	50.69
Lakas	Rose "Ate Rose" Nono-Lin	73,508	35.53
PFP	Mary Ann "Annie" Susano	14,760	7.13
Independent	Catherine "Manang Inday" Esplana	8,557	4.14
Independent	Antonio Ortega	2,803	1.35
Independent	Rose Lynn Sanchez	1,901	0.92
Independent	Angel Rustia Jr.	474	0.23
Total votes		206,872	100.00
PDP–Laban hold			

=== 6th District ===
Incumbent Kit Belmonte, a Liberal Party member and a close relative of Mayor Joy Belmonte, is on his final term as representative and is barred to seek reelection.

Running for the vacant position were former representatives Bingbong Crisologo and Tricia Nicole Velasco-Catera of Ang Mata'y Alagaan (MATA) partylist, and incumbent councilor Marivic Co-Pilar, an ally of Joy Belmonte. Co-Pilar won the election after getting 60% of votes cast.

2022 Philippine House of Representatives election in the 6th District of Quezon City
Party	Candidate	Votes	%
NUP	Marivic Co-Pilar	99,544	60.01
Lakas	Vincent "Bingbong" Crisologo	55,919	33.71
PDP–Laban	Tricia Nicole Velasco-Catera	10,415	6.28
Total votes		165,878	100.00
NUP gain from Liberal			

== City council elections ==
Party or alliance		Votes	%	Seats
Serbisyo sa Bayan Party	Serbisyo sa Bayan Party	2,976,936	54.18	25
Serbisyo sa Bayan Party	PDP–Laban	138,673	2.52	1
Serbisyo sa Bayan Party	Nacionalista Party	120,784	2.20	2
Serbisyo sa Bayan Party	Total	3,236,393	58.91	28
Malayang Quezon City	Lakas–CMD	1,194,257	21.74	5
Malayang Quezon City	Nationalist People's Coalition	70,051	1.27	1
Malayang Quezon City	Partido Pilipino sa Pagbabago	59,839	1.09	0
Malayang Quezon City	PDP–Laban	36,933	0.67	0
Malayang Quezon City	Aksyon Demokratiko	19,339	0.35	0
Malayang Quezon City	Independent	69,495	1.26	0
Malayang Quezon City	Total	1,449,914	26.39	6
Aksyon Demokratiko		154,061	2.80	0
Nacionalista Party		95,621	1.74	1
Filipino Rights Protection Advocates of Manila Movement		70,758	1.29	1
Partido para sa Demokratikong Reporma		52,140	0.95	0
Partido Demokratiko Sosyalista ng Pilipinas		44,769	0.81	0
Reform PH - People's Party		34,138	0.62	0
Pwersa ng Masang Pilipino		11,003	0.20	0
Partido Federal ng Pilipinas		10,816	0.20	0
PDP–Laban		8,351	0.15	0
Malayang Quezon City		7,870	0.14	0
Katipunan ng Nagkakaisang Pilipino		6,544	0.12	0
Maharlika People's Party		5,251	0.10	0
Kilusang Bagong Lipunan		5,181	0.09	0
People's Reform Party		1,606	0.03	0
Independent		299,819	5.46	0
Ex-officio seats				2
Total		5,494,235	100.00	38

=== 1st District ===
Quezon City Council election at the 1st district
Party	Candidate	Votes	%
SBP	Bernard Herrera (incumbent)	120,831	14.59
SBP	TJ Calalay (incumbent)	117,952	14.24
SBP	Doray Delarmente (incumbent)	116,018	14.01
SBP	Joseph Emile Juico	103,377	12.48
Lakas	Nikki Crisologo (incumbent)	93,920	11.34
SBP	Charm Ferrer	91,364	11.03
Aksyon	Doland Castro	57,596	6.95
Lakas	Juanito Nieto	22,126	2.67
Aksyon	Leonardo De Leon Jr.	19,339	2.33
Lakas	Eldridge De Castro	18,892	2.28
Lakas	Bong Vinzons	17,643	2.13
Lakas	Lorraine Carandang	17,344	2.09
Independent	Emil Padilla	11,530	1.39
Independent	Benjamin Aromin Jr.	8,615	1.04
KANP	Charles Cahilig	6,544	0.79
MPP	Lamheto Tebio	5,251	0.63
Total votes		828,342	100.00

=== 2nd District ===
Quezon City Council election at the 2nd district
Party	Candidate	Votes	%
SBP	Mike Belmonte (incumbent)	150,770	
SBP	Candy Medina (incumbent)	149,913	
SBP	Aly Medalla	124,834	
SBP	Dave Valmocina	120,808	
SBP	Rannie Ludovica	109,741	
SBP	Godie Liban	105,980	
Lakas	Roderick Paulate	70,445	
Lakas	Martin Leachon	61,429	
Lakas	Kurt Joseph Nocum	60,108	
PPP	Wenky Dela Rosa	59,839	
Lakas	Joan Liban	52,214	
Lakas	Winsell Beltran-Cordora	38,431	
Independent	Victor Pring	36,676	
Independent	Joseph Cerezo	20,006	
Aksyon	Melissa Yap Mendez	15,335	
PDSP	Charlie Mangune	12,450	
PFP	Emerita Pecson	10,816	
PDSP	Beatriz Vargas	8,962	
Independent	Leo Mendoza	8,264	
Independent	Eddie Garcia	7,350	
Independent	Norberto Rivero	6,713	
Independent	Franz Restie Perez III	6,002	
PDSP	Mario Rillo	4,934	
PDSP	Kevin Joseph Villaruz	3,655	
PDSP	Jimmy Penepona	2,317	
KBL	Jaime Hombre Jr.	2,207	
PRP	Miguel Jotojot	1,606	
Total votes		1,251,805	

=== 3rd District ===
Quezon City Council election at the 3rd district
Party	Candidate	Votes	%
SBP	Kate Coseteng (incumbent)	79,613	
FRONTLINERS	Geleen Lumbad	70,758	
SBP	Chuckie Antonio	68,083	
Nacionalista	Don De Leon	62,120	
Nacionalista	Wency Lagumbay (incumbent)	58,664	
NPC	Anton Reyes	57,590	
SBP	Jorge Banal (incumbent)	49,416	
Independent	Christopher Allan Liquigan	43,036	
SBP	Robert Neil Pacheco	40,663	
Lakas	John Defensor (incumbent)	37,111	
PDP–Laban	Supremo Dela Fuente	36,933	
Aksyon	Dante De Guzman	17,307	
NPC	Allan Franza	12,461	
PDP–Laban	Jaime Borres	8,351	
Independent	Shaun Terrence Ng	3,154	
Independent	Vincent Papa	3,068	
Independent	Resurreccion Manuel	3,000	
PDSP	Francisco De Mesa	1,855	
MQC	Jeffrey Cea	988	
Total votes		654,171	100.00

=== 4th District ===
Quezon City Council election at the 4th district
Party	Candidate	Votes	%
SBP	Egay Yap	89,424	
Lakas	Imee Rillo (incumbent)	86,514	
Lakas	Raquel Malañgen	85,604	
SBP	Irene Belmonte (incumbent)	82,167	
Lakas	Nanette Castelo-Daza	80,793	
SBP	Marra Suntay (incumbent)	79,029	
SBP	Ivy Xenia Lagman (incumbent)	77,907	
Lakas	Bobby Andrews	69,612	
Independent	Ariel Inton	69,495	
SBP	Janet Babes Malaya	48,821	
SBP	Hero Bautista (incumbent)	48,790	
Independent	Eric Chan	8,563	
Independent	Nestor Andal	6,972	
Independent	Joshua Miguel Cleofe	4,947	
Aksyon	James Ibañez	4,654	
Independent	Yanz Macadaeg	3,490	
PDSP	Darwin Aquino	2,747	
RP	Allan Parreño	2,710	
MQC	Edwardson Guingab	1,286	
Total votes		853,525	100

=== 5th District ===
Quezon City Council election at the 5th district
Party	Candidate	Votes	%
SBP	Joseph Visaya	141,586	
PDP–Laban	Alfred Vargas	138,673	
SBP	Ram Medalla (incumbent)	109,068	
SBP	Shaira Liban (incumbent)	97,678	
Nacionalista	Aiko Melendez	95,621	
Lakas	Mutya Castelo	90,746	
SBP	Jose Arnel Quebal	85,691	
SBP	Alfredo Roxas	82,357	
Reporma	Maureen Botones-Quiñones	52,140	
Aksyon	Amalia Francisco	47,766	
Lakas	Angelito Francisco	30,067	
Lakas	Ace Randolph Jurado	23,518	
Lakas	Bobby Papin	22,189	
Lakas	Emil Austriaco	14,235	
Aksyon	Gani Oro	11,403	
Independent	Walter Alvin Zamora	10,161	
Independent	EJ Delos Reyes	5,224	
Independent	Mark Vincent Schwab	3,722	
Total votes		1,061,845	100

=== 6th District ===
Quezon City Council election at the 6th district
Party	Candidate	Votes	%
SBP	Ellie Juan	92,149	
SBP	Kristine Alexia Matias	90,271	
SBP	Eric Medina (incumbent)	84,683	
SBP	Banjo Pilar	75,668	
SBP	Vito Sotto Generoso	73,646	
SBP	Victor Bernardo	68,638	
Lakas	Junie Marie Castelo	49,099	
Lakas	Rikki Mathay	44,866	
Independent	Elizabeth De Jesus	43,940	
Lakas	Ali Forbes	34,682	
RP	Alvin Constantino	31,428	
Lakas	Luis Saludes	31,127	
Lakas	Jardiya Mantele	23,367	
Independent	Carmela Suva-Cleofe	23,424	
Independent	Boy Matias	19,951	
Lakas	Karl John Paguio	18,175	
PMP	Drew Liban	11,003	
MQC	Danilo Apo	5,596	
Independent	Dinkydoo Clarion	4,646	
Independent	Allah Arceo	3,987	
Independent	Leo Maturan	3,378	
KBL	Junipher Sumadia	2,974	
PDSP	Joseph Peter Cruz	2,795	
PDSP	Carol Maneged	2,749	
PDSP	Mark Jhon Vallena	2,305	
Total votes		844,547	100
