= 2025 Quezon City local elections =

20th Mayoral elections in Quezon City

- May 12, 2025
- Mayoral election
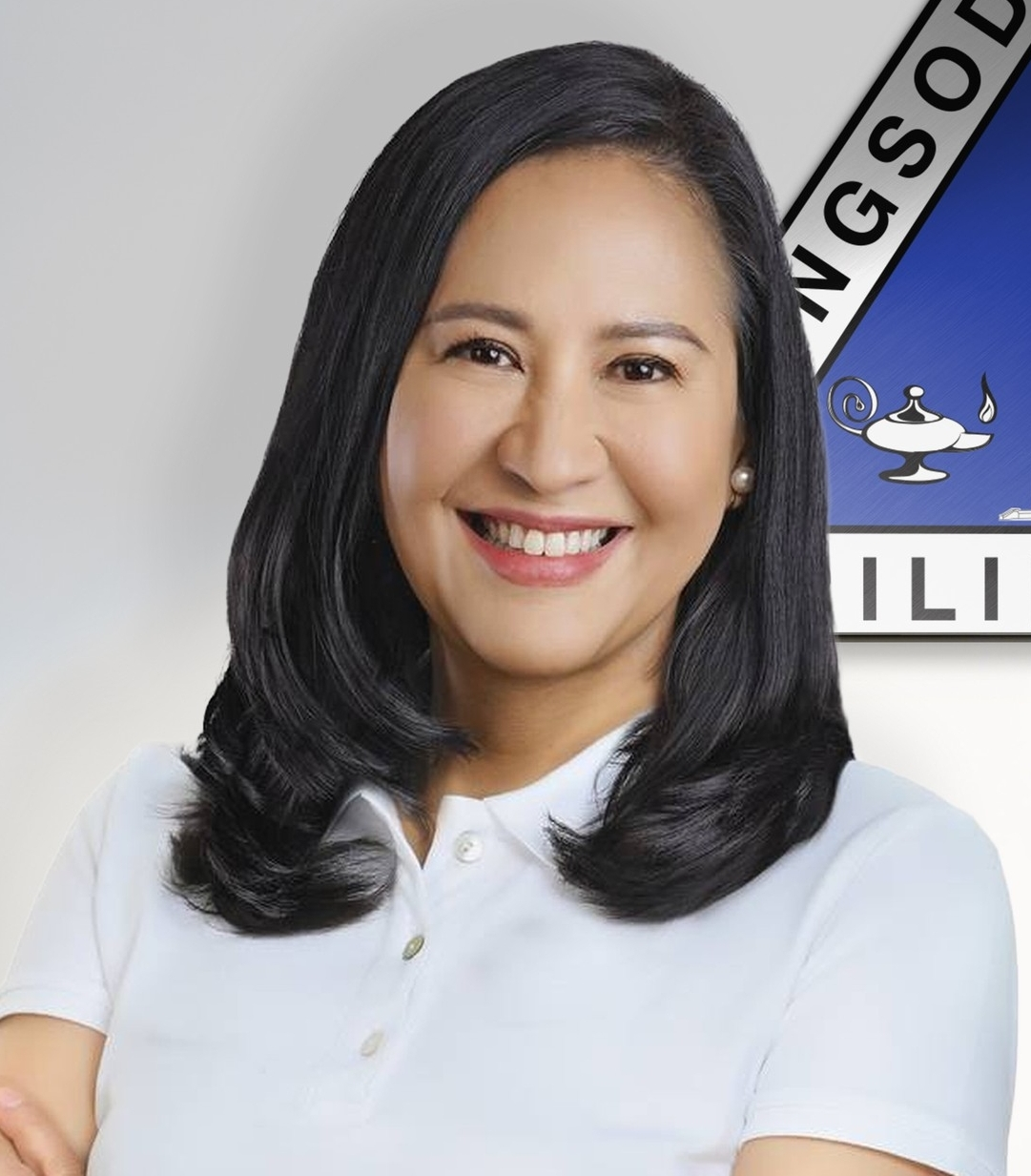
		IND
Candidate	Joy Belmonte	Diosdado Velasco
Party	SBP	Independent
Alliance	Serbisyo sa Bayan
Running mate	Gian Sotto
Popular vote	1,030,730	21,195
Percentage	95.96	1.97
Mayor before election
Joy Belmonte
SBP
Elected Mayor
Joy Belmonte
SBP
- Vice mayoral election
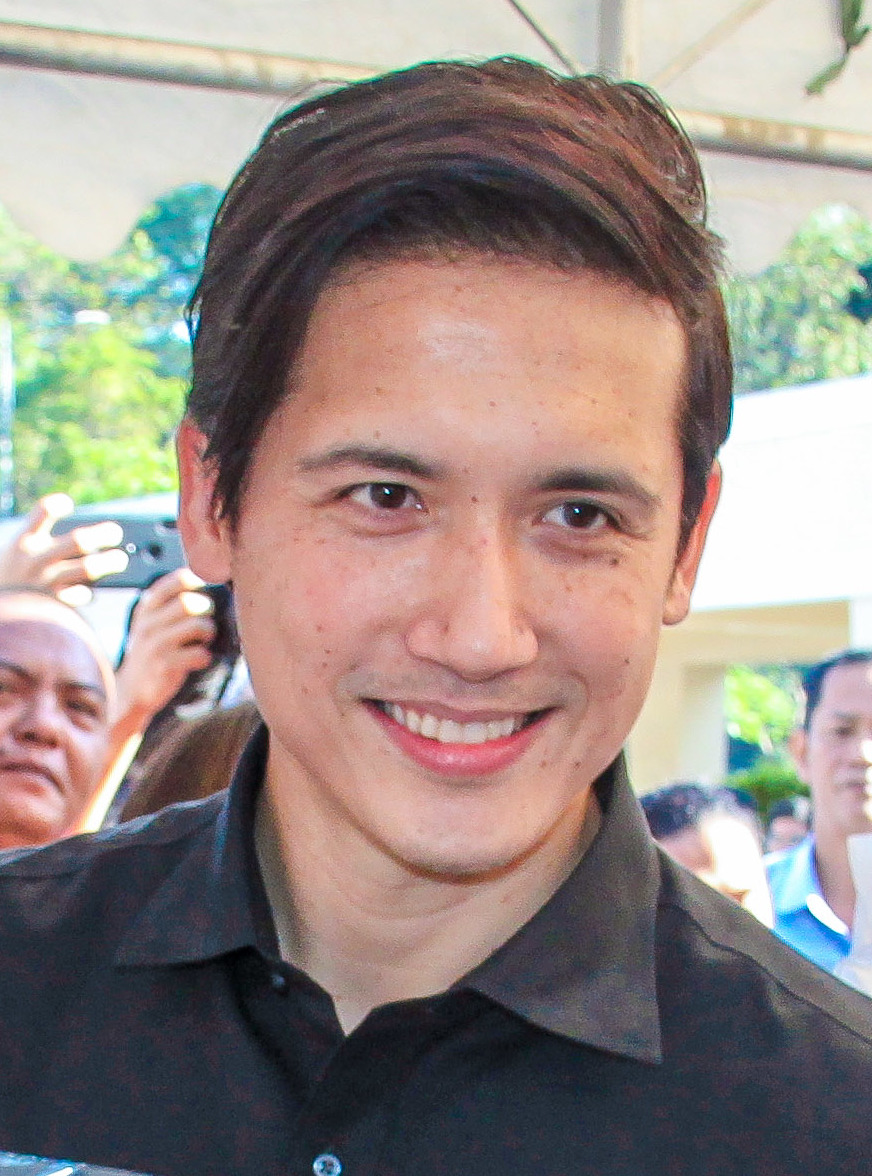
		IND
Candidate	Gian Sotto	Dante Villarta
Party	SBP	Independent
Popular vote	938,686	27,077
Percentage	93.48	2.70
Vice Mayor before election
Gian Sotto
SBP
Elected Vice Mayor
Gian Sotto
SBP
- City Council election

36 of 38 seats in the Quezon City Council 20 seats needed for a majority
	First party	Second party	Third party
Party	SBP	Lakas	Independent
Alliance	SBP
Last election	25 seats, 69.44%	5 seats, 13.88%	1 seat, 2.77%
Seats before	29	4	1
Seats won	28	3	2
Seat change	▼1	▼1	▲1
	Fourth party	Fifth party	Sixth party
Party	Nacionalista	PFP	Aksyon
Last election	2 seats, 5.55%	1 seat, 2.77%	Did not participate
Seats before	1	1	0
Seats won	1	1	1
Seat change	1	1	▲1

Local elections are scheduled to be held in Quezon City on May 12, 2025, as part of the 2025 Philippine general election. The electorate will elect a mayor, a vice mayor, 36 members of the Quezon City Council, and six district representatives to the House of Representatives of the Philippines. The officials elected in the election will assume their respective offices on June 30, 2025, for a three-year-long term.

== Background ==
In the previous elections, the Serbisyo sa Bayan Party attained a landslide victory, winning 28 out of 36 seats for Quezon City Council, and five out of six seats to the House of Representatives of the Philippines. Incumbents Joy Belmonte and Gian Sotto were elected as mayor and vice mayor respectively.

Incumbent mayor Joy Belmonte is running for her third and final term against independent candidates Jonathan Cabalo, Rolando Jota, Noli Navat, and Diosdado Velasco.

Incumbent vice mayor Gian Sotto is running for his third term against independent candidates June Faelangco, Jose Ingles, and Dante Villarta.

In the congressional race, all six incumbent representatives are running for their second term, Arjo Atayde, Ralph Tulfo, Franz Pumaren, Marvin Rillo, and PM Vargas are running for re-election in the 1st, 2nd, 3rd, 4th, and 5th districts respectively, while Marivic Co-Pilar is running for re-election in the 6th district unopposed.

== Mayoral election ==
Incumbent Joy Belmonte (Serbisyo sa Bayan Party) is running for a third term. Belmonte was re-elected with 60.43% of the vote in 2022.

Candidate	Party	Votes	%
Joy Belmonte (incumbent)	Serbisyo sa Bayan Party	1,030,730	95.56
Diosdado Velasco	Independent	21,195	1.97
Jonathan Cabalo	Independent	13,809	1.28
Rolando Jota	Independent	8,586	0.80
Noli Navat	Independent	4,253	0.39
Total		1,078,573	100.00
Registered voters/turnout		1,454,411	–
Serbisyo sa Bayan Party hold			
Source: Commission on Elections

== Vice mayoral election ==
Incumbent Gian Sotto (Serbisyo sa Bayan Party) is running for a third term. Sotto was re-elected with 56.51% of the vote in 2022.

Candidate	Party	Votes	%
Gian Sotto (incumbent)	Serbisyo sa Bayan Party	938,686	93.48
Dante Villarta	Independent	27,077	2.70
Jose Ingles	Independent	19,821	1.97
June Faelangco	Independent	18,598	1.85
Total		1,004,182	100.00
Registered voters/turnout		1,454,411	–
Serbisyo sa Bayan Party hold			
Source: Commission on Elections

== Congressional elections ==
=== First district ===
Incumbent Arjo Atayde (Nacionalista Party) is running for a second term. He was elected as an independent with 66.85% of the vote in 2022. His opponent is former representative Vincent Crisologo.

Candidate	Party	Votes	%
Arjo Atayde (incumbent)	Nacionalista Party	93,999	58.53
Vincent Crisologo	Partido Federal ng Pilipinas	66,606	41.47
Total		160,605	100.00
Registered voters/turnout		217,676	–
Nacionalista Party hold			
Source: Commission on Elections

=== Second district ===
Incumbent Ralph Tulfo (Partido Federal ng Pilipinas) is running for a second term. He was elected as an independent with 53.81% of the vote in 2022.

Candidate	Party	Votes	%
Ralph Tulfo (incumbent)	Partido Federal ng Pilipinas	185,164	81.70
Virgil Garcia	Independent	31,412	13.86
Francisco Palma	Independent	6,432	2.84
Roel Bernido	Independent	3,638	1.61
Total		226,646	100.00
Registered voters/turnout		328,316	–
Partido Federal ng Pilipinas hold			
Source: Commission on Elections

=== Third district ===
Incumbent Franz Pumaren (National Unity Party) is running for a second term. He was elected with 50.68% of the vote in 2022.

Candidate	Party	Votes	%
Franz Pumaren (incumbent)	National Unity Party	73,946	56.10
Allan Benedict Reyes	Partido Federal ng Pilipinas	57,874	43.90
Total		131,820	100.00
Registered voters/turnout		172,497	–
National Unity Party hold			
Source: Commission on Elections

=== Fourth district ===
Incumbent Marvin Rillo (Lakas–CMD) is running for a second term. He was elected with 50.59% of the vote in 2022.

Candidate	Party	Votes	%
Bong Suntay	United Nationalist Alliance	91,504	50.07
Marvin Rillo (incumbent)	Lakas–CMD	91,243	49.93
Total		182,747	100.00
United Nationalist Alliance gain from Lakas–CMD			
Source: Commission on Elections

=== Fifth district ===
Incumbent PM Vargas (Lakas–CMD) is running for a second term. He was elected under PDP–Laban with 50.69% of the vote in 2022.

Candidate	Party	Votes	%
PM Vargas (incumbent)	Lakas–CMD	104,266	50.06
Rose Lin	Independent	92,984	44.65
Rose de Guzman	Workers' and Peasants' Party	6,112	2.93
Fidela Mallari	Independent	3,078	1.48
Angel Rustia Jr.	Independent	1,829	0.88
Total		208,269	100.00
Registered voters/turnout		281,197	–
Lakas–CMD hold			
Source: Commission on Elections

=== Sixth district ===
Incumbent Marivic Co-Pilar (National Unity Party) is running for a second term unopposed. She was elected with 60.01% of the vote in 2022.

Candidate	Party	Votes	%
Marivic Co-Pilar (incumbent)	National Unity Party	141,794	100.00
Total		141,794	100.00
Registered voters/turnout		220,275	–
National Unity Party hold			
Source: Commission on Elections

== City council elections ==
The Quezon City Council is composed of 38 councilors, 36 of whom are elected.

Party	Votes	%	Seats
Serbisyo sa Bayan Party	3,836,122	72.61	28
Lakas–CMD	283,072	5.36	3
Aksyon Demokratiko	133,048	2.52	1
Partido Federal ng Pilipinas	91,753	1.74	1
Nacionalista Party	77,201	1.46	1
Nationalist People's Coalition	65,350	1.24	0
Akay National Political Party	54,617	1.03	0
Makabayan	11,243	0.21	0
Independent	731,078	13.84	2
Ex officio seats			2
Total	5,283,484	100.00	38
Registered voters/turnout	1,454,411	–	

=== First district ===
Quezon City's 1st councilor district consists of the same area as Quezon City's 1st legislative district. Six councilors are elected from this councilor district.

Candidate	Party	Votes	%
TJ Calalay (incumbent)	Serbisyo sa Bayan Party	111,194	66.72
Bernard Herrera (incumbent)	Serbisyo sa Bayan Party	108,265	64.97
Doray Delarmente (incumbent)	Serbisyo sa Bayan Party	108,159	64.90
Sep Juico (incumbent)	Serbisyo sa Bayan Party	98,036	58.83
Charm Ferrer (incumbent)	Serbisyo sa Bayan Party	90,727	54.44
Nikki Crisologo (incumbent)	Partido Federal ng Pilipinas	83,257	49.96
Gab Atayde	Serbisyo sa Bayan Party	81,261	48.76
Doland Castro	Akay National Political Party	54,617	32.77
Casa Honasan	Independent	13,755	8.25
Roland Manansala	Independent	9,173	5.50
Melodino Villanueva	Independent	8,832	5.30
Benjamin Aromin Jr.	Independent	8,749	5.25
Total		776,025	100.00
Registered voters/turnout		217,676	–
Source: Commission on Elections

=== Second district ===
Quezon City's 2nd councilor district consists of the same area as Quezon City's 2nd legislative district. Six councilors are elected from this councilor district.

Candidate	Party	Votes	%
Mikey Belmonte (incumbent)	Serbisyo sa Bayan Party	198,502	76.99
Candy Medina (incumbent)	Serbisyo sa Bayan Party	190,790	74.00
Bong Liban (incumbent)	Serbisyo sa Bayan Party	184,273	71.47
Aly Medalla (incumbent)	Serbisyo sa Bayan Party	179,818	69.74
Dave Valmocina (incumbent)	Serbisyo sa Bayan Party	172,663	66.97
Rannie Ludovica (incumbent)	Serbisyo sa Bayan Party	151,307	58.68
Nido Perez	Independent	26,943	10.45
Manuel Tenorio	Independent	26,110	10.13
Noel Navat	Independent	20,584	7.98
Josie Fresnillo	Independent	18,316	7.10
Leonardo Taoingan	Independent	16,193	6.28
Total		1,185,499	100.00
Registered voters/turnout		328,316	–
Source: Commission on Elections

=== Third district ===
Quezon City's 3rd councilor district consists of the same area as Quezon City's 3rd legislative district. Six councilors are elected from this councilor district.

Term-limited

- Kate Abigael Coseteng

Candidate	Party	Votes	%
Geleen Lumbad (incumbent)	Serbisyo sa Bayan Party	93,422	67.05
Tope Liquigan	Independent	82,857	59.46
Chuckie Antonio (incumbent)	Serbisyo sa Bayan Party	78,409	56.27
Wency Lagumbay (incumbent)	Nacionalista Party	77,201	55.41
Don de Leon (incumbent)	Serbisyo sa Bayan Party	75,672	54.31
Luigi Pumaren	Serbisyo sa Bayan Party	72,733	52.20
Julian Coseteng	Serbisyo sa Bayan Party	71,457	51.28
Anton Reyes (incumbent)	Nationalist People's Coalition	65,350	46.90
Pau Planas	Partido Federal ng Pilipinas	8,496	6.10
Norma Rufo	Independent	7,942	5.70
Total		633,539	100.00
Registered voters/turnout		172,497	–
Source: Commission on Elections

=== Fourth district ===
Quezon City's 4th councilor district consists of the same area as Quezon City's 4th legislative district. Six councilors are elected from this councilor district.

Term-limited

- Irene Belmonte
- Marra Suntay

Candidate	Party	Votes	%
Vincent Belmonte	Serbisyo sa Bayan Party	125,388	65.07
Egay Yap (incumbent)	Serbisyo sa Bayan Party	111,887	58.06
Nanette Castelo-Daza (incumbent)	Lakas–CMD	101,988	52.92
Imee Rillo (incumbent)	Lakas–CMD	96,062	49.85
Migs Suntay	Independent	94,426	49.00
Raquel Malañgen (incumbent)	Lakas–CMD	85,022	44.12
Kiko del Mundo	Independent	83,712	43.44
Ivy Lim	Serbisyo sa Bayan Party	79,653	41.33
Ali Forbes	Independent	48,523	25.18
Bayani Hipol	Independent	29,876	15.50
Lorevie Caalaman	Makabayan	11,243	5.83
Awin Aquino	Independent	9,697	5.03
James Ibañez	Independent	8,219	4.26
Nestor Andal	Independent	7,902	4.10
Flocerfida Sernias	Independent	4,531	2.35
Total		898,129	100.00
Registered voters/turnout		234,450	–
Source: Commission on Elections

=== Fifth district ===
Quezon City's 5th councilor district consists of the same area as Quezon City's 5th legislative district. Six councilors are elected from this councilor district.

Candidate	Party	Votes	%
Joseph Visaya (incumbent)	Serbisyo sa Bayan Party	157,534	71.29
Aiko Melendez (incumbent)	Serbisyo sa Bayan Party	144,700	65.48
Alfred Vargas (incumbent)	Serbisyo sa Bayan Party	135,104	61.14
Karl Castelo	Aksyon Demokratiko	133,048	60.21
Shay Liban (incumbent)	Serbisyo sa Bayan Party	124,572	56.37
Ram Medalla (incumbent)	Serbisyo sa Bayan Party	120,696	54.62
Enzo Pineda	Serbisyo sa Bayan Party	102,722	46.49
Jonel Quebal	Independent	81,930	37.08
Angel Ortigas	Independent	17,755	8.03
Arpee Sabe	Independent	10,799	4.89
Johnny Gadong	Independent	9,619	4.35
Total		1,038,479	100.00
Registered voters/turnout		281,197	–
Source: Commission on Elections

=== Sixth district ===
Quezon City's 6th councilor district consists of the same area as Quezon City's 6th legislative district. Six councilors are elected from this councilor district.

Candidate	Party	Votes	%
Ellie Juan (incumbent)	Serbisyo sa Bayan Party	120,687	70.91
Banjo Pilar (incumbent)	Serbisyo sa Bayan Party	119,831	70.41
Kristine Matias (incumbent)	Serbisyo sa Bayan Party	118,362	69.54
Vic Bernardo (incumbent)	Serbisyo sa Bayan Party	107,295	63.04
Vito Sotto Generoso (incumbent)	Serbisyo sa Bayan Party	106,186	62.39
Cocoy Medina	Serbisyo sa Bayan Party	94,817	55.71
Louie Saludes	Independent	49,166	28.89
Helen Francisco	Independent	20,094	11.81
Oscar Gomez Jr.	Independent	15,375	9.03
Total		751,813	100.00
Registered voters/turnout		220,275	–
Source: Commission on Elections
