= 2019 Quezon City local elections =

18th Mayoral elections in Quezon City

2019 Quezon City mayoral election
- May 13, 2019
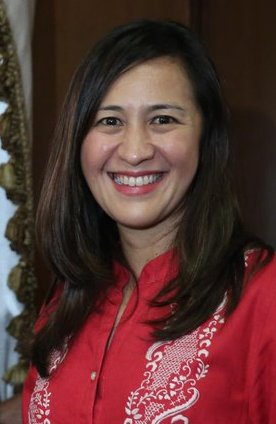

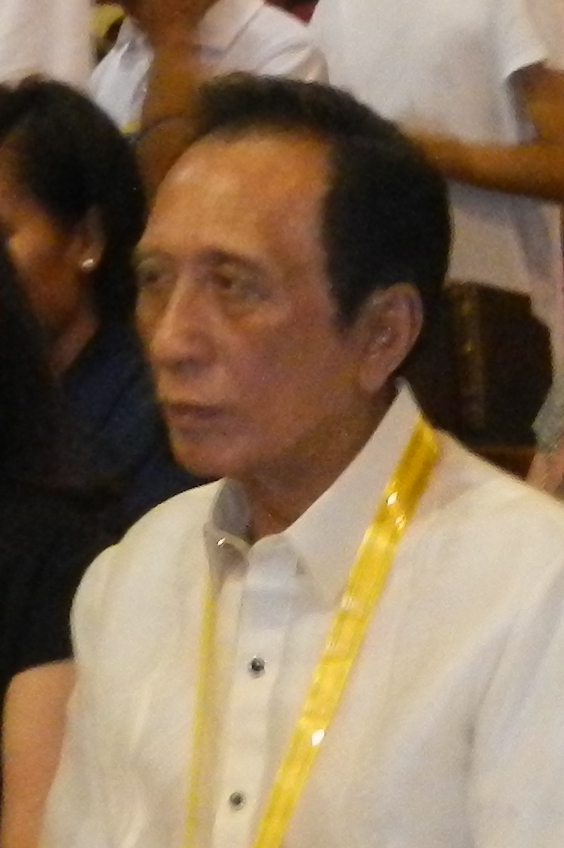

Nominee	Joy Belmonte	Vincent Crisologo	Ismael Mathay III
Party	SBP	PDP–Laban	KDP
Running mate	Gian Carlo Sotto	Jopet Sison	Roderick Paulate
Popular vote	469,480	366,215	19,106
Percentage	54.09	42.19	2.20
Mayor before election
Herbert Bautista
NPC
Elected Mayor
Joy Belmonte
SBP

Local elections were held in Quezon City on May 13, 2019 within the Philippine general election. Registered voters of the city elected candidates for the following elective local posts: mayor, vice mayor, district representative, and six councilors at-large for each district. There are six legislative districts in the city.

== Electoral system ==
=== For mayor, vice mayor and representatives ===
The winner is elected via the first-past-the-post system. The mayor and vice mayor are elected separately, and are elected at-large. Representatives are elected from each of Quezon City's 6 congressional districts.

=== For councilors ===
The winners are elected via multiple non-transferable vote in each of Quezon City's 6 city council districts (coextensive with the congressional districts). A voter has six votes, and can vote up to six people. The six candidates with the highest number of votes in each district wins.

== Tickets ==
=== Serbisyo sa Bayan Party/Serbisyo sa Bayan Party ===
Name	Party
For Mayor
Joy Belmonte	SBP
For Vice Mayor
Gian Sotto	SBP
For House Of Representatives (1st District)
Tita Beth Delarmente	NPC
For House Of Representatives (2nd District)
Precious Hipolito-Castelo	NPC
For House Of Representatives (3rd District)
Allan Benedict Reyes	PFP
For House Of Representatives (4th District)
Bong Suntay	SBP
For House Of Representatives (5th District)
Alfred Vargas	SBP
For House Of Representatives (6th District)
Kit Belmonte	Liberal
For Councilor (1st District)
Ollie Belmonte	SBP
TJ Calalay	SBP
Doray Delarmente	SBP
Jun Ferrer	SBP
Bernard Herrera	SBP
Lena Marie Juico	SBP
For Councilor (2nd District)
Mike Belmonte	SBP
Winnie Castelo	SBP
Bong Liban	SBP
Toto Medalla	SBP
Candy Medina	SBP
Estrella Valmocina	SBP
For Councilor (3rd District)
Jorge Banal	SBP
Kate Coseteng	NUP
John Defensor	SBP
Oryza De Leon	SBP
Wency Lagumbay	Nacionalista
Franz Pumaren	SBP
For Councilor (4th District)
Hero Bautista	SBP
Irene Belmonte	SBP
Ivy Xenia Lagman	SBP
Resty Malañgen	SBP
Imee Rillo	SBP
Marra Suntay	SBP
For Councilor (5th District)
Karl Edgar Castelo	SBP
Allan Butch Francisco	SBP
Shiara Liban	SBP
Ram Medalla	SBP
Patrick Michael Vargas	SBP
Joe Visaya	SBP
For Councilor (6th District)
Bobby Castelo	SBP
Marivic Co-Pilar	SBP
Roger Juan	SBP
Donny Matias	SBP
Eric Medina	SBP
Lala Sotto	SBP

=== Partido Demokratiko Pilipino-Lakas ng Bayan/Serbisyong Crisologo ===
Name	Party
For Mayor
Vincent Crisologo	PDP–Laban
For Vice Mayor
Jopet Sison	PDP–Laban
For House Of Representatives (1st District)
Onyx Crisologo	PDP–Laban
For House Of Representatives (2nd District)
Winsell Beltran	PDP–Laban
For House Of Representatives (3rd District)
Dante De Guzman	PDP–Laban
For House Of Representatives (4th District)
Kit Rodriguez	Independent
For House Of Representatives (5th District)
Rey Miranda	PDP–Laban
For House Of Representatives (6th District)
Johnny Domino	PDP–Laban
For Councilor (1st District)
Abe Abesamis	NPC
Nikki Crisologo	PDP–Laban
Eldridge de Castro	PDP–Laban
Bong Vinzons	PDP–Laban
For Councilor (2nd District)
Ric Bello	PDP–Laban
Eddie Garcia	PDP–Laban
Charlie Mangune	PDP–Laban
Emerita Pecson	PDP–Laban
Jimmy Penepona	PDP–Laban
Michelle Umali	PDP–Laban
For Councilor (3rd District)
Jaime Borres	PDP–Laban
Michael Cu-Moreno	PDP–Laban
Arlene de Guzman	PDP–Laban
Bernie Leyte	PDP–Laban
Richard Uy	PDP–Laban
For Councilor (4th District)
Jan Marini Alano	PDP–Laban
Darwin Aquino	PDP–Laban
Christine de Guzman	PDP–Laban
Moises Gomez	PDP–Laban
James Ibañez	PDP–Laban
For Councilor (5th District)
Retchel Go	PDP–Laban
Abigail Millar	PDP–Laban
Gani Oro	PDP–Laban
Aileen Papin	PDP–Laban
Bobot Pintado	PDP–Laban
Polly Yllana	PDP–Laban
For Councilor (6th District)
Hadji Liban	PDP–Laban
Jaja Mantele-Tin	PDP–Laban
Louie Saludes	PDP–Laban
Charlie Santiago	PDP–Laban
Sotero Vargas	PDP–Laban
Shirly Velasco	PDP–Laban

=== Katipunan ng Demokratikong Pilipino ===
Name	Party
For Mayor
Chuck Mathay	KDP
For Vice Mayor
Roderick Paulate	KDP
For House Of Representatives (2nd District)
Mary Ann Susano	KDP
For Councilor (2nd District)
Ferdinand Beltran	KDP
Herbert Paulate	KDP
Alejandro Tarca	KDP

=== Pederalismo ng Dugong Dakilang Samahan ===
Name	Party
For Mayor
Teodoro Rusios	PDDS
For Vice Mayor
Cinderella Ladisla	PDDS
For Councilor (6th District)
Natividad Cezar	PDDS
Adina Suliman	PDDS

=== Philippine Green Republican Party ===
For Mayor
Alex Lague	PGRP
For Councilor (2nd District)
Glenda Araneta	PGRP

=== Pwersa ng Masang Pilipino ===
For Councilor (3rd District)
Albert Antonio III	PMP

=== Partido ng Manggagawa ===
For Mayor
Henry Samonte	PM
For Vice Mayor
Rolando Jota	PM

=== Independents ===
Independent
Name	Party
For Mayor
Romeo Acebedo	Independent
Esmeraldo Balosa	Independent
Emma Orozco	Independent
Andoy Rosales	Independent
For Vice Mayor
Allan Bantilo	Independent
For Councilor (1st District)
Benjamin Aromin	Independent
Roger Quinton	Independent
Melodino Villanueva	Independent
For Councilor (2nd District)
Antonio Denosta	Independent
Vivian Gatdula	Independent
Leo Mendoza	Independent
Nido Perez	Independent
Mario Rillo	Independent
Norberto Rivero	Independent
For Councilor (3rd District)
Apollo Arguilla	Independent
Robert Pacheco	Independent
Danton Remoto	Independent
Moises Villanueva, Jr.	Independent
For Councilor (4th District)
Marc Tan	Independent
For Councilor (5th District)
Jose Arnel Quebal	Independent
Manuel Tolentino III	Independent
For Councilor (6th District)
Eric Richard Baseleres	Independent
Conde Leo Bellosillo	Independent
Juanito Camano, Jr.	Independent
Garry Famorca	Independent

== Mayoralty election ==
Quezon City mayoral election
Party	Candidate	Votes	%
SBP	Josefina Belmonte	469,480	54.09
PDP–Laban	Vincent Crisologo	366,215	42.19
KDP	Chuck Mathay	19,106	2.20
Independent	Emma Orozco	3,588	0.41
PM	Henry Samonte	2,810	0.32
Independent	Romeo Acebedo	2,142	0.24
Independent	Andoy Rosales	2,128	0.24
Independent	Esmeraldo Balosa	1,129	0.13
PGRP	Alex Lague	828	0.09
PDDS	Teodoro Rusios	555	0.06
Total votes		867,981	100.00

== Vice mayoral election ==
Quezon City Vice mayoral election
Party	Candidate	Votes	%
SBP	Gian Carlo Sotto	382,393	44.90
PDP–Laban	Jopet Sison	343,473	40.33
KDP	Roderick Paulate	112,697	13.23
Independent	Allan Bantilo	8,064	0.94
PDDS	Cinderella Ladisla	2,854	0.33
PM	Rolando Jota	2,067	0.24
Total votes		851,548	100.00

== Congressional elections ==
=== 1st District ===
2019 Philippine House of Representatives election in the 1st District of Quezon City
Party	Candidate	Votes	%
PDP–Laban	Anthony Peter Crisologo	74,033	55.20
NPC	Elizabeth Delarmente	56,833	42.30
Independent	Andres Samson	3,327	2.50
Total votes		134,193	100.00
PDP–Laban hold			

=== 2nd District ===
2019 Philippine House of Representatives election in the 2nd District of Quezon City
Party	Candidate	Votes	%
NPC	Precious Hipolito-Castelo	109,515	54.30
KDP	Mary Ann Susano	48,924	24.30
PFP	Dante Liban	23,089	11.40
PDP–Laban	Winsell Beltran-Cordora	15,108	7.50
Independent	Virgilio Garcia	5,032	2.50
Total votes		201,668	100.00
NPC hold			

=== 3rd District ===
2019 Philippine House of Representatives election in the 3rd District of Quezon City
Party	Candidate	Votes	%
PFP	Allan Benedict Reyes	70,184	74.50
PDP–Laban	Dante de Guzman	22,204	23.60
PDDS	Jessie Dignadice	1,826	1.90
Total votes		94,214	100.00
PFP gain from Liberal			

=== 4th District ===
2019 Philippine House of Representatives election in the 4th District of Quezon City
Party	Candidate	Votes	%
PDP–Laban	Bong Suntay	103,338	85.20
Independent	Kit Rodriguez	17,991	14.80
Total votes		121,329	100.00
PDP–Laban gain from Independent			

=== 5th District ===
2019 Philippine House of Representatives election in the 5th District of Quezon City
Party	Candidate	Votes	%
SBP	Alfred Vargas	132,047	85.70
Independent	Angelito Francisco	9,064	5.90
PDP–Laban	Rey Miranda	7,585	4.90
Lakas	Joel Miranda	2,813	1.80
Independent	Victor Francisco	2,527	1.70
Total votes		154,036	100.00
SBP hold			

=== 6th District ===
2019 Philippine House of Representatives election in the 6th District of Quezon City
Party	Candidate	Votes	%
Liberal	Christopher "Kit" Belmonte	94,673	83.10
PDP–Laban	Johnny Domino	17,607	15.50
PDDS	Maria Cecilia Fabilane	1,604	1.40
Total votes		113,884	100.00
Liberal hold			

== City Council elections ==
=== 1st District ===
City Council election at Quezon City's 1st district
Party	Candidate	Votes	%
SBP	Bernard Herrera	88,206	
SBP	Lena Marie Juico	84,678	
SBP	Dorothy Delarmente	84,461	
SBP	TJ Calalay	83,199	
PDP–Laban	Nikki Crisologo	80,094	
SBP	Victor Ferrer, Jr.	79,400	
SBP	Ollie Belmonte	74,190	
NPC	Abe Abesamis	46,086	
PDP–Laban	Bong Vinzons	25,519	
PDP–Laban	Eldridge de Castro	22,521	
Independent	Melodino Villanueva	7,926	
Independent	Benjamin Aromin	5,845	
Independent	Roger Quinton	5,814	
Total votes		687,939	100.00

=== 2nd District ===
City Council election at Quezon City's 2nd district
Party	Candidate	Votes	%
SBP	Winnie Castelo	155,183	
SBP	Bong Liban	149,005	
SBP	Candy Medina	136,858	
SBP	Toto Medalla	127,731	
SBP	Miguel Belmonte	125,523	
SBP	Estrella Valmocina	92,487	
PDP–Laban	Michelle Umali	59,258	
KDP	Herbert Paulate	53,939	
PDP–Laban	Charlie Mangune	30,397	
PDP–Laban	Eddie Garcia	27,057	
KDP	Ferdinand Beltran	20,871	
PDP–Laban	Ric Bello	20,086	
PDP–Laban	Emerita Pecson	19,131	
Independent	Norberto Rivero	8,892	
Independent	Mario Rillo	8,577	
KDP	Alejandro Tarca	8,446	
Independent	Leo Mendoza	8,129	
Independent	Antonio Denosta	6,971	
PGRP	Glenda Araneta	6,952	
Independent	Vivian Gatdula	6,829	
Independent	Nido Perez	5,745	
PDP–Laban	Jimmy Penepona	4,161	
Total votes		1,082,228	100.00

=== 3rd District ===
City Council election at Quezon City's 3rd district
Party	Candidate	Votes	%
SBP	Franz Pumaren	66,187	
NUP	Kate Coseteng	63,125	
SBP	John Defensor	57,211	
Nacionalista	Wency Lagumbay	56,541	
SBP	Jorge Banal	53,551	
SBP	Oryza de Leon	48,460	
PMP	Albert Antonio III	41,232	
Independent	Robert Pacheco	26,389	
PDP–Laban	Jaime Borres	26,019	
PDP–Laban	Arlene de Guzman	21,880	
PDP–Laban	Michael Cu-Moreno	16,255	
Independent	Danton Remoto	7,122	
PDP–Laban	Richard Uy	6,670	
Independent	Moises Villanueva, Jr.	5,481	
PDP–Laban	Bernie Leyte	4,285	
Independent	John Boquiren	3,528	
Independent	Apollo Arguilla	2,867	
Total votes		506,803	100.00

=== 4th District ===
City Council election at Quezon City's 4th district
Party	Candidate	Votes	%
SBP	Imee Rillo	92,798	
SBP	Marra Suntay	88,531	
SBP	Irene Belmonte	86,770	
SBP	Resty Malañgen	85,499	
SBP	Ivy Xenia Lagman	77,836	
SBP	Hero Bautista	58,743	
PDP–Laban	Jan Marini Alano	37,714	
PDP–Laban	Christine de Guzman	31,262	
PDP–Laban	Darwin Aquino	21,867	
PDP–Laban	James Ibañez	17,877	
PDP–Laban	Moises Gomez	15,967	
Independent	Marc Tan	12,177	
Total votes		627,041	100.00

=== 5th District ===
City Council election at Quezon City's 5th district
Party	Candidate	Votes	%
SBP	Joe Visaya	127,115	
SBP	Karl Edgar Castelo	110,964	
SBP	Patrick Michael Vargas	93,364	
SBP	Shiara Liban	88,204	
SBP	Ram Medalla	83,524	
SBP	Allan Butch Francisco	73,599	
PDP–Laban	Abi Millar	58,350	
Independent	Jose Arnel Quebal	41,183	
PDP–Laban	Polly Yllana	35,913	
PDP–Laban	Retchel Go	28,712	
PDP–Laban	Aileen Papin	28,443	
PDP–Laban	Gani Oro	21,218	
PDP–Laban	Boboy Pintado	10,698	
Total votes		801,287	100.00

=== 6th District ===
City Council election at Quezon City's 6th district
Party	Candidate	Votes	%
SBP	Marivic Co-Pilar	93,204	
SBP	Bobby Castelo	89,761	
SBP	Roger Juan	89,338	
SBP	Lala Sotto	82,713	
SBP	Donny Matias	82,688	
SBP	Eric Medina	73,073	
PDP–Laban	Hadji Liban	21,144	
PDP–Laban	Louie Saludes	20,432	
PDP–Laban	Jaja Mantele-Tin	15,931	
PDP–Laban	Sotero Vargas	15,576	
PDP–Laban	Shirly Velasco	11,076	
PDP–Laban	Charlie Santiago	9,110	
Independent	Eric Richard Baseleres	6,465	
Independent	Conde Leo Bellosillo	4,042	
Independent	Juanito Camano, Jr.	3,147	
PDDS	Adina Suliman	3,116	
Independent	Garry Famorca	3,058	
PDDS	Natividad Cezar	3,045	
Total votes		626,919	100.00
