= 2004 Quezon City local elections =

13th Mayoral elections in Quezon City

2004 Quezon Cty mayoral election
- May 10, 2004
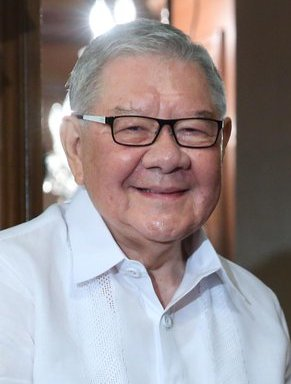

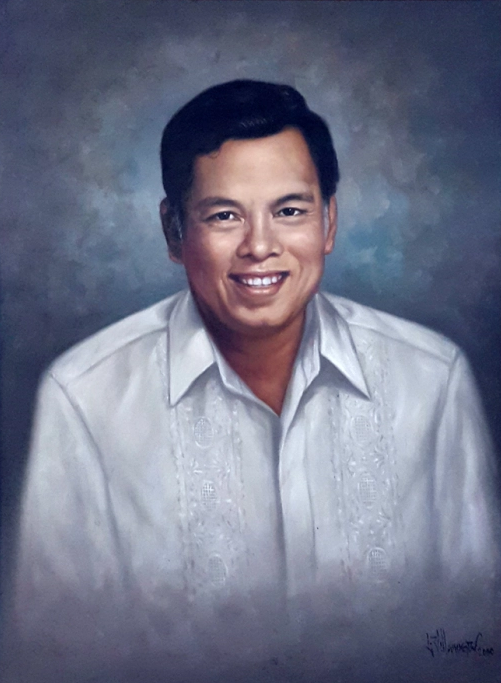
| Nominee | Feliciano Belmonte Jr. | Mel Mathay | Andres Co |
| Party | Lakas | LDP | Independent |
| Alliance | K4 | KNP |
| Running mate | Herbert Bautista | Dingdong Avanzado |
| Popular vote | 604,106 | 167,770 | 2,036 |
| Percentage | 78.06 | 21.68 | 0.26 |
Mayor before election
Feliciano Belmonte Jr.
Lakas
Elected mayor
Feliciano Belmonte Jr.
Lakas

Local elections was held in Quezon City on May 10, 2004, within the Philippine general election. The voters elected for the elective local posts in the city: the mayor, vice mayor, the four Congressmen, and the councilors, six in each of the city's four legislative districts.

== Background ==
Mayor Feliciano Belmonte Jr. was on his first term, and he ran for re-election for second term. Vice Mayor Herbert Bautista was on his first term, and he ran for re-election for second term, and picked by Belmonte as his running mate. Bautista was the running mate of the former's opponent in previous election.

Belmonte will face former Mayor and defeated 2001 congressional candidate Mel Mathay of Laban ng Demokratikong Pilipino (LDP), and independent candidate Andres Co. While Bautista will be challenged by another actor and former Third District Councilor Dingdong Avanzado, Mathay's running mate.

== Results ==
=== For Mayor ===
Mayor Feliciano Belmonte Jr. defeated former Mayor Mel Mathay.

Quezon City Mayoral Elections
| Party | Candidate | Votes | % |
|---|---|---|---|
| Lakas | Feliciano Belmonte Jr. (incumbent) | 604,106 | 78.06 |
| LDP | Mel Mathay | 167,770 | 21.68 |
| Independent | Andres Co | 2,036 | 0.26 |
| Total votes | | 773,912 | 100.00 |
| Lakas hold | | | |

=== For Vice Mayor ===
Vice Mayor Herbert Bautista defeated former 3rd district Councilor Dingdong Avanzado in a huge margin.

Quezon City Vice Mayoralty Elections
| Party | Candidate | Votes | % |
|---|---|---|---|
| Lakas | Herbert Bautista (incumbent) | 658,176 | 86.94 |
| LDP | Dingdong Avanzado | 91,409 | 12.07 |
| Independent | Jamil "Jun" Buscayno | 4,505 | 0.60 |
| Independent | Virgelsal "Mae" Magnaye | 1,469 | 0.19 |
| Independent | Rolando "Rolan" Jota | 1,468 | 0.19 |
| Total votes | | 757,027 | 100.00 |
| Lakas hold | | | |

=== For Representative ===
==== 1st District ====
Reynaldo Calalay was the incumbent until his death on January 11, 2003, leaving his seat vacant.

2004 Philippine House of Representatives election at Quezon City's 1st District
| Party | Candidate | Votes | % |
|---|---|---|---|
| LDP | Vincent Crisologo | 58,077 | 39.94 |
| Lakas | Bernadette Romulo-Puyat | 42,576 | 29.28 |
| Aksyon | Wilma Sarino | 17,438 | 11.99 |
| Independent | Montano "Doc" Ramos | 15,634 | 10.75 |
| PDP–Laban | Moises "Et-Et" Samson | 10,533 | 7.24 |
| Independent | Arturo "Butch" Guerrero III | 1,166 | 0.80 |
| Total votes | | 145,424 | 100.00 |
| LDP hold | | | |

==== 2nd District ====
Ismael Mathay III is the incumbent.

2004 Philippine House of Representatives election at Quezon City's 2nd District
| Party | Candidate | Votes | % |
|---|---|---|---|
| Lakas | Mary Ann Susano | 137,894 | 39.92 |
| LDP | Ismael "Chuck" Mathay III (incumbent) | 123,024 | 35.61 |
| Aksyon | Dante Liban | 82,370 | 23.84 |
| PIBID | Delfin "Kawili" Agcaoili Jr. | 1,270 | 0.37 |
| Independent | Walter Wahab "Wally" Jimenez | 899 | 0.26 |
| Total votes | | 345,457 | 100.00 |
| Lakas gain from LDP | | | |

==== 3rd District ====
Incumbent representative Ma. Theresa Defensor is not running for reelection. His father, Matias Defensor Jr. will ran in her stead.

2004 Philippine House of Representatives election at Quezon City's 3rd District
| Party | Candidate | Votes | % |
|---|---|---|---|
| Liberal | Matias Defensor Jr. | 52,092 | 55.38 |
| KNP | Michael "Mike" Planas | 40,467 | 43.02 |
| Aksyon | Emmanuel "Manny" Baja | 1,508 | 1.60 |
| Total votes | | 94,067 | 100.00 |
| Liberal hold | | | |

==== 4th District ====
Nanette Castelo-Daza is the incumbent.

2004 Philippine House of Representatives election at Quezon City's 4th District
| Party | Candidate | Votes | % |
|---|---|---|---|
| Lakas | Nanette Castelo-Daza (incumbent) | 80,379 | 64.70 |
| NPC | Bong Suntay | 39,446 | 31.75 |
| Independent | Marcel "Marvin" Rillo | 4,129 | 3.32 |
| Independent | Jose "Rene" Infante | 280 | 0.23 |
| Total votes | | 124,234 | 100.00 |
| Lakas hold | | | |

=== For Councilors ===
==== First District ====
City Council Elections in Quezon City's First District
| Party | Candidate | Votes | % |
|---|---|---|---|
| Lakas | Bernadette Herrera-Dy | 87,814 | |
| Lakas | Elizabeth "Beth" Delarmente | 85,834 | |
| Lakas | Victor "Jun" Ferrer Jr. | 79,672 | |
| LDP | Francisco "Boy" Calalay Jr. | 71,036 | |
| LDP | Rommel "Abe" Abesamis | 68,158 | |
| Lakas | Joseph "Sep" Juico | 56,681 | |
| LDP | Antonio "Tonio" Sioson | 45,147 | |
| Lakas | Salvador "Badong" Pleyto, Jr. | 39,704 | |
| Lakas | Martin "Bobot" Diño | 33,013 | |
| LDP | Marcelino Victor "Vic" Veloso Jr. | 29,100 | |
| Independent | George Canseco | 17,594 | |
| LDP | Mildred Templo | 16,652 | |
| LDP | Rodolfo "Rudy" Ubales | 15,360 | |
| PDSP | Emelie "EN" Navarro | 15,096 | |
| LDP | Reynaldo "Rey" Aguas | 13,173 | |
| Reporma | Michael Ruperto "Mike" Fortuno | 7,821 | |
| Independent | Grifton "Grip" Medina | 7,300 | |
| Reporma | Alfredo Marcos "Toby" Alejar | 7,114 | |
| Independent | Cesario "JC" Cordova Jr. | 4,631 | |
| Independent | Teresita "Teta" Rosales | 3,615 | |
| Independent | Gregorio "Greg" Soberano | 2,298 | |
| PMP | Raul "Rolly" Canon | 1,768 | |
| PIBID | Portia Lucasan | 1,506 | |
| Independent | Fidel "Dhet" Leones | 1,299 | |
| PIBID | Cornelio "Leo" Pabustan | 816 | |
| Independent | Glicerio "Glicing" Malana | 793 | |
| PIBID | Raul Caoile | 726 | |
| PIBID | Eduardo "Eddielar" Sangalang | 675 | |
| Total votes | | | 100.00 |

==== Second District ====
City Council Elections in Quezon City's Second District
| Party | Candidate | Votes | % |
|---|---|---|---|
| Lakas | Winston "Winnie" Castelo | 252,491 | |
| Lakas | Mary Aiko Melendez | 232,203 | |
| Lakas | Ramon "Toto" Medalla | 218,150 | |
| Lakas | Voltaire Godofredo "Bong" Liban III | 206,624 | |
| Lakas | Eric Medina | 172,384 | |
| Lakas | Allan "Butch" Francisco | 152,216 | |
| Liberal | Matias John Defensor | 131,975 | |
| Independent | Ismael "Mel" Serrano | 122,587 | |
| Lakas | Louie John "LJ" Saludes | 50,778 | |
| KNP | Aniceto "Chito" Franco III | 42,113 | |
| LDP | Joan "Jo" Tan | 40,307 | |
| LDP | Emerita "Emer" Pecson | 33,384 | |
| PMP | Leonora "Nora" Figueroa | 26,375 | |
| LDP | Sherlita "Lita" Pancho | 21,185 | |
| KNP | Patricio "Pat" Roman | 20,614 | |
| Independent | Romeo "Rolly" Erenio | 17,579 | |
| PIBID | Lope "Pepe" Ilarde | 9,491 | |
| Independent | Fidela "Del" Mallari | 8,064 | |
| PDSP | Joseph Arias | 6,788 | |
| Independent | Jeffrey "Jeff" Lagasca | 6,541 | |
| Independent | Roger Ty | 4,515 | |
| PIBID | Pedro "Pete" Lomibao | 4,465 | |
| Independent | Richard Pe | 2,907 | |
| Independent | Carlito "Carl" Almazan | 2,819 | |
| Independent | Gregory Ernesto "Greg" Mota | 2,023 | |
| Independent | Quintin "Tin" Rocapor | 2,019 | |
| Total votes | | | 100.00 |

==== Third District ====
City Council Elections in Quezon City's Third District
| Party | Candidate | Votes | % |
|---|---|---|---|
| Lakas | Jorge "Bolet" Banal Jr. | 64,590 | |
| Aksyon | Franz Pumaren | 61,948 | |
| Lakas | Wencerom Benedict "Wency" Lagumbay | 61,557 | |
| Lakas | Dante De Guzman | 59,598 | |
| NPC | Julian Coseteng | 57,092 | |
| Lakas | Diorella Maria "Lala" Sotto | 56,831 | |
| Lakas | Jaime "Jimmy" Borres | 31,637 | |
| Independent | Cesar Dario Jr. | 29,193 | |
| LDP | Anselmo Ferdinand "Ansel" Adriano | 23,054 | |
| LDP | Ma. Cristina "Tina" Monasterio | 19,414 | |
| LDP | Alexander "Jun" Genito | 8,941 | |
| LDP | Orlando Herrera | 8,585 | |
| LDP | Letecia "Letty" Ruiz | 8,281 | |
| Bayan Muna | Raymundo "Toto" Carlos | 6,319 | |
| Independent | Simplicio "Jon" Mathay Jr. | 5,428 | |
| LDP | Antonio "Tony" Tamargo | 3,562 | |
| Independent | Benigno "Ninoy" Baluyot | 3,416 | |
| LDP | Annalyn "Ann" Camcam | 1,607 | |
| Independent | Emerito "Omie" Lacandula | 1,240 | |
| Independent | Jose "Junior" Pedregosa | 945 | |
| Total votes | | | 100.00 |

==== Fourth District ====
City Council Elections in Quezon City's Fourth District
| Party | Candidate | Votes | % |
|---|---|---|---|
| Lakas | Edcel Greco Alexandre "Grex" Lagman Jr. | 91,541 | |
| Lakas | Antonio "Ariel" Inton Jr. | 90,820 | |
| Lakas | Alma "Neneng" Montilla | 88,273 | |
| LDP | Janet "Babes" Malaya | 71,036 | |
| Lakas | Restituto "Resty" Malangen | 69,479 | |
| Independent | Bayani Hipol | 69,421 | |
| LDP | Marvin Rillo | 61,093 | |
| LDP | Ramon "Bu" Mathay | 48,836 | |
| Independent | Edgar "Ed" Delfinado | 28,076 | |
| Independent | Ronnie "Idol" Sicat | 23,016 | |
| LDP | Luisito "Nonoy" De Guzman | 14,596 | |
| LDP | Arturo Lee | 12,791 | |
| NPC | Roderick Edwin Cruz | 11,470 | |
| Independent | Edmund "Ed" Altuna | 10,847 | |
| LDP | Arnaldo "Arnell" Ignacio | 6,946 | |
| Independent | Victor Dave Planas | 6,111 | |
| Independent | Angelica Victoria Eunicia Sofia "AV" Planas | 5,868 | |
| Independent | Alberto "Lalde" Garcia | 2,775 | |
| Independent | Marilou "Ma" Eduarte | 2,564 | |
| Independent | Luciano Nohn Battung | 957 | |
| Total votes | | | 100.00 |
