= Serbisyo sa Bayan Party =

Filipino political party based in Quezon City

- Chairman: Joy Belmonte
- Founder: Joy Belmonte
- Founded: 2018
- Headquarters: Quezon City
- Ideology: Localism
- National affiliation: HNP (2018–21)
- Colors: Red
- Quezon City Council: 28 / 36
- House of Representatives: 5 / 6 (Quezon City seats)

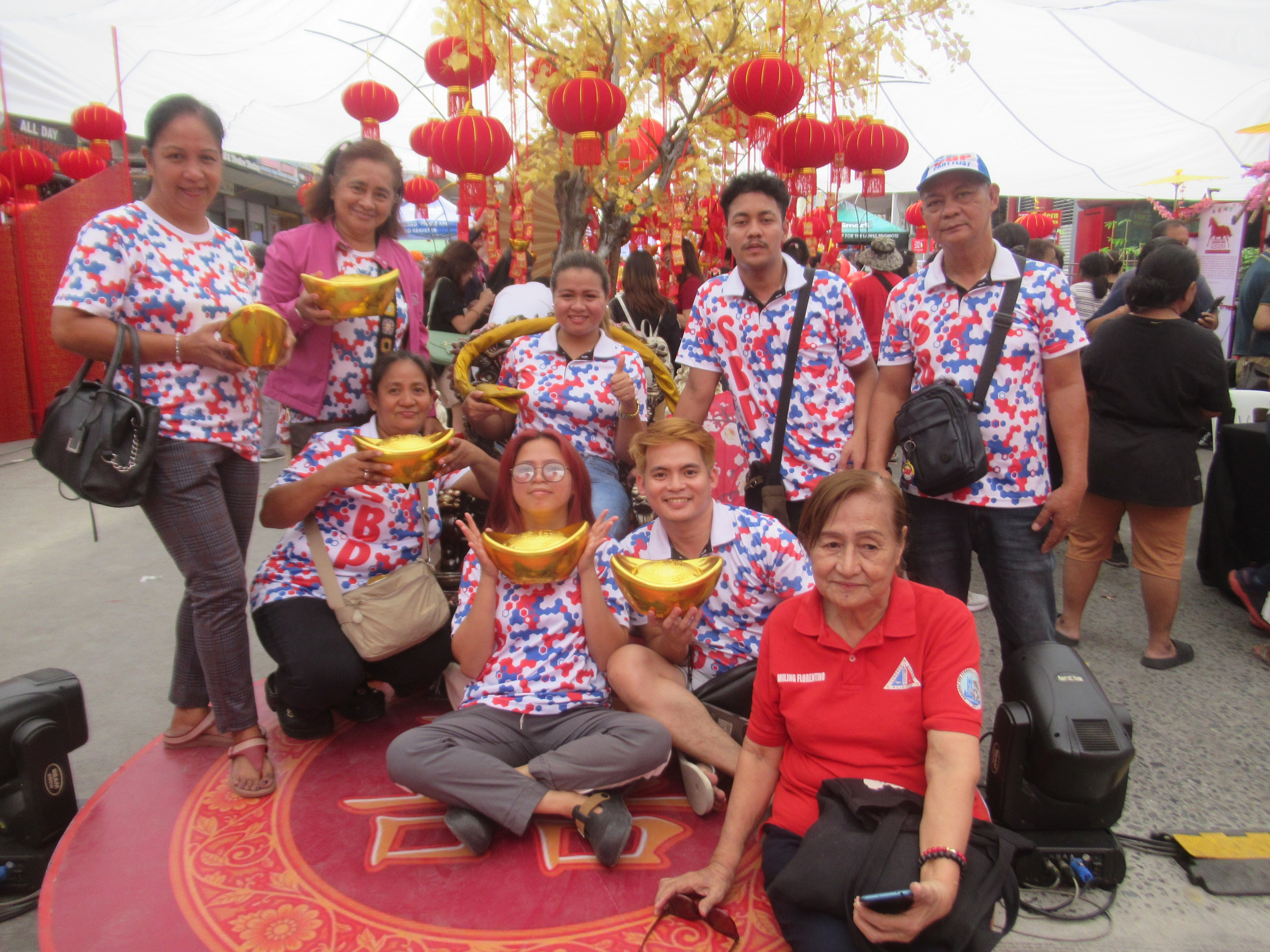
SBP in Banaue Avenue

The Serbisyo sa Bayan Party (SBP; lit. transl. Service on the Nation Party) is a local Quezon City-based political organization. SBP is founded and led by incumbent Quezon City Mayor Joy Belmonte.

SBP had previously forged an alliance with Sara Duterte-led Hugpong ng Pagbabago.

== Electoral performance ==
=== Quezon City mayoral and vice mayoral elections ===
Year	Mayoral election				Vice mayoral election			
Year	Candidate	Votes	Vote share	Result	Candidate	Votes	Vote share	Result
2019	Joy Belmonte	469,480	54.09%	Won	Gian Sotto	382,393	44.90%	Won
2022	Joy Belmonte	662,611	60.43%	Won	Gian Sotto	586,766	56.51%	Won
2025	Joy Belmonte	1,030,730	95.56%	Won	Gian Sotto	938,686	93.48%	Won

=== Legislative elections ===
City Council			House of Representatives districts from Quezon City		
Year	Seats won	Result	Year	Seats won	Result
2019 (Note: Majority of the candidates, (including who lost) are mainly affiliated with the SBP. Two are mainly from other party: Coseteng (NUP), and Lagumbay (Nacionalista).)	33 / 36	Won	2019 (Note: Only two members are from mainly affiliated to SBP (A. Vargas and B. Suntay). Three other members are Hipolito-Castelo (NPC), Reyes (PFP), and K. Belmonte (Liberal). The one who lost is Beth Delarmente (NPC).)	5 / 6	Joined Majority
2022 (Note: Majority of the candidates, (including who lost) are mainly affiliated with the SBP. Two are mainly from other party: A. Vargas (PDP–Laban), and Lagumbay (Nacionalista).)	25 / 36	Won	2022 (Note: Some of the members is named with a national party in the ballot: Pumaren and Co-Pilar (both NUP), Atayde and R. Tulfo (both Independents). The one who lost is B. Suntay (PDP–Laban))	5 / 6	Joined Majority
2025 (Note: Majority of the candidates, (including who lost) are mainly affiliated with the SBP. Four are mainly from other party: Daza, I. Rillo and Malañgen (Lakas), and Lagumbay (Nacionalista).)	28 / 36	Won	2025 (Note: Some of the members is named with a national party in the ballot: Pumaren and Co-Pilar (both NUP), P. Vargas (Lakas), Atayde (Nacionalista) and R. Tulfo (PFP). The one who lost is M. Rillo (Lakas))	5 / 6	Joined Majority

=== Party-list elections ===
Year	Votes	%	Secured Seats	Party-List Seats	Congress	1st Representative	2nd Representative	3rd Representative
2016	280,465	0.87%	1 / 3	59	17th Congress; 2016–2019	Ricardo Belmonte Jr.	—N/a	—N/a
2019	180,535	0.65%	0 / 3	61	18th Congress; 2019–2022	Failed to secure representation in Congress		
2022	Did not participate			63	19th Congress; 2022–2025	Did not participate		
2025	175,520	0.42%	0 / 3	63	20th Congress; 2025–2028	Failed to secure representation in Congress		
Note: For party-list representation in the House of Representatives of the Philippines, a party can win a maximum of three seats.

== Notable members ==
=== Mayor and Vice Mayor ===
- Josefina "Joy" Belmonte (Mayor of Quezon City; founder)
- Gian Carlo Sotto (Vice Mayor of Quezon City; founder)

=== National Legislators ===
- Arjo Atayde (Actor; Quezon City's 1st district Representative)
- Kit Belmonte (Lawyer; Quezon City's 6th district former Representative)
- Precious Castelo (Actress and Newscaster; Quezon City's 2nd district former Representative)
- Marivic Co-Pilar (Quezon City's 6th district Representative)
- Franz Pumaren (Former collegiate basketball coach; Quezon City's 3rd district Representative)
- Marvin Rillo (Quezon City's 4th district former Representative)
- Bong Suntay (Lawyer and Businessman; Quezon City's 4th district Representative)
- Ralph Wendel Tulfo (Quezon City's 2nd district Representative)
- Alfred Vargas (Actor; Quezon City's 5th district former Representative and incumbent councilor)
- Patrick Michael Vargas (Quezon City's 5th district incumbent Representative and former councilor)

=== Councilors ===
- Aiko Melendez (Actress; 5th district)
