= Ralph Tulfo =

Member of the Philippine House of Representatives from Quezon City

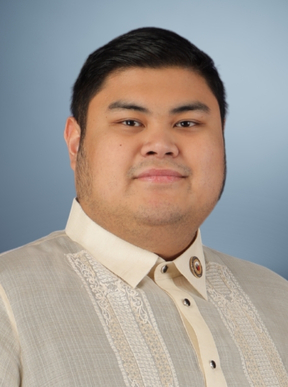
- Official portrait, 2025

Assistant Majority Leader of the House of Representatives of the Philippines
- Incumbent
- Assumed office July 29, 2025 Serving with several others
- Leader: Sandro Marcos

Member of the Philippine House of Representatives from Quezon City's 2nd District
- Incumbent
- Assumed office June 30, 2022
- Preceded by: Precious Hipolito-Castelo

Personal details
- Born: Ralph Wendel Pua Tulfo; July 12, 1996 (age 30) Makati, Metro Manila, Philippines
- Party: PFP (2023–present); SBP (local party; 2021–present)
- Other political affiliations: Nacionalista (2022–2023); Independent (2021–2022)
- Parents: Raffy Tulfo (father); Jocelyn Pua (mother)
- Education: University of Santo Tomas
- Profession: Politician

Ralph Wendel Pua Tulfo (born July 12, 1996) is a Filipino politician who serves as the representative for Quezon City's 2nd district since 2022. He is the son of broadcaster and current senator Raffy Tulfo and ACT-CIS representative Jocelyn Pua.

== Political career ==
Tulfo ran as congressman of Quezon City's 2nd district in 2022, and faced then-incumbent Precious Hipolito-Castelo. Tulfo ran as an independent candidate with the local party Serbisyo sa Bayan Party. He defeated Hipolito-Castelo, ending the Castelo couple's 12-year control of the seat. In October 2022, Tulfo joined the Nacionalista Party.

In 2023, he joined the Partido Federal ng Pilipinas. He was re-elected in 2025.

== Controversies ==
=== Illegal entry at EDSA Busway ===
Tulfo's vehicle was apprehended on separate occasions along EDSA for illegally using the EDSA Busway, a dedicated lane mainly for EDSA Carousel, first on September 26, 2024, and again on January 23, 2025. His father, Senator Raffy Tulfo, defended him on the incident, claiming that he "did not lie or flee" from authorities. Later, Ralph Tulfo later apologized, saying that they have already settled the fines and that they would attend the required seminars as part of the penalty.

=== Lavish party at Las Vegas ===
In 2023, Tulfo and his friends celebrated Christmas at a luxurious nightclub in Las Vegas, United States. A video uploaded seen Tulfo signing a bill worth US$42,000 (or more than ₱2 million). Later, he denied that public funds is used, and stated that its he shared paying the bill with his friends.

== Electoral history ==
Electoral history of Ralph Tulfo
Year	Office	Party		Votes received				Result
Year	Office	Local	National	Total	%	P.	Swing	Result
2022	Representative (Quezon City–2nd)	SBP	IND	127,238	53.81%	1st	—N/a	Won
2025	Representative (Quezon City–2nd)	SBP	PFP	185,164	81.70%	1st	+27.89	Won

== Personal life ==
Tulfo is the son of former TV anchor and current senator Raffy Tulfo and ACT-CIS representative Jocelyn Pua. He also has an alleged older half-sister from his father's previous relationship with Julieta Licup Pearson, Grendy Licup Tulfo.

Tulfo got engaged with Chandreena Moorjani in 2025.
