= Precious Castelo =

Filipino politician and newscaster

Precious Hipolito-Castelo

Member of the Philippine House of Representatives from the Quezon City's 2nd congressional district
- In office June 30, 2019 – June 30, 2022
- Preceded by: Winston Castelo
- Succeeded by: Ralph Wendel Tulfo

Member of the Quezon City Council from the 2nd District
- In office June 30, 2010 – June 30, 2019

Personal details
- Born: Mari Grace Preciosa Hipolito; July 1, 1978 (age 48) Philippines
- Party: Lakas (2021–present)
- Other political affiliations: SBP (2018–2021); NPC (2018–2021); Liberal (2010–2017); PDP–Laban (2017–2018)
- Spouse: Winston Castelo
- Children: 2
- Education: University of Santo Tomas (AB)
- Occupation: Politician; Actress; Newscaster

Mari Grace Preciosa Hipolito-Castelo (born July 1, 1978), commonly known as Precious Hipolito-Castelo, is a Filipina actress, newscaster, and politician who last served as Representative of the 2nd district of Quezon City in the Philippines. She also served as city councilor from the same district from 2010 to 2019. She is a former child star, film and television actress and newscaster. In 1987, she won the FAMAS Award as Best Child Actress for Ang Daigdig Ay Isang Butil Na Luha.

== Acting career ==
In 1985, Precious Hipolito, then 6 years old, reached the finals n Eat Bulaga!'s Little Miss Philippines segment along with Donna Cruz.

Her first film was The Life Story of Julie Vega in 1985. Her next films were Mga Anghel ng Diyos (1986) and Ang Daigdig Ay Isang Butil Na Luha (1986), for which she received the FAMAS Best Child Actress Award. She starred in ABS-CBN's drama anthology Stop: Child Abuse. She joined That's Entertainment Wednesday Group along with Sheryl Cruz, Romnick Sarmenta and Chuckie Dreyfus. She was a newscaster for IBC Express Balita from 2001 to 2009.

== Personal life ==
She studied Communication Arts at the University of Santo Tomas. She is married to Winston Castelo, a former congressman and councilor of Quezon City. They have a daughter and a son.

== Political career ==
In 2010, she was elected to the Quezon City Council, representing the 2nd district, following her husband's election as Congressman in the same district. She was re-elected in 2013 and 2016.

In 2018, she joined the newly created Serbisyo sa Bayan Party and in the 2019 election won a congressional seat in the House of Representatives under the ticket of Joy Belmonte, succeeding her husband. She was named Assistant Majority Floor Leader in August 2019. She was one of the 70 representatives who voted in 2020 to deny the franchise renewal of ABS-CBN. She sought re-election in 2022, this time under Lakas-CMD and the Malayang QC ticket of mayoral bet Mike Defensor, but lost to Ralph Tulfo.

In 2024, Hipolito was charged with graft over the theft of financial aid for government workers in Quezon City during the COVID-19 pandemic in 2020 and 2021. She was later cleared by the Sandiganbayan in 2025.

== Electoral history ==
Electoral history of Precious Castelo
Year	Office	Party		Votes received				Result
Year	Office	Local	National	Total	%	P.	Swing	Result
2010	Councilor (Quezon City–2nd)	—N/a	Liberal	209,510	11.42%	1st	—N/a	Won
2013	Councilor (Quezon City–2nd)	—N/a	Liberal	89,019	13.80%	1st	+2.38	Won
2016	Councilor (Quezon City–2nd)	—N/a	Liberal	164,852	16.19%	1st	+2.39	Won
2019	Representative (Quezon City–2nd)	SBP	NPC	109,515	54.30%	1st	—N/a	Won
2022	Representative (Quezon City–2nd)	—N/a	Lakas	96,565	40.84%	2nd	-13.46	Lost

== Filmography ==
=== Film ===
- The Life Story of Julie Vega (1985)
- Mga Anghel ng Diyos (1986)
- Ang Daigdig Ay Isang Butil Na Luha (1986)
- Cobrador (1986)
- Jockey T'yan (1988)
- Bala Ko ang Hahatol (1988)
- Everlasting Love (1989)
- Babayaran Mo ng Dugo (1989) – Sid's sister
- "Ako ang Batas" -Gen. Tomas Karingal (1989)
- Naughty Boys (1990)
- Anak ng Cabron: Ikalawang Ugat (1991)
- Lumayo Ka Man sa Akin (1992)
- Canary Brothers ng Tondo (1992)

=== Television ===
- Stop: Child Abuse (TV show)
- That's Entertainment (TV show) (1986–1996)
- IBC Express Balita (TV news) (2001–2009)
