= 2010 Quezon City local elections =

15th Mayoral elections in Quezon City

2010 Quezon City mayoral elections
- May 10, 2010
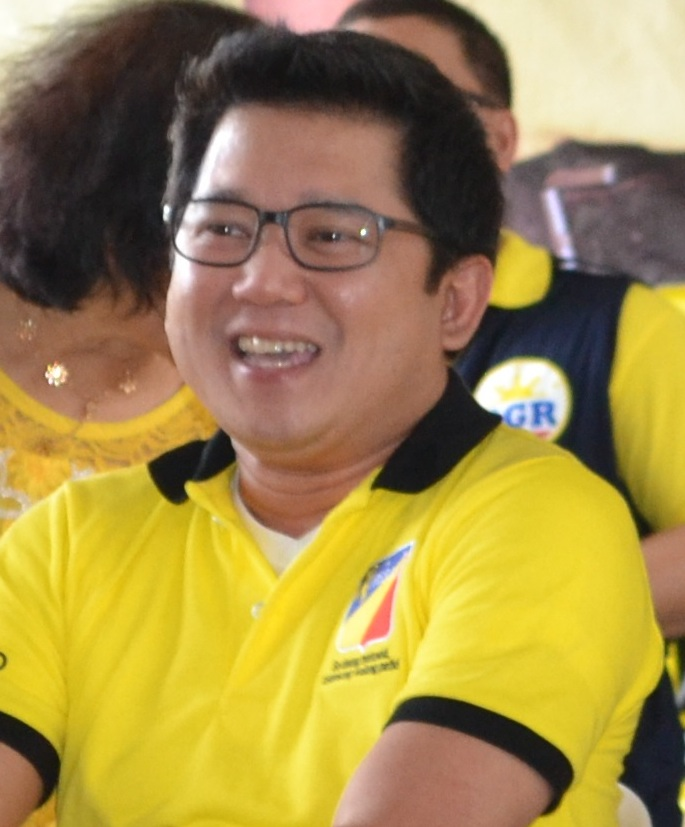
Nominee	Herbert Bautista	Mike Defensor
Party	Liberal	PRP
Running mate	Josefina "Joy" Belmonte	Aiko Melendez
Popular vote	500,563	126,847
Percentage	67.79	17.18
Mayor before election
Feliciano Belmonte, Jr.
Liberal
Elected Mayor
Herbert Bautista
Liberal

Local elections were held in Quezon City on May 10, 2010, within the Philippine general election. The voters elected for the elective local posts in the city: the mayor, vice mayor, four District representatives, and councilors, six in each of the city's four legislative districts.

== Mayoral and vice mayoral election ==
Incumbents mayor Feliciano Belmonte, Jr. and vice mayor Herbert Bautista is now on their third term as mayor and vice mayor of Quezon City. Bautista announced that he is running for the mayorship of the city. They are running under the Liberal Party although Belmonte is the SVP for External Affairs of Lakas-Kampi-CMD. Belmonte's daughter Joy is Bautista's running mate. If Belmonte wins, she will be the third female vice mayor next to Charito Planas and Connie Angeles. Mayor Belmonte is running for a congressional post in the 4th District where he served there as representative from 1992 to 2001. Bautista ran for mayor in 1998, but lost to Ismael Mathay, Jr.

Former three-term mayor Ismael Mathay, Jr. is also running for mayor as an independent candidate. He served as mayor from 1992 to 2001. Before he became mayor, he was the former Quezon City 4th District Representative from 1988 to 1992. He ran for mayor in 2004 but lost to Sonny Belmonte.

Former Presidential Chief of Staff Mike Defensor is running under the Nacionalista Party. Defensor was the former Quezon City 3rd District Representative, then he became the chairman of the Housing and Urban Development Coordinate Council, Secretary of the Department of Environment and Natural Resources and Presidential Chief of Staff. He ran for senator under TEAM Unity, but he ranked 15 in the polls. His running mate is actress and three term 2nd District Councilor Aiko Melendez of the Pwersa ng Masang Pilipino. They are part of the Performance Team, which consists of members (Mayor, Vice Mayor, Congressman & Councilors) from Lakas-Kampi-CMD, NP & PMP. Defensor & Melendez are part of the team.

Quezon City 2nd District Representative Mary Ann Susano is on her second term as representative. She is eligible to run for a third term. But, she insisted to run for mayor under the Nationalist People's Coalition. If she wins, she will be the second female mayor next to Adelina S. Rodriguez. Her running mate is 4th District councilor Janet Malaya. This was the first time that two females are teaming up for the highest positions in the city.

Other candidates for the mayorship are 4th District councilor Ariel Inton, Jay Bautista, John Charles Chang, Engracio Icasiano, Henry Samonte and Roberto Sombillo.

== Candidates ==
=== Team SB ===
Name	Party
For Mayor
Herbert Bautista	Liberal
For Vice Mayor
Joy Belmonte	Liberal
For House Of Representatives (1st District)
Vincent Crisologo	Nacionalista
For House Of Representatives (2nd District)
Winston Castelo	Liberal
For House Of Representatives (3rd District)
Jorge Banal Jr.	Liberal
For House Of Representatives (4th District)
Sonny Belmonte	Liberal
For Councilor (1st District)
RJ Belmonte	Liberal
Francisco Calalay	Nacionalista
Anthony Peter Crisologo	Nacionalista
Alexis Hererra Herrera	Liberal
Joseph Emile Juico	Liberal
Wilma Amoranto-Sarino	Nacionalista
For Councilor (2nd District)
Precious Hipolito-Castelo	Liberal
Godie Liban	Liberal
Aly Medalla	Liberal
Eden Delilah Medina	Liberal
Enrico Serrano	Liberal
Alfred Vargas	Lakas
For Councilor (3rd District)
Jimmy Borres	Liberal
Julian Coseteng	Liberal
Arlene De Guzman-Ronquillo	Liberal
Mike Planas	LDP
Allan Reyes	Liberal
Gian Sotto	Liberal
For Councilor (4th District)
Vincent Belmonte	Liberal
Jessica Daza	Liberal
Edcel Greco Lagman	Liberal
Raquel Malañgen	Liberal
Bong Suntay	Liberal
Bayani Hipol	Liberal

== Results ==
The candidates for mayor and vice mayor with the highest number of votes wins the seat; they are voted separately, therefore, they may be of different parties when elected.

=== Mayoral election results ===
Quezon City mayoral election
Party	Candidate	Votes	%
Liberal	Herbert Bautista	500,563	67.79
PRP	Mike Defensor	126,847	17.18
Independent	Mary Ann Susano	68,339	9.25
Independent	Ismael Mathay Jr.	22,224	3.01
Independent	Ariel Inton	14,225	1.95
Independent	John Charles Chang	3,840	0.52
Independent	Henry Samonte	947	0.13
Independent	Engracio Icasiano	867	0.12
Independent	Roberto Sombillo	586	0.08
Majority		373,716	50.61
Valid ballots		738,438	95.93
Invalid or blank votes		31,339	4.07
Total votes		769,777	100.00
Liberal hold			

=== Vice Mayoral election results ===
Quezon City vice mayoral election
Party	Candidate	Votes	%
Liberal	Joy Belmonte	503,657	69.98
PMP	Aiko Melendez	122,584	17.03
LDP	Janet Malaya	75,302	10.46
Independent	Dave Planas	8,350	1.16
Independent	Allan Bantilo	4,248	0.59
Independent	Rodrigo Kapunan	3,334	0.46
Independent	Ma. Floriza Pusing	851	0.12
KBL	Rolando Jota	773	0.11
Independent	Apolinario Tubera	640	0.09
Majority		381,073	52.95
Valid ballots		719,739	93.50
Invalid or blank votes		50,038	6.50
Total votes		769,777	100.00
Liberal hold			

=== Congressional election results ===
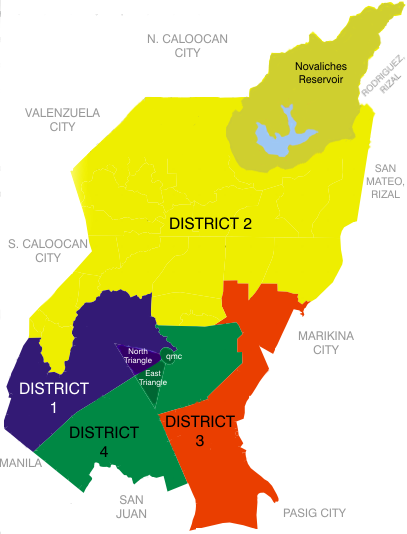
Map of Quezon City's legislative districts.

==== 1st District ====
Vincent "Bingbong" Crisologo is the incumbent representative of the first district of Quezon City.

Crisologo filed a case in the Metropolitan Trial Court of Quezon City for the exclusion of candidate Vivienne Tan from the voter's list of the district, on the grounds that she was not a Filipino citizen when she registered as a voter, and she failed to meet the residency requirements under the law. Tan, the daughter of business magnate Lucio Tan, migrated to the United States and became a naturalized American citizen on January 19, 1993. She returned to the Philippines in 1996 and has resided here since. The court ruled in favor of Crisologo. Tan appealed and won in the Regional Trial Court (RTC), but Crisologo appealed to the Court of Appeals, which disqualified Tan as "Not being a Filipino citizen at the time of her application to be registered as a voter on October 26, 2009 or at the time when her said application was approved by the [Commission on Elections] on November 16, 2009, Tan's inclusion in the voter’s list of Precinct 0853-A, Barangay Santo Domingo, Quezon City, is therefore, highly irregular and downright invalid." The CA ruled in favor of Congressman Bingbong Crisologo. Further, Immigration Commissioner Marcelino Libanan certified that Tan re-acquired her Filipino citizenship only on December 1. On November 8, 2017, the Supreme Court of the Philippines affirmed the ruling of the Court of Appeals. The Supreme Court ruled that Tan was not a Filipino Citizenship at the time when she registered as a voter and thus her inclusion in the voter's list was highly irregular. Tan registered as a voter on October 26, 2009, before taking her Oath of Allegiance to the Republic of the Philippines on November 40, 2009. Under Philippine law, to be able to run for Congress, a candidate is required, among others, to be a natural born citizen of the Philippines, a registered voter in the district in which he or she shall be elected, and a resident thereof for a period of not less than one year immediately preceding the day of the election. The Supreme Court stated that she could not have been a registered voter since when she registered as a voter, she was not a Filipino Citizen. Thus it follows, that Tan could not be a candidate for Congress since she was not a registered voter in the district where she intended to run.

Philippine House of Representatives election at Quezon City's 1st district
Party	Candidate	Votes	%
Nacionalista	Vincent "Bingbong" Crisologo	78,610	60.78
Independent	Vivienne Tan	30,599	23.66
NPC	Elizabeth Delarmante	19,671	15.21
Independent	Benjamin Mariquit	462	0.36
Valid ballots		129,342	94.78
Invalid or blank votes		7,127	5.22
Total votes		136,469	100.00
Nacionalista hold			

==== 2nd District ====
Incumbent Mary Ann Susano is running for mayor of Quezon City.

Philippine House of Representatives election at Quezon City's 2nd district
Party	Candidate	Votes	%
Liberal	Winston Castelo	129,660	37.39
Independent	Christopher Belmonte	105,101	30.31
PMP	Allan Butch Francisco	38,582	11.13
Ang Kapatiran	Dante Liban	28,688	8.27
Independent	Chuck Mathay	26,383	7.61
Independent	Voltaire Godofredo Liban III	15,944	4.60
Buklod	Myrleon Peralta	876	0.25
PGRP	Walter Jimenez	591	0.17
Independent	Fernando Uy	367	0.11
KBL	Norma Nueva	326	0.09
Independent	Dionisio Rellosa, Jr.	253	0.07
Valid ballots		346,771	92.50
Invalid or blank votes		28,121	7.50
Total votes		487,923	100.00
Liberal gain from PMP			

==== 3rd District ====
Matias Defensor, Jr. is the incumbent.

Philippine House of Representatives election at Quezon City's 3rd district
Party	Candidate	Votes	%
Liberal	Jorge Banal, Jr.	37,408	38.02
Lakas–Kampi	Matias Defensor, Jr.	30,887	31.39
NPC	Franz Pumaren	27,611	28.06
Bagumbayan	Catherine Violago	2,254	2.29
Independent	Pedrito Espin	231	0.23
Valid ballots		98,391	95.06
Invalid or blank votes		5,116	4.94
Total votes		103,507	100.00
Liberal gain from Lakas–Kampi			

==== 4th District ====
Incumbent Nanette Castelo-Daza is already in her third consecutive term and is ineligible for reelection.

Philippine House of Representatives election at Quezon City's 4th district
Party	Candidate	Votes	%
Liberal	Feliciano "Sonny" Belmonte, Jr.	99,813	78.42
Lakas–Kampi	Don De Castro	23,476	18.44
PMP	Hans Palacios	3,992	3.14
Valid ballots		127,281	87.38
Invalid or blank votes		18,382	12.62
Total votes		145,663	100.00
Liberal hold			

=== City council elections ===
Each of Quezon City's four legislative districts elects six councilors to the City Council. The six candidates with the highest number of votes wins those district's six seats in the council. Some who are running are celebrities.

==== Summary ====
Party	Votes	%	Seats
Liberal Party	1,644,163	43.57	16
Nationalist People's Coalition	515,920	13.67	3
Lakas Kampi CMD	402,771	10.67	3
Nacionalista Party	377,056	9.99	2
Pwersa ng Masang Pilipino	125,790	3.33	0
Bagumbayan–VNP	107,240	2.84	0
Aksyon Demokratiko	24,127	0.64	0
Laban ng Demokratikong Pilipino	23,057	0.61	0
Philippine Green Republican Party	5,981	0.16	0
Kilusang Bagong Lipunan	644	0.02	0
Independent	547,243	14.50	0
Ex officio seats			2
Total	3,773,992	100.00	26
Total votes	769,777	–	

==== District 1 ====
City Council election at Quezon City's 1st district
Party	Candidate	Votes	%
Nacionalista	Francisco Calalay, Jr.	91,506	13.09
NPC	Dorothy Delarmente	75,689	10.83
Nacionalista	Anthony Peter Crisologo	71,177	10.18
Liberal	RJ Belmonte	69,767	9.98
Liberal	Joseph Emile Juico	69,121	9.89
Liberal	Alexis Herrera	61,150	8.75
NPC	Rommel Abesamis	55,369	7.92
Nacionalista	Wilma Amoranto-Sarino	46,927	6.71
Nacionalista	Raul Medina	34,679	4.96
Nacionalista	Fermin Bilaos	32,442	4.64
Independent	Arnell Ignacio	23,908	3.42
NPC	Abino Andrew Cheng	13,721	1.96
Nacionalista	Ramon Veloso, Jr.	13,206	1.89
Independent	Flora Santos	13,112	1.88
NPC	Marcelino Vergel de Dios, Jr.	7,508	1.07
Liberal	Mark Dominic Mallari	6,749	0.97
Independent	Nestor Borromeo	3,825	0.55
Independent	Roberto Abat	3,301	0.47
PMP	Reynaldo Aguas	2,716	0.39
Independent	Ramon Francisco de Guzman	1,848	0.26
Independent	Fidel Leones	1,472	0.21
Total votes		143,688	100

==== District 2 ====
City Council election at Quezon City's 2nd district
Party	Candidate	Votes	%
Liberal	Precious Hipolito-Castelo	209,510	11.42
Lakas–Kampi	Alfred Vargas	202,370	11.03
Liberal	Eden Delilah Medina	201,160	10.96
Liberal	Julienne Alyson Rae Medalla	180,879	9.86
NPC	Roderick Paulate	178,831	9.74
Liberal	Godie Liban	138,568	7.55
Bagumbayan	Feliciano Valmocina	107,240	5.84
Liberal	Enrico Serrano	64,269	3.50
PMP	Antonio Francisco, Jr.	60,027	3.27
Independent	Ara Mina (Hazel Reyes)	59,429	3.24
Independent	Ranulfo Ludovica	57,656	3.14
Nacionalista	Carlito Bernardino	48,455	2.64
Lakas–Kampi	Glenda Yap (Glenda Garcia)	47,468	2.59
Independent	Benjamin Aquino	35,845	1.95
Independent	Reynaldo Miranda, Jr.	33,064	1.80
Independent	Reginald Francisco	30,216	1.65
Independent	Sotero Vargas	27,008	1.47
PMP	Jose Arnel Quebal	23,344	1.27
NPC	Gerald Jacob	18,367	1.00
NPC	Nicanor John Reyes IV	13,458	0.73
Independent	Alfredo Espinola II	7,752	0.42
Independent	Wilfredo Galvez	7,263	0.40
PMP	Cosme Soriano	6,697	0.36
Independent	Honorio Gaviola	6,682	0.36
NPC	Halil Mapandi	5,821	0.32
Independent	Alberto Dela Cruz, Sr.	4,753	0.26
Independent	Joseph Arias	4,470	0.24
Independent	Alexander Arañez	4,119	0.22
Independent	Samuel Rodriguez	4,116	0.22
Independent	Angelito Aldiano	4,112	0.22
Independent	Resty Perez	4,025	0.22
Independent	Diamond Kalaw	3,921	0.21
Independent	Hermie Bathaluna	3,690	0.20
PGRP	Alexander Arciaga	3,677	0.20
Independent	Henry Giron	3,353	0.18
Independent	Elvis Vergil Magnaye	3,319	0.18
Independent	Marianito Prieto	3,196	0.17
Independent	Pastor Cayobit	3,100	0.17
Independent	Edison Mijares	2,804	0.15
Independent	Bernard Wilfred Sapitula	2,638	0.14
Independent	Rolando Galura	2,626	0.14
Independent	Esmeraldo Jose Balosa	2,541	0.14
Independent	Domingo Pacis, Jr.	2,048	0.11
Independent	Demetrio Sacueza	1,240	0.07
Total votes		374,892	100.00

==== District 3 ====
City Council election at Quezon City's 3rd district
Party	Candidate	Votes	%
Liberal	Julian Coseteng	42,615	8.24
Liberal	Allan Benedict Reyes	40,786	7.89
Liberal	Jimmy Borres	39,657	7.67
Lakas–Kampi	Don De Leon	37,308	7.22
Liberal	Gian Sotto	34,948	6.76
Lakas–Kampi	Pinggoy Lagumbay	31,106	6.02
Liberal	Arlene De Guzman-Ronquillo	29,655	5.74
Lakas–Kampi	Bert Nazal	25,047	4.84
PMP	James Albert Dichaves	23,969	4.64
LDP	Mike Planas	23,058	4.46
NPC	Wendy Lim	22,455	4.34
NPC	Mario De Guzman	21,277	4.12
Lakas–Kampi	John Philip Lesaca	20,911	4.04
Lakas–Kampi	Beda Torrecampo	19,755	3.82
Independent	Jopet Inton	16,349	3.16
Independent	Ogie Diaz (Roger Pandaan)	14,543	2.81
Lakas–Kampi	Mike Gonzales	13,295	2.57
Independent	Jaime Fabregas	12,777	2.47
NPC	Totoy Carlos	11,910	2.30
Independent	Juliet Ginete	8,921	1.73
Independent	Elmer Maturan	5,870	1.14
NPC	Regina Hernandez	4,002	0.77
NPC	Gil Modesto	3,353	0.65
Independent	Ambrocio Cañete	3,130	0.61
PMP	Rodrigo Escober	2,590	0.50
Independent	Tonton Rebulado	2,583	0.50
Independent	Andoy Rosales	1,421	0.27
PGRP	Tony Tamargo	1,161	0.22
PGRP	Floro Villanueva	1,143	0.22
Independent	Emmanuel Cabañez	800	0.15
Independent	Alex Cachila	661	0.13
Total votes		105,534	100.00

==== District 4 ====
City Council election at Quezon City's 4th district
Party	Candidate	Votes	%
Liberal	Edcel Greco Lagman	89,242	12.35
Liberal	Bong Suntay	88,365	12.23
Liberal	Jessica Daza	82,829	11.02
Liberal	Raquel Malangen	74,372	10.31
Liberal	Vincent Belmonte	72,326	10.01
NPC	Marvin Rillo	54,174	7.50
Liberal	Bayani Hipol	51,231	7.09
Independent	Suzette Bernardo	44,720	6.19
Nacionalista	Edwin Rodriguez	23,990	3.32
NPC	Inday Ong	22,113	3.06
Independent	Joel Sison	19,217	2.66
Aksyon	Laraine Sarmiento	17,095	2.37
Independent	Jigo Garcia	14,927	2.07
Nacionalista	Leo Ferrer	14,674	2.03
Aksyon	Xyrus Lanot	7,032	0.97
PMP	Nonoy De Guzman	6,447	0.89
Independent	Angela Victoria Planas	5,250	0.73
Independent	Ricky Davao (Frederick Dabao)	5,109	0.71
NPC	Edgar Delfinado	4,260	0.59
Lakas–Kampi	Raquel Bracero	4,205	0.58
Independent	Ed Altuna	3,737	0.52
Independent	Bobit Aquino	3,513	0.49
Independent	Regina Celeste San Miguel	2,725	0.38
Independent	Jay Ocampo	1,891	0.26
NPC	Carl Amadeus Fider	1,817	0.25
NPC	Teddy Borres	1,795	0.25
Independent	Jun Lipnica	1,716	0.24
Independent	James Ibañez	1,651	0.23
Independent	Orlan Arellano	1,325	0.18
Lakas–Kampi	Maria Isabel Lopez (Maria Isabel Yokohama)	1,306	0.18
Independent	Jerrilyn Cruz	1,196	0.17
Independent	Andy Moran	759	0.11
KBL	Gerry Sabiniano	644	0.09
Total votes		145,663	100.00
