= Patrick Michael Vargas =

Filipino politician (born 1982)

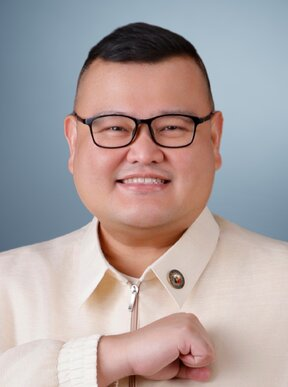
- Official portrait, 2025

House Deputy Majority Leader
- Incumbent
- Assumed office July 29, 2025
- Leader: Sandro Marcos

Member of the House of Representatives from Quezon City’s 5th district
- Incumbent
- Assumed office June 30, 2022
- Preceded by: Alfred Vargas

Member of the Quezon City Council from the 5th District
- In office June 30, 2019 – June 30, 2022

Personal details
- Born: Patrick Michael Dumlao Vargas; January 27, 1982 (age 44)
- Party: PFP (2026–present); SBP (local party; 2018–present)
- Other political affiliations: Lakas (2022–2026); PDP–Laban (2021–2022)
- Spouse: Christine Marie Rockett
- Relatives: Alfred Vargas (brother)
- Education: Ateneo de Manila University (BA)
- Occupation: Politician

Patrick Michael Dumlao Vargas (born January 27, 1982), also known as PM Vargas, is a Filipino politician. He is currently serving as representative of the 5th District of Quezon City in the House of Representatives of the Philippines since 2022. He served as member of Quezon City Council from 2019 to 2022.

== Early life and education ==
Vargas was born on January 27, 1982 to Alfredo Vargas Jr. and Susana Dumlao. He studied Ateneo de Manila High School for his secondary education. He studied Ateneo de Manila University with the degree of political science.

== Political career ==
=== Councilor (2019–2022) ===
Vargas became a member of Quezon City Council from 2019 to 2022.

=== House of Representatives (2022–present) ===
In 2022, Vargas was elected as representative for the fifth district of Quezon City.

== Personal life ==
Vargas is married to Christine Marie Rockett and has one son.

His brother, Alfred Vargas, is also a representative for fifth district of Quezon City (2013–2022) and councilor of Quezon City (2010–2013; 2022–present).

== Electoral history ==
Electoral history of Patrick Michael Vargas
Year	Office	Party		Votes received				Result
Year	Office	Local	National	Total	%	P.	Swing	Result
2019	Councilor (Quezon City–5th)	SBP	—N/a	93,364	—N/a	3rd	—N/a	Won
2022	Representative (Quezon City–5th)	SBP	PDP–Laban	104,869	50.69%	1st	—N/a	Won
2025	Representative (Quezon City–5th)	SBP	Lakas	104,266	50.06%	1st	—N/a	Won
