= Marvin Rillo =

Filipino politician (born 1976)

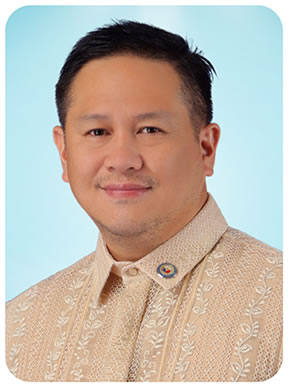
- Official portrait, 2022

Member of the House of Representatives from Quezon City's 4th District
- In office June 30, 2022 – June 30, 2025
- Preceded by: Jesus Manuel C. Suntay
- Succeeded by: Jesus Manuel C. Suntay

Member of the Quezon City Council
- In office June 30, 2010 – June 30, 2019
- Constituency: 4th district
- In office 1996–2001
- Constituency: Sangguniang Kabataan

Personal details
- Born: Marvin De Castro Rillo; March 11, 1976 (age 50) Quezon City, Philippines
- Party: Lakas (2021–present); SBP (local party; 2024–present)
- Other political affiliations: Liberal (2012–2021); NPC (2009–2012); LDP (2004–2009); Independent (1996–2001)
- Spouse: Ma. Imelda "Imee" Asuncion (m. 2002)
- Children: 2
- Education: Philippine School of Business Administration (BS)
- Occupation: Politician

Marvin De Castro Rillo (born March 11, 1976) is a Filipino politician. He served as a representative from the Quezon City's 4th district from 2022 to 2025. He served as city councilor from the 4th district from 2010 to 2019 and as an ex officio member representing the city's Sangguniang Kabataan from 1996 to 2001.

== Early life and education ==
Rillo was born on March 11, 1976, in Quezon City. He studied business management at the Philippine School of Business Administration.

== Political career ==
Rillo served as the president of the Sangguniang Kabataan (SK) Federation for Quezon City from 1996 to 2001, making him an ex officio member of the Quezon City Council.

In 2004, Rillo ran as member of the Quezon City Council but he lost.

Rillo successfully ran for a seat on the Quezon City Council from the 4th district in 2010. He served until 2019, when he was term-limited after serving three consecutive terms. His seat went to his wife, Imee.

In 2022, Rillo narrowly defeated his former ally Bong Suntay in the congressional race with a margin of less than 2,000 votes separating the two. He is one of the freshmen who defeated incumbents in the city.

In 2025, Rillo lost re-election bid to Bong Suntay by 239 votes.

== Legal disputes and controversies ==
In April 2025, Peanut Gallery Media Network (PGMN) anchor CJ Hirro alleged irregularities regarding a ₱75 million building project at the Carlos L. Albert High School in Barangay Santol, Quezon City. The project was overseen by Rillo, who dismissed the claims and blamed them for his failed 2025 reelection bid. Rillo filed an initial cyberlibel suit against Hirro in June 2025. On May 11, 2026, he requested that the National Bureau of Investigation (NBI) file four additional cyberlibel complaints against her, citing subsequent reports linking him to a broader flood control projects scandal, wherein Curlee and Sarah Discaya alleged his involvement in a massive kickback scheme.

== Personal life ==
Since 2002, Rillo is married to Imee Asuncion, with whom he has two children.

== Electoral history ==
Electoral history of Marvin Rillo
Year	Office	Party		Votes received				Result
Year	Office	Local	National	Total	%	P.	Swing	Result
2004	Councilor (Quezon City–4th)	—N/a	LDP	61,093	—N/a	7th	—N/a	Lost
2010	Councilor (Quezon City–4th)	—N/a	NPC	54,174	7.50%	6th	—N/a	Won
2013	Councilor (Quezon City–4th)	—N/a	Liberal	70,290	12.41%	2nd	—N/a	Won
2016	Councilor (Quezon City–4th)	—N/a	Liberal	101,548	16.01%	1st	—N/a	Won
2022	Representative (Quezon City–4th)	—N/a	Lakas	83,517	50.59%	1st	—N/a	Won
2025	Representative (Quezon City–4th)	SBP	Lakas	91,617	49.93%	2nd	—N/a	Lost
