= Quezon City's 6th congressional district =

Legislative district of the Philippines

- Constituency for the House of Representatives of the Philippines
- Interactive map for the district boundaries
- City: Quezon City
- Region: Metro Manila
- Population: 514,516 (2020)
- Electorate: 220,275 (2025)
- Major settlements: 11 barangays: Apolonio Samson, Baesa, Balon-Bato, Culiat, New Era, Pasong Tamo, Sangandaan, Sauyo, Talipapa, Tandang Sora, Unang Sigaw
- Area: 21.97 km^{2} (8.48 sq mi)

Current constituency
- Created: 2012
- Representative: Marivic Co-Pilar
- Political party: NUP; SBP
- Congressional bloc: Majority

Quezon City's 6th congressional district is one of the six congressional districts of the Philippines in Quezon City. It has been represented in the House of Representatives of the Philippines since 2013. Previously included in the 2nd district, it includes the barangays bordering the southern enclave of Caloocan more popularly known as Balintawak and the Tandang Sora area. Primarily residential, it is currently represented in the 20th Congress by Ma. Victoria Co-Pilar of the National Unity Party (NUP) and Serbisyo sa Bayan Party (SBP).

== Representation history ==
#	Image	Member	Term of office		Congress	Party	Electoral history	Constituent LGUs
#	Image	Member	Start	End	Congress	Party	Electoral history	Constituent LGUs
=== Quezon City's 6th district for the House of Representatives of the Philippines ===
District created July 2, 2012 from Quezon City's 2nd district.
1		Kit Belmonte	June 30, 2013	June 30, 2022	16th	Liberal (SBP)	Elected in 2013.	2013–present Apolonio Samson, Baesa, Balon-Bato, Culiat, New Era, Pasong Tamo, Sangandaan, Sauyo, Talipapa, Tandang Sora, Unang Sigaw
1		Kit Belmonte	June 30, 2013	June 30, 2022	17th	Liberal (SBP)	Re-elected in 2016.	2013–present Apolonio Samson, Baesa, Balon-Bato, Culiat, New Era, Pasong Tamo, Sangandaan, Sauyo, Talipapa, Tandang Sora, Unang Sigaw
1		Kit Belmonte	June 30, 2013	June 30, 2022	18th	Liberal (SBP)	Re-elected in 2019.	2013–present Apolonio Samson, Baesa, Balon-Bato, Culiat, New Era, Pasong Tamo, Sangandaan, Sauyo, Talipapa, Tandang Sora, Unang Sigaw
2		Marivic Co-Pilar	June 30, 2022	Incumbent	19th	NUP (SBP)	Elected in 2022.	2013–present Apolonio Samson, Baesa, Balon-Bato, Culiat, New Era, Pasong Tamo, Sangandaan, Sauyo, Talipapa, Tandang Sora, Unang Sigaw
2		Marivic Co-Pilar	June 30, 2022	Incumbent	20th	NUP (SBP)	Re-elected in 2025.	2013–present Apolonio Samson, Baesa, Balon-Bato, Culiat, New Era, Pasong Tamo, Sangandaan, Sauyo, Talipapa, Tandang Sora, Unang Sigaw

== Election results ==
=== 2013 ===
2013 Philippine House of Representatives election at Quezon City's 6th district
Party	Candidate	Votes	%
Liberal	Kit Belmonte	78,887	79.45
Valid ballots		78,887	79.45
Invalid or blank votes		20,368	20.52
Total votes		99,255	100.00
Liberal win (new seat)			

=== 2016 ===
2016 Philippine House of Representatives election at Quezon City's 6th district
Party	Candidate	Votes	%
Liberal	Kit Belmonte	102,171	
Invalid or blank votes		29,344	
Total votes		131,515	
Liberal hold			

=== 2019 ===
2019 Philippine House of Representatives election in the Quezon City's 6th District
Party	Candidate	Votes	%
Liberal	Kit Belmonte	94,673	83.1%
PDP–Laban	Johnny Domino	17,607	15.5%
PDDS	Maria Cecilia Fabilane	1,604	1.4%
Valid ballots		151,509	90.5%
Invalid or blank votes		15,852	9.5%
Total votes		167,361	100.00%
Liberal hold			

=== 2022 ===
2022 Philippine House of Representatives election in the 6th District of Quezon City
Party	Candidate	Votes	%
NUP	Marivic Co-Pilar	99,544	60.01%
Lakas	Bingbong Crisologo	55,919	33.71%
PDP–Laban	Tricia Nicole Velasco-Catera	10,415	6.28%
Total votes		165,878	100.00%
NUP gain from Liberal			

=== 2025 ===
Candidate	Party	Votes	%
Marivic Co-Pilar (incumbent)	National Unity Party	141,794	100.00
Total		141,794	100.00
Registered voters/turnout		220,275	–
National Unity Party hold			
Source: Commission on Elections

== See also ==
- Legislative districts of Quezon City
