= Annie Rosa Susano =

Filipino politician

- Official portrait, 2007

Member of the House of Representatives of the Philippines from Quezon City's 2nd congressional district
- In office June 30, 2004 – June 30, 2010
- Preceded by: Ismael Mathay III
- Succeeded by: Winnie Castelo

Member of the Quezon City Council from the 2nd district
- In office June 30, 2001 – June 30, 2004

Personal details
- Party: KDP (2018–present)
- Other political affiliations: PMP (2007–2018); Lakas (2004–2007); LDP (2001–2004)

Mary Ann Laborero Susano, commonly known as Annie Rosa Susano or Annie Susano, is a Filipino politician. Philippine legislative records identify her as Mary Ann L. Susano, while contemporary news reports have commonly referred to her as Annie Rosa Susano or Annie Susano. She served as a member of the Quezon City Council from 2001 to 2004 and represented Quezon City's 2nd congressional district in the House of Representatives of the Philippines from 2004 to 2010.

== Background ==
The Philippine Star described Susano in 2004 as a direct descendant of Filipino revolutionary Melchora Aquino, popularly known as Tandang Sora. A 2009 Manila Bulletin report stated that Susano had completed two courses on public governance at Harvard University.

== Political career ==
=== Quezon City Council and House of Representatives ===
Susano served as a councilor for Quezon City's 2nd district from 2001 to 2004. In the 2004 election, she won the congressional seat for the city's 2nd district, defeating incumbent representative Ismael "Chuck" Mathay III and former representative Dante Liban. The Philippine Star reported that Susano received 138,888 votes.

Susano was re-elected in 2007 under Lakas–CMD. Following her re-election, she publicly considered a bid for Speaker of the House, saying that she wanted to reduce patronage in the allocation of leadership positions in the chamber.

During the 14th Congress, Susano was the principal House author of measures establishing two public secondary schools in Quezon City. House Bill No. 5136 became Republic Act No. 9665, which established Baesa National High School, while House Bill No. 5330 became Republic Act No. 9670, which established Apolonio Samson National High School.

=== 2010 Quezon City mayoral campaign ===
Susano ran for mayor of Quezon City in the 2010 elections, losing to then vice mayor Herbert Bautista.

Following the election, Susano alleged irregularities in the automated vote count. During a House inquiry, she presented two compact-flash cards that she said could be connected to manipulation of the Quezon City election results. Officials of the Commission on Elections (Comelec) questioned how the cards had come into her possession and initially considered possible legal action relating to their custody.

Comelec chairman Jose Melo subsequently said that the commission did not, at that point, intend to file charges against Susano, although he said she should explain how she obtained the cards. The House committee examining allegations involving the automated-election system later indicated that election-technology supplier Smartmatic was close to being cleared of the fraud allegations raised during the inquiry.

=== Later candidacies ===
In 2013, Susano ran for representative of the newly created 5th congressional district of Quezon City. She lost to Alfred Vargas, who received 67,753 votes to Susano's 26,267.

Susano again sought a seat in the House in 2019, running in Quezon City's 2nd district as a candidate of Katipunan ng Demokratikong Pilipino. In 2022, she ran for representative of Quezon City's 5th district under the Partido Federal ng Pilipinas.
