= Quezon City's 5th congressional district =

Legislative district of the Philippines

- Constituency for the House of Representatives of the Philippines
- Interactive map of the district boundaries
- City: Quezon City
- Region: Metro Manila
- Population: 596,047 (2020)
- Electorate: 281,197 (2025)
- Major settlements: 14 barangays: Bagbag, Capri, Fairview, Greater Lagro, Gulod, Kaligayahan, Nagkaisang Nayon, North Fairview, Novaliches Proper, Pasong Putik Proper, San Agustin, San Bartolome, Santa Lucia, Santa Monica
- Area: 28.03 km^{2} (10.82 sq mi)

Current constituency
- Created: 2012
- Representative: Patrick Michael Vargas
- Political party: PFP; SBP
- Congressional bloc: Majority

Quezon City's 5th congressional district is one of the six congressional districts of the Philippines in Quezon City. It has been represented in the House of Representatives of the Philippines since 2013. Previously included in the 2nd district, it includes the barangays bordering the northern enclave of Caloocan more popularly known as Novaliches. Primarily a residential area, it is currently represented in the 20th Congress by Patrick Michael Vargas of the Partido Federal ng Pilipinas (PFP) and Serbisyo sa Bayan Party (SBP).

== Representation history ==
#	Image	Member	Term of office		Congress	Party	Electoral history	Constituent LGUs
#	Image	Member	Start	End	Congress	Party	Electoral history	Constituent LGUs
=== Quezon City's 5th district for the House of Representatives of the Philippines ===
District created July 2, 2012 from Quezon City's 2nd district.
1		Alfred Vargas	June 30, 2013	June 30, 2022	16th	Liberal	Elected in 2013.	2013–present Bagbag, Capri, Fairview, Greater Lagro, Gulod, Kaligayahan, Nagkaisang Nayon, North Fairview, Novaliches Proper, Pasong Putik Proper, San Agustin, San Bartolome, Santa Lucia, Santa Monica
1		Alfred Vargas	June 30, 2013	June 30, 2022	17th	PDP–Laban	Re-elected in 2016.	2013–present Bagbag, Capri, Fairview, Greater Lagro, Gulod, Kaligayahan, Nagkaisang Nayon, North Fairview, Novaliches Proper, Pasong Putik Proper, San Agustin, San Bartolome, Santa Lucia, Santa Monica
1		Alfred Vargas	June 30, 2013	June 30, 2022	18th	PDP–Laban	Re-elected in 2019.	2013–present Bagbag, Capri, Fairview, Greater Lagro, Gulod, Kaligayahan, Nagkaisang Nayon, North Fairview, Novaliches Proper, Pasong Putik Proper, San Agustin, San Bartolome, Santa Lucia, Santa Monica
2		Patrick Michael Vargas	June 30, 2022	Incumbent	19th	Lakas (SBP)	Elected in 2022.	2013–present Bagbag, Capri, Fairview, Greater Lagro, Gulod, Kaligayahan, Nagkaisang Nayon, North Fairview, Novaliches Proper, Pasong Putik Proper, San Agustin, San Bartolome, Santa Lucia, Santa Monica
2		Patrick Michael Vargas	June 30, 2022	Incumbent	20th	PFP (SBP)	Re-elected in 2025.	2013–present Bagbag, Capri, Fairview, Greater Lagro, Gulod, Kaligayahan, Nagkaisang Nayon, North Fairview, Novaliches Proper, Pasong Putik Proper, San Agustin, San Bartolome, Santa Lucia, Santa Monica

== Election results ==
=== 2013 ===
2013 Philippine House of Representatives election at Quezon City's 5th district
Party	Candidate	Votes	%
Liberal	Alfred Vargas	64,701	56.29
KKK	Mary Ann Susano	24,819	21.59
UNA	Dante Liban	10,563	9.19
Aksyon	Isagani Oro	4,495	3.91
Margin of victory		39,882	34.70%
Valid ballots		104,578	90.98
Invalid or blank votes		10,369	9.02
Total votes		114,947	100.00
Liberal win (new seat)			

=== 2016 ===
2016 Philippine House of Representatives election at Quezon City's 5th district
Party	Candidate	Votes	%
Liberal	Alfred Vargas	134,946	
Invalid or blank votes		25,398	
Total votes		160,344	
Liberal hold			

=== 2019 ===
2019 Philippine House of Representatives election in the Quezon City's 5th District
Party	Candidate	Votes	%
PDP–Laban	Alfred Vargas	132,047	85.7
Independent	Angelito Francisco	9,064	5.9
Independent	Rey Miranda	7,585	4.9
Lakas	Joel Miranda	2,813	1.8
Independent	Victor Francisco	2,527	1.7
Valid ballots		151,509	90.5
Invalid or blank votes		15,852	9.5
Total votes		167,361	100.00
PDP–Laban hold			

=== 2022 ===
2022 Philippine House of Representatives election in the Quezon City's 5th district
Party	Candidate	Votes	%
PDP–Laban	Patrick Michael "PM" Vargas	104,869	50.69
Lakas	Rose "Ate Rose" Nono-Lin	73,508	35.53
PFP	Mary Ann "Annie" Susano	14,760	7.13
Independent	Catherine "Manang Inday" Esplana	8,557	4.14
Independent	Antonio Ortega	2,803	1.35
Independent	Rose Lynn Sanchez	1,901	0.92
Independent	Angel Rustia Jr.	474	0.23
Total votes		206,872	100.00
PDP–Laban hold			

=== 2025 ===
Candidate	Party	Votes	%
PM Vargas (incumbent)	Lakas–CMD	104,266	50.06
Rose Lin	Independent	92,984	44.65
Rose de Guzman	Workers' and Peasants' Party	6,112	2.93
Fidela Mallari	Independent	3,078	1.48
Angel Rustia Jr.	Independent	1,829	0.88
Total		208,269	100.00
Registered voters/turnout		281,197	–
Lakas–CMD hold			
Source: Commission on Elections

== See also ==
- Legislative districts of Quezon City
