= Marivic Co-Pilar =

Filipino politician

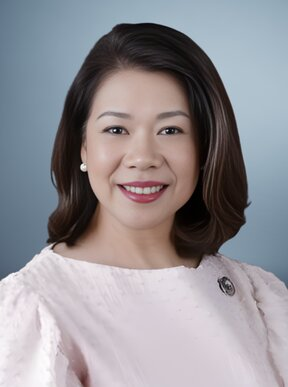
- Official portrait, 2026

Member of the House of Representatives from the Quezon City's 6th District
- Incumbent
- Assumed office June 30, 2022
- Preceded by: Jose Christopher Y. Belmonte

Member of Quezon City Council from the 6th District
- In office June 30, 2013 – June 30, 2022

Personal details
- Born: Maria Victoria Garcia Co; March 25, 1971 (age 55) Santa Cruz, Manila, Philippines
- Party: NUP (2021–present); SBP (local party; 2018–present)
- Other political affiliations: Liberal (2012–2018); Lakas (2007–2012)
- Spouse: Banjo Pilar
- Education: De la Salle University; University of the Philippines; San Sebastian College

Maria Victoria "Marivic" Garcia Co-Pilar (born March 25, 1971) is a Filipino politician who is a member of the Quezon City's 6th congressional district. She was re-elected in 2025.

== See also ==
- List of female members of the House of Representatives of the Philippines
- 19th Congress of the Philippines
- 20th Congress of the Philippines
