= Kit Belmonte =

Filipino lawyer and politician (born 1966)

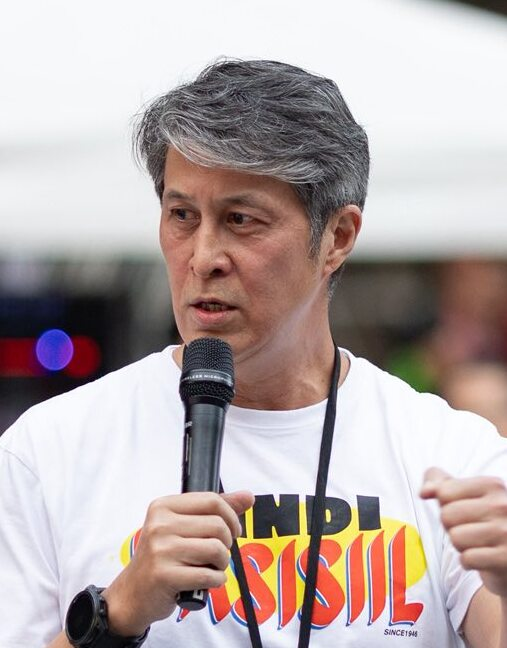
- Belmonte in 2026

Member of the House of Representatives from Quezon City’s 6th district
- In office June 30, 2013 – June 30, 2022
- Preceded by: District established
- Succeeded by: Marivic Co-Pilar

Secretary General of the Liberal Party
- Incumbent
- Assumed office January 24, 2026
- Preceded by: Teddy Baguilat
- In office 2016–2022
- Preceded by: Josephine Sato
- Succeeded by: Teddy Baguilat

Personal details
- Born: Jose Christopher Yuvienco Belmonte; March 19, 1966 (age 60) Baguio, Philippines
- Party: Liberal (2012–present)
- Other political affiliations: SBP (2018–2022); Independent (2009–2012)
- Children: 3
- Relatives: Feliciano Belmonte Jr. (uncle); Joy Belmonte (first cousin)
- Education: University of the Philippines Diliman (BS, LL.B)
- Occupation: Politician
- Profession: Lawyer
- Website: https://kitbelmonte.com/

Jose Christopher "Kit" Yuvienco Belmonte (born March 19, 1966) is a Filipino lawyer and politician. A member of the Liberal Party, he represented the 6th district of Quezon City from 2013 to 2022.

== Early life and education ==
Belmonte was born on March 19, 1966, in Baguio. He is the first child of Dennis Belmonte and Elsie Yuvienco. He attended Maryknoll Convent School for his primary education. He also attended University of the Philippines Baguio for his high school education. He studied University of the Philippines Diliman, where he became a member of UP Alpha Sigma fraternity with the degree of Bachelor of Science in Economics and took up law in the same institution. In 2003, Belmonte passed the bar examination.

== Legal career ==
During his law school, Belmonte served as legislative staff of then-4th district Representative Feliciano Belmonte Jr. as the Paralegal Program Officer for Empowering Civic Participation and Governance before co-founded the Belmonte Sison Sawali and Associates. He became consultant for Liga ng mga Barangay in Quezon City and administrator of Banlat area under Office of the Mayor. He also became a consultant for Office of the Presidential Adviser on political affairs under the Office of the President. In 2022, Belmonte served as a lawyer for Juanito Jose Remulla, the son of Jesus Crispin Remulla for his drug possession case.

== Political career ==
=== 2010 House of Representatives bid ===
In 2010 elections, Belmonte ran for second district representative in Quezon City as an independent, but lost to councilor Winnie Castelo and garnered only 105,101 votes.

=== House of Representatives (2013–2022) ===
In 2013 elections, Belmonte ran as representative of the newly created sixth district of Quezon City under the Liberal Party. He was unopposed and eventually served for three consecutive terms.

== Personal life ==
His uncle Feliciano Belmonte Jr., was a former Mayor of Quezon City (2001–2010) and 4th district representative (1992–2001; 2010–2019). His first cousin, Joy Belmonte, is also a Mayor of Quezon City since 2019.

== Electoral history ==
Electoral history of Kit Belmonte
Year	Office	Party		Votes received				Result
Year	Office	Local	National	Total	%	P.	Swing	Result
2010	Representative (Quezon City–2nd)	—N/a	Independent	105,101	30.31%	2nd	—N/a	Lost
2013	Representative (Quezon City–6th)	—N/a	Liberal	78,887	79.45%	1st	—N/a	Unopposed
2016	Representative (Quezon City–6th)	—N/a	Liberal	102,171	77.69%	1st	—N/a	Unopposed
2019	Representative (Quezon City–6th)	SBP	Liberal	94,673	83.1%	1st	—N/a	Won

House of Representatives of the Philippines
Preceded by District established	Representative, 6th District of Quezon City; 2013–2022	Succeeded by Marivic Co-Pilar
Party political offices
Preceded by Teddy Baguilat	Secretary General of the Liberal Party; 2026–present 2016–2022	Incumbent
Preceded by Josephine Sato	Secretary General of the Liberal Party; 2026–present 2016–2022	Succeeded by Teddy Baguilat
