= Lala Sotto =

Filipina politician and MTRCB chairperson

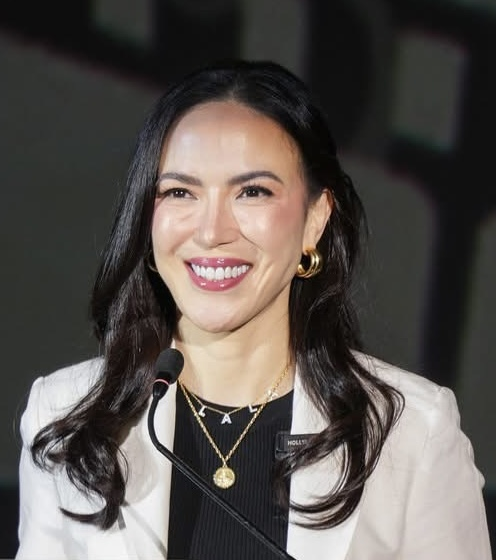
- Sotto in 2025

Chairperson of the Movie and Television Review and Classification Board
- Incumbent
- Assumed office July 7, 2022
- President: Bongbong Marcos
- Preceded by: Jose "Johnny" Revilla

Member of the Quezon City Council
- In office June 30, 2013 – June 30, 2022
- Constituency: 6th district
- In office June 30, 2001 – June 30, 2010
- Constituency: 3rd district

Personal details
- Born: Diorella Maria Gamboa Sotto
- Party: SBP (2018–present)
- Other political affiliations: Liberal (2009–2018); Lakas (2004–2009); LDP (2001–2004)
- Spouses: Vince de Leon (annulled); Mike Antonio
- Children: 2
- Parents: Tito Sotto (father); Helen Gamboa (mother)
- Relatives: Sotto family Sharon Cuneta (cousin); Kiko Pangilinan (cousin-in-law); KC Concepcion (niece); Kakie (niece)
- Occupation: Politician; government official

Diorella Maria "Lala" Gamboa Sotto-Antonio is a Filipina politician and television host who has served as the chairperson of the Movie and Television Review and Classification Board (MTRCB) since July 7, 2022.

== Early life ==
A member of the prominent Sotto family, Lala Sotto is the daughter of television host and politician Tito Sotto and actress and singer Helen Gamboa. She has three siblings: Romina, Gian, and Ciara. She is also a first cousin of actress and singer Sharon Cuneta, whose mother, Elaine, is a sister of Helen. Sotto attended Poveda Learning Center in Quezon City for her early education. She later earned a Bachelor of Arts degree in Consular and Diplomatic Affairs from the De La Salle–College of Saint Benilde in Manila. During her time in college, she became active in student organizations and pursued Spanish studies at Instituto Cervantes, which contributed to her personal growth and interest in public service. She subsequently undertook an executive education program at Harvard Kennedy School.

== Political career (2001–2022) ==
Although Sotto was exposed to politics and public life from an early age, her own interest in public service developed during her college years, where she founded the KASAMA Foundation—a youth-oriented organization that would later grow to include thousands of members. Encouraged by her peers and mentors, she pursued a career in politics, eventually receiving the support of her initially hesitant parents to run for public office.

Sotto was elected as councilor of Quezon City's 3rd district under her father's party, LDP, in the 2001 elections. But in the 2004 elections, she joined Lakas, served from 2004 until 2010, and was elected under the said party.

From 2010 to 2012, Sotto served as her father's chief of staff on the Commission on Appointments.

She was re-elected as Quezon City councilor, representing the 6th district, in the 2013 elections under Mayor Herbert Bautista's Liberal Party slate. She was re-elected in the 2016 and 2019 elections under Vice Mayor (and later Mayor) Joy Belmonte's Serbisyo sa Bayan Party.

Sotto was named as the second nominee of AGAP Partylist in 2022. The party-list only gained one seat in the 19th Congress, occupied by the first nominee Nicanor Briones — a defeat for Sotto.

== MTRCB chairperson (2022–present) ==
President Bongbong Marcos appointed Sotto as the chairperson of the Movie and Television Review and Classification Board (MTRCB) in July 2022, succeeding Johnny Revilla. Sotto's appointment came as a surprise to her. She recalled receiving a call from the Office of the Presidential Management Staff inviting her to the oath-taking ceremony on July 5, 2022, which she was unable to attend due to COVID-19 quarantine protocols. She later officially took her oath on July 7. She noted that before the appointment, she had submitted her curriculum vitae (CV) but was unaware of any formal nomination.

Regarding the MTRCB's jurisdiction over streaming media, Sotto clarified that while the agency currently does not have regulatory authority over digital platforms and social media, it has begun initiating dialogues with companies such as Netflix and Amazon Prime Video. She expressed openness to future legislation that could expand the MTRCB's mandate, stating that the goal is to serve as a "partner parent" in helping Filipino families ensure a safe viewing environment for children.

On July 31, 2023, Sotto summoned television personalities Vice Ganda and Ion Perez to her office following a controversial segment aired on the noontime variety show It's Showtime. The episode in question, broadcast on July 25 via A2Z, GTV, DZOE-TV, and DWDB-TV, featured Vice and Perez in a skit under the segment Isip Bata that allegedly included acts deemed indecent, especially given the presence of child participants. The incident was cited by the MTRCB as potentially violating Section 3(c) of Presidential Decree No. 1986, which empowers the agency to regulate and classify television content. The MTRCB's action drew mixed responses from the public, particularly on social media. Some netizens questioned the impartiality of the summons, pointing out that Sotto did not similarly address a televised incident involving her parents—Tito Sotto and Helen Gamboa—who were seen kissing on the noontime show E.A.T. on TV5, aired on July 29. Images comparing the two incidents circulated online, prompting debates about equal application of regulatory standards. In a radio interview on Cristy Ferminute, Sotto clarified that E.A.T. was not issued a notice to appear before the board because the program's content did not warrant regulatory action. She emphasized that It's Showtime received a summons notice because its segment falls under the Parental Guidance (PG) classification and is broadcast live during noontime hours. Sotto further defended her parents, stating that public displays of affection between them have been consistent throughout their decades-long marriage, both in private and during television appearances since the early years of programs like Iskul Bukol and the original Eat Bulaga! She maintained that such behavior is characteristic of their relationship and long-standing public image. She also reiterated her position as MTRCB chair, asserting that her decisions regarding both It's Showtime and E.A.T. were made in accordance with established content standards and classification guidelines, not personal affiliations or public pressure. Social media users expressed a range of opinions. Some defended Vice and Perez, suggesting the act was innocuous and open to interpretation. Others supported Sotto's assertion on the consistent enforcement of regulations regardless of the individuals involved, calling on the MTRCB to continue upholding its mandate fairly. Supporters of the summons emphasized the importance of appropriateness, particularly in content intended for children, while some extended the conversation to include calls for regulating online and social media content that they felt also displayed indecent material.

In 2024, she gave a rare X rating to the Filipino independent film Dear Satan, starring Paolo Contis. Sotto, who viewed the film herself, stated that allowing the film to be publicly screened was against her Christian belief since it depicts Satan as a "redeemable character".

On May 22, 2025, President Marcos ordered members of his cabinet (and officials of similar rank) to tender their courtesy resignations following the results of the May 12, 2025, midterm elections. Sotto complied with this order the following day. She will continue to serve as MTRCB chair until the President accepts her resignation, if he does so.

== Personal life ==
Sotto is currently married to Mike Antonio with whom she has two children: a daughter named Helena and a son named Marciano. According to The Philippine Star, she was previously married to Vince de Leon (son of businessman Jun de Leon), whom she met during her time as a student at De La Salle–College of Saint Benilde.
