= 2013 Quezon City local elections =

16th Mayoral elections in Quezon City

2013 Quezon City mayoral election
- May 13, 2013
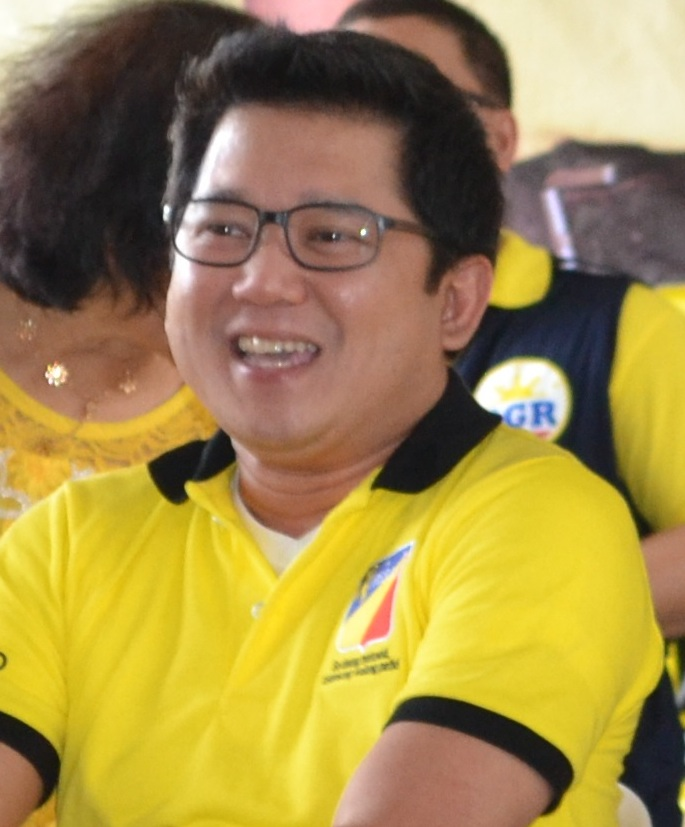
| Nominee | Herbert Bautista | John Charles Chang | Henry Samonte |
| Party | Liberal | Independent | Independent |
| Running mate | Joy Belmonte | Rolando Jota |
| Popular vote | 542,214 | 53,272 | 24,051 |
| Percentage | 77.85 | 7.65 | 3.45 |
Mayor before election
Herbert Bautista
Liberal
Elected Mayor
Herbert Bautista
Liberal

Local elections were held in Quezon City on May 13, 2013, within the Philippine general election. Registered voters of the city elected candidates for the following elective local posts: mayor, vice mayor, district representative, and six councilors at-large for each district.

Like in the previous election, Mayor Herbert Bautista and his running mate Vice Mayor Joy Belmonte of the Liberal Party garnered huge leads over their rivals. Candidates of the Liberal Party won all the congressional seats in the city.

== Mayoral election results ==
Herbert Bautista is the incumbent. Romeo Acebedo was disqualified by the COMELEC for being a nuisance candidate.

Quezon City mayoral election
| Party | Candidate | Votes | % |
|---|---|---|---|
| Liberal | Herbert Bautista | 542,214 | 77.85 |
| Independent | John Charles Chang | 53,272 | 7.65 |
| Independent | Henry Samonte | 24,051 | 3.45 |
| Margin of victory | | 488,942 | 70.20 |
| Valid ballots | | 619,537 | 88.95 |
| Invalid or blank votes | | 76,988 | 11.05 |
| Total votes | | 696,525 | 100 |
| Liberal hold | | | |

Notes:

- Chang is also affiliated with his local party Better QC and is belatedly nominated by the Ang Kapatiran; he is indicated as an independent on the ballot.

== Vice Mayoral election results ==
Josefina Belmonte is the incumbent. Allan Bantilo and Fermin Idea were disqualified by the COMELEC for being nuisance candidates.

Quezon City vice mayoral election
| Party | Candidate | Votes | % |
|---|---|---|---|
| Liberal | Joy Belmonte | 546,707 | 78.49 |
| Independent | Rolando Jota | 38,299 | 5.50 |
| Margin of victory | | 508,408 | 72.99 |
| Valid ballots | | 585,006 | 83.99 |
| Invalid or blank votes | | 111,519 | 16.01 |
| Total votes | | 696,525 | 100 |
| Liberal hold | | | |

Notes:

- Jota is also affiliated with the local party Better QC and is belatedly nominated by the Ang Kapatiran; he is indicated as an independent on the ballot.

== House of Representative Elections ==
=== 1st District ===
Incumbent Vincent "Bingbong" Crisologo is on his last term, having served as Representative of the 1st District from 2004 to 2013. His wife Rita is his party's nominee. However, she lost to Councilor Francisco Calalay.

2013 Philippine House of Representatives election at Quezon City's 1st district
| Party | Candidate | Votes | % |
|---|---|---|---|
| Liberal | Francisco Calalay | 62,226 | 47.70 |
| UNA | Rita Crisologo | 56,604 | 43.39 |
| Independent | Gary Jamile | 2,095 | 1.60 |
| Margin of victory | | 5,622 | 4.31% |
| Valid ballots | | 120,925 | 92.70 |
| Invalid or blank votes | | 9,529 | 7.30 |
| Total votes | | 130,454 | 100.00 |
| Liberal gain from UNA | | | |

=== 2nd District ===
The second district of Quezon City was redistricted into three districts. The district that will continue to carry the "second district" name is the one surrounding the Batasang Pambansa Complex, immediately south of the La Mesa Dam watershed.

Winston Castelo, the incumbent 2nd district representative, is running here.

2013 Philippine House of Representatives election at Quezon City's 2nd district
| Party | Candidate | Votes | % |
|---|---|---|---|
| Liberal | Winston Castelo | 76,562 | 56.47 |
| Independent | Ismael Mathay III | 44,043 | 32.49 |
| Margin of victory | | 32,519 | 23.99% |
| Valid ballots | | 120,605 | 88.96 |
| Invalid or blank votes | | 14,969 | 11.04 |
| Total votes | | 135,574 | 100.00 |
| Liberal hold | | | |

=== 3rd District ===
Jorge Banal, Jr. is the incumbent, his opponent is former congressman Matias Defensor Jr.

2013 Philippine House of Representatives election at Quezon City's 3rd district
| Party | Candidate | Votes | % |
|---|---|---|---|
| Liberal | Jorge Banal, Jr. | 48,822 | 52.05 |
| UNA | Matias Defensor Jr. | 38,909 | 41.48 |
| Margin of victory | | 9,913 | 10.57% |
| Valid ballots | | 87,731 | 93.54 |
| Invalid or blank votes | | 6,062 | 6.46 |
| Total votes | | 93,793 | |
| Liberal hold | | | |

=== 4th District ===
Feliciano Belmonte, Jr., the Speaker of the House of Representatives, is the incumbent.

2013 Philippine House of Representatives election at Quezon City's 4th district
| Party | Candidate | Votes | % |
|---|---|---|---|
| Liberal | Feliciano Belmonte, Jr. | 93,888 | 76.64 |
| PMP | Hans Palacios | 9,447 | 7.71 |
| Margin of victory | | 84,441 | 68.93% |
| Valid ballots | | 103,335 | 84.35 |
| Invalid or blank votes | | 19,167 | 15.65 |
| Total votes | | 122,502 | 100.00 |
| Liberal hold | | | |

=== 5th District ===
The 5th district comes from old 2nd district's northernmost area, comprising most of Novaliches.

Actor and councilor Alfred Vargas won against former representatives Mary Ann Susano and Dante Liban and broadcaster Gani Oro.

2013 Philippine House of Representatives election at Quezon City's 5th district
| Party | Candidate | Votes | % |
|---|---|---|---|
| Liberal | Alfred Vargas | 64,701 | 56.29 |
| KKK | Mary Ann Susano | 24,819 | 21.59 |
| UNA | Dante Liban | 10,563 | 9.19 |
| Aksyon | Isagani Oro | 4,495 | 3.91 |
| Margin of victory | | 39,882 | 34.70% |
| Valid ballots | | 104,578 | 90.98 |
| Invalid or blank votes | | 10,369 | 9.02 |
| Total votes | | 114,947 | 100.00 |
| Liberal win (new seat) | | | |

=== 6th District ===
The 6th district comprises the old 2nd district's southernmost parts (Balintawak and Tandang Sora areas). Lawyer Christopher "Kit" Belmonte, who ranked second to Winston Castelo in the 2010 polls), is running unopposed.

2013 Philippine House of Representatives election at Quezon City's 6th district
| Party | Candidate | Votes | % |
|---|---|---|---|
| Liberal | Christopher Belmonte | 78,887 | 79.45 |
| Valid ballots | | 78,887 | 79.45 |
| Invalid or blank votes | | 20,368 | 20.52 |
| Total votes | | 99,255 | 100.00 |
| Liberal win (new seat) | | | |

== City Council elections ==
=== Summary ===
| Party | Mayoral/vice mayoral candidate | Total votes | | Total seats | |
| Party | Mayoral/vice mayoral candidate | Total | % | Total | % |
|---|---|---|---|---|---|
| Liberal | Herbert Bautista | 1,768,381 | 53.78% | 27 | 71.1% |
| UNA | none | 422,578 | 12.85% | 2 | 5.3% |
| NPC | none | 192,412 | 5.85% | 2 | 5.3% |
| PDP–Laban | none | 168,035 | 5.11% | 1 | 2.6% |
| Nacionalista | none | 87,796 | 2.67% | 1 | 2.6% |
| LDP | none | 47,342 | 1.44% | 0 | 0.0% |
| KKK | none | 47,082 | 1.43% | 0 | 0.0% |
| PMP | none | 45,680 | 1.39% | 0 | 0.0% |
| PLM | none | 44,820 | 1.36% | 0 | 0.0% |
| Makabayan | none | 17,112 | 0.52% | 0 | 0.0% |
| Independent | various | 446,836 | 13.59% | 3 | 7.9% |
| Total valid votes cast | | 3,288,074 | N/A | | |
| Total turnout | | 696,525 | 100.00% | | |
| Total partisan seats | | | | 36 | 94.7% |
| Seat for Association of Barangay Captains President | | | | 1 | 2.6% |
| Seat for Association of Sangguniang Kabataan chairmen President | | | | 1 | 2.6% |
| Total non-partisan seats | | | | 2 | 5.3% |
| Total seats | | | | 38 | 100.0% |

=== District 1 ===
City Council election at Quezon City's 1st district
| Party | Candidate | Votes | % |
|---|---|---|---|
| UNA | Anthony "Onyx" Crisologo | 82,326 | 13.31 |
| Liberal | RJ Belmonte | 75,327 | 12.18 |
| NPC | Dorothy Delarmente | 72,650 | 11.74 |
| Liberal | Lena Marie Juico | 67,472 | 10.91 |
| Liberal | Victor Ferrer Jr. | 65,805 | 10.64 |
| Liberal | Alex Herrera | 64,443 | 10.42 |
| UNA | Von Yalong | 41,550 | 6.72 |
| UNA | Fermin Bilaos | 38,289 | 6.19 |
| UNA | Jennifer Calalay | 37,393 | 6.04 |
| Liberal | Linda Madrilejo | 36,670 | 5.93 |
| UNA | Junn Sta. Maria | 21,215 | 3.43 |
| PDP–Laban | Pao Fortuno | 7,636 | 1.23 |
| Independent | Sonny Argales | 5,006 | 0.81 |
| Independent | Nap Lipana | 2,834 | 0.46 |
| Total votes | | 130,454 | 100.00 |

=== District 2 ===
City Council election at Quezon City's 2nd district
| Party | Candidate | Votes | % |
|---|---|---|---|
| Liberal | Precious Castelo | 89,019 | 13.80 |
| Liberal | Bong Liban | 83,212 | 12.90 |
| Independent | Roderick Paulate | 74,432 | 11.54 |
| Liberal | Ranulfo Ludovica | 68,895 | 10.68 |
| Liberal | Ramon Medalla | 61,513 | 9.53 |
| Liberal | Estrella Valmocina | 57,080 | 8.85 |
| UNA | Al Herrera Tolome | 53,114 | 8.23 |
| NPC | Olyn Therese Medina | 48,433 | 7.51 |
| PDP–Laban | Resty Malangen | 32,343 | 5.01 |
| Independent | Rosario Dadulo | 20,939 | 3.25 |
| Independent | Jose Gaviola | 16,397 | 2.54 |
| UNA | Cheekee Liban | 13,720 | 2.13 |
| Independent | Direk Tarca | 6,882 | 1.07 |
| PMP | Visaya Denosta | 4,537 | 0.70 |
| PMP | Joseph Arias | 4,271 | 0.66 |
| Independent | Boy Borja | 2,730 | 0.42 |
| Independent | Vicente Madero | 2,419 | 0.37 |
| Independent | Ginalyn Mozar | 2,275 | 0.35 |
| Independent | Napoleon Matabalan | 1,613 | 0.25 |
| Independent | Alex Lague | 1,329 | 0.21 |
| Total votes | | 135,574 | 100.00 |

=== District 3 ===
City Council election at Quezon City's 3rd district
| Party | Candidate | Votes | % |
|---|---|---|---|
| Liberal | Allan Benedict Reyes | 56,480 | 12.86 |
| Liberal | Gian Sotto | 53,260 | 12.12 |
| NPC | Franz Pumaren | 52,750 | 12.01 |
| Nacionalista | Pinggoy Lagumbay | 46,191 | 10.51 |
| PDP–Laban | Don De Leon | 45,691 | 10.40 |
| Liberal | Jaime Borres | 45,066 | 10.26 |
| Liberal | Julian Coseteng | 43,204 | 9.83 |
| UNA | Dante De Guzman | 34,697 | 7.90 |
| PMP | Dominic Flores | 26,729 | 6.08 |
| Independent | Anthony Castelo | 19,465 | 4.43 |
| PDP–Laban | Baby Gaba | 6,073 | 1.38 |
| Independent | Baltazar Catbagan | 4,910 | 1.12 |
| Independent | Henry Cruz | 2,498 | 0.57 |
| Makabayan | Raymundo Carlos | 2,329 | 0.53 |
| Total votes | | 93,793 | 100.00 |

=== District 4 ===
City Council election at Quezon City's 4th district
| Party | Candidate | Votes | % |
|---|---|---|---|
| NPC | Bong Suntay | 74,184 | 13.09 |
| Liberal | Marvin Rillo | 70,290 | 12.41 |
| Liberal | Vincent Belmonte | 69,685 | 12.30 |
| Liberal | Raquel Malangen | 65,507 | 11.56 |
| Liberal | Jessica Daza | 63,499 | 11.21 |
| Liberal | Bayani Hipol | 48,231 | 8.51 |
| LDP | Janet Malaya | 47,342 | 8.36 |
| PLM | Dante Josef Lagman | 44,820 | 7.91 |
| Independent | Ramon Mathay | 35,942 | 6.26 |
| KKK | Antonio Inton Jr. | 27,413 | 4.84 |
| Independent | Anthony Pacheo | 8,811 | 1.56 |
| Independent | James Ibanez | 4,460 | 0.79 |
| Independent | William Garcia | 3,944 | 0.70 |
| Independent | Felix Mopas | 2,846 | 0.50 |
| Total votes | | 122,502 | 100.00 |

=== District 5 ===
City Council election at Quezon City's 5th district
| Party | Candidate | Votes | % |
|---|---|---|---|
| Independent | Joe Visaya | 61,223 | 11.28 |
| Liberal | Julienne Alyson Rae Medalla | 54,287 | 10.00 |
| Liberal | Godie Liban | 49,134 | 9.05 |
| UNA | Anjo Yllana | 45,570 | 8.39 |
| Liberal | Allan Francisco | 44,109 | 8.12 |
| Liberal | Karl Edgar Castelo | 42,749 | 7.87 |
| Liberal | Eric Medina | 36,480 | 6.72 |
| Liberal | Lito Bernardino | 30,920 | 5.69 |
| Independent | Enrico Serrano | 21,288 | 3.92 |
| NPC | Ismael Mathay IV | 18,579 | 3.42 |
| UNA | Michelle Umali | 18,564 | 3.42 |
| UNA | Alice Herrera | 15,131 | 2.79 |
| PDP–Laban | Ann Tobias | 12,844 | 2.37 |
| Independent | Rey Miranda | 12,761 | 2.35 |
| Makabayan | Chona Rellosa | 11,467 | 2.11 |
| Independent | Jesus Dungca | 9,588 | 1.77 |
| PDP–Laban | Dok Go Go | 9,367 | 1.73 |
| KKK | Tintin Fider | 8,785 | 1.62 |
| UNA | Arnold Francisco | 7,757 | 1.43 |
| PMP | Baby Liban | 6,020 | 1.11 |
| KKK | Nilo Biglang-Awa | 5,927 | 1.09 |
| UNA | Aileen Papin | 4,348 | 0.80 |
| PMP | Jerwin Ejercito | 4,123 | 0.76 |
| Independent | Francis Camacho | 2,778 | 0.51 |
| Independent | Nicanor John Reyes IV | 2,563 | 0.47 |
| Independent | Dan Alvaro Galura | 1,579 | 0.29 |
| Independent | Roy Bustamante | 1,447 | 0.27 |
| Independent | Pepe Leguarda | 977 | 0.18 |
| Independent | Walter Jimenez | 904 | 0.17 |
| Independent | Susy Gaspar | 866 | 0.16 |
| KKK | Zeny Montellano | 831 | 0.15 |
| Total votes | | 114,947 | 100.00 |

=== District 6 ===
City Council election at Quezon City's 6th district
| Party | Candidate | Votes | % |
|---|---|---|---|
| Liberal | Candy Medina | 58,474 | 12.33 |
| Liberal | Lala Sotto | 56,309 | 11.87 |
| Liberal | Marivic Co-Pilar | 55,421 | 11.68 |
| Liberal | Roger Juan | 53,926 | 11.23 |
| Liberal | Bobby Castelo | 53,064 | 11.19 |
| Liberal | Donny Matias | 48,850 | 10.30 |
| Nacionalista | Rhea Herrera | 41,605 | 8.77 |
| PDP–Laban | Ellen Aquino | 25,411 | 5.36 |
| Independent | Allan Robes | 16,225 | 3.42 |
| PDP–Laban | Reggie Planas | 13,740 | 2.90 |
| PDP–Laban | Andrew San Diego | 12,830 | 2.70 |
| UNA | Drew Liban | 8,904 | 1.88 |
| Independent | Heber Bartolome | 8,738 | 1.84 |
| Independent | Sotero Vargas | 5,888 | 1.24 |
| KKK | Robert Sombillo | 4,126 | 0.87 |
| Makabayan | Leon Peralta | 3,316 | 0.70 |
| Independent | Mico Lagman | 2,743 | 0.58 |
| Independent | Halil Mapandi | 1,797 | 0.38 |
| Independent | Ariel Uy | 1,555 | 0.33 |
| PDP–Laban | Bernard Sapitula | 1,137 | 0.24 |
| PDP–Laban | Fred Espinola | 963 | 0.20 |
| Total votes | | 99,255 | 100.00 |
