= Mayor of Quezon City =

Local chief executive of Quezon City, Philippines

- Punong Lungsod ng Quezon
- Seal of the Mayor of Quezon City

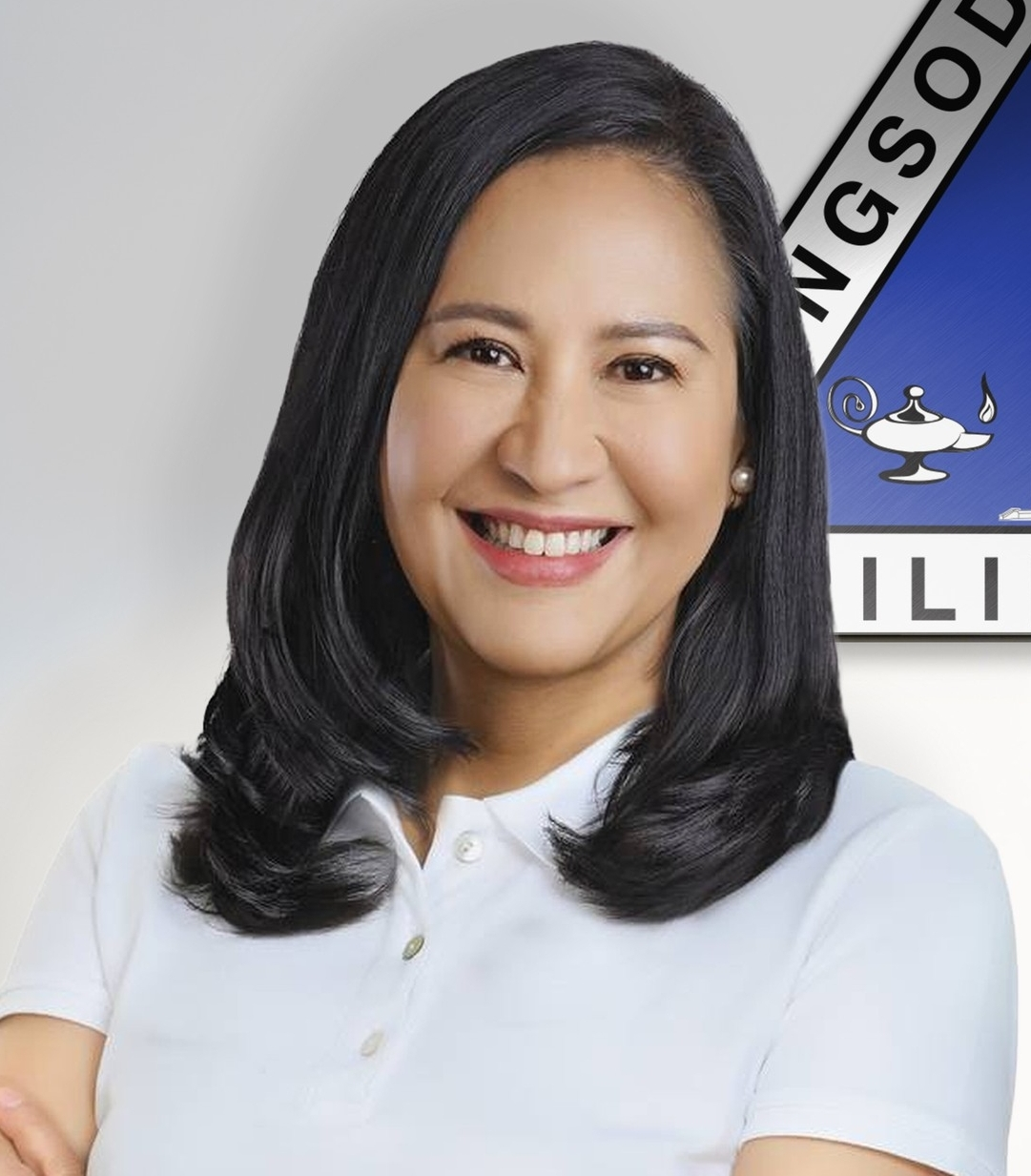
- Incumbent; Joy Belmonte since June 30, 2019
- Style: The Honorable (formal)
- Seat: Quezon City Hall, Brgy. Central
- Appointer: Elected via popular vote
- Term length: 3 years, maximum three consecutive terms
- Inaugural holder: Manuel L. Quezon
- Formation: October 12, 1939
- First holder: Tomas Morato
- Website: Office of the Mayor of Quezon City

The mayor of Quezon City (Filipino: Punong Lungsod ng Quezon) is the head of the executive branch of Quezon City's government. The mayor holds office at the Quezon City Hall.

Like all local government heads in the Philippines, the mayor is elected via popular vote, and may not be elected for a fourth consecutive term (although the former mayor may return to office after an interval of one term). In case of death, resignation or incapacity, the vice mayor becomes the mayor.

Until 1951, the Mayor of Quezon City was appointed by the President of the Philippines. Through Republic Act No. 537 signed by President Elpidio Quirino on June 16, 1950, Quezon City had its first mayoralty election on November 13, 1951.

== List of mayors ==
No.	Portrait	Name (lifespan)	Term	Party	Election	Vice mayor	Era
Acting		Manuel L. Quezon (1878–1944)	October 12, 1939 – November 4, 1939	Nacionalista	—	Vicente Fragante	Commonwealth
1		Tomas Morato (1887–1965)	October 23, 1939 (Note: Appointed ad interim mayor by President Manuel L. Quezon effective October 23, 1939, but his appointment paper was signed by Quezon on November 10, 1939 showed the effective date from October 12, 1939) – July 19, 1942 (Note: Arrested by the Japanese forces during their occupation.)	Nacionalista	—	Ponciano Bernardo	Commonwealth
Acting		Jorge B. Vargas (1890–1980) (Note: Mayor of the City of Greater Manila which included Quezon City.)	December 24, 1941 – January 27, 1942	Nacionalista (until 1942)	—	None	Commonwealth
Acting		Jorge B. Vargas (1890–1980)	December 24, 1941 – January 27, 1942	KALIBAPI (from 1942)	—	None	Second Republic
Acting		León Guinto (1886–1962)	January 27, 1942 – July 17, 1944	KALIBAPI	—	None	Second Republic
2		Ponciano Bernardo (1905–1949)	December 24, 1946 – April 28, 1949 (Note: Died in office.)	Independent	—	Matias Defensor Sr. (until 1947)	Third Republic
2		Ponciano Bernardo (1905–1949)	December 24, 1946 – April 28, 1949	Independent	—	Gregorio B. Roxas (from 1948)	Third Republic
3 (Acting)		Nicanor A. Roxas (1899–1970)	April 28, 1949 – January 6, 1950	Liberal	—	Francisco P. Batacan	Third Republic
4		Ignacio Santos-Diaz	January 6, 1950 – December 30, 1953	Liberal	—	Luis Sianghio	Third Republic
5		Norberto S. Amoranto (1908–1979)	January 1, 1954 – March 30, 1976 (Note: Resigned.)	Nacionalista	—	Ysidro Guevarra	Third Republic
5		Norberto S. Amoranto (1908–1979)	January 1, 1954 – March 30, 1976	Nacionalista	1959	Vicente Novales	Third Republic
5		Norberto S. Amoranto (1908–1979)	January 1, 1954 – March 30, 1976	Nacionalista	1963	Mariano Sta. Romana	Third Republic
5		Norberto S. Amoranto (1908–1979)	January 1, 1954 – March 30, 1976	Nacionalista	1967	Mel Mathay	Third Republic
5		Norberto S. Amoranto (1908–1979)	January 1, 1954 – March 30, 1976	Nacionalista	1971	Carlos Albert	Third Republic
5		Norberto S. Amoranto (1908–1979)	January 1, 1954 – March 30, 1976	Nacionalista	1971	Carlos Albert	Martial law
5		Norberto S. Amoranto (1908–1979)	January 1, 1954 – March 30, 1976	Nacionalista	—	Ronald Kookooritchkin (until 1976)	Martial law
6		Adelina Rodriguez (1920–2021)	April 1, 1976 – April 14, 1986	Nacionalista	—	Ronald Kookooritchkin (from 1976)	Martial law
6		Adelina Rodriguez (1920–2021)	April 1, 1976 – April 14, 1986	KBL (from 1980)	1980	Stephen Sarino	Martial law
6		Adelina Rodriguez (1920–2021)	April 1, 1976 – April 14, 1986	KBL (from 1980)	1980	Stephen Sarino	Fourth Republic
6		Adelina Rodriguez (1920–2021)	April 1, 1976 – April 14, 1986	KBL (from 1980)	1980	Stephen Sarino	Provisional Government
7 (Acting)		Brigido Simon Jr. (born 1952)	April 20, 1986 – November 30, 1987	Independent	—	Elmer Pormento	Provisional Government
7 (Acting)		Brigido Simon Jr. (born 1952)	April 20, 1986 – November 30, 1987	Independent	—	Elmer Pormento	Fifth Republic
Acting		Reynaldo Bernardo	December 5, 1987 – December 7, 1987	Independent	—	Elmer Pormento	Fifth Republic
Acting		Elmer Pormento	December 7, 1987 – January 29, 1988 (Note: Dismissed by the Department of the Interior and Local Government.)	Independent	—	Amado Zabala	Fifth Republic
Acting		Leoncio de Pedro	January 29, 1988 – February 2, 1988	Independent	—	Amado Zabala	Fifth Republic
8		Brigido Simon Jr. (born 1952)	February 2, 1988 – June 30, 1992	LDP (until 1992)	1988	Tito Sotto (until 1992)	Fifth Republic
8		Brigido Simon Jr. (born 1952)	February 2, 1988 – June 30, 1992	LDP (until 1992)	1988	Alicia Herrera (from 1992)	Fifth Republic
8		Brigido Simon Jr. (born 1952)	February 2, 1988 – June 30, 1992	PRP (from 1992)	1988	Alicia Herrera (from 1992)	Fifth Republic
9		Mel Mathay (1932–2013)	June 30, 1992 – June 30, 2001	Independent (until 1998)	1992	Charito Planas	Fifth Republic
9		Mel Mathay (1932–2013)	June 30, 1992 – June 30, 2001	Independent (until 1998)	1995	Herbert Bautista (until 1998)	Fifth Republic
9		Mel Mathay (1932–2013)	June 30, 1992 – June 30, 2001	Independent (until 1998)	1995	Jorge Banal (1998)	Fifth Republic
9		Mel Mathay (1932–2013)	June 30, 1992 – June 30, 2001	Lakas (1998)	1998	Fe Consuelo Angeles	Fifth Republic
9		Mel Mathay (1932–2013)	June 30, 1992 – June 30, 2001	Independent (from 1998)	1998	Fe Consuelo Angeles	Fifth Republic
10		Feliciano Belmonte Jr. (born 1936)	June 30, 2001 – June 30, 2010	Lakas (until 2009)	2001	Herbert Bautista	Fifth Republic
10		Feliciano Belmonte Jr. (born 1936)	June 30, 2001 – June 30, 2010	Lakas (until 2009)	2004	Herbert Bautista	Fifth Republic
10		Feliciano Belmonte Jr. (born 1936)	June 30, 2001 – June 30, 2010	Lakas (until 2009)	2007	Herbert Bautista	Fifth Republic
10		Feliciano Belmonte Jr. (born 1936)	June 30, 2001 – June 30, 2010	Liberal (from 2009)	2007	Herbert Bautista	Fifth Republic
11		Herbert Bautista (born 1968)	June 30, 2010 – June 30, 2019	Liberal (until 2017)	2010	Joy Belmonte	Fifth Republic
11		Herbert Bautista (born 1968)	June 30, 2010 – June 30, 2019	Liberal (until 2017)	2013	Joy Belmonte	Fifth Republic
11		Herbert Bautista (born 1968)	June 30, 2010 – June 30, 2019	Liberal (until 2017)	2016	Joy Belmonte	Fifth Republic
11		Herbert Bautista (born 1968)	June 30, 2010 – June 30, 2019	PDP–Laban (2017)	2016	Joy Belmonte	Fifth Republic
11		Herbert Bautista (born 1968)	June 30, 2010 – June 30, 2019	NPC (from 2017)	2016	Joy Belmonte	Fifth Republic
12		Joy Belmonte (born 1970)	June 30, 2019 – present	SBP	2019	Gian Sotto	Fifth Republic
12		Joy Belmonte (born 1970)	June 30, 2019 – present	SBP	2022	Gian Sotto	Fifth Republic
12		Joy Belmonte (born 1970)	June 30, 2019 – present	SBP	2025	Gian Sotto	Fifth Republic

== Vice Mayor of Quezon City ==
Vice Mayor of Quezon City
- Pangalawang Punong Lungsod ng Quezon
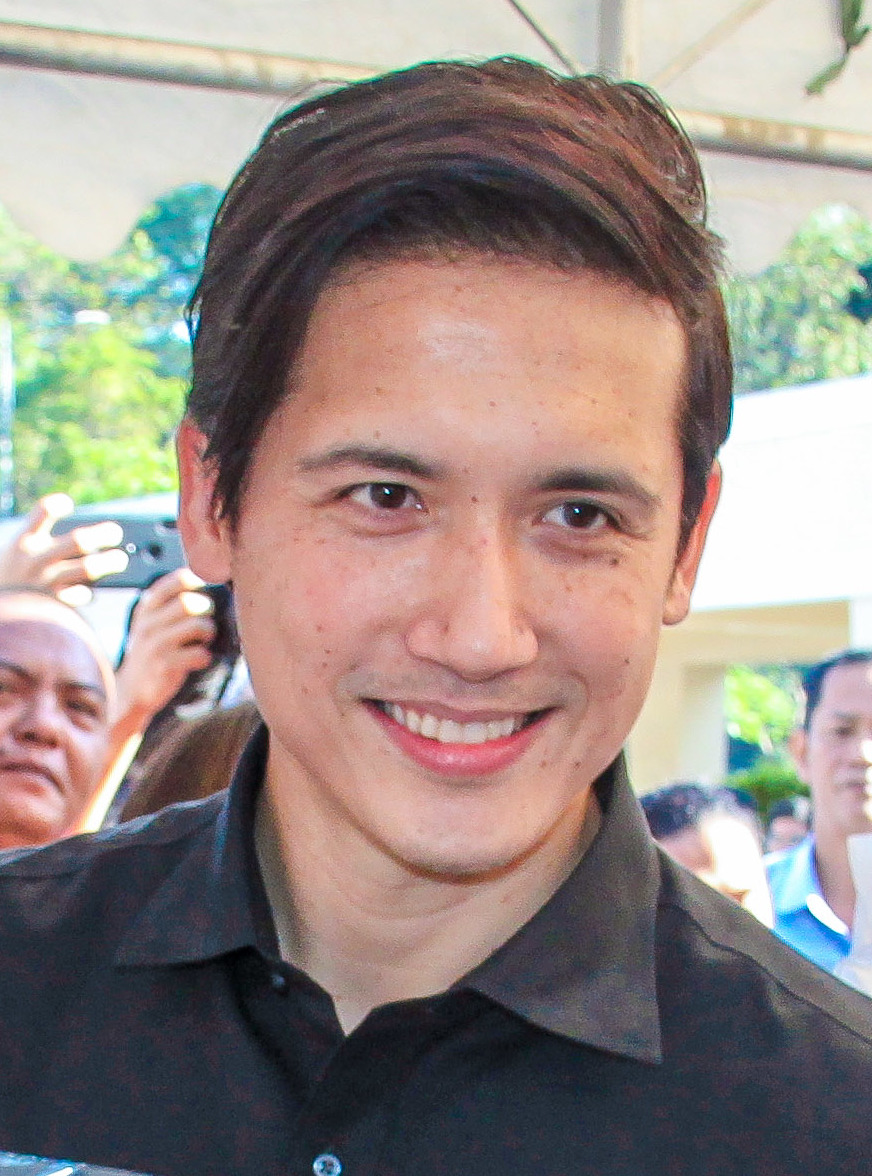
- Incumbent; Gian Sotto since June 30, 2019
- Style: The Honorable (formal)
- Appointer: Elected via popular vote
- Term length: 3 years, maximum three consecutive terms
- Inaugural holder: Vicente Fragante
- Formation: November 10, 1939
- First holder: Ponciano Bernardo

The vice mayor is the second-highest official in the city. The vice mayor is elected via popular vote; although most mayoral candidates have running mates, the vice mayor is elected separately from the mayor. This can result in the mayor and the vice mayor coming from different political parties.

The vice mayor is the presiding officer of the Quezon City Council. The vice mayor can only vote as the tiebreaker. When a mayor is removed from office, the vice mayor becomes the mayor until the scheduled next election.

=== List of vice mayors ===
No.	Portrait	Name (lifespan)	Term	Party	Election	Mayor	Era
Acting		Vicente Fragante	October 12, 1939 – November 10, 1939	Independent	—	Manuel L. Quezon	Commonwealth
1		Ponciano Bernardo	November 10, 1939 – July 19, 1942	Independent	—	Tomas Morato	Commonwealth
None			July 19, 1942 – December 24, 1946	—	—	Jorge B. Vargas	Commonwealth
None			July 19, 1942 – December 24, 1946	—	—	Jorge B. Vargas	Second Republic
None			July 19, 1942 – December 24, 1946	—	—	León Guinto	Second Republic
2		Matias Defensor Sr.	December 24, 1946 – December 30, 1947	Independent	—	Ponciano Bernardo	Third Republic
3		Gregorio B. Roxas	January 1, 1948 – April 28, 1949	Independent	—	Ponciano Bernardo	Third Republic
Acting		Francisco P. Batacan	September 9, 1949 – December 30, 1949	Independent	—	Nicanor A. Roxas	Third Republic
4		Luis Sianghio	January 6, 1950 – December 30, 1953	Independent	—	Ignacio Santos-Diaz	Third Republic
5		Ysidro Guevarra	January 1, 1954 – December 30, 1959	Independent	—	Norberto S. Amoranto	Third Republic
6		Vicente Novales	January 1, 1960 – December 30, 1963	Nacionalista	1959	Norberto S. Amoranto	Third Republic
7		Mariano Sta. Romana	January 1, 1964 – December 30, 1967	Nacionalista	1963	Norberto S. Amoranto	Third Republic
8		Mel Mathay (1932–2013)	January 1, 1968 – December 30, 1971	Nacionalista	1967	Norberto S. Amoranto	Third Republic
9		Carlos L. Albert	January 1, 1972 – December 30, 1975	CLGG–Liberal	1971	Norberto S. Amoranto	Third Republic
9		Carlos L. Albert	January 1, 1972 – December 30, 1975	CLGG–Liberal	1971	Norberto S. Amoranto	Martial law
10		Ronald Kookooritchkin	January 1, 1976 – January 30, 1980	Unknown	—	Norberto S. Amoranto	Martial law
10		Ronald Kookooritchkin	January 1, 1976 – January 30, 1980	Unknown	—	Adelina Rodriguez	Martial law
11		Stephen Sarino	January 30, 1980 – April 14, 1986	KBL	1980	Adelina Rodriguez	Martial law
11		Stephen Sarino	January 30, 1980 – April 14, 1986	KBL	1980	Adelina Rodriguez	Fourth Republic
11		Stephen Sarino	January 30, 1980 – April 14, 1986	KBL	1980	Adelina Rodriguez	Provisional Government
Acting		Elmer Pormento	April 20, 1986 – December 7, 1987	Independent	—	Brigido Simon Jr.	Provisional Government
Acting		Elmer Pormento	April 20, 1986 – December 7, 1987	Independent	—	Brigido Simon Jr.	Fifth Republic
Acting		Elmer Pormento	April 20, 1986 – December 7, 1987	Independent	—	Reynaldo Bernardo	Fifth Republic
Acting		Amado Zabala	December 8, 1987 – February 1, 1988	Independent	—	Elmer Pormento	Fifth Republic
Acting		Amado Zabala	December 8, 1987 – February 1, 1988	Independent	—	Leoncio de Pedro	Fifth Republic
12		Tito Sotto (born 1948)	February 2, 1988 – January 1, 1992	LDP	1988	Brigido Simon Jr.	Fifth Republic
Acting		Alicia Herrera	January 1, 1992 – June 30, 1992	Unknown	—	Brigido Simon Jr.	Fifth Republic
13		Charito Planas (1930–2017)	June 30, 1992 – January 23, 1995	Unknown	1992	Mel Mathay	Fifth Republic
14		Herbert Bautista (born 1968)	January 24, 1995 – April 6, 1998	NPC (until 1995)	—	Mel Mathay	Fifth Republic
14		Herbert Bautista (born 1968)	January 24, 1995 – April 6, 1998	LDP (from 1995)	1995	Mel Mathay	Fifth Republic
Acting		Jorge Banal	April 7, 1998 – June 30, 1998	Unknown	—	Mel Mathay	Fifth Republic
15		Connie Angeles	June 30, 1998 – June 30, 2001	Lakas	1998	Mel Mathay	Fifth Republic
16		Herbert Bautista (born 1968)	June 30, 2001 – June 30, 2010	LDP (until 2002)	2001	Feliciano Belmonte Jr.	Fifth Republic
16		Herbert Bautista (born 1968)	June 30, 2001 – June 30, 2010	Lakas (2002–2009)	2001	Feliciano Belmonte Jr.	Fifth Republic
16		Herbert Bautista (born 1968)	June 30, 2001 – June 30, 2010	Lakas (2002–2009)	2004	Feliciano Belmonte Jr.	Fifth Republic
16		Herbert Bautista (born 1968)	June 30, 2001 – June 30, 2010	Lakas (2002–2009)	2007	Feliciano Belmonte Jr.	Fifth Republic
16		Herbert Bautista (born 1968)	June 30, 2001 – June 30, 2010	Liberal (from 2009)	2007	Feliciano Belmonte Jr.	Fifth Republic
17		Joy Belmonte (born 1970)	June 30, 2010 – June 30, 2019	Liberal (until 2017)	2010	Herbert Bautista	Fifth Republic
17		Joy Belmonte (born 1970)	June 30, 2010 – June 30, 2019	Liberal (until 2017)	2013	Herbert Bautista	Fifth Republic
17		Joy Belmonte (born 1970)	June 30, 2010 – June 30, 2019	Liberal (until 2017)	2016	Herbert Bautista	Fifth Republic
17		Joy Belmonte (born 1970)	June 30, 2010 – June 30, 2019	PDP–Laban (2017–2018)	2016	Herbert Bautista	Fifth Republic
17		Joy Belmonte (born 1970)	June 30, 2010 – June 30, 2019	SBP (from 2018)	2016	Herbert Bautista	Fifth Republic
18		Gian Sotto (born 1978)	June 30, 2019 – present	SBP	2019	Joy Belmonte	Fifth Republic
18		Gian Sotto (born 1978)	June 30, 2019 – present	SBP	2022	Joy Belmonte	Fifth Republic
18		Gian Sotto (born 1978)	June 30, 2019 – present	SBP	2025	Joy Belmonte	Fifth Republic

== Sources ==
- Sangguniang Panlungsod of Quezon City
- "QC: A Saga of Continuing Progress". Quezonian Newsletter. Quezon City Public Library. 2007. Archived from the original on September 24, 2015.
