= Vincent Crisologo =

Filipino politician

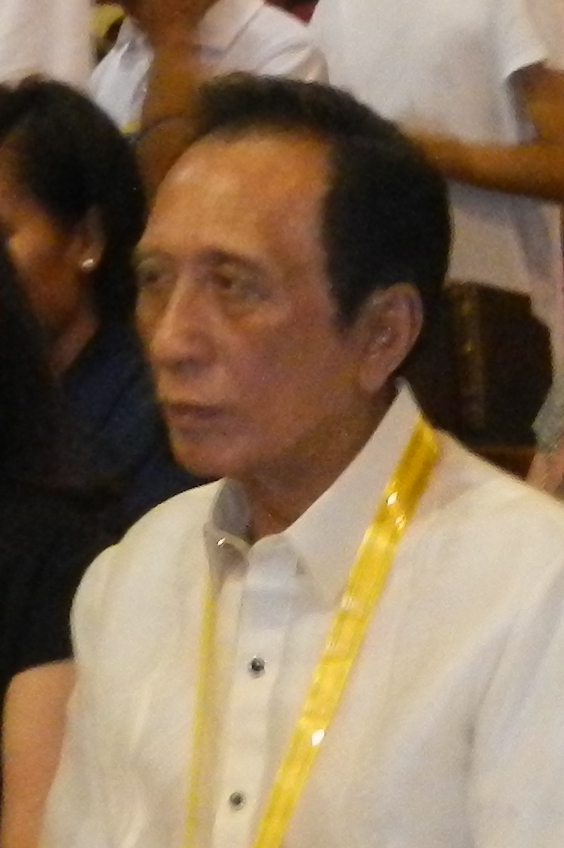
- Crisologo in 2012

Member of the Philippine House of Representatives for Quezon City's 1st district
- In office June 30, 2016 – June 30, 2019
- Preceded by: Francisco Calalay Jr.
- Succeeded by: Anthony Peter Crisologo
- In office June 30, 2004 – June 30, 2013
- Preceded by: Reynaldo Calalay
- Succeeded by: Francisco Calalay Jr.

Member of the Quezon City Council from the 1st district
- In office June 30, 1998 – June 30, 2004

Personal details
- Born: Vincent Pichay Crisologo; May 31, 1947 (age 79) Vigan, Ilocos Sur, Philippines
- Party: PFP (2024–present)
- Other political affiliations: Lakas (2021–2024); PDP–Laban (2017–2021); UNA (2012–2017); Nacionalista (1971, 1992–1995, 1998–2004, 2007–2012); LDP (2004–2007); NPC (1995–1998)
- Spouse: Rita Dario Crisologo
- Children: 4
- Education: De La Salle University; Far Eastern University
- Occupation: Politician
- Profession: Businessman

Vincent "Bingbong" Pichay Crisologo (born May 31, 1947) is a Filipino politician and evangelist who served as the representative of the Quezon City's 1st district from 2004 to 2013 and from 2016 to 2019. He also served as a councilor in Quezon City from 1998 to 2004.

== Early life ==
Vincent Pichay Crisologo was born on May 31, 1947, in Vigan, Ilocos Sur to Floro Singson Crisologo (July 29, 1909 – October 18, 1970), a representative of Ilocos Sur's 1st district who was the author/father of the Philippine Social Security System Law and Carmen Pichay (June 5, 1923 – January 31, 2018), who would later be elected as governor of Ilocos Sur from 1964 to 1971. He is a paternal cousin of Luis "Chavit" Singson, the incumbent municipal mayor of Narvacan, Ilocos Sur and former governor of Ilocos Sur.

On October 18, 1970, Bingbong's father, Floro, then the representative for Ilocos Sur's 1st district, was attending the Sunday mass at the Vigan Cathedral and was about to fall in line for the communion when a lone gunman shot him in the head. The incident caused panic in the church so the assassin was able to run and disappear. Up to this day, the murder has not been solved and it is generally believed by the public that it was politically motivated.

=== Arson conviction and absolute pardon ===
Crisologo was convicted of arson in 1970 for burning Barangay Ora Centro and Ora Este in the town of Bantay, Ilocos Sur and was sentenced with a penalty of double life imprisonment. He served time in jail starting from June 1972. He became a committed Christian while he was in jail and began conducting Bible studies and evangelizing fellow inmates there. He was pardoned via an absolute pardon by President Ferdinand Marcos in 1980. He was released from prison at December 31, 1980, at 11:55 p.m, which he believed to a prayer answered by God.

After his release, he founded The Loved Flock Catholic-Charismatic Community after being released from jail. He led the spiritual formation of its members and extended assistance to members with various needs, from financial to run-of-the mill requests.

== Political career ==
=== 1971 Mayoralty bid in Vigan ===
In 1971, he ran for mayor of Vigan in the same party with his mother, who was then the incumbent Ilocos Sur governor. Both of them lost to his paternal cousins Evaristo “Titong” Singson and Luis “Chavit” Singson as the Vigan mayor and the Ilocos Sur governor, respectively.

=== 1992 Senate bid ===
In 1992, he ran for senator under the ticket of the Nacionalista Party. He did not get one of the 24 seats allotted in the Philippine Senate as he placed 54th in the final election result.

=== 1995 Congress bid ===
Crisologo first ran as congressman in 1995 in the 1st district of Quezon City against Reynaldo Calalay and Renato Yap. However, he lost in this election to Calalay.

=== Councilor (1998–2004) ===
Crisologo served as councilor of Quezon City from the 1st district from 1998 to 2004. He first ran in 1998 and was reelected in 2001. He ran alongside his political ally, Congressman Reynaldo Calalay.

=== Congress (2004–2013; 2016–2019) ===
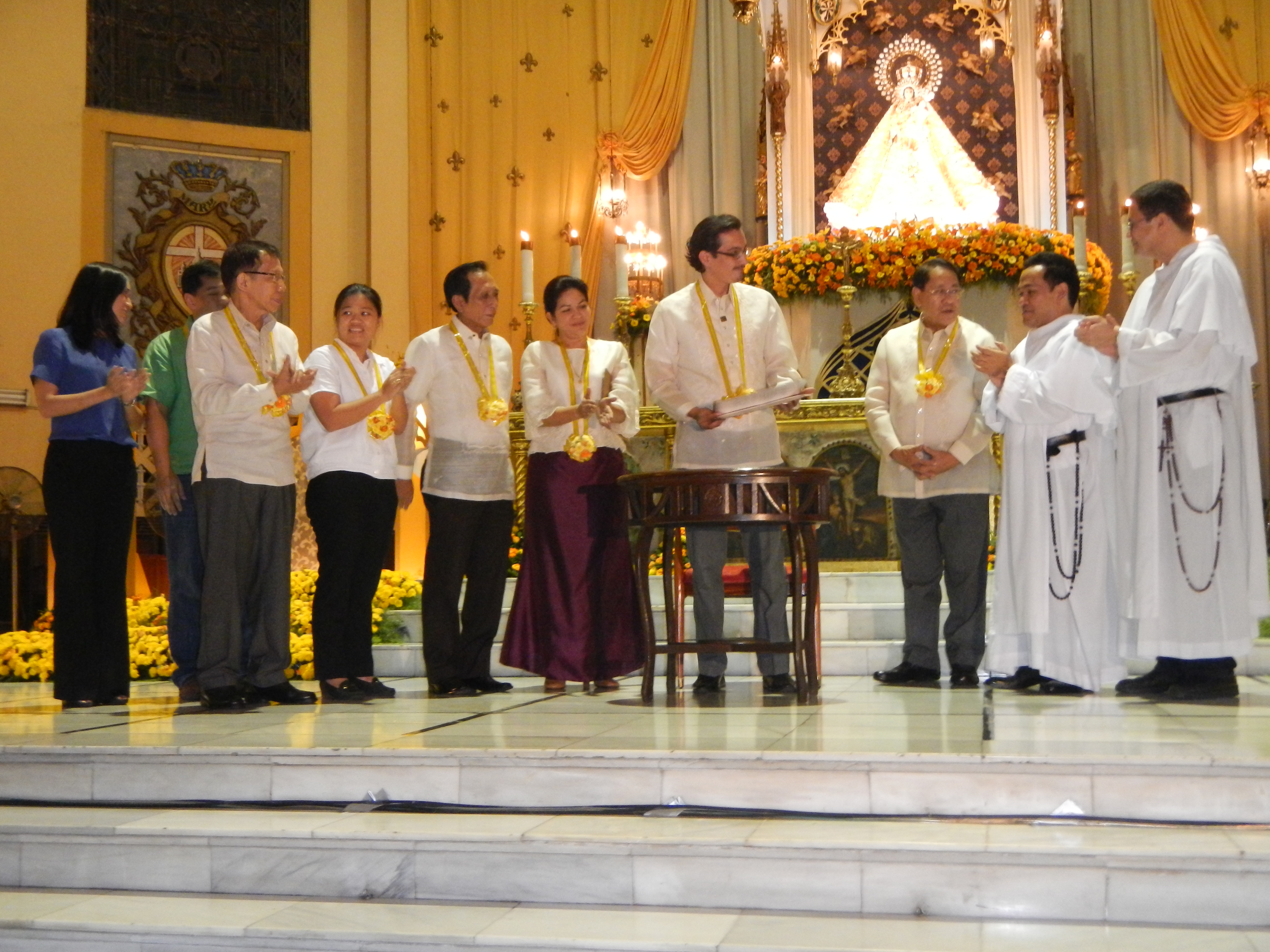
Crisologo (4th from left) during the October 4, 2012, Declaration of the Santo Domingo Church in Quezon City as National Cultural Treasure

Congressman Calalay personally endorsed Crisologo to fill in his slot as the representative of the 1st district before his death in 2003. Crisologo then ran in 2004 and decisively won.

Crisologo was reelected in 2007 and in 2010. His 2010 bid was an overwhelming victory as he won nearly 61% of the votes as compared to his closest opponent who only less than 24% of the votes. He was vice-chairman for the Appropriations, Housing and Urban Development, Information and Communications Technology, Labor and Employment, and Ways and Means Committees of Congress. He was also a member of the following Committees; Metro Manila Development, Millennium Developmental Goals, Public Works and Highways, and Science and Technology.

In 2016, he regained his seat as congressman of the 1st district of Quezon City, defeating incumbent Congressman Boy Calalay of the Liberal Party in a landslide victory. He was also named as the Deputy Majority Leader in the House of Representatives. He is also the Recognized President of PDP–Laban Quezon City Council.

==== Dismissal of Case concerning Alleged PDAF scam ====
On October 18, 2019, the Ombudsman issued an order dismissing all charges filed in 2017 against then Congressman Crisologo for alleged graft and malversation. The Ombudsman stated:

"WHEREFORE, in view of the foregoing, the June 19, 2017 Resolution is hereby RECONSIDERED. The findings of probable cause against Vincent P. Crisologo... are DISMISSED."

According to Rule III, Section 7 of Administrative Order No. 07 or the Rules of Procedure of the Office of the Ombudsman, where the respondent is absolved of the charges, the decision shall be final, executory and unappealable.

The Ombudsman in pronouncing Congressman Crisologo as innocent against the charges against him, stated in its decision that "Mere endorsement of an NGO, however, is not readily taken as illegal per se, as it does not vest any legal import or significance in confirming the accreditation, selection, and evaluation of the NGO."

The Ombudsman added "... while Crisologo did endorse KACI, the process of selection still rested on the DSWD's discretion. In fact, even if there was no such endorsement, the DSWD, as the implementing agency (IA), was still required to follow the procedures provided for by the Revised Guidelines in the Granting, Utilization, Accounting, and Auditing of the Funds released to NGOs/POS (COA Circular 2007-001). As respondent-movants DSWD officials themselves alleged... "the DSWD as a whole, exercise due diligence in assessing the qualifications and validating the operations of KACI," thus admitting that they did not rely merely on Crisologo's endorsement of KACI.

The Ombudsman emphasized the following: 1) that there was no evidence that Crisologo influenced or forced the DSWD to select KACI and thus Crisologo should not be faulted for his mere endorsement; 2) that Crisologo's participation was to merely recommend and identify a project to be funded by his PDAF allocation, that he had no participation in the conduct of public bidding and certainly was not the one responsible for the implementation of the project; and 3) there was no evidence that Crisologo handled, distributed or caused the release of public funds to KACI and neither were the SAROs directed or addressed to him.

Citing jurisprudence, the Ombudsman pointed that Crisologo's role was purely recommendatory, and based on the case of LAMP v. Secretary of Budget and Management which upheld Philconsa v. Enriquez, "the proposals and identification made by the Members of Congress are merely recommendatory."

Back in 2017, Crisologo shrugged off the politically motivated raps. Crisologo said this act of the Ombudsman to charge public officials is what President Rodrigo Duterte is referring to when he ordered an investigation into the alleged partiality of the anti-graft office.

=== 2019 Mayoralty bid in Quezon City ===
In 2019, he ran for mayor of Quezon City with Ipaglaban Mo! host Jopet Sison as his running mate, but lost to outgoing Vice Mayor Joy Belmonte by only 103,265 votes. The voter turnout in the 2019 elections for the position of Mayor was 835,695. On May 12, 2019, the day before the midterm elections, he was illegally arrested for alleged vote buying. The police did not find any evidence of money for the alleged vote buying nor did they show evidence that there were people offering to buy or sell their votes. The next day, May 13, 2019, he was released by the inquest prosecutor citing that there was no evidence furnished by the police to show that vote buying or selling took place. On September 30, 2020, the Office of the City Prosecutor of Quezon City dismissed the charges against him for vote buying, citing lack of evidence. The decision dismissing the charges stated that the police officers did not present and submit proof that he or others gave other people money for the purpose of voting for him.

=== Congress bids ===
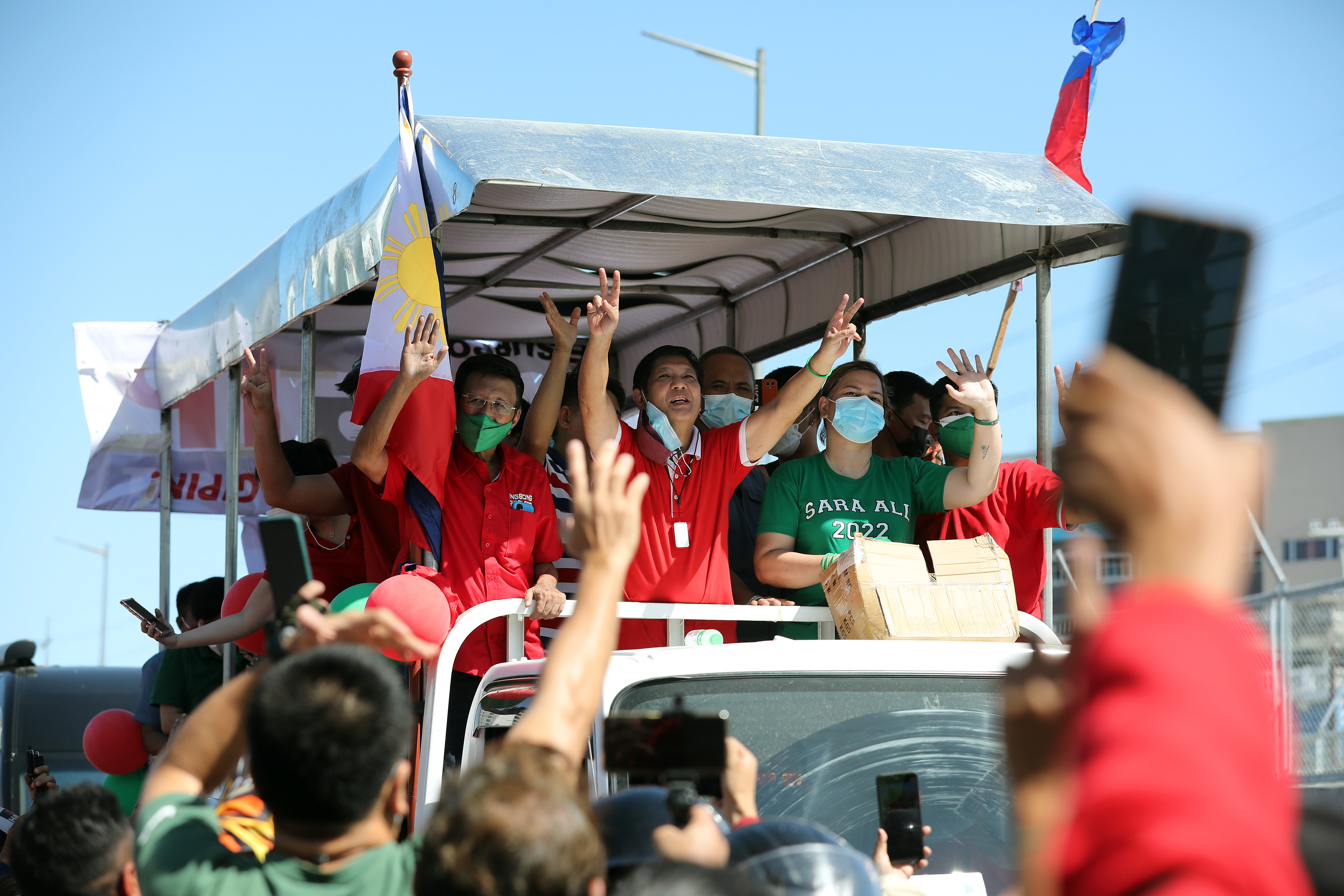
Crisologo (left) with Bongbong Marcos (center) and Sara Duterte (right) during a grand caravan in Quezon City in December 2021

Crisologo attempted a comeback to Congress in 2022, this time running as representative for the 6th district of Quezon City. He was named to the Malayang QC ticket led by mayoralty candidate Mike Defensor. However, he lost to outgoing councilor Marivic Co-Pilar.

Crisologo ran for Congress in 2025 once again, this time back at the 1st district. However, he lost to incumbent Representative Arjo Atayde, who also defeated his son Onyx in 2022.

== Personal life ==
Crisologo is married to Rita Dario Crisologo and has four sons: Floro Cornelius II (Chip), Alexander Philip (Alex), Anthony Peter (Onyx), and Frederick William (Edrix). He also has eight grandchildren.

In the year prior to his senatorial bid, his life story was made into a 1991 movie entitled Bingbong: The Vincent Crisologo Story portrayed by Rudy Fernandez. He is also portrayed by Tirso Cruz III in the 2003 film Chavit.

House of Representatives of the Philippines
Preceded by Reynaldo Calalay	Representative, Quezon City's 1st district 2004–2013	Succeeded by Boy Calalay
Preceded by Boy Calalay	Representative, Quezon City's 1st district 2016–2019	Succeeded by Onyx Crisologo
Party political offices
Preceded by Martin Sanchez Jr.	PDP–Laban nominee for Mayor of Quezon City; 2019	Most recent
