= Helen Gamboa =

Filipina actress, singer, and former beauty queen

Helen Gamboa-Sotto
- Born: Helen Albent Gamboa; May 7, 1945 (age 81); Santa Cruz, Manila, Philippine Commonwealth
- Occupation: Actress
- Years active: 1954–present
- Spouse: Vicente Sotto III (m. 1969)
- Children: 4 (including Lala, Gian, and Ciara)
- Parents: Domingo Ponce Gamboa (father); Eusebia Pangilinan Albent (mother)
- Relatives: Vic Sotto (brother-in-law); Val Sotto (brother-in-law); Vico Sotto (nephew-in-law); Oyo Sotto (nephew-in-law); Pablo Cuneta (brother-in-law); Sharon Cuneta (niece); KC Concepcion (grandniece); Kakie (grandniece)

Helen Gamboa Sotto (Tagalog: [ˈhɛlɛn gamˈbɔwa ˈsɔtɔ]; born Helen Albent Gamboa; May 7, 1945) is a Filipino actress, singer, dancer and former beauty queen.

== Early life ==
Gamboa was born Helen Albent Gamboa on May 7, 1945, at Maternity and Children's Hospital (now Dr. Jose Fabella Memorial Hospital) in Santa Cruz, Manila to Domingo Ponce Gamboa (1908–1987) and Eusebia Pangilinan Albent (1914–1986). She is also the sister of Elaine Gamboa (mother of Sharon Cuneta).

== Career ==
=== 1960s: Early works ===
Gamboa became a runner-up to Cynthia Ugalde by a point in the Miss Press Photography of the Philippines contest in 1961.

In the late 1960s, Gamboa was given the title "Dancing Queen" of Philippine cinema and TV musicals; this title was given to her prior to the popularity of the ABBA song with the same title, the title having been given eight years before the Swedish rock band's song was released in 1976.

=== 2001–2017: Breakthrough ===
Gamboa made a brief TV comeback through the ABS-CBN Primetime TV series Sa Dulo ng Walang Hanggan in 2001–2003, playing the role of Nelia Santos. In 2009, she made her official comeback to Philippine primetime television in ABS-CBN network's Tayong Dalawa, where her son Gian also appeared. This marked Gamboa's 2nd Primetime TV series and comeback where she portrayed the antagonist Elizabeth Martinez in the TV series; the series also became a successful international phenomenon and featured a strong cast of award-winning actors from three generations of television, film, theater actors, some of whom came from appearances in internationally acclaimed indie films.

In 2012, after a two-year hiatus, Gamboa played Margaret Montenegro in the highly acclaimed and most-watched program Walang Hanggan, featuring another ensemble cast where she was reunited with her Tayong Dalawa co-star Coco Martin who led the series. Gamboa's was one of the main role in the series, Margaret Montenegro being the series' main antagonist.

On October 21, 2012, Gamboa showed her knowledge of the dance "Gangnam Style" in her performance in the Walang Hanggang Pasasalamat Concert at the Smart Araneta Coliseum.

=== 2017–2019: Return to GMA ===
In 2017, she returned to GMA Network after twenty-one years and starred as Lolita Honorio in Super Ma'am, which is also her television comeback. She was supposed to play Liza Lorena's role in a past GMA drama, Akin Pa Rin ang Bukas, back in 2013 after signing an exclusive contract but dropped out for health reasons.

=== 2019–present: Return to ABS-CBN ===
Gamboa returned to ABS-CBN for Kahit Minsan Lang but the series was cancelled before it could start filming because of restrictions caused by the COVID-19 pandemic in the Philippines, as well as with the network's franchise renewal issues. Gamboa was supposed to be part of Ikaw Lang ang Iibigin but dropped out and Gina Pareño replaced her said role.

== Personal life ==
Gamboa is married to Tito Sotto an actor, comedian, TV host and politician on September 22, 1969. They have four children: Romina Frances, Lala, Gian Carlo and Ciara; nine grandsons: Romino Vicente, Victorio, Vicente Hugo IV, Carlos Edrigu, Alessandro Jose, Marciano, Juan Rossano, Vincenzo Jose and Domiku Yosef; and two granddaughters: Helena and Amaria Jiliana.

In the 2010 elections, her son Gian Carlo was elected councilor of Quezon City's 3rd District and served for three consecutive terms before being elected as the vice mayor of the city in the 2019 elections, while her daughter Lala was elected in the 6th District of the same city before being appointed chairperson of the Movie and Television Review and Classification Board in 2022.

== Discography ==
=== Albums ===
- Helen Gamboa Sings Together Again (Jonal Records, released in March 1967)
- He'll Come Back To Me (Jonal Records, released in 1967)
- Shing-A-Ling Time (Jonal Records, released in 1968)
- Dance To The Music of Helen Gamboa (Ans Records, released in 1968)
- La Gamboa (Vicor Records, released in 1969)
- Bunny Chanel (RCA Victor International/WEA, released in 1979 under the name "Bunny Chanel")
- Bunny Chanel 2 (RCA Victor International/WEA, released in 1980 under the name "Bunny Chanel")

=== Singles ===
==== 1966 ====
- Gone / Band of Gold (debut single)
- What They Have Done to the Rain? / He'll Come Back to Me (with JA and The Jitterbugs)
- The More I See You / These Boots Are Made for Walkin' (with Doming Amarillo and his Tijuana Brass)
- Strangers in the Night / The Impossible Dream
- Just Say Goodbye / I Can't Remember Ever Loving You
- The Thirty-First of June / It's Not Unusual
- I Love You / No Other Love
- A Groovy Kind of Love / Forever with You (with JA and The Jitterbugs)
- Soul Time / In the Midnight Hour
- Sweet Love and Sweet Forgiveness / Piel Canela
- Whispering Hope / Silver Bells (duet with Louie Levant)
- The In Crowd /
- Michael (Row the Boat Ashore) /

==== 1967 ====
- Somethin' Stupid / Summer Wine (duet with Gilbert Gamboa)
- Two of Us / Till We Meet Again (duet with Louie Levant)
- This Is My Song / Color My World
- Together Again / Cast Your Fate to the Wind
- All I See Is You / All Cried Out
- Oh, Oh What A Kiss / Wednesday's Child
- Only You (Can Break My Heart) / Time Alone Will Tell
- Uptight / Single Girl (with JA and The Jitterbugs)
- Please Don't Go / Cherish
- Sugar, Let's Shing-A-Ling / Shing-A-Ling Time
- Puppet On A String (with JA and The Jitterbugs) /
- Somebody to Love /

==== 1968 ====
- Ain't No Mountain High Enough / Two Can Have a Party (with The Tilt-Down Men)
- I'm Coming Home / Kiss Me Goodbye
- After You / Why Can't I Remember to Forget You
- Ode To Billie Joe / We've Got To Have Love (with The Tilt-Down Men)
- Don't Give Up / Everytime I See a Rainbow
- Angel of the Morning / Sweet Memories
- It's a Happening World / Shoot Your Shot
- Bang-Shang-A-Lang / Shotgun

==== 1969 ====
- The Fool On The Hill / The Horse (Love is All Right)
- Ob-La-Di, Ob-La-Da / Harper Valley PTA
- Mississippi Delta / The Glory of Love
- I'm a Tiger / Every Day I Have to Cry Some
- This Girl's in Love with You / Where Is Tomorrow
- Those Were the Days / Stay Away from Love
- Bitter Memories / Our Day Will Come
- Boom Bang-A-Bang / The Windmills of Your Mind
- Happy Heart / Let The Music Start
- Son of a Preacher Man / Put a Little Love in Your Heart

==== 1970 ====
- Evil Ways / Great Big Bundle of Love
- If Ever You Go / Put A Smile on Your Face
- Do the Popcorn / Both Sides Now

==== 1973 ====
- Anytime of the Year / It's a Crying Shame
- A Cowboy's Work Is Never Done / Betcha By Golly, Wow
- Put Your Hand in the Hand / Rose Garden
- Do Me / Somebody Waiting
- Love a Little Longer / Rock and Roll Lullaby

==== 1974 ====
- Doctor's Orders / Only Yesterday
- Please, Mr. Postman / My Melody of Love
- Head Over Heels / Leave a Little Room

== Filmography ==
=== Television ===
Year	Title	Role(s)
1966	Helen	Herself
1974–1977	Friends	
1979	C.U.T.E.	Herself
1979	Eat Bulaga!	Host
1981–1996	Lovingly Yours, Helen	Host
1991	Maalaala Mo Kaya: Lampin	Dolor
1991	Luv Ko Si Kris	
1992–1994	Heart to Heart with Helen	Lead host
1993	Maalaala Mo Kaya: Mga Buto at Punla	
2001–2003	Sa Dulo ng Walang Hanggan	Nelia Santos
2009	Maalaala Mo Kaya: Mesa	Linda
2009	Tayong Dalawa	Elizabeth "Mamita" Martinez†
2010	Maalaala Mo Kaya: Diploma	Rose
2010	Maalaala Mo Kaya: Parol	Maring
2012	Walang Hanggan	Doña Margaret "Mamo" Cruz-Montenegro
2017	Super Ma'am	Lolita Honorio
2017	From Helen's Kitchen	Host

=== Film ===
- Maalaala Mo Kaya (1954)
- Palanca (1960)
- Walang Pagkalupig (1962)
- Sakay and Moy (1962)
- Gorio and His Jeepney (1962)
- Hugo, the Sidewalk Vendor (1962)
- Gorio... Kahapon, Ngayon at Bukas (1963)
- The Nite Owl (Dance Party) (1964)
- Let's Go (1964)
- DJ Dance Time (1964)
- Misyong Mapanganib (1965)
- Dolpinger (1965)
- Guillermo Bravado (1965)
- Stranger in the Night (1966)
- Doble Trece (1966)
- Baril sa Aking Kamay (1966)
- Palos: Counterspy (1966)
- Yesterday (1967)
- Target: The A-Go-Go Generation (1967)
- Like Father, Like Son: Kung Ano ang Punò Siya ang Bunga (1967)
- Otra Vez, Señorita (1968)
- Operation: Discothèque (1968)
- O Kaka, O Kaka (1968)
- May I Go Out (1968)
- Let's Go Hippie (1968)
- Kailanma'y 'Di Ka Mag-iisa (1968)
- Boogaloo (1968)
- Bang-Shang-A-Lang (1968)
- Ngitngit ng Pitong Whistle Bomb (1968) as Nerissa
- Matimbang ang Dugo sa Tubig (1969)
- Banda 24 (1969)
- Love Is for the Two of Us (1970)
- Ako'y Tao, May Dugo at Lamán (1970) as Luisa
- Sarhento Fofonggay: A, Ewan! (1974)
- Biktima (1974) as Nurse
- Darna and the Giants (1974) as X3X
- Kapitan Kulas (1975)
- Iniibig Kita... Father Salvador (1976)
- Mga Mata ni Angelita (1978) as Janet - Gonzalo's Daughter
- Feliciano (1978)
- Roberta (1979)
- Angelita... Ako ang Iyong Ina (1980) as Janet
- Angelita, Ako ang Iyong Ina Part II (1982)
- Give Me Five! (1984)
- Mama Said Papa Said I Love You (1985)
- Hot Summer (1989)
- Kailan Mahuhugasan ang Kasalanan? (1989) as Adora Meneses
- Oras-oras, Araw-araw (1989)
- Umiyak Pati Langit (1991)
- Bagong Bayani (1995) as Flor Contemplacion
- Mano Po 6: A Mother's Love (2009)
- Segunda Mano (2011) as Adela Domingo
- Etiquette for Mistresses (2015) as Conchita San Diego

== Awards and nominations ==
Year	Award giving body	Category	Nominated work	Results
1969	Awit Awards	Female Recording Artist of the Year	—N/a	Won
