= 2016 Quezon City local elections =

17th Mayoral elections in Quezon City

2016 Quezon City mayoral election
- May 9, 2016
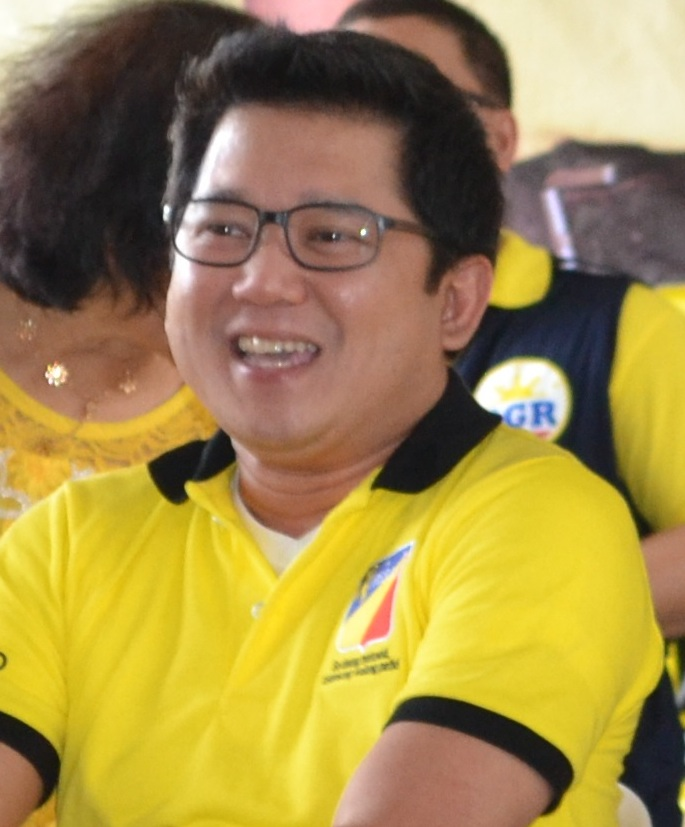

Nominee	Herbert Bautista	Leon Peralta
Party	Liberal	UNA
Running mate	Josefina Belmonte	Rolando Jota
Popular vote	729,917	35,087
Percentage	80.03%	3.85%
Nominee	Martin Sanchez, Jr.	Alexander Lague
Party	PDP–Laban	PGP
Running mate		Henry Samonte
Popular vote	29,938	9,946
Percentage	3.28%	1.09%
Mayor before election
Herbert Bautista
Liberal
Elected Mayor
Herbert Bautista
Liberal

Local elections will be held in Quezon City on May 9, 2016, within the Philippine general election. Registered voters of the city elected candidates for the following elective local posts: mayor, vice mayor, district representative, and six councilors at-large for each district. There are six legislative districts in the city.

== Background ==
Incumbent City Mayor Herbert Bautista will be facing tight competition in the mayoralty elections against Leon Peralta, an advocate against Trapos (traditional politicians) and political dynasty, NGO worker Martin Sanchez, Jr. and radioman Alex Lague. Vice Mayor Joy Belmonte, who will seek a reelection, will faced four challengers, including radioman Rolando Jota, and businessmen Henry Samonte, Allan Bantilo and Glenn Nicanor Acol.

In the congressional race, only four Congressmen, Winnie Castelo, Jorge Banal, Alfred Vargas and Kit Belmonte will be running for reelection in the 2nd, 3rd, 5th and 6th districts, without any opponents. House Speaker Sonny Belmonte will faced up against Hadja Lorna Aquino and Hans Palacios in the 4th district. Incumbent representative Francisco Calalay and his predecessor Bingbong Crisologo will be tossed-up for the seat in the 1st district.

== Candidates ==
=== Mayor ===
Quezon City mayoral election
Party	Candidate	Votes	%
Liberal	Herbert "Bistek" Bautista*	729,591	80.03%
BUKLOD	Leon Peralta	35,087	3.85%
Independent	Martin Sanchez Jr.	29,938	3.28%
PGRP	Alexander Lague	9,946	1.09%
Margin of victory		694,830	76.19%
Valid ballots		804,888	88.25%
Invalid or blank votes		107,140	11.75%
Total votes		912,028	100%
Liberal hold			

(*) Note: He was then considered by the Liberal Party to be part of their senatorial line-up but he decided to run instead as mayor.

=== Vice Mayor ===
Quezon City Vice mayoral election
Party	Candidate	Votes	%
Liberal	Josefina "Joy" Belmonte	736,274	80.73%
Independent	Henry Samonte	26,254	2.88%
KBL	Rolando Jota	10,238	1.12%
Independent	Allan Bantillo	10,137	1.11%
Independent	Glen Acol	5,151	0.57%
Margin of victory		710,020	77.85%
Valid ballots		788,054	86.41%
Invalid or blank votes		123,974	13.59%
Total votes		912,028	100%
Liberal hold			

=== Representative ===
==== 1st District ====
2016 Philippine House of Representatives election at Quezon City's 1st district
Party	Candidate	Votes	%
UNA	Vincent "Bingbong" Crisologo	81,799	55.20%
Liberal	Francisco "Boy" Calalay	57,056	38.50%
Margin of victory		24,743	16.70%
Valid ballots		138,855	93.70%
Invalid or blank votes		9,342	6.30%
Total votes		138,855	100%
PDP–Laban gain from Liberal			

==== 2nd District ====
2016 Philippine House of Representatives election at Quezon City's 2nd district
Party	Candidate	Votes	%
Liberal	Winston "Winnie" Castelo	172,001	79.36%
Invalid or blank votes		44,722	20.64%
Total votes		216,723	100.00
Liberal hold			

==== 3rd District ====
2016 Philippine House of Representatives election at Quezon City's 3rd district
Party	Candidate	Votes	%
Liberal	Jorge "Bolet" Banal	79,579	75.05%
Invalid or blank votes		26,458	24.95%
Total votes		106,037	100%
Liberal hold			

==== 4th District ====
2016 Philippine House of Representatives election at Quezon City's 4th district
Party	Candidate	Votes	%
Liberal	Feliciano "Sonny" Belmonte, Jr.	115,007	77.08%
Independent	Hans Palacios	6,900	4.62%
Independent	Hadja Lorna Aquino	3,961	2.47%
Margin of victory		108,107	72.44%
Valid ballots		125,598	84.17%
Invalid or blank votes		23,614	15.83%
Total votes		149,212	100%
Liberal hold			

==== 5th District ====
2016 Philippine House of Representatives election at Quezon City's 5th district
Party	Candidate	Votes	%
Liberal	Alfred Vargas	134,946	84.16%
Invalid or blank votes		25,398	15.84%
Total votes		160,344	100%
Liberal hold			

==== 6th District ====
2016 Philippine House of Representatives election at Quezon City's 6th district
Party	Candidate	Votes	%
Liberal	Jose Christopher "Kit" Belmonte	102,171	77.69%
Invalid or blank votes		29,344	22.31%
Total votes		131,515	100%
Liberal hold			

=== Councilor ===
==== 1st District ====
Note: Incumbent councilors Dorothy Delarmente and Ricardo Belmonte Jr are barred and cannot seek reelection. They will running for the party-list seat as the 1st and 2nd nominees of Serbisyo sa Bayan party-list, respectively.

City Council election at Quezon City's 1st district
Party	Candidate	Votes	%
PDP–Laban	Anthony "Onyx" Crisologo	100,675	15.35%
Liberal	Lena Marie "Mayen" Juico	88,707	13.53%
NPC	Elizabeth "Tita Beth" Delarmente	86,708	13.22%
Liberal	Victor "Jun" Ferrer, Jr.	85,088	12.98%
Liberal	Ollie Belmonte	80,585	12.29%
Liberal	Alexis "Kuya Alex" Herrera	75,979	11.59%
UNA	Von Yalong	68,217	10.40%
Independent	William "Maca" Chua	51,628	7.87%
Independent	Dante Yang	17,871	2.72%
Total votes		655,458	100%

==== 2nd District ====
Note: Incumbent councilor Roderick Paulate cannot seek reelection due to his perpetual disqualification in the public office.

City Council election at Quezon City's 2nd district
Party	Candidate	Votes	%
Liberal	Precious Hipolito-Castelo	164,852	16.19%
Liberal	Voltaire "Bong" Liban	162,097	15.92%
Liberal	Ramon "Toto" Medalla	149,381	14.67%
Liberal	Estrella "Star" Valmocina	141,731	13.92%
Liberal	Ranulfo "Rannie" Ludovica	122,683	12.05%
NPC	Roderick Paulate	109,298	10.73%
Independent	Ricardo Bello	45,232	4.44%
Independent	Eddie Garcia	32,985	3.24%
KBL	Direk Tarca	20,833	2.04%
PGRP	Glenda Araneta	19,219	1.88%
Independent	Antonio Denosta	15,043	1.47%
Independent	Joseph Arias	13,747	1.35%
Independent	Danny Liwanag	11,568	1.13%
Independent	Bianca Magada	9,085	0.89%
Total votes		1,000,456	100%

==== 3rd District ====
Note: Incumbent councilor Jaime Borres is not eligible for reelection.

City Council election at Quezon City's 3rd district
Party	Candidate	Votes	%
Liberal	Allan Benedict Reyes	63,236	12.93%
Liberal	Gian Sotto	58,661	12.00%
NPC	Kate Coseteng	57,330	11.72%
Nacionalista	Don de Leon	56,871	11.63%
NPC	Franz Pumaren	56,616	11.58%
Nacionalista	Eufemio Lagumbay	52,206	10.68%
PRP	John Defensor	51,817	10.60%
NPC	Daniel Dy	30,604	6.26%
Liberal	Lengborres Dela Pasion	21,927	4.48%
NPC	Teddy Borres	16,908	3.45%
Independent	Anthony Castelo	14,859	3.03%
PRP	Kevin John Gamboa	3,543	0.72%
PRP	Adelaida Tarronas	2,340	0.47%
PRP	Oliver James Mora	1,890	0.38%
Total votes		488,808	100%

==== 4th District ====
Note: Incumbent councilors Vincent Belmonte and Atty. Bong Suntay are barred and cannot seek reelection. Incumbents Jessica Castelo Daza and Bayani Hipol will not run for reelection.

City Council election at Quezon City's 4th district
Party	Candidate	Votes	%
Liberal	Marvin Rillo	101,548	16.01%
Liberal	Raquel Malañgen	96,935	15.28%
Liberal	Irene Belmonte	93,322	14.71%
NUP	Ivy Lagman	91,928	14.49%
Liberal	Maria Aurora "Marra" Suntay	91,131	14.36%
Liberal	Hero Bautista	73,394	11.57%
NUP	Alfredo "Al" Flores	35,915	5.66%
Independent	Virgilio "Leo" Ferrer II	30,359	4.78%
Independent	James Ibañez	19,742	3.11%
Total votes		634,274	100%

==== 5th District ====
City Council election at Quezon City's 5th district
Party	Candidate	Votes	%
Liberal	Jose Visaya	119,408	15.95%
Liberal	Karl Edgar Castelo	105,633	14.11%
Liberal	Julienne Allyson Rae "Aly" Medalla	102,958	13.75%
Liberal	Godofredo "Godie" Liban	98,607	13.17%
Liberal	Andres Jose "Anjo" Yllana	91,581	12.23%
Liberal	Allan Francisco	90,981	12.15%
Independent	Jose Arnel Quebal	46,988	6.27%
Independent	Alfredo "Freddy" Roxas	38,643	5.16%
Independent	Johnny Revilla	32,760	4.37%
Independent	Clemente Racela	9,024	1.20%
BUKLOD	Rolando "Dan Alvaro" Galura	7,405	0.98%
KBL	Romeo Salac	4,292	0.57%
Total votes		709,637	100%

==== 6th District ====
Note: Incumbent councilor Candy Medina is barred and cannot seek reelection.

City Council election at Quezon City's 6th district
Party	Candidate	Votes	%
Liberal	Marivic Co-Pilar	91,671	14.89%
Liberal	Melencio "Bobby" Castelo Jr.	90,371	14.68%
Liberal	Rogelio "Roger" Juan	87,576	14.23%
Liberal	Diorella Marie "Lala" Sotto-De Leon	83,970	13.64%
Liberal	Donato "Donny" Matias	83,596	13.58%
Liberal	Eric Medina	76,064	12.35%
Nacionalista	Maria Teresa "Tates" Gana	59,860	9.72%
Independent	Luis Saludes	17,137	2.78%
Independent	Andrew San Diego	11,817	1.92%
Independent	Danilo Gaurino	6,764	1.09%
Independent	Juanito Camano	6,594	1.07%
Total votes		615,420	100%
