= 2001 Quezon City local elections =

12th Mayoral election in Quezon City

2001 Quezon City mayoral election
- May 14, 2001
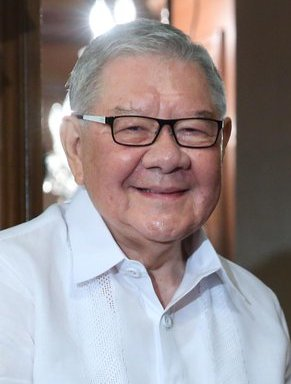
Nominee	Feliciano Belmonte Jr.	Rudy Fernandez
Party	Lakas	LDP
Alliance	PPC	PnM
Running mate	Connie Angeles	Herbert Bautista (Independent)
Popular vote	343,107	228,773
Mayor before election
Ismael Mathay Jr.
Independent
Elected mayor
Feliciano Belmonte Jr.
Lakas

Local elections were held in Quezon City on May 14, 2001, within the Philippine general election. The voters elected for the elective local posts in the city: the mayor, vice mayor, the four Congressmen, and the councilors, 6 in each of the city's four legislative districts.

== Background ==
Mayor Mel Mathay was term limited, and he ran as representative for fourth district. His place was contested by Fourth District Rep. Feliciano Belmonte Jr., actor Rudy Fernandez and 2nd district representative Dante Liban.

Vice Mayor Fe Consuelo "Connie" Angeles was on her first term, and ran for re-election for second term. She faced former Vice Mayor and defeated 1998 mayoral candidate Herbert Bautista, Fernandez's running-mate.

== Results ==
=== For Mayor ===
Fourth District Rep. Feliciano Belmonte Jr. won over actor Rudy Fernandez, 2nd district representative Dante Liban and other five candidates.

2001 Quezon City mayoral election
Candidate	Party	Votes	%
Feliciano Belmonte Jr.	Lakas–NUCD–UMDP	343,107	60.00
Rudy Fernandez	Laban ng Demokratikong Pilipino	228,773	40.00
Florian Alvarez	Independent		
Andres Co	Independent		
Dante Liban	Independent		
Romeo Mercado	Partido Isang Bansa, Isang Diwa		
Crispin Narciso	Independent		
Benjamin Samson	Independent		
Total		571,880	100.00
Lakas–NUCD–UMDP hold			

=== For Vice Mayor ===
Former Vice Mayor Herbert Bautista defeated incumbent Vice Mayor Fe Consuelo "Connie" Angeles and five other candidates. Bautista successfully reclaimed his seat as vice mayor of the city after his defeat in 1998 mayoral race to Mayor Ismael "Mel" Mathay Jr.

2001 Quezon City vice mayoral election
Candidate	Party
Herbert Bautista	Independent
Connie Angeles (incumbent)	Lakas–NUCD–UMDP
Eduardo David	Independent
Salvacion De Las Alas	Independent
Roland Jota	Independent
Jopet Sison	Liberal Party
Leonardo Villaflor	Partido Isang Bansa, Isang Diwa
Total
Independent gain from Lakas–NUCD–UMDP	

=== For Councilors ===
==== First District ====
City Council Elections in Quezon City's First District
Party	Candidate	Votes	%
Lakas	Wilma Sarino	70,993	
Lakas	Victor "Jun" Ferrer Jr.	67,220	
Lakas	Elizabeth "Beth" Delarmente	62,800	
Lakas	Bernadette Herrera-Dy	56,843	
LDP	Vincent "Bingbong" Crisologo	70,404	
LDP	Rommel "Abe" Abesamis	55,769	

==== Second District ====
City Council Elections in Quezon City's Second District
Party	Candidate	Votes	%
Lakas	Voltaire Godofredo "Bong" Liban III	127,125	
Lakas	Mary Aiko Melendez	120,075	
Lakas	Ramon "Toto" Medalla	108,275	
Lakas	Eric Medina	100,275	
Lakas	Mary Ann Susano	94,422	
Independent	Allan "Butch" Francisco	101,420	

==== Third District ====
City Council Elections in Quezon City's Third District
Party	Candidate	Votes	%
Lakas	Jorge "Bolet" Banal Jr.	54,104	
Lakas	Dante De Guzman	36,094	
LDP	Franz Pumaren	43,344	
LDP	Wencerom Benedict "Wency" Lagumbay	43,140	
LDP	Diorella Maria "Lala" Sotto	37,569	
NPC	Julian Coseteng	44,709	

==== Fourth District ====
City Council Elections in Quezon City's Fourth District
Party	Candidate	Votes	%
Lakas	Jesus Manuel "Bong" Suntay Jr.	78,428	
Lakas	Antonio "Ariel" Inton Jr.	60,502	
Lakas	Ricardo del Rosario	43,045	
Lakas	Restituto "Resty" Malangen	42,137	
LDP	Alma "Neneng" Montilla	63,083	
LDP	Janet "Babes" Malaya	50,137	
