= Quezon City Council =

Governance of Quezon City, Philippines

Quezon City Council Sangguniang Panlungsod - Lungsod Quezon
- 23rd Quezon City Council
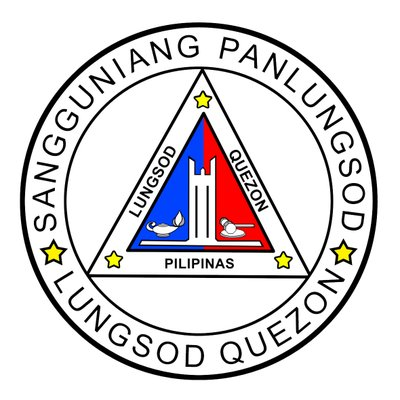

Type
- Type: Unicameral
- Term limits: 3 terms (9 years)

Leadership
- Presiding Officer: Gian Carlo G. Sotto, SBP since June 30, 2019
- Floor Leader: Dorothy A. Delarmente, SBP since October 16, 2023

Structure
- Seats: 38 councilors (including 2 ex officio members); 1 ex officio presiding officer
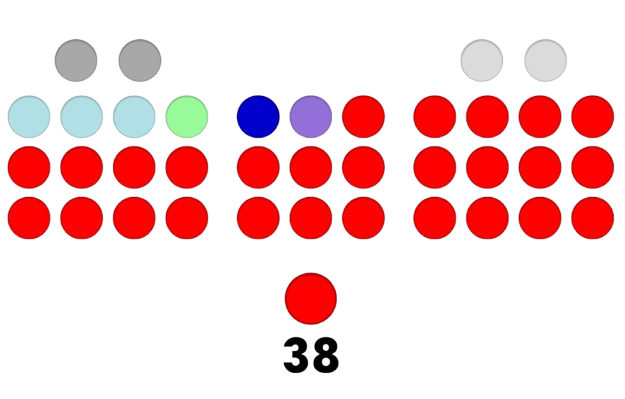
- Political groups: SBP (28) Lakas (3) Independent (2) Nacionalista (1) PFP (1) Aksyon (1) Nonpartisan (2)
- Length of term: 3 years
- Authority: Quezon City Charter; Local Government Code of the Philippines

Elections
- Voting system: Plurality-at-large voting (36 seats); Indirect election (2 seats)
- Last election: May 12, 2025
- Next election: May 15, 2028

Meeting place
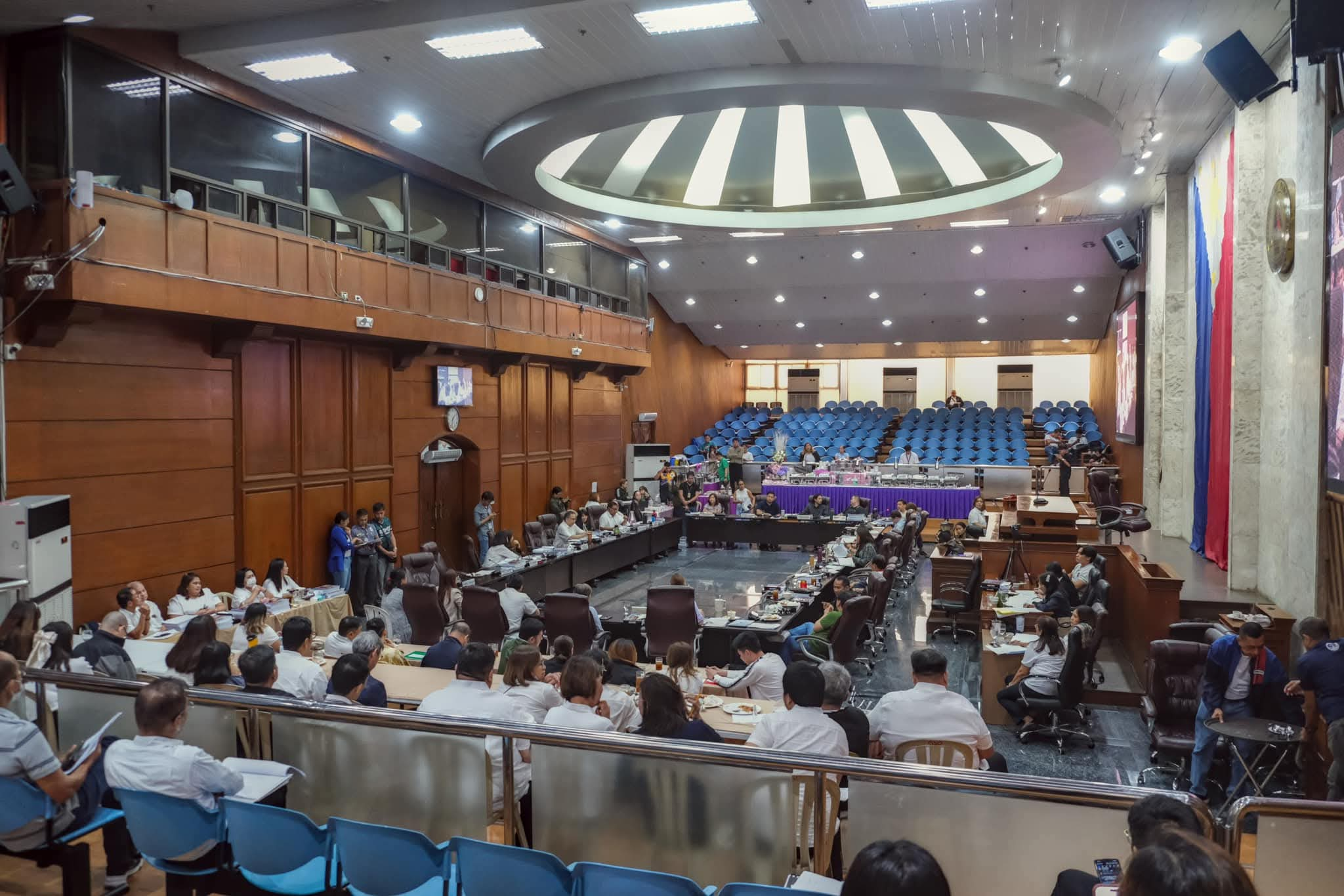
- Carlos Albert Hall, Quezon City Hall

Website
- qccouncil.quezoncity.gov.ph

The Quezon City Council is Quezon City's Sangguniang Panlungsod or legislature. It is composed of 36 councilors, with 6 councilors elected from Quezon City's six councilor districts (coextensive with the Legislative districts of Quezon City) and two councilors elected from the ranks of barangay (neighborhood) chairmen and the Sangguniang Kabataan (SK; youth councils). The presiding officer of the council is the Vice Mayor, who is elected citywide.

== History ==
The Quezon City Council was originally formed on October 12, 1939, pursuant to the provisions of Section 11 of Commonwealth Act No. 502, otherwise known as "An Act to Create Quezon City".

In its first formation, there were only three members, all appointed by the President of the Philippines. The first three members of the council were Dr. Eusebio Aguilar (Director of Health and City Health Officer), Jose Paez (Engineering Division of the Capital City Planning Commission) and Alejandro Roces Sr. (General Manager of the People's Homesite Corporation).

Membership in the City Council increased as the city's population grew. By 1959, there were eight councilors. In 1972, the council's membership was increased to 16; four for each of the city's four districts. From 1988 to 2010, the council's composition increased to 27 as each of the four districts elected 6 councilors with an additional of two ex-officio members, plus the vice mayor, serving as the council's presiding officer.

When Republic Act No. 10170 was signed into law, creating two new legislative districts for Quezon City, 12 additional councilors were added to the council, increasing its membership to 39.

== Powers, duties and functions ==
The Sangguniang Panlungsod, as the legislative body of the city, is mandated by the Local Government Code of 1991 (Republic Act No. 7160) to:

- Enact ordinances;
- Approve resolutions;
- Appropriate funds for the general welfare of the city and its inhabitants; and
- Ensure the proper exercise of the corporate powers of the city as provided for under Section 22 of the Local Government Code.

Furthermore, the following duties and functions are relegated to the Sangguniang Panlungsod:

- Approve ordinances and pass resolutions necessary for an efficient and effective city government;
- Generate and maximize the use of resources and revenues for the development plans, program objectives and priorities of the city as provided for under section 18 of the Local Government Code of 1991, with particular attention to agro-industrial development and citywide growth and progress;
- Enact ordinances granting franchises and authorizing the issuance of permits or licenses, upon such conditions and for such purposes intended to promote the general welfare of the inhabitants of the city but subject to the provisions of Book II of the Local Government Code of 1991;
- Regulate activities relative to the use of land, buildings, and structures within the city in order to promote the general welfare of its inhabitants;
- Approve ordinances which shall ensure the efficient and effective delivery of the basic services and facilities as provided for under Section 17 of the Local Government Code; and
- Exercise such other powers and perform such other duties and functions as may be prescribed by law or ordinance.

== Membership ==
Each of Quezon City's six councilor districts elects six councilors to the council. In plurality-at-large voting, a voter may vote up to six candidates, with the candidates having the six highest number of votes being elected. In addition, the barangay chairmen and the SK chairmen throughout the city elect amongst themselves their representatives to the council. Hence, there are 38 councilors.

City council elections are synchronized with other elections in the country. Elections are held every first Monday of May every third year since 1992.

=== Current councils ===
23rd City Council (2025-2028)
Position	Name	District	Party
Presiding officer	Gian Carlo G. Sotto		SBP
City councilors	Tany Jose L. Calalay	1st district	SBP
City councilors	Bernard R. Herrera	1st district	SBP
City councilors	Dorothy A. Delarmente	1st district	SBP
City councilors	Joseph Emile P. Juico	1st district	SBP
City councilors	Ma. Concepcion M. Ferrer-Lim	1st district	SBP
City councilors	Nicole Ella V. Crisologo	1st district	PFP
City councilors	Fernando Miguel F. Belmonte	2nd district	SBP
City councilors	Eden Delilah A. Medina	2nd district	SBP
City councilors	Voltaire Godofredo L. Liban III	2nd district	SBP
City councilors	Julienne Alyson Rae Medalla	2nd district	SBP
City councilors	Clark David C. Valmocina	2nd district	SBP
City councilors	Ranulfo Z. Ludovica	2nd district	SBP
City councilors	Geleen G. Lumbad	3rd district	SBP
City councilors	Christoffer Allan A. Liquigan	3rd district	Independent
City councilors	Albert Alvin L. Antonio III	3rd district	SBP
City councilors	Wencerom Benedict C. Lagumbay	3rd district	Nacionalista
City councilors	Jose Mario Don S. De Leon	3rd district	SBP
City councilors	Franz Luis Benjamin DG. Pumaren	3rd district	SBP
City councilors	Vicente Eric DG. Belmonte Jr.	4th district	SBP
City councilors	Edgar G. Yap	4th district	SBP
City councilors	Nanette C. Daza	4th district	Lakas
City councilors	Ma. Imelda A. Rillo	4th district	Lakas
City councilors	Jesus Miguel C. Suntay	4th district	Independent
City councilors	Raquel Cecille S. Malañgen	4th district	Lakas
City councilors	Joseph M. Visaya	5th district	SBP
City councilors	Aiko S. Melendez	5th district	SBP
City councilors	Alfredo Paolo D. Vargas III	5th district	SBP
City councilors	Karl Edgar C. Castelo	5th district	Aksyon
City councilors	Shaira L. Liban	5th district	SBP
City councilors	Ramon Vicente V. Medalla	5th district	SBP
City councilors	Ma. Eleanor R. Juan	6th district	SBP
City councilors	Emmanuel Banjo A. Pilar	6th district	SBP
City councilors	Kristine Alexia R. Matias	6th district	SBP
City councilors	Victor D. Bernardo	6th district	SBP
City councilors	Victorio Manuel S. Generoso	6th district	SBP
City councilors	Erwin Rey A. Medina	6th district	SBP
ABC President	Jose Maria "Mari" M. Rodriguez (Laging Handa)		Nonpartisan
SK Federation President	Jhon Angelli "Sami" Neri (Damayan)		Nonpartisan

=== Former councils ===
22nd City Council (2022-2025)
Position	Name	District	Party
Presiding officer	Gian Carlo G. Sotto		SBP
City councilors	Alex Bernard R. Cruz-Herrera	1st district	SBP
City councilors	Joseph Emile Juico	1st district	SBP
City councilors	Dorothy "Doray" A. Delarmente	1st district	SBP
City councilors	Tany Joe "TJ" L. Calalay	1st district	SBP
City councilors	Nicole Ella "Nikki" V. Crisologo	1st district	PFP
City councilors	Charm Ferrer	1st district	SBP
City councilors	Aly Medalla	2nd district	SBP
City councilors	Dave Valmocina	2nd district	SBP
City councilors	Eden Delilah "Candy" Medina-Atienza	2nd district	SBP
City councilors	Rannie Ludovica	2nd district	SBP
City councilors	Fernando Miguel "Mikey" F. Belmonte	2nd district	SBP
City councilors	Godie Liban	2nd district	SBP
City councilors	Kate Abigael G. Coseteng	3rd district	SBP
City councilors	Geleen Lumbad	3rd district	SBP
City councilors	Chuckie Antonio	3rd district	SBP
City councilors	Wencerom Benedict "Wency" C. Lagumbay	3rd district	Nacionalista
City councilors	Don De Leon	3rd district	SBP
City councilors	Anton Reyes	3rd district	NPC
City councilors	Maria Imelda "Imee" A. Rillo	4th district	Lakas
City councilors	Irene R. Belmonte	4th district	SBP
City councilors	Ma. Aurora "Marra" C. Suntay	4th district	SBP
City councilors	Raquel Malañgen	4th district	Lakas
City councilors	Egay Yap	4th district	SBP
City councilors	Nanette Castelo-Daza	4th district	Lakas
City councilors	Joseph Visaya	5th district	SBP
City councilors	Mutya Castelo	5th district	Lakas
City councilors	Alfred Vargas	5th district	SBP
City councilors	Shaira "Shay" L. Liban	5th district	SBP
City councilors	Ramon Vicente "Ram" V. Medalla	5th district	SBP
City councilors	Aiko Melendez	5th district	SBP
City councilors	Eric Z. Medina	6th district	SBP
City councilors	Ellie Juan	6th district	SBP
City councilors	Kristine Alexia Matias	6th district	SBP
City councilors	Banjo Pilar	6th district	SBP
City councilors	Vito Sotto Generoso	6th district	SBP
City councilors	Victor Bernardo	6th district	SBP
ABC President	Jose Maria "Mari" M. Rodriguez (Laging Handa)		Nonpartisan
SK Federation President	Jhon Angelli "Sami" Neri (Damayan)		Nonpartisan

21st City Council (2019-2022)
Position	Name	District	Party
Presiding officer	Gian Carlo G. Sotto		SBP
City councilors	Alex Bernard R. Cruz-Herrera	1st district	SBP
City councilors	Lena Marie "Mayen" P. Juico	1st district	SBP
City councilors	Dorothy "Doray" A. Delarmente	1st district	SBP
City councilors	Tany Joe "TJ" L. Calalay	1st district	SBP
City councilors	Nicole Ella "Nikki" V. Crisologo	1st district	PDP–Laban
City councilors	Victor "Jun" V. Ferrer, Jr.	1st district	SBP
City councilors	Winston "Winnie" T. Castelo	2nd district	SBP
City councilors	Voltaire Godofredo "Bong" L. Liban III	2nd district	SBP
City councilors	Eden Delilah "Candy" Medina-Atienza	2nd district	SBP
City councilors	Ramon "Toto" P. Medalla	2nd district	SBP
City councilors	Fernando Miguel "Mikey" F. Belmonte	2nd district	SBP
City councilors	Estrella "Star" C. Valmocina	2nd district	SBP
City councilors	Franz S. Pumaren	3rd district	SBP
City councilors	Kate Abigael G. Coseteng	3rd district	SBP
City councilors	Matias John T. Defensor	3rd district	SBP
City councilors	Wencerom Benedict "Wency" C. Lagumbay	3rd district	Nacionalista
City councilors	Jorge L. Banal	3rd district	SBP
City councilors	Oryza Shelley "Peachy" V. de Leon	3rd district	SBP
City councilors	Maria Imelda "Imee" A. Rillo	4th district	SBP
City councilors	Ma. Aurora "Marra" C. Suntay	4th district	SBP
City councilors	Irene R. Belmonte	4th district	SBP
City councilors	Restituto "Resty" B. Malañgen	4th district	SBP
City councilors	Ivy Xenia L. Lagman	4th district	SBP
City councilors	Hero Clarence M. Bautista	4th district	SBP
City councilors	Jose "Joe" A. Visaya	5th district	SBP
City councilors	Karl Edgar C. Castelo	5th district	SBP
City councilors	Patrick Michael "PM" D. Vargas	5th district	SBP
City councilors	Shiara "Shay" L. Liban	5th district	SBP
City councilors	Ramon Vicente "Ram" V. Medalla	5th district	SBP
City councilors	Allan Butch T. Francisco	5th district	SBP
City councilors	Ma. Victoria "Marivic" Co-Pilar	6th district	SBP
City councilors	Melencio "Bobby" T. Castelo Jr.	6th district	SBP
City councilors	Rogelio "Roger" P. Juan	6th district	SBP
City councilors	Diorella Marie "Lala" G. Sotto-Antonio	6th district	SBP
City councilors	Donato "Donny" C. Matias	6th district	SBP
City councilors	Eric Z. Medina	6th district	SBP
ABC President	Alfredo S. Roxas (Kaligayahan)		Nonpartisan
SK Federation President	Noe Lorenzo B. Dela Fuente III		Nonpartisan

8th City Council (1964-1967)
Position	Name
Presiding officer	Mariano Sta. Romana
City councilors	Florentino Lapuz
City councilors	Romulo Lucasan
City councilors	Rafael Mison, Jr.
City councilors	Luisa Orendain
City councilors	Eduardo Paredes
City councilors	Proceso Sebastian
City councilors	Saturnino Bermudez
City councilors	Conrado Benitez

7th City Council (1959-1963)
Position	Name
Presiding officer	Vicente O. Novales
City councilors	Carlos L. Albert
City councilors	Conrado Benitez
City councilors	Victorio Diamonon
City councilors	Proceso Sebastian
City councilors	Jose G. Narcelles
City councilors	Vidal Tan
City councilors	Pedro Tuazon
City councilors	Anastacio Yabut

6th City Council (1954-1959)
Position	Name
Presiding officer	Ysidro Guevarra
City councilors	Anacleto S. Madrilejo
City councilors	Lucas R. Pascual
City councilors	Martin S. Manahan
City councilors	Romulo G. Lucasan
City councilors	Nicanor A. Ramirez
City councilors	Reynaldo T. Ermita
City councilors	Felipe Cabrera
City councilors	Benjamin Paguia
City councilors	Gregorio P. Veluz
City councilors	Jesus M. Ponce
City councilors	Luciano M. Dominguez
City councilors	Isabelo T. Crisostomo

5th City Council (1950-1953)
Position	Name
Presiding officer	Francisco Batacan
City councilors	Ramon Vicencio
City councilors	Claro Pinga
City councilors	Jose P. Cruz
City councilors	Delfin Garcia
City councilors	Francisco Batacan
City councilors	Adolfo Eufemio
City councilors	Ponciano S. Reyes
City councilors	Jesus B. Meritt
City councilors	Melencio S. Nadonga
City councilors	Enrique T. Ramirez
City councilors	Rafael B. Icasiano

4th City Council (1949-1950)
Position	Name
Presiding officer	Gregorio B. Roxas
Presiding officer	Francisco Batacan
City councilors	Leon Malubay
City councilors	Ramon Vicencio
City councilors	Luis Sianghio
City councilors	Claro R. Pinga
City councilors	Pablo Pablo

3rd City Council (1947-1949)
Position	Name
Presiding officer	Matias Defensor
Presiding officer	Gregorio Roxas
Presiding officer	Francisco P. Batacan
City councilors	Leon Malubay
City councilors	Hipolito Lopez
City councilors	Ramon Vicencio
City councilors	Gregorio B. Roxas

2nd City Council (1939-1942)
Position	Name
Presiding officer	Ponciano Bernardo
City councilors	Eusebio Aguilar
City councilors	Jose Paez
City councilors	Alejandro Roces, Sr.

1st City Council (1939)
Position	Name
Presiding officer	Vicente Fragante
City councilors	Eusebio Aguilar
City councilors	Jose Paez
City councilors	Alejandro Roces, Sr.

== Prominent members ==
- Ponciano Bernardo – engineer, former Quezon City mayor
- Herbert Bautista – actor, former Quezon City mayor
- Joy Belmonte – Quezon City mayor, former vice mayor
- Bernadette Herrera – House of Representatives member for Bagong Henerasyon
- Aiko Melendez – actress
- Francis Pangilinan – Senator
- Franz Pumaren – basketball coach, House of Representatives member for Quezon City's 3rd district
- Lala Sotto – Movie and Television Review and Classification Board chairperson, television host
- Anjo Yllana – actor-comedian and host
- Roderick Paulate – actor-comedian and host
- Gian Sotto - incumbent Quezon City Vice Mayor
