= Gian Sotto =

Filipino politician

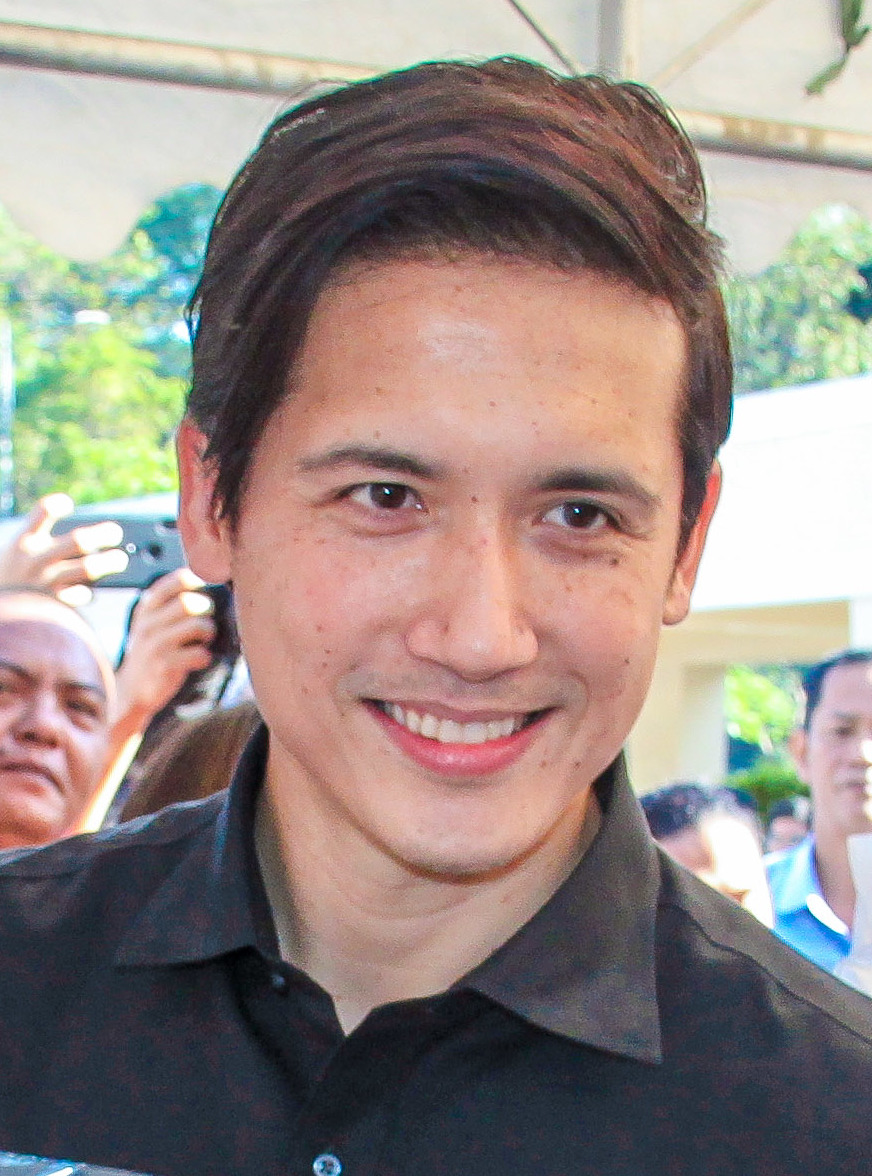
- Sotto in 2020

18th Vice Mayor of Quezon City
- Incumbent
- Assumed office June 30, 2019
- Mayor: Joy Belmonte
- Preceded by: Joy Belmonte

Member of Quezon City Council from the Quezon City's 3rd District
- In office June 30, 2010 – June 30, 2019

Personal details
- Born: Gian Carlo Gamboa Sotto; March 18, 1978 (age 48) Makati, Philippines
- Party: SBP (2018–present)
- Other political affiliations: PDP–Laban (2017–2018); Liberal (2009–2017)
- Spouse: Joy Woolbright (m. 2007)
- Children: 6
- Parents: Tito Sotto (father); Helen Gamboa (mother)
- Relatives: Sotto family
- Education: University of Asia and the Pacific (BS)
- Occupation: Politician, actor, entrepreneur, band vocalist

Gian Carlo Gamboa Sotto (Tagalog pronunciation: [ˈsɔtɔ]; born March 18, 1978) is a Filipino actor and politician who has served as the 18th vice mayor of Quezon City since 2019, under the mayoralty of Joy Belmonte. A member of the local Serbisyo sa Bayan Party, Sotto previously served as a member of the Quezon City Council from 2010 to 2019.

== Early life ==
Gian Carlo Gamboa Sotto was born on March 18, 1978, to celebrities Tito Sotto and Helen Gamboa. Belonging to the Sotto family of Philippine entertainment and politics, he is a great grandson of former Senator Vicente Sotto. He is also the nephew of actor and television personality Vic Sotto, making him a first cousin of actor Oyo Sotto and Pasig Mayor Vico Sotto.

== Education and corporate career ==
Sotto completed his elementary education at Ateneo de Manila Grade School in 1993 and his secondary education at Colegio de San Juan de Letran in 1997. He earned his Entrepreneurial Management degree from the University of Asia and the Pacific in 2001. He worked for Autohaus under its marketing department in 2001.

== Entertainment career ==
Sotto had several acting stints in films, notably appearing alongside his uncle Vic Sotto's box-office hits and at television being formerly part of ABS-CBN's talent management Star Magic from 2007 to 2009. He previously worked as an actor on GMA Network and later under MZET Production from 2006 to 2009.

Sotto also became active as the vocalist of the prominent record label Ivory Music's rock band Nerveline.

== Political career ==
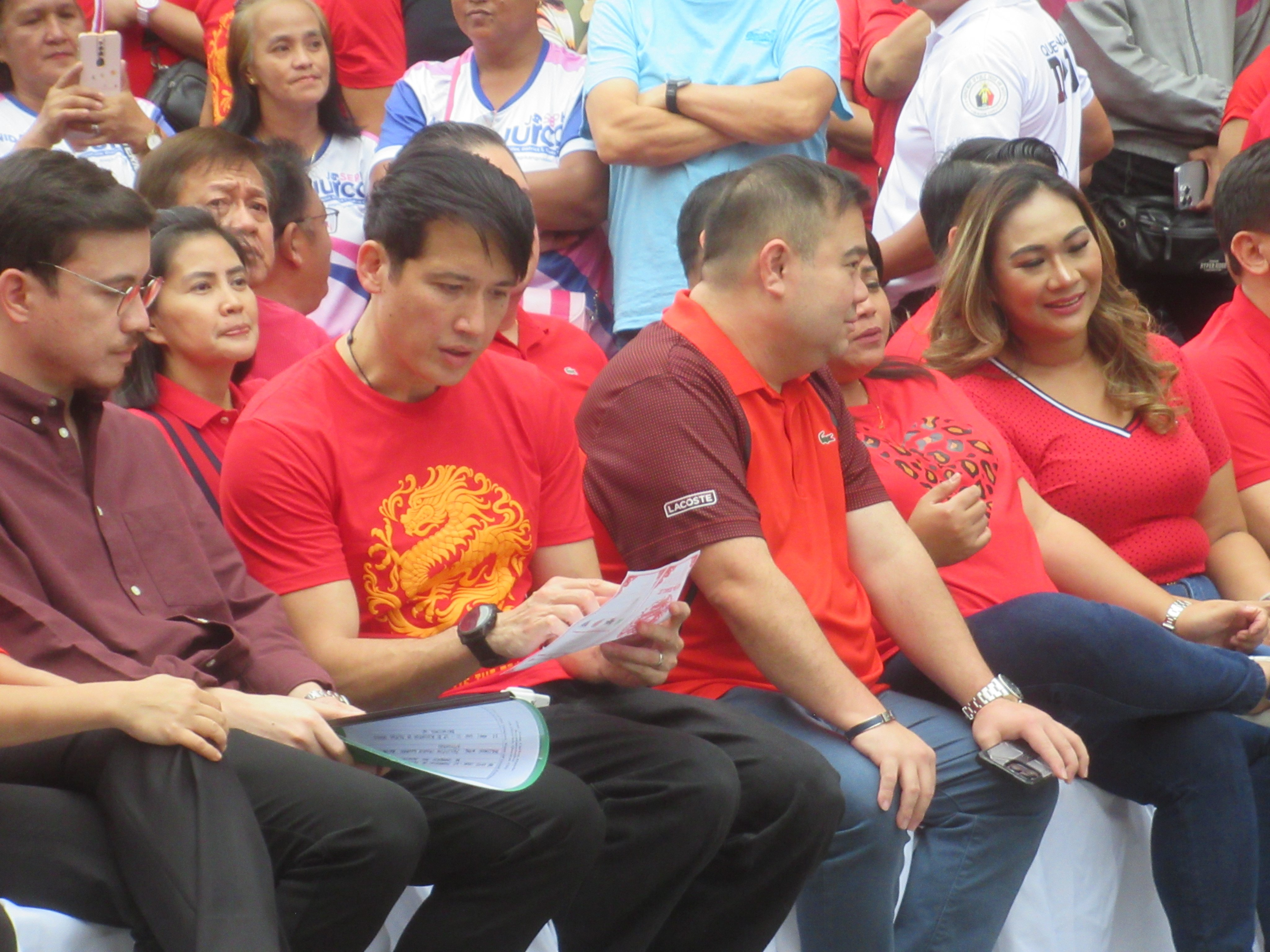
Sotto and Rep. Arjo Atayde (QC–1st) during the 2024 Chinese New Year festival in Quezon City's Chinatown district

In 2010, Sotto was elected to the Quezon City Council as a councilor from the third district. He was a member of the Liberal Party until he switched parties, joining PDP–Laban on May 10, 2017. As councilor, he served as the chairman of the Committee on Parks and Environment Protection Committee and of the Committee on Anti-Illegal drugs. He would continue serving as councilor until 2019, where he was term-limited.

In 2019, Sotto ran for vice mayor of Quezon City as the running mate of Joy Belmonte. He entered a field of five candidates, which included fellow television personalities Roderick Paulate and Jopet Sison. On May 13, 2019, Sotto narrowly defeated his closest opponent —Sison— to become the city's eighteenth vice mayor. He was sworn in on June 30, 2019. Sotto was re-elected to his second consecutive term in 2022.

As vice mayor, he presides the Quezon City Council and also has the right to vote to break ties if there are disputes in ordinance proposals.

== Personal life ==
Sotto is married to Joy Woolbright-Sotto, whom he met as a fellow student at the University of Asia and the Pacific. The couple tied the knot in 2007. They have six children. Beyond politics, Sotto is a Christian, attending Victory Christian Fellowship services, and is also an actor, writer and producer.

== Electoral history ==
Electoral history of Gian Sotto
Year	Office	Party		Votes received				Result
Year	Office	Local	National	Total	%	P.	Swing	Result
2010	Councilor (Quezon City–3rd)	—N/a	Liberal	34,948	6.76%	5th	—N/a	Won
2013	Councilor (Quezon City–3rd)	—N/a	Liberal	53,260	12.12%	2nd	+5.36	Won
2016	Councilor (Quezon City–3rd)	—N/a	Liberal	58,661	12.00%	2nd	-0.12	Won
2019	Vice Mayor of Quezon City	SBP	—N/a	382,393	44.90%	1st	—N/a	Won
2022	Vice Mayor of Quezon City	SBP	—N/a	594,170	56.51%	1st	+11.61	Won
2025	Vice Mayor of Quezon City	SBP	—N/a	938,686	93.48%	1st	+36.97	Won
