= Joy Belmonte =

Filipino politician (born 1970)

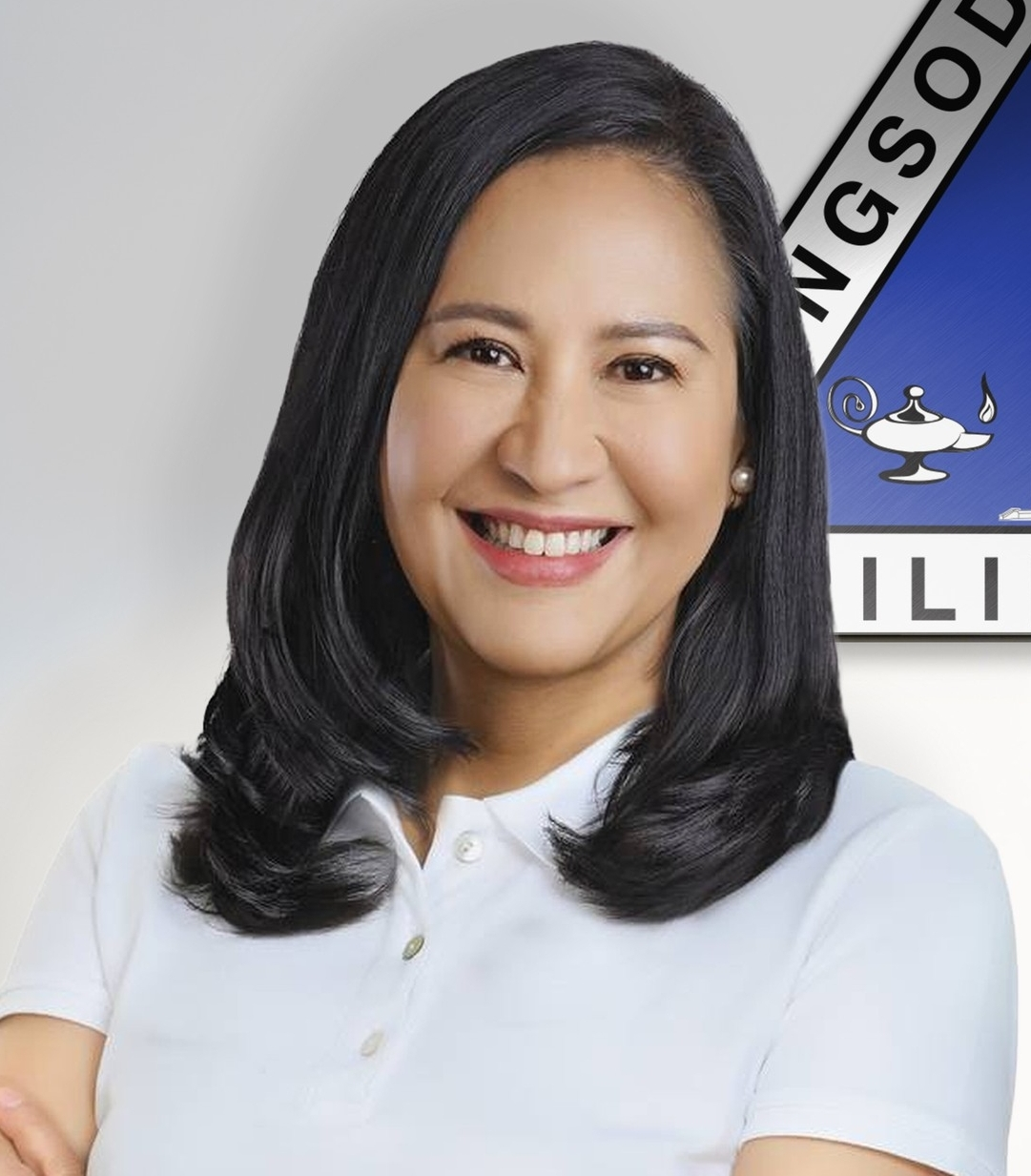
- Official portrait, 2025

12th Mayor of Quezon City
- Incumbent
- Assumed office June 30, 2019
- Vice Mayor: Gian Sotto
- Preceded by: Herbert Bautista

17th Vice Mayor of Quezon City
- In office June 30, 2010 – June 30, 2019
- Mayor: Herbert Bautista
- Preceded by: Herbert Bautista
- Succeeded by: Gian Sotto

Personal details
- Born: Maria Josefina Tanya Go Belmonte; March 15, 1970 (age 56) Quezon City, Philippines
- Party: SBP (2018–present)
- Other political affiliations: PFP (2018–2021); PDP–Laban (2017–2018); Liberal (2009–2017)
- Spouse: Raymund Alimurung
- Children: 1
- Parent(s): Feliciano Belmonte Jr. (father); Betty Go-Belmonte (mother)
- Education: Ateneo de Manila University (BA); University of Leicester (MA); University College London (MA)

Maria Josefina Tanya "Joy" Go Belmonte-Alimurung (born March 15, 1970) is a Filipino politician who has served as the 12th mayor of Quezon City since 2019. A member of the local Serbisyo sa Bayan Party, Belmonte previously served as the vice mayor of Quezon City from 2010 to 2019 under her predecessor, Herbert Bautista.

== Early life and education ==
Born Maria Josefina Tanya Go Belmonte on March 15, 1970, in Quezon City. She is the only daughter of journalist Betty Go-Belmonte and lawyer Feliciano Belmonte Jr., who would later serve as the 9th Mayor of Quezon City, a representative from Quezon City's 4th congressional district, and House Speaker. She has three brothers: Isaac Belmonte, the current head of the editorial board of The Philippine Star, Kevin Belmonte, the vice-chairman of Nuvoland Philippines, and Miguel Belmonte, the current president and CEO of The Philippine Star. Her first cousin, Kit Belmonte, was the representative of Quezon City's 6th congressional district from 2013 to 2022.

She attended Saint Pedro Poveda College for her grade school and high school education, where she became the first student council chairman of the school. She graduated with a Jose Segovia Award for Service and Gerry Roxas Award.

In 1992, Belmonte graduated from the Ateneo de Manila University with a Bachelor of Arts in Social Sciences. Afterwards, in 1995, she took up her graduate studies in the University of Leicester where she earned her master's degree in Museum Studies.

In 1996, she again took up her graduate studies at University College London where she earned her master's degree in Archaeology. For the duration of her masters program, she focused on studying about Southeast Asia and its culture, which led her to take up an internship in Thailand. She became an archeologist, and eventually ended up teaching the subject in the Philippines.

== Political career ==
=== 2010–2019: Vice Mayor of Quezon City ===
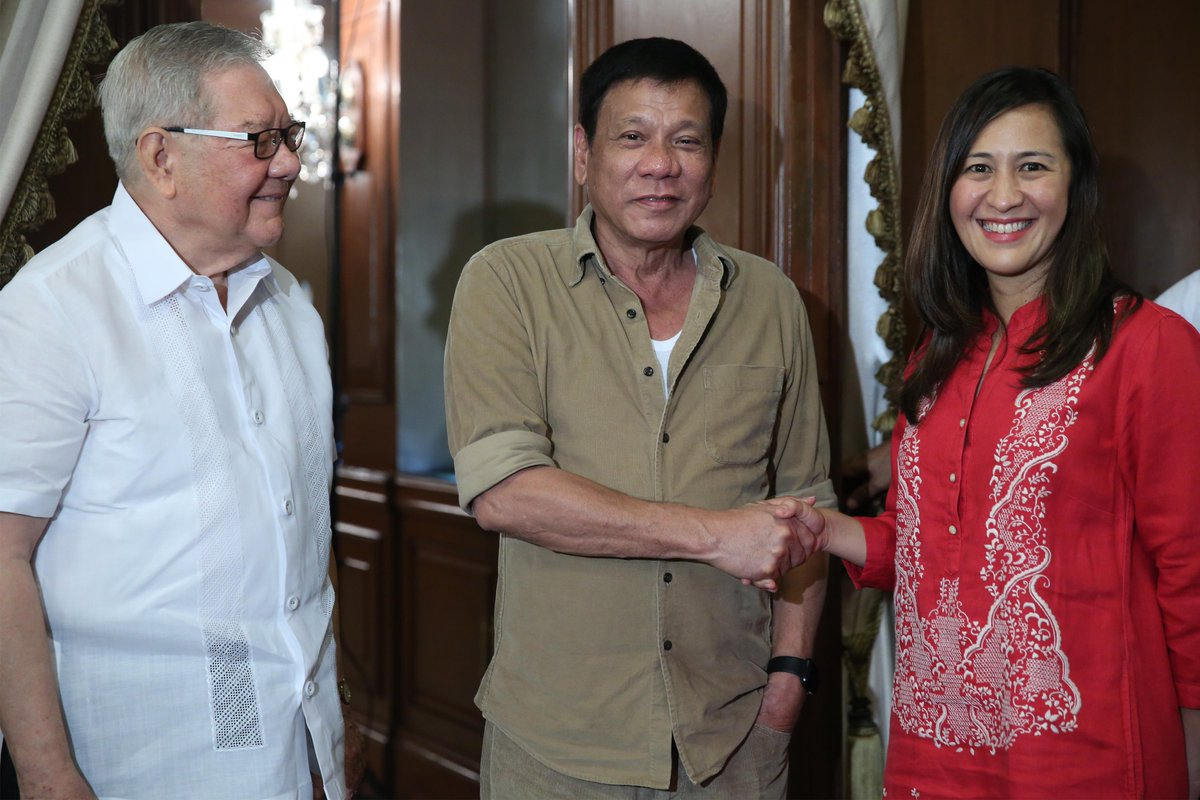
Joy Belmonte (right) with President Rodrigo Duterte (middle) along with Sonny Belmonte (left). July 2018

In 2009, Belmonte placed a bid to run for Vice Mayor of Quezon City in 2010 as the running mate of outgoing Vice Mayor Herbert Bautista. She was sworn in as a new member of the Liberal Party in November 2009, alongside her father and Bautista, in support of the presidential run of Senator Benigno Aquino III. She won the elections, with Bautista dominating the mayoralty race, and assumed office on June 30, 2010. She was reelected in 2013 and in 2016. She was also a major backer of the successful 2016 vice presidential campaign of Leni Robredo.

On May 10, 2017, Belmonte took oath as a new member of the ruling PDP–Laban, the party of President Rodrigo Duterte, after leaving the Liberal Party. On July 27, Belmonte made headlines when she was in-charge as acting mayor during a monsoon because she refused to suspend classes early but still did when the students were stranded already. She predicted that "there would be only light rains" based on a bulletin contrary to what happened. Belmonte said she acknowledges her "shortcomings in this situation", and stated that the residents "'deserve a better leader" because of the incident.

On November 6, 2018, the "Batas QC" was launched, spearheaded by Belmonte. This initiative is the first mobile application in the Philippines to feature local ordinances. Its aim is to raise awareness regarding the rules and the corresponding penalties of non-compliance in order to minimize the violations among the people in the city.

In February 2019, Belmonte was accused of graft by Manuel Morato, a former chairman of the Philippine Charity Sweepstakes Office. Belmonte denied the accusations and filed a libel case against 11 people including Morato.

=== 2019–present: Mayor of Quezon City ===
On February 14, 2018, she announced that she intends to run for the mayoral position of Quezon City in the 2019 local elections. She had agreed to run under the Hugpong ng Pagbabago with incumbent councilor and actor Gian Sotto as her running mate. She was also among the pioneer members of Partido Federal ng Pilipinas when the party was officially launched in October 2018.

Her platform included furthering women's rights, adding closed-circuit television cameras along streets, improving the documentation of public projects, and an intensified anti-drug campaign. The platform was created with the help of 50 experts in multiple fields. Other more concrete points of her platform included child-minding centers, creating homes for abandoned senior citizens, a 24/7 emergency hotline, and discounts for solo parents and PWDs. Joy also signed a covenant with women leaders of the Quezon City Community Women Leaders’ Federation. This covenant assured adherence to the points of the Quezon City Community Women Leaders’ Federation ten-point agenda, such as having a specialty clinic for women illnesses and mental health and a livelihood training center for women entrepreneurs.

She won against her closest rival, then-incumbent 1st District representative Vincent Crisologo, in a large margin and was proclaimed the 11th Mayor of Quezon City.

On her first months in office, she led road-clearing operations on city roads through the creation of the "Task Force 60 Days" following the 60-day directive to all local executive chiefs given by then president Rodrigo Duterte. Belmonte had also asked for an extension of the deadline, stating that Quezon City is "too large" for the mandate to be done within the required duration.

In September 2019, she ordered to relocate a monument dedicated to former Senator Benigno Aquino Jr. at the intersection of Quezon Avenue and Timog Avenue for road-widening with the consent of the Aquino family. Stalls inside the Quezon City Memorial Circle were also dismantled. She also created the "Task Force on Solid Waste Collection, Cleaning, and Disposal Services Management".

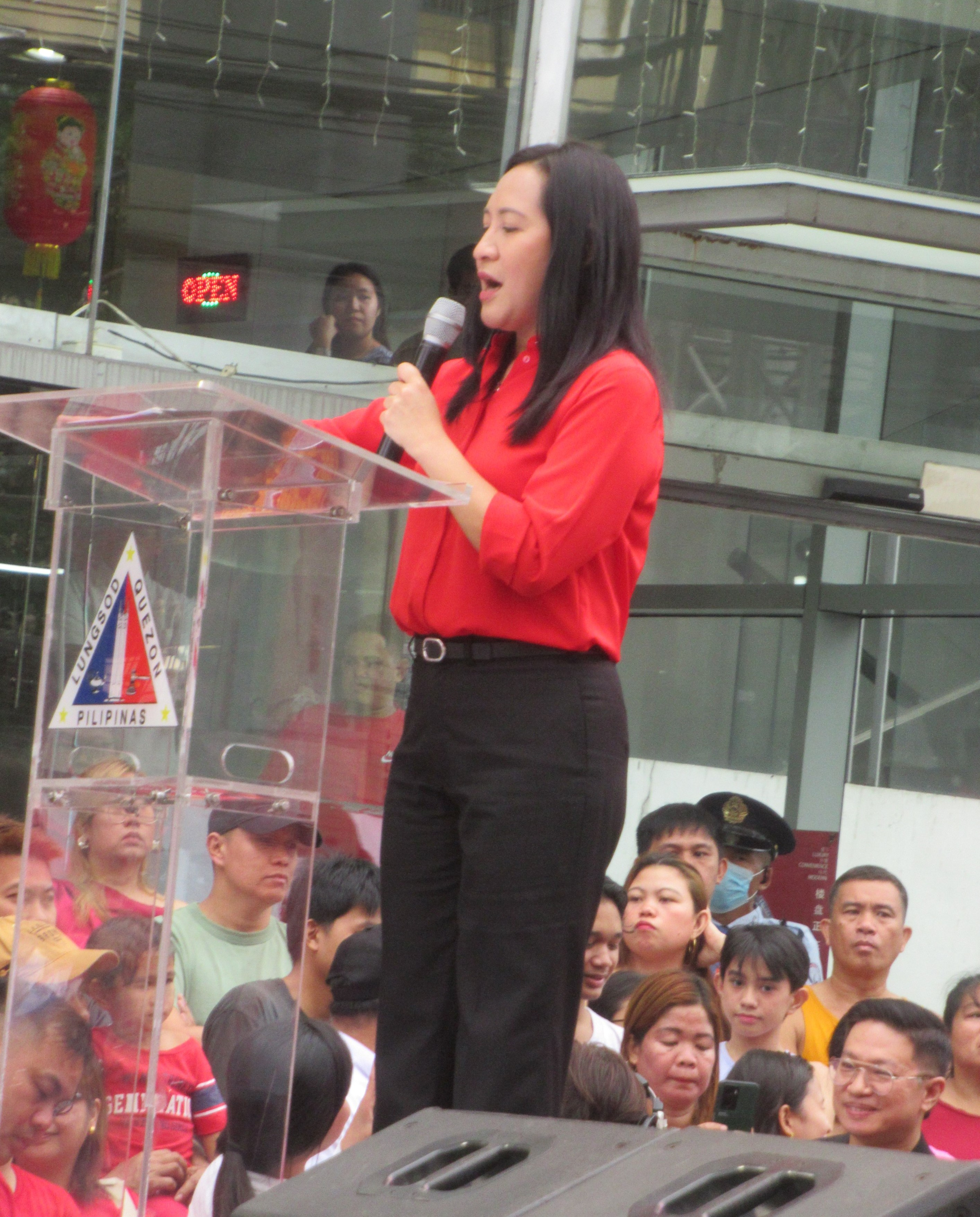
Belmonte in 2024 Chinese New Year festival

Belmonte took charge of Quezon City's COVID-19 pandemic response beginning in 2020. Free COVID-19 tests were made available for its residents and workers and the city's molecular laboratory was built for speedy release of coronavirus test results. The local government had also provided financial aid to employees of high-risk establishments affected by lockdowns, and care kits to closed-care setting facilities grappling with virus outbreaks. Controversies during this period included a chaotic and overcrowded distribution of supplemental aid in April 2021 and the mauling by local officials of a fish vendor that was not wearing a face mask outdoors in 2020. She also gave Quezon City Task Force Disiplina head Rannie Ludovica, who posted a "shoot-to-kill" threat online against quarantine violators, a "second chance" despite calling his statement "appalling."

She was re-elected to her second consecutive term in 2022 through a landslide victory, defeating her closest rival, AnaKalusugan party-list representative Mike Defensor.

== Controversies ==
=== Delivering relief goods using garbage truck ===
In March 2020, amidst of COVID-19 pandemic in the Philippines and lockdowns was enforced, the relief goods was distributed in Pasong Tamo, but it was loaded from a garbage truck. Belmonte was later criticized in social media, and some of the personalities who questioned it was comedian Kitkat, and manager Ogie Diaz. But in some barangays were safely loaded in a service van. The city government later denied the issue, and later stated that the truck used was only a utility truck. The summit express later tagged it as fake news.

== Personal life ==
Belmonte married Raymond Alimurung, the first Filipino CEO of Lazada Philippines. They have a son.

In 2010, she was awarded the Gawad Lingkod Masa Award by Gabriela Women's Party due to her work on protecting and helping out distressed women.

== Electoral history ==
Electoral history of Joy Belmonte
Year	Office	Party		Votes received				Result
Year	Office	Local	National	Total	%	P.	Swing	Result
2010	Vice Mayor of Quezon City	—N/a	Liberal	503,657	69.98%	1st	—N/a	Won
2013	Vice Mayor of Quezon City	—N/a	Liberal	546,707	78.49%	1st	+8.51	Won
2016	Vice Mayor of Quezon City	—N/a	Liberal	736,274	80.73%	1st	+2.24	Won
2019	Mayor of Quezon City	SBP	PFP	469,480	54.09%	1st	—N/a	Won
2022	Mayor of Quezon City	SBP	—N/a	662,611	60.43%	1st	+6.34	Won
2025	Mayor of Quezon City	SBP	—N/a	1,030,730	95.96%	1st	+35.53	Won

Political offices
Preceded by Herbert Bautista	Vice Mayor of Quezon City; 2010–2019	Succeeded by Gian Sotto
Preceded by Herbert Bautista	Mayor of Quezon City; 2019–present	Incumbent
