= Koshe (disambiguation) =

Koshe is a large open landfill in Addis Ababa, Ethiopia.

Koshe may also refer to:

- 2017 Koshe landslide, a garbage landslide at the Koshe Garbage Dump
- Koshe, Ethiopia, a town in central Ethiopia
