= 2017 Koshe landslide =

Garbage landslide in Addis Ababa, Ethiopia

- 2017 Koshe landslide (Ethiopia)
- Date: 11 March 2017
- Location: Koshe, Addis Ababa, Ethiopia
- Cause: Landslide from garbage piling
- Deaths: 115

On 11 March 2017, a garbage landslide at the Koshe Garbage Dump in Addis Ababa, Ethiopia killed 115 people. Koshe (alternatively spelled Quoshee or Repi), derived from the Amharic word for 'dirty', had hundreds of people living in unincorporated communities beneath the 50-year-old garbage dump's unstable mounds. Both shanty houses and concrete structures were built in Koshe by residents attracted to the area's cheap cost-of-living and availability of recyclables to collect for income. Destabilized by constant human interaction, a segment of one of the garbage mounds collapsed during the evening onto one of Koshe's communities.

== Landslide ==
The landslide occurred Saturday evening at 20:00 as many people were inside of their homes. A large garbage mound collapsed onto a neighborhood of about 150 people, sliding into the community with enough force destroy brick and concrete structures as well as shanty houses.

Garbage landslides are particularly deadly because buried victims are often quickly suffocated by landfill gases like methane and carbon dioxide, in addition to temperatures within decomposing mounds easily reaching 140 °F (60 °C) or higher. Six excavators were hired by authorities to clear away rubble in the search for survivors or victims Emergency officials rescued 37 people in the immediate aftermath of the landslide, but struggled to reach dozens more buried beneath the black dirt and debris. Despite the inhospitable environment, another man was rescued from beneath the collapsed mound two days after the slide. Officials redeployed excavators from across Addis Ababa to help search efforts.

The garbage landslide killed at least 115 people and left dozens of others missing. Speculation by locals in the immediate aftermath blamed the landslides on new garbage dumping in the area after a several-year cessation, and bulldozers used in construction of a nearby biogas plant for packing down and shaking the area's dirt, possibly destabilizing the garbage mounds in the process.

== Government response ==
The response to the landslide by Ethiopia's government underscored public outrage over the impoverished conditions of Koshe, prompting policy changes in housing and construction. Ethiopia's Communications Minister Negeri Lencho announced the creation of investigative committee had been created to determine the cause of the landslide. 56 families were moved to temporary government housing in Koshe's Nifas Silk Sub-City and Kolfe Keranio Sub-City as part of resettlement efforts with plans to eventually permanently resettle them. Additionally, plans were made to convert the disaster site into an open-air park. But Koshe's makeshift communities remained populated when another landslide struck in June 2019, killing a man.

== See also ==
- 2017 Meethotamulla landslide
- 2015 Shenzhen landslide
