= Kolonnawa =

Kolonnawa කොළොන්නාව கொலன்னாவ
- town
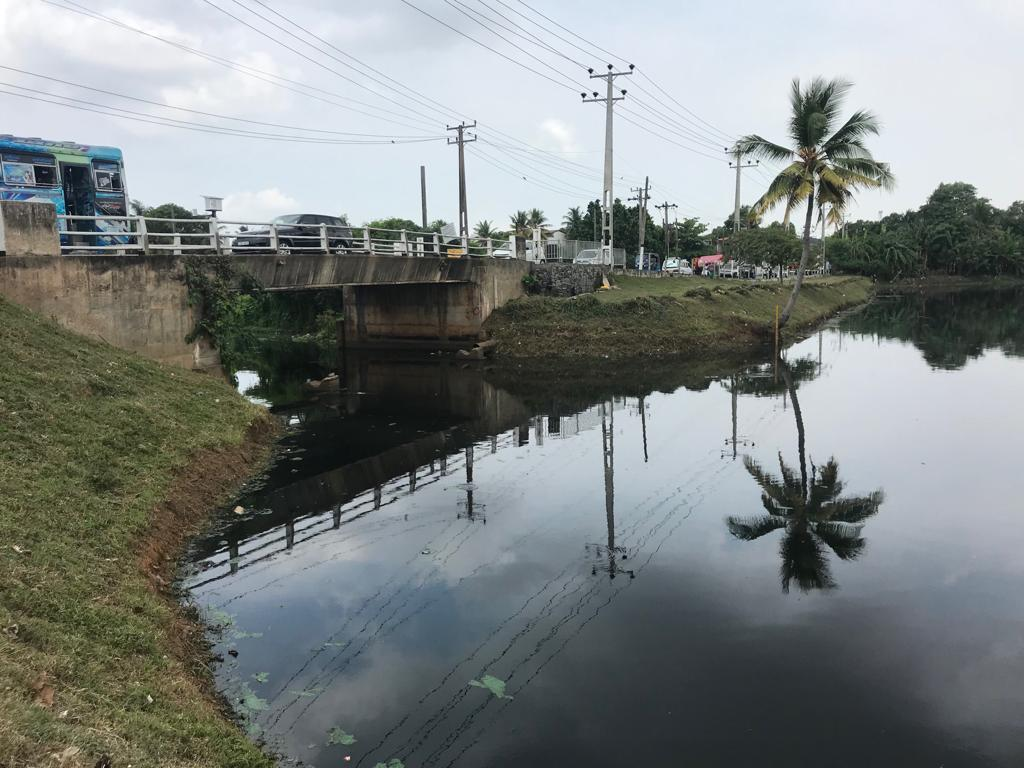
- Kelani River in Kolonnawa

- Location in Colombo District
- Coordinates: 6°55′42″N 79°53′42″E
- Country: Sri Lanka
- Province: Western Province
- District: Colombo District

Area
  - Total: 10.06 km^{2} (3.88 sq mi)

Population (2024)
  - Total: 59,425
  - Density: 5,907/km^{2} (15,300/sq mi)
- Time zone: +5.30

Kolonnawa (Sinhala: කොලොන්නාව, Tamil: கொலன்னாவ) is a town located on the eastern boundary of Colombo in Colombo District, Western Province, Sri Lanka. It is bounded by Kelani River to the north, and borders Colombo to the west, Sri Jayawardenepura Kotte to the south, and the Kotikawatta-Mulleriyawa to the east. According to the 2024 census, it had a population of 59,425.

== History ==
Kolonnawa developed as an industrial and commercial settlement on the eastern outskirts of Colombo. In the early 20th century, it accommodated warehouses and served as accommodation for blue collar workers working in port-related activities and establishments in Colombo. The Kolonnawa Oil Installation was taken over by Ceylon Petroleum Corporation in 1964, following which several improvements and expansions were made to expand the capacity. As of 2017, the facility had a capacity of 221,722 tonnes. During the early 1980s, the food stores at Chalmers Granaries in Colombo were relocated to Kolonnawa. The government further encouraged the relocation of warehouses from Colombo to Kolonnawa following communal clashes in 1983. On 14 April 2017, a landslide happened at the Meethotamulla solid-waste disposal site in Kolonnawa, when a large section of the waste mound collapsed, destroying nearby houses and killing 32 people.

== Geography and administration ==
Kolonnawa is situated in Colombo District, in the Western Province of Sri Lanka. It is located on the eastern boundary of Colombo. It is bound by the Kelani River in the north, and bordered by Colombo to the west, Sri Jayawardenepura Kotte to the south, and the Kotikawatta-Mulleriyawa to the east. The town is located on the flood plains of the Kelani River, and about 70% of the land area is located below the mean sea level. The Harward bund, which was constructed in 1935 to protect Colombo from the flooding of the river, and the urban area of Kolonnwa developed on the south of the bund where construction was permitted. Kolonnawa experienced extensive flooding in May 2016 due to heavy rainfall and high water levels in the Kelani River.

The town is administered by the Kolonnawa Urban Council, established in 1930. The council area covered approximately 10.06 km^{2} (3.88 sq mi) and comprised 11 wards–Sedawatta, Orugodawatta, Wellampitiya, Nagahamulla, Salawatta, Kolonnawa North, Salamulla, Alubowa, Kolonnawa Central, Egoda Kolonnawa, and Meethotamulla.

== Demographics ==
Kolonnawa had a population of 57,984 inhabitants in 1981 which declined to 55,285 in 2001. In 2001, Buddhism was the major religion with 54.6% adherents, followed by Islam (21.2%), Hinduism (16.4%), and Christianity (7.7%). Of the total population, 56.8% were Sinhalese, followed by Sri Lankan Tamils (29.2%), Sri Lankan Moors (19%), Indian Tamils (1.5%) and rest others. According to the 2024 census, the Kolonnawa Urban Council area had a population of 59,425 inhabitants, comprising 29,213 males and 30,212 females.
