= 2017 Meethotamulla landslide =

Garbage landslide in Sri Lanka

- Date: 14 April 2017
- Location: Meethotamulla, Colombo, Sri Lanka; 06°56′15″N 79°53′26″E
- Cause: Landslide due to garbage piling
- Deaths: 32
- Missing: 8
- Property damage: 145 houses destroyed, infrastructure damage

The Meethotamulla landslide was a garbage landslide of a section of the large dump at Meethotamulla in the Colombo District of Sri Lanka.

== Landslide ==
In the morning hours of Sinhalese New Year on 14 April 2017, a large section of the Meethoramulla garbage dump (also sometimes called the Meethotamulla Garbage Mountain) collapsed on surrounding houses. Following the disaster, President Maithripala Sirisena requested the Sri Lanka Armed Forces, Police, and the Disaster Management Centre to provide assistance and relief to the victims.

As per the Disaster Management Centre on 20 April 2017, the landslide caused 32 deaths with 8 more missing, and affected a total of 1,765 people. Following the landslide, Minister Harsha de Silva stated that the garbage dump of 750–1,200 t (1,650,000–2,650,000 lb) daily would be stopped and diverted to two alternative sites, while also highlighting that the Meethotamulla Waste-to-Energy Power Station was only announced a few weeks before the landslide. The 21-acre (85,000 m^{2}) garbage dump site reached a height of 48.5 m (159 ft) before collapsing.

== Investigation ==
President Maithripala Sirisena appointed a Presidential Commission of Inquiry headed Justice Dr. Chandradasa Nanayakkara, a retired Judge of the Court of Appeal on 26 April 2017. The commission released a report on 26 October 2017. The report found then Colombo Municipal Commissioner V. K. A. Anura failed to take "necessary action to avert the garbage dump collapse despite he being informed by the officials on the looming threat well in advance". Anura was removed from office early 2018 based on the recommendation of the Presidential Commission.

The Auditor General issued a report in May 2018 on an audit carried out by his department on the matter, which found the Colombo Municipal Council (CMC) responsible for the death of 32 people and for the damage caused to properties as a result of the collapse of the Meethotamulla garbage dump. It found the CMC responsible for not properly disposing waste and not properly carrying out payment of compensation for the effected. It was further revealed that the CMC continued to dump waste at the site even after a court order prevented it in 2009. The report recommended that the Municipal Ordinance be amended and proper waste management processes be implemented.

== See also ==
2017 Koshe landslide

2015 Shenzhen landslide
