= Payatas =

Barangay in Quezon City, Metro Manila, Philippines

Payatas Barangay 8
- Barangay
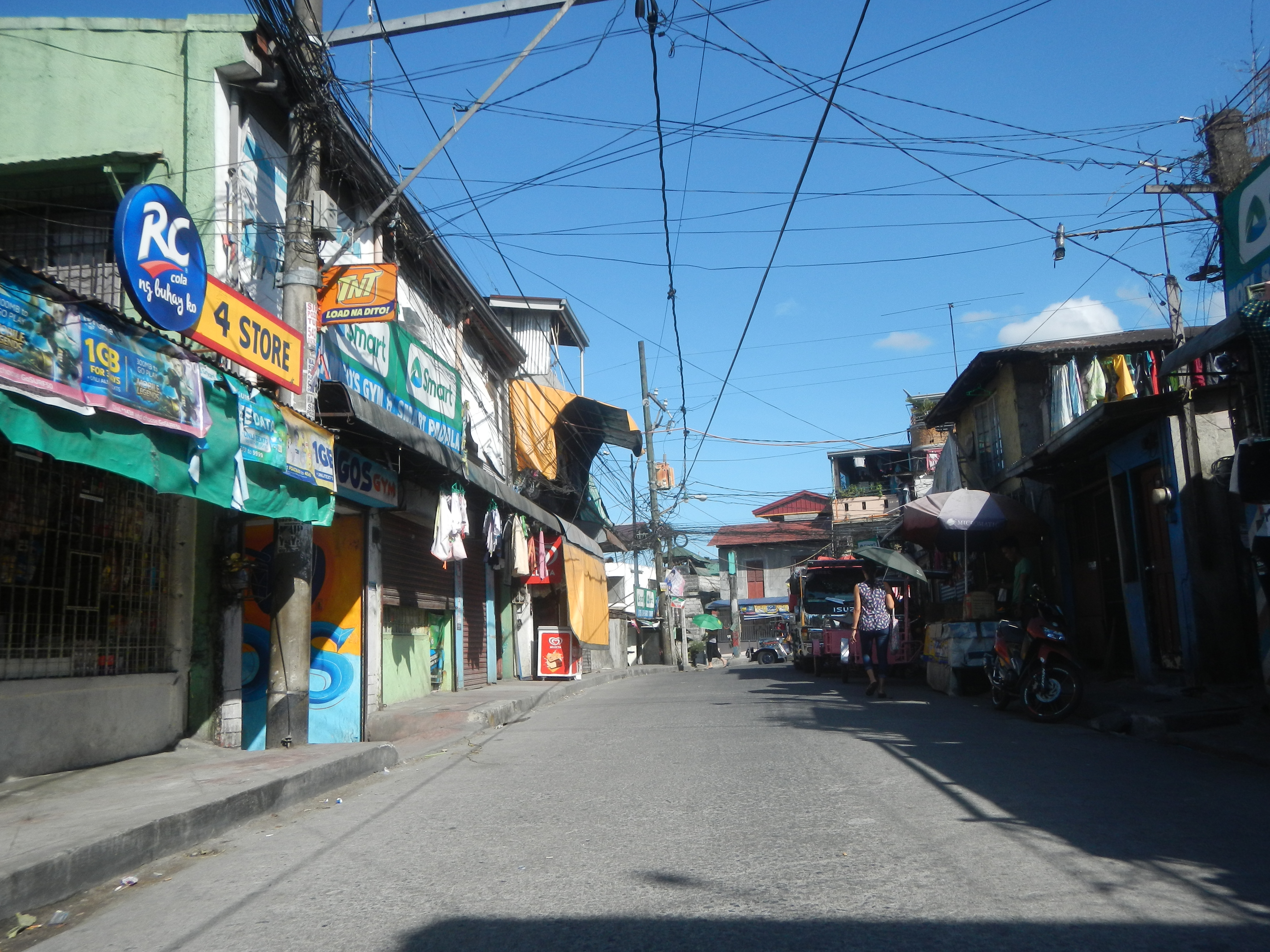
- Street of the barangay

- Seal

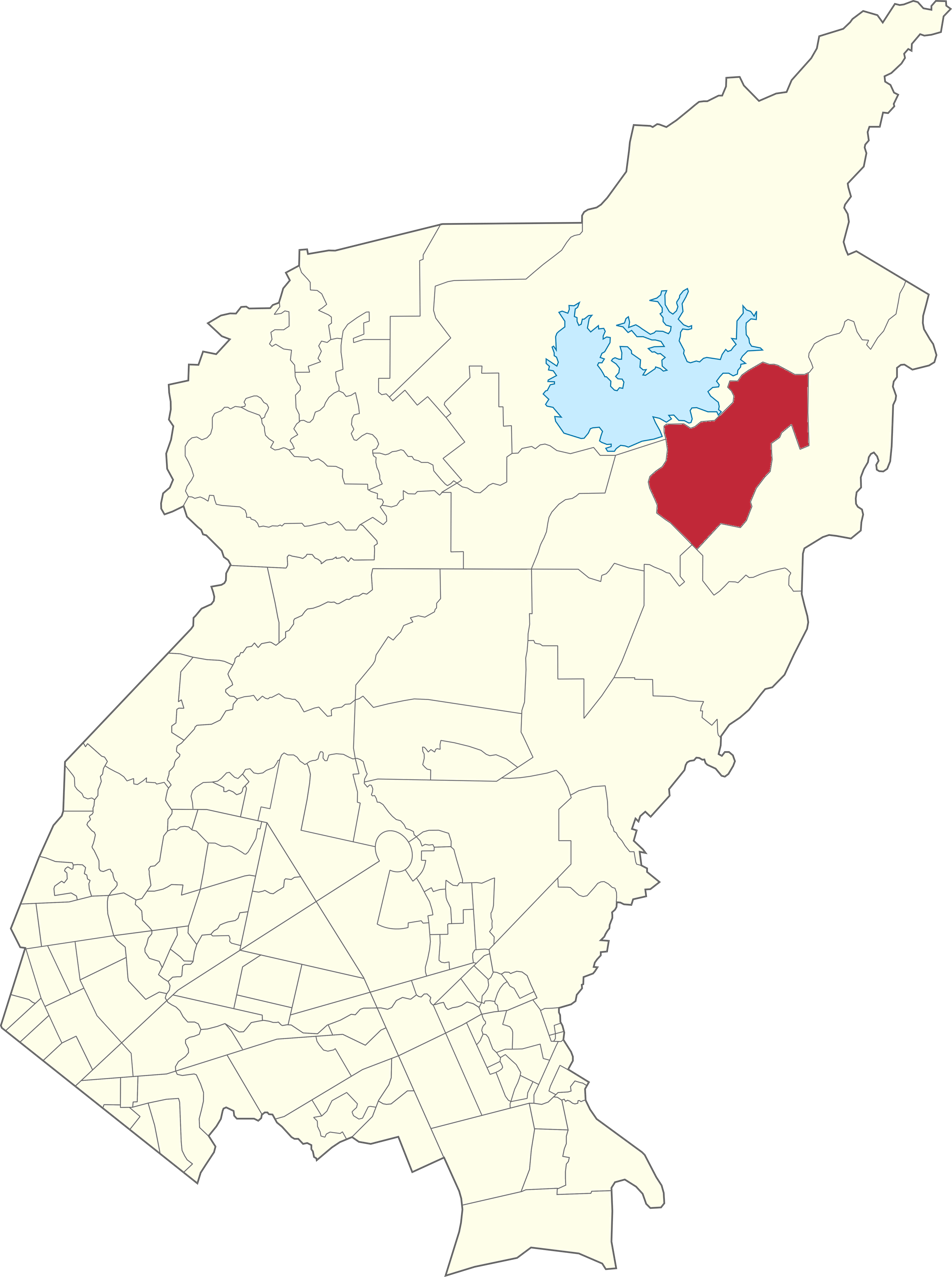
- Map of Quezon City showing Payatas

- Location of Payatas within Metro Manila
- Coordinates: 14°42′35.6″N 121°5′58.8″E
- Country: Philippines
- Region: National Capital Region
- City: Quezon City
- District: 2nd District of Quezon City
- Established: 1976

Government
  - Type: Barangay
  - Barangay Captain: Rascal D. Doctor

Area
  - Total: 7.74 km^{2} (2.99 sq mi)

Population (2020)
  - Total: 139,740
  - Density: 18,054.26/km^{2} (46,760.3/sq mi)
- Time zone: UTC+8 (PST)
- Postal Code: 1119
- Area code: 2
- Website: Facebook

Payatas is an administrative division in eastern Metro Manila, the Philippines. It is an urban barangay located in the 2nd district of Quezon City adjacent to the barangays of Commonwealth, Batasan Hills and Bagong Silangan.

== Etymology ==
The name Payatas derived from the word payat sa taas (lit. 'thin at the top'), which describes the soil located in the upper part of Tullahan River, unsuitable for planting rice.

== History ==
Payatas was part of San Mateo, Rizal until it was ceded to Quezon City in 1949.

On July 4, 1974, pursuant to Presidential Decree No. 86 as amended Presidential Decree No. 86-A, portion of the community known as ZONE 108 – Commonwealth in Quezon City, which is not a barrio but, having sufficient population and definite jurisdiction, organized itself into a barangay known as Barangay No. 8 and elected an official who took their oath before Hon. Eduardo Soliman Jr.

On September 21, 1974, Presidential Decree No. 557 was promulgated, declaring among other things that in the case of Manila and other chartered cities with no barrios, all existing barangay therein created under Presidential Decree No. 86 as amended by Presidential Decree No. 86-A shall continue as barangays and adopt Republic Act No. 3590.

On June 22, 1975, Resolution No. 75-12 was passed by Barangay Zone 108 consolidating or merging all barangays within the Commonwealth area, including that of Barangay No. 8 (Payatas), resulting in the abolition of the corporate existence and personality of the latter.

In 1976, Barangay Captain Inocencio Deyro of the Barangay Commonwealth, constituted under Resolution No. 75-12 which was already null and void, called a meeting to take place on June 6, 1976. Among the items on the agenda is the appointment of Purok Leaders in Barangay No. 8 (Payatas), seeking to perform an act affecting Barangay No. 8 (Payatas) that is a defiance of the clarification order of the Hon. Judge Augusto L. Valencia. On October 14, Judge Jaime R. Agloro rendered his decision in Special Civil Case No. Q-21577, prohibiting that the respondents, Barangay Captain Inocencio Deyro and the Barangay Commonwealth, interfere with the powers, duties and functions of Barangay No. 8 (Payatas). Barangay No. 8, now called Payatas, was created with definite territorial jurisdiction as confirmed by Judge Augusto L. Valencia in his order dated March 5, 1976. Payatas is the only barangay to date that was created through judicial process.

== Demography ==
As of 2015, children aged 5 to 9 years are the largest age group, making up 11.0 percent of the population. This is followed by those in the age groups 15 to 19 years (10.7 percent), 0 to 4 years and 10 to 14 years (each 10.6 percent).

Males outnumber females in the age group 0 to 54 years and females outnumber males in the age group 55 years old and over.

== Community ==
The population of Barangay Payatas was almost 130,333 in 2015. Most of the residents fall below the poverty level, living under harsh conditions in depressed areas. Payatas has the fastest-growing population in the city. Residents comprise various ethnic groups, the majority from the Northern Luzon. They include Ilokanos, Pangasinan, Novo Ecijanos, Tagalogs, Kapampangan and a small percentage of Ibanags, Itawis and members of Igorot tribes. There are also migrants from Southern-Tagalog parts: Bicolanos, Visayas, Mindanao Region and a small percentage of Muslims.

The main language is Tagalog. English is widely spoken. Waray, Ilonggo, Visaya, Bicol, Ilokano, Pangasinense and Kapampangan are secondary languages commonly used.

Christianity is dominant; most of the Christians are Roman Catholics. There are also a small number of Muslims, Iglesia ni Cristo, Protestants (El Shaddai, Shalom, Born Again, Mormons, Seventh Day Adventists, etc.) and Aglipays.

Most residents lives in semi-concrete homes, with those living near the dumpsite augmenting their houses or shanties with scavenged materials.

While a portion of the area has been developed into residential subdivisions (Don Carlos Heights, Manila Remnants, Doña Nicasia, Empire Subdivision, Capitol Homes II, Amlac Ville Subd., Violago Homes Parkwood Subd., Madrigal Subd., Manahan Subd., Fil-Invest II Mountain View, Villa Gracia Homes, etc.), vast stretches of land remain either underdeveloped or undeveloped because of poor access and lack of services. Many of those areas have evolved into squatter colonies. Areas may contain a mixture of housing sites, commercial and business centers, light industries, civic centers, educational areas and recreational parks.

== Transportation ==
=== Public utility vehicles ===
Jeepneys serve as public transport in the northern areas via Gravel Pit Road plying either Lupang Pangako or Montalban. Approximately 60 units ply these routes. Fare varies depending on distance. There is only one existing jeepney Operators and Drivers Association, which is the Lupang Pangako JODA office.

Tricycles service all other parts of Payatas. There are four registered Tricycle Operators and Drivers Associations, with almost 1,000 units operating from Area A, Area B and Urban Lupang Pangako:

- Payatas Tricycle Operators and Driver's Association (PATODA)
- Litex Payatas Tricycle Operator & Drivers Association (LIPATODA)
- Violago Homes Parkwood Tricycle Operators & Drivers Association (PARKTODA)
- Urban Poor Transportation Services Organization (LPUPPTODA)

Some residents use their own vehicles.

=== Roads ===
Payatas Road is basically the service road for the NGC area but also serves as the main access road to properties situated in the central areas, such as Ilang-Ilang Street to Campsite, Sampaguita Street to Brgy. Bagong Silangan and Everlasting Street to Lower Hasmin.

Gravel Pit Road, originally part of the peripheral road of La Mesa Reservoir, now serves as the sole public road of Northern Payatas Area.

Proposed C-6 is a metro toll way facility that is expected to traverse the area. It is still under study as to its alignment by the PNCC as BOT Project of the DOTC.

Collector roads branch out from the primary roads extending the network into the inner areas. These are mostly Barangay main roads like the following:

1. Ilang-Ilang Streets linking to San Juan Bautista Street and Spiritual road at Campsite Area
2. Sampaguita Street going to Springfield area and part of San Vicente Street also at Campsite
3. Everlasting Street to Hasmin Street, Lower Hasmin Street going to gravel Pit Road, Payatas B
4. Molave street connecting at Litex Road, going to Lower Molave, Tahanan Rehabilitation, Atis Roads going to Spiritual and San Juan Bautista Street at Campsite
5. Madja-as Avenue going into inner Group 2 composing of Mayon, Banahaw Campo Verde Street etc.
6. Amlac Ville Subdivision private road, the main road going to Urban Lupang Pangako, including Phase 1, II, III and Phase IV, Payatas B

The provision of utility services such as electricity, water, public transport and communication relies on the improvement and repairs of access roads.

== Drainage and sewage ==
Payatas is drained principally by the Marikina River Basin, with the Marikina River as the main drainage out fall.

Developed areas such as residential subdivisions have their own drainage network or man-made canals or pipe grids discharging into rivers and creeks.

Toilet facilities and individual septic tanks are mostly found in developed housing areas. In Area A, Payatas residents mostly employ water-scaled types of toilet facilities. In Lupang Pangako, and some in Area B, Payatas, 80% of the residents use open dumping for waste.

There is no area-wide sewer system for Payatas. Wastewater coming from squatter colonies is usually directly discharged on the ground.

== Solid waste disposal ==
The Payatas Dumpsite is situated in the north, three kilometers from the Commonwealth via Litex Road. It occupies more than 13 hectares of entirely private properties. An estimated 2,000 cubic meters (924 tons) of garbage is dumped in Payatas daily . Municipalities dumping in the area are Quezon City and San Juan.

There are approximately 2,000 scavengers and 50 junk shop owners who profit from the dump site.

Residents dispose their waste through the Xerox waste management program of the Barangay Government (Garbage Collection).

=== Payatas dumpsite ===
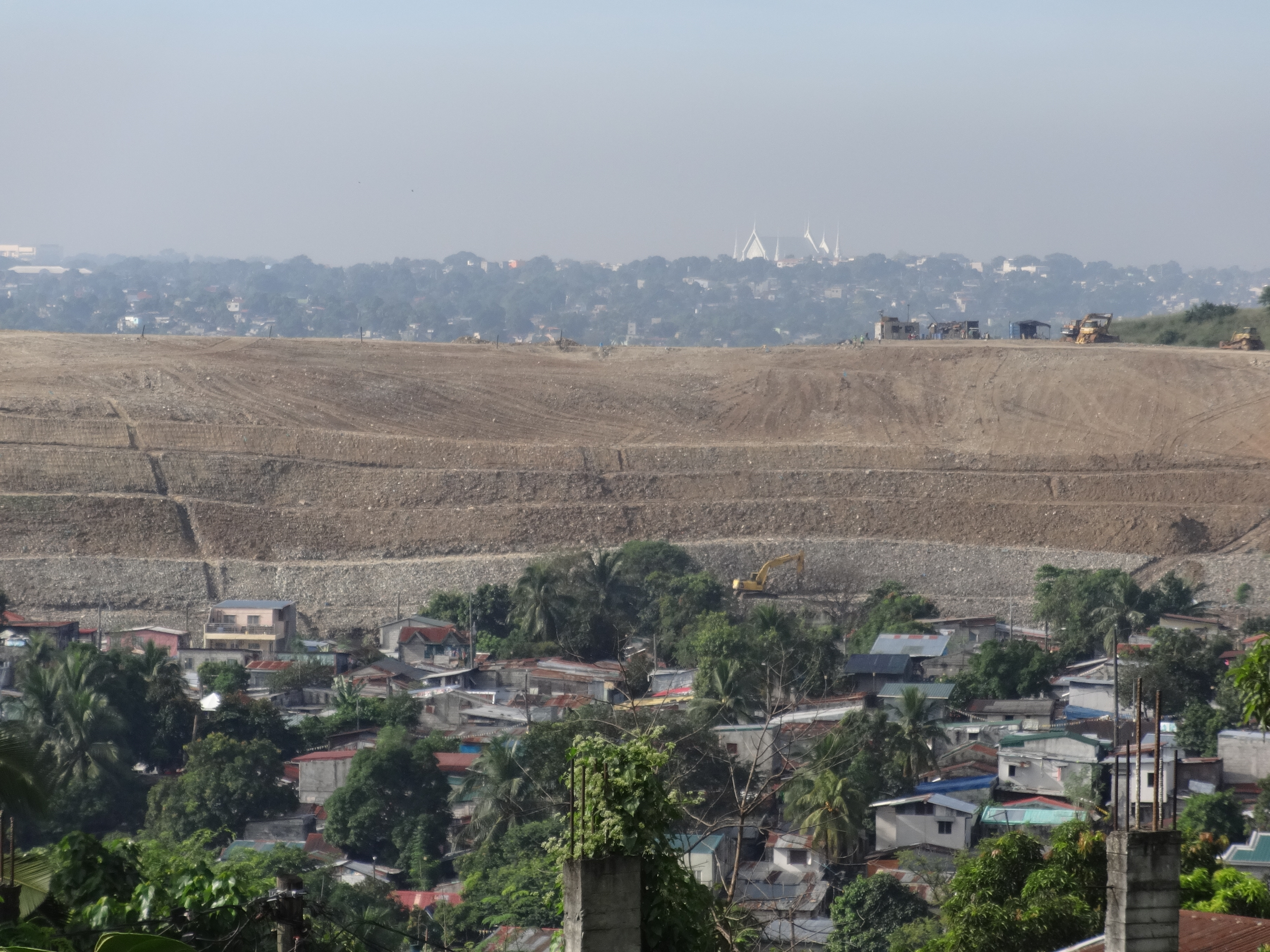
The Payatas dumpsite in 2017, at the time of its permanent closure.

Payatas is known for its former dumpsite, which closed in 2010. A landslide in the area led to the national legislation that banned open-ground dump sites in the Philippines. A more regulated dumping ground was established adjacent to the old landfill in 2011; the site closed in 2017.

In 2023 the dumpsite was converted into an urban park for cycling.

== Water supply ==
Approximately 95% of the area is served by MWSI or (Maynilad). This consists primarily of the residential areas near the IBP Road, Ilang-Ilang St., Payatas A. MWSI are laying the main line (pipes) for the area of Payatas and it is expected that the entire area will be serviced by MWSI by the end of 2000. The other 10% of residents are serviced by both public and private artesian wells, open-pit wells, spring creeks and water peddlers.

The City rations the water daily in the areas of Lupang Pangako (Phase I, II, III and IV), where most of urban poor (approximately 5,000 families) reside. This is done under SMILE Project “OPLAN Paglilingap sa Payatas”.

Other sources of drinking water include private artesian wells and water peddlers.

Manila Water owns the East La Mesa treatment plant in the Payatas. The plant provides water to the Rizal province.

== Sports ==
Payatas is a very poor area, and many foundations operate to help improve the opportunities of residents. This includes the Fairplay For All Foundation, which runs an alternative learning center, a sports center, and a cafe. Programs are run in part by locals. Several Payatas football players have represented the country in the National Youth Team and on Team Philippines in the Street Child World Cup. In total, the Payatas Football Club has won more than 40 trophies.

== Government ==
The seat of government of Payatas is located on Bulacan Street.

== Notable people ==
- Angelica Panganiban – actress

== See also ==
- Media related to Payatas at Wikimedia Commons
- The Woman in the Septic Tank, a film set at Tondo dumpsite
- Bangkang papel boys
- Bantar Gebang
