= Quezon City's 2nd congressional district =

Legislative district of the Philippines

- Constituency for the House of Representatives of the Philippines
- Interactive map of the district boundaries
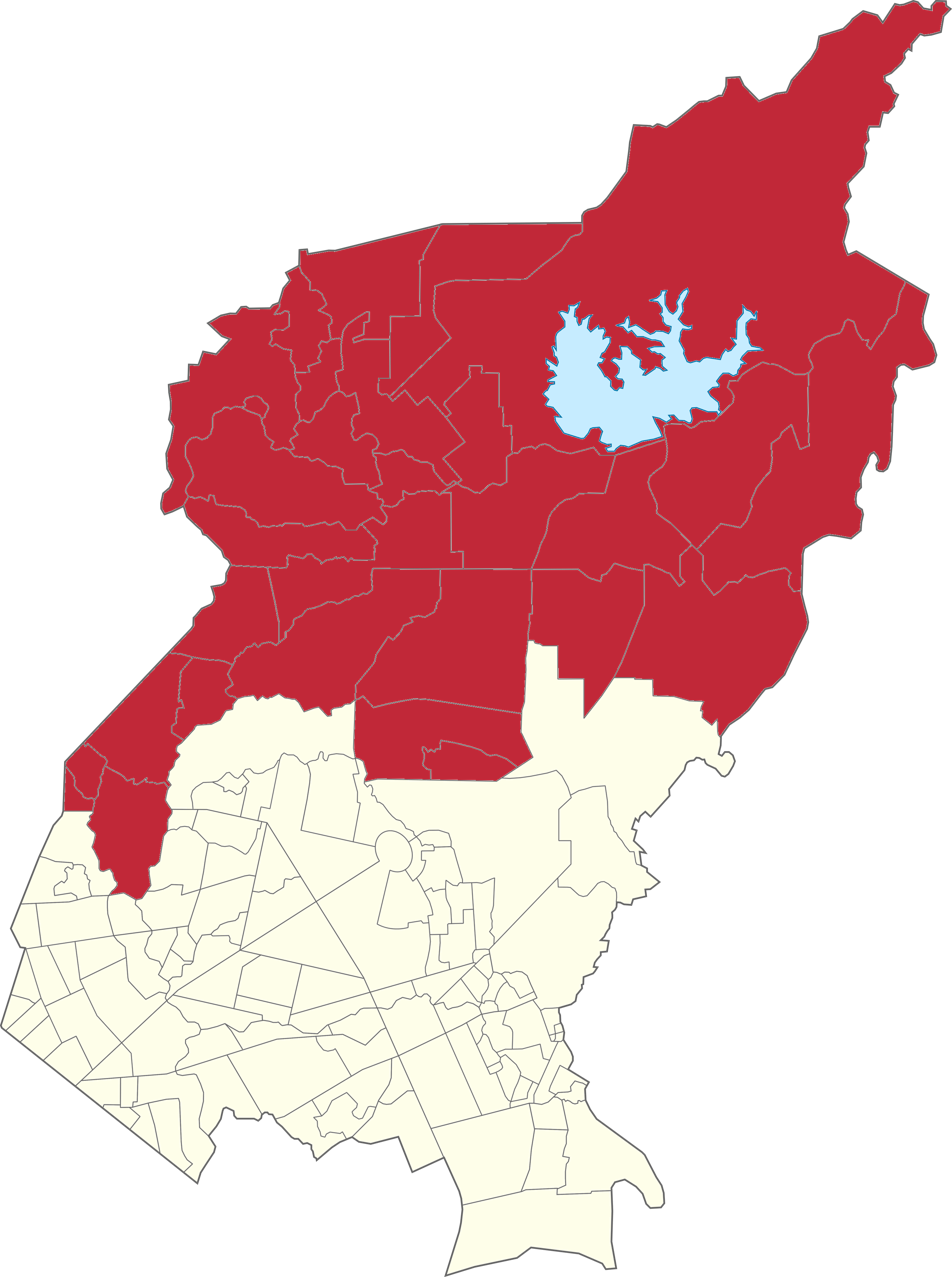
- Defunct boundary of Quezon City's 2nd congressional district (1987–2013)
- City: Quezon City
- Region: Metro Manila
- Population: 738,328 (2020)
- Electorate: 328,316 (2025)
- Major settlements: 5 barangays: Bagong Silangan, Batasan Hills, Commonwealth, Holy Spirit, Payatas
- Area: 19.59 km^{2} (7.56 sq mi)

Current constituency
- Created: 1987
- Representative: Ralph Tulfo
- Political party: PFP; SBP
- Congressional bloc: Majority

Quezon City's 2nd congressional district is one of the six congressional districts of the Philippines in Quezon City. It has been represented in the House of Representatives of the Philippines since 1987. The district consists of the eastern barangays bordering Marikina, San Mateo and Rodriguez. From 1987 to 2013, it was the most populous district in the country, encompassing the northern part of Quezon City commonly called as Novaliches, until it was redistricted in time for the 2013 election. Just like its pre-2013 composition, it still includes the Batasang Pambansa, the seat of the House of Representatives. It is currently represented in the 20th Congress by Ralph Wendel Tulfo of the Partido Federal ng Pilipinas (PFP) and Serbisyo sa Bayan Party (SBP).

== Representation history ==
#	Image	Member	Term of office		Congress	Party	Electoral history	Constituent LGUs
#	Image	Member	Start	End	Congress	Party	Electoral history	Constituent LGUs
=== Quezon City's 2nd district for the House of Representatives of the Philippines ===
District created February 2, 1987.
1		Antonio Aquino	June 30, 1987	June 30, 1992	8th	PDP–Laban	Elected in 1987.	1987–1998; Apolonio Samson, Baesa, Bagbag, Bagong Silangan, Balong Bato, Capri, Commonwealth, Batasan Hills, Culiat, Fairview, Gulod, Holy Spirit, Kaligayahan, Nagkaisang Nayon, New Era, Novaliches Proper, Pasong Putik, Pasong Tamo, Payatas, San Agustin, San Bartolome, Sangandaan, Santa Lucia, Santa Monica, Sauyo, Talipapa, Tandang Sora, Unang Sigaw
2		Dante Liban	June 30, 1992	June 30, 2001	9th	LDP	Elected in 1992.	1987–1998; Apolonio Samson, Baesa, Bagbag, Bagong Silangan, Balong Bato, Capri, Commonwealth, Batasan Hills, Culiat, Fairview, Gulod, Holy Spirit, Kaligayahan, Nagkaisang Nayon, New Era, Novaliches Proper, Pasong Putik, Pasong Tamo, Payatas, San Agustin, San Bartolome, Sangandaan, Santa Lucia, Santa Monica, Sauyo, Talipapa, Tandang Sora, Unang Sigaw
2		Dante Liban	June 30, 1992	June 30, 2001	10th	Lakas	Re-elected in 1995.	1987–1998; Apolonio Samson, Baesa, Bagbag, Bagong Silangan, Balong Bato, Capri, Commonwealth, Batasan Hills, Culiat, Fairview, Gulod, Holy Spirit, Kaligayahan, Nagkaisang Nayon, New Era, Novaliches Proper, Pasong Putik, Pasong Tamo, Payatas, San Agustin, San Bartolome, Sangandaan, Santa Lucia, Santa Monica, Sauyo, Talipapa, Tandang Sora, Unang Sigaw
2		Dante Liban	June 30, 1992	June 30, 2001	11th	Lakas	Re-elected in 1998.	1998–2013; Apolonio Samson, Baesa, Bagbag, Bagong Silangan, Balong Bato, Capri, Commonwealth, Batasan Hills, Culiat, Fairview, Greater Lagro, Gulod, Holy Spirit, Kaligayahan, Nagkaisang Nayon, New Era, North Fairview, Novaliches Proper, Pasong Putik Proper, Pasong Tamo, Payatas, San Agustin, San Bartolome, Sangandaan, Santa Lucia, Santa Monica, Sauyo, Talipapa, Tandang Sora, Unang Sigaw
3		Ismael Mathay III	June 30, 2001	June 30, 2004	12th	Independent	Elected in 2001.	1998–2013; Apolonio Samson, Baesa, Bagbag, Bagong Silangan, Balong Bato, Capri, Commonwealth, Batasan Hills, Culiat, Fairview, Greater Lagro, Gulod, Holy Spirit, Kaligayahan, Nagkaisang Nayon, New Era, North Fairview, Novaliches Proper, Pasong Putik Proper, Pasong Tamo, Payatas, San Agustin, San Bartolome, Sangandaan, Santa Lucia, Santa Monica, Sauyo, Talipapa, Tandang Sora, Unang Sigaw
4		Mary Ann Susano	June 30, 2004	June 30, 2010	13th	Lakas	Elected in 2004.	1998–2013; Apolonio Samson, Baesa, Bagbag, Bagong Silangan, Balong Bato, Capri, Commonwealth, Batasan Hills, Culiat, Fairview, Greater Lagro, Gulod, Holy Spirit, Kaligayahan, Nagkaisang Nayon, New Era, North Fairview, Novaliches Proper, Pasong Putik Proper, Pasong Tamo, Payatas, San Agustin, San Bartolome, Sangandaan, Santa Lucia, Santa Monica, Sauyo, Talipapa, Tandang Sora, Unang Sigaw
4		Mary Ann Susano	June 30, 2004	June 30, 2010	14th	PMP	Re-elected in 2007.	1998–2013; Apolonio Samson, Baesa, Bagbag, Bagong Silangan, Balong Bato, Capri, Commonwealth, Batasan Hills, Culiat, Fairview, Greater Lagro, Gulod, Holy Spirit, Kaligayahan, Nagkaisang Nayon, New Era, North Fairview, Novaliches Proper, Pasong Putik Proper, Pasong Tamo, Payatas, San Agustin, San Bartolome, Sangandaan, Santa Lucia, Santa Monica, Sauyo, Talipapa, Tandang Sora, Unang Sigaw
5		Winston Castelo	June 30, 2010	June 30, 2019	15th	Liberal	Elected in 2010.	1998–2013; Apolonio Samson, Baesa, Bagbag, Bagong Silangan, Balong Bato, Capri, Commonwealth, Batasan Hills, Culiat, Fairview, Greater Lagro, Gulod, Holy Spirit, Kaligayahan, Nagkaisang Nayon, New Era, North Fairview, Novaliches Proper, Pasong Putik Proper, Pasong Tamo, Payatas, San Agustin, San Bartolome, Sangandaan, Santa Lucia, Santa Monica, Sauyo, Talipapa, Tandang Sora, Unang Sigaw
5		Winston Castelo	June 30, 2010	June 30, 2019	16th	Liberal	Re-elected in 2013.	2013–present Bagong Silangan, Batasan Hills, Commonwealth, Holy Spirit, Payatas
5		Winston Castelo	June 30, 2010	June 30, 2019	17th	PDP-Laban	Re-elected in 2016.	2013–present Bagong Silangan, Batasan Hills, Commonwealth, Holy Spirit, Payatas
6		Precious Hipolito-Castelo	June 30, 2019	June 30, 2022	18th	NPC (SBP)	Elected in 2019.	2013–present Bagong Silangan, Batasan Hills, Commonwealth, Holy Spirit, Payatas
6		Precious Hipolito-Castelo	June 30, 2019	June 30, 2022	18th	Lakas	Elected in 2019.	2013–present Bagong Silangan, Batasan Hills, Commonwealth, Holy Spirit, Payatas
7		Ralph Tulfo	June 30, 2022	Incumbent	19th	Independent (SBP)	Elected in 2022.	2013–present Bagong Silangan, Batasan Hills, Commonwealth, Holy Spirit, Payatas
7		Ralph Tulfo	June 30, 2022	Incumbent	19th	Nacionalista (SBP)	Elected in 2022.	2013–present Bagong Silangan, Batasan Hills, Commonwealth, Holy Spirit, Payatas
7		Ralph Tulfo	June 30, 2022	Incumbent	19th	PFP (SBP)	Elected in 2022.	2013–present Bagong Silangan, Batasan Hills, Commonwealth, Holy Spirit, Payatas
7		Ralph Tulfo	June 30, 2022	Incumbent	20th	PFP (SBP)	Re-elected in 2025.	2013–present Bagong Silangan, Batasan Hills, Commonwealth, Holy Spirit, Payatas

== Election results ==
=== 2010 ===
Philippine House of Representatives election at Quezon City's 2nd district
Party	Candidate	Votes	%
Liberal	Winston Castelo	129,660	37.39
Independent	Christopher Belmonte	105,101	30.31
PMP	Allan Butch Francisco	38,582	11.13
Ang Kapatiran	Dante Liban	28,688	8.27
Independent	Chuck Mathay	26,383	7.61
Independent	Voltaire Godofredo Liban III	15,944	4.60
Buklod	Myrleon Peralta	876	0.25
PGRP	Walter Jimenez	591	0.17
Independent	Fernando Uy	367	0.11
KBL	Norma Nueva	326	0.09
Independent	Dionisio Rellosa, Jr.	253	0.07
Valid ballots		346,771	92.50
Invalid or blank votes		28,121	7.50
Total votes		374,892	100.00
Liberal gain from PMP			

=== 2013 ===
2013 Philippine House of Representatives election at Quezon City's 2nd district
Party	Candidate	Votes	%
Liberal	Winston Castelo	76,562	56.47
Independent	Ismael Mathay III	44,043	32.49
Margin of victory		32,519	23.99%
Valid ballots		120,605	88.96
Invalid or blank votes		14,969	11.04
Total votes		135,574	100.00
Liberal hold			

=== 2016 ===
2016 Philippine House of Representatives election at Quezon City's 2nd district
Party	Candidate	Votes	%
Liberal	Winston Castelo	172,001	
Invalid or blank votes		44,722	
Total votes		216,723	
Liberal hold			

=== 2019 ===
2019 Philippine House of Representatives election in the Quezon City's 2nd District
Party	Candidate	Votes	%
NPC	Precious Hipolito-Castelo	109,515	54.3
KDP	Mary Ann Susano	48,924	24.3
PFP	Dante Liban	23,089	11.4
PDP–Laban	Winsell Beltran-Cordora	15,108	7.5
Independent	Virgilio Garcia	5,032	2.5
Valid ballots		201,668	91.6
Invalid or blank votes		18,463	8.4
Total votes		220,131	100.0
NPC gain from PDP–Laban			

=== 2022 ===
2022 Philippine House of Representatives election at Quezon City's 2nd District
Party	Candidate	Votes	%
Independent	Ralph Wendel Tulfo	127,238	53.81
Lakas	Mari Grace "Precious" Hipolito-Castelo (incumbent)	96,565	40.84
Independent	Virgilio "Atty. Virgil" Garcia	6,231	2.63
Independent	Diosdado Calonge	3,533	1.49
Independent	Henric David	1,806	0.76
Independent	Raul Gador	1,103	0.47
Total votes		236,476	100.00
Independent gain from Lakas			

=== 2025 ===
2025 Philippine House of Representatives election at Quezon City's 2nd District
Party	Candidate	Votes	%
PFP	Ralph Wendel Tulfo	185,164	81.7
Independent	Virgilio "Atty. Virgil" Garcia	31,412	13.86
Independent	Francisco Palma	6,432	2.84
Independent	Roel Bernido	3,638	1.6
Total votes		226,646	100.00
PFP hold			

== See also ==
- Legislative districts of Quezon City
