= 2026 Binaliw landslide =

Garbage landslide in Cebu City, Philippines

- Date: January 8, 2026
- Venue: Binaliw landfill
- Location: Cebu City, Philippines
- Type: garbage landslide
- Cause: Slope of accumulated garbage
- Deaths: 36
- Injuries: 18

On January 8, 2026, a garbage landslide occurred at a sanitary landfill at Barangay Binaliw, Cebu City, Philippines. A large pile of garbage collapsed, leaving 36 people dead and 18 others injured. The incident involved mostly sanitation workers who were working in the site.

== Background ==
The Binaliw landfill is a 15 ha (37 acres), privately-owned, sanitary landfill located in Barangay Binaliw, in Cebu City. The facility serves not only Cebu City, but also the cities of Lapu-Lapu and Mandaue. It was originally operated by ARN Central Waste Management Inc. (ACI) since it began operations in 2019 until Prime Integrated Waste Solutions Inc. (PWS), a company owned by Enrique Razon, took over in 2023. The site had originally been designed to serve as a materials recovery facility tasked with sorting recyclables, but ultimately operated as a full-scale landfill.

Prior to the collapse, the Binaliw landfill had been the subject of complaints from nearby communities. The residents within the area aired concerns regarding persistent foul odors from the site in March 2023. The Cebu City Council called for an executive session again in August and September 2024, along with representatives of PWS, as well as city offices, environmental regulators, and affected residents. The city council members cited concern regarding odor, leachate, and possible water contamination.

== Landslide ==
The landslide occurred in fair weather conditions in the afternoon of January 8, 2026, at around 16:17 PHT (08:17 UTC). An avalanche of garbage and debris caused damages to several structures and facilities, including the site's Material Recovery Facility (MRF), located 25 m (82 ft) from the source of the landslide, and several houses. A resident living near the landfill said workers tried to warn colleagues of the landslide but were not heard due to noises from machinery. The landslide reached a distance of 200 m (660 ft) and a height of between 15 and 20 storeys.

There were 110 workers at the site when the incident happened. Thirty-six people were killed in the landslide, while 18 others were injured. Recovery efforts finished on January 18. Sixteen of the victims were residents of Cebu City, while the rest were from Lapu-Lapu City, Consolacion and Balamban. On January 20, the Cebu City government said a volunteer rescue worker from Toledo, Cebu, died from septic shock after sustaining blisters that became infected while working at the landfill.

== Emergency response ==
Approximately 300 personnel from various government agencies and civic groups were deployed to the site. Heavy equipment, including excavators, ambulances, and fire trucks, were mobilized to assist in search and rescue efforts. A group of miners from Davao Region also volunteered at the site. Rescue operations were hampered by the presence of large beams and steel debris at the site of the MRF, the presence of health hazards such as foul odor and methane gas at the landfill and heavy rains. On January 11, fire officials said that it was unlikely for people to still be alive three days after "tons of debris and trash had collapsed over them". The Office of Civil Defense also noted that the number of those trapped in the landfill could be higher.

== Aftermath ==
Following the collapse, waste dumping operations were halted by the government in the Binaliw landfill. The Cebu City government requested assistance from Department of Environment and Natural Resources (DENR) – Region 7 on temporary dumping arrangements. Mayor Nestor Archival of Cebu City proposed landfills from Consolacion and Minglanilla as temporary receiving facilities. Mandaue mayor Thadeo Jovito Ouano suspended garbage collection in the city on January 9. The Cebu City government later reached a 30-day agreement to dispose of its waste in Consolacion.

On January 13, a state of calamity was declared in Cebu City due to the disaster, with the city government pledging ₱30 million (US$609,137.06) to resolve waste management issues and fund search and rescue operations. A day of mourning was declared by the Cebu City Council and the Archdiocese of Cebu for January 16 in memory of the victims.

== Investigation ==
A report by the Mines and Geosciences Bureau cited oversaturation of landfill waste due to continuous rainfall over the previous weeks as a possible cause for the landslide. It also noted other factors such as possible lapses in geotechnical and engineering works such as the stability of waste stockpiles, slope conditions, and landfill benching at 6 m (20 ft) intervals with the landfill waster reaching a height of 35 m (115 ft) on a steep slope. A legislative inquiry into the disaster was filed in the Philippine Senate by senator Imee Marcos. Cebu City councilor Joel Garganera also said that the height of the piled garbage in Binaliw exceeded safety limits, comparing it to a previously used dumpsite in Barangay Inayawan that had a height of five storeys. Both PWS and Cebu City mayor Nestor Archival also attributed recent natural disasters such as the 2025 Cebu earthquake and Typhoon Kalmaegi as having triggered the landslide.

== See also ==
- Payatas landslide – A similar incident in 2000 at a dumpsite in Quezon City
