= 2005 Leuwigajah landslide =

Natural disaster

The 2005 Leuwigajah landslide was a landslide that killed 143 people in Indonesia. The Leuwigajah landfill serving the cities of Cimahi and Bandung in West Java, Indonesia experienced a catastrophic garbage landslide on 21 February 2005 when the face of a large, almost-vertical garbage mound collapsed after days of rain. The slide tore through informal neighborhoods set up by individuals within the landfill for the purpose of collecting recyclables, where it killed 143 people and injured many more.

== Leuwigajah landfill ==
Prior to the landslide the dumpsite had been the primary disposal zone for trash from Bandung and Cimahi. Bandung sent over 3400 cubic meters of trash to the site per day, while Cimahi added 400 cubic meters and the residential District of Bandung adjacent to the dump added 750 cubic meters per day. Garbage had piled up in the dumpsite with a peak height of 70 meters.

== Landslide ==
Two days of heavy rain had preceded the landslide, which would have loosened mounds of garbage already destabilized by human interaction. On 21 February a large mound gave way and traveled south-southwest for over one kilometer. Sudden releases of methane gas from the slide caused explosions. The slide moved parallel the communities of Cireundeu, which sat just southeast to the slide's point of origin, and Gunung Lentik.

== Aftermath ==
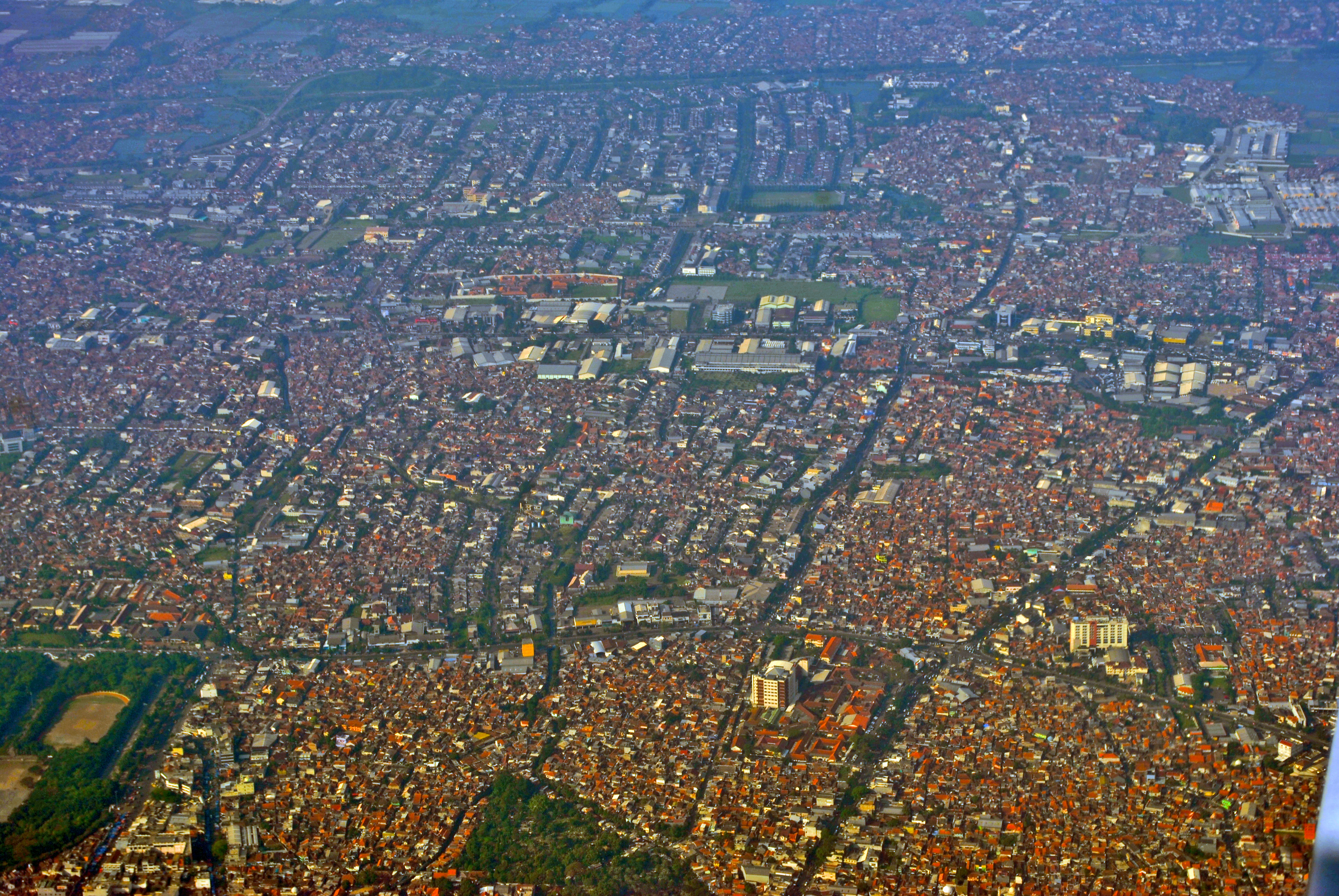
The Leuwigajah Disposal Site provided landfill service for the cities of Cimahi and Bandung.

The disaster brought heightened regional awareness to the danger of irresponsible waste management techniques. The City of Cimahi and the City and District of Bandung canceled their agreements to send their trash to the landfill service. In December 2014 a fatwa titled Waste Management to Counteract Environment Degradation was issued by the Indonesian Ulema Council that cited the Leuwigajah disaster victims from Cimahi as a primary motivation for action to prevent a similar disaster in the future.
