= Fairplay For All Foundation =

Philippines non-government organization

- Founded: Quezon City, Philippines, 2011
- Type: Non-profit, Interest group
- Location: Payatas, Quezon City, Philippines
- Services: Education sponsorships, football team, drop-in center, microfinance, urban farming, alternative education
- Fields: Children's rights, Education, Poverty reduction, Sports
- Website: www.fairplayforall.org

The Fairplay For All Foundation (FFA) is a non-stock, non-profit, non-government organization working in the community of Payatas in the Philippines. Payatas is known as the home of the country's largest open dump site. Residents are very poor and overall the area scores 0.4179 on the Human Development Index, similar to the scores of the poorest countries in the world, while the Philippines overall scores 0.74 (Regalario, 2002).

Fairplay's main objective is to help develop the community to sustainably and holistically break the cycle of poverty. Its programs include a grassroots football team, Payatas Football Club, a registered Alternative Learning Center (the Fairplay School), and the Fairplay Cafe which serves healthy and delicious food in the community and outside of Payatas to offices, businesses, and sports clinics. With its name reminiscent of Fair Play campaigns in football culture, Fairplay's vision is to achieve a “level playing field on and off the pitch”—that is, creating an environment where students and residents can develop, learn, and grow to break their own cycle of poverty.

== History ==
With the rising popularity of the Azkals, the Philippine National Men's Football Team, football gained popularity in the Philippines. Roy Moore, a British national and graduate student, had previously done volunteer work in the country and saw this as an opportunity to form a team in Payatas as many of the kids were interested in learning to play. During this time Moore was introduced to Naomi Tomlinson, who had previously done volunteer work in Mindanao and also founded Triple E, a fund raising charity based in England that aimed to help street children in the Philippines. This led to a partnership between Moore and Tomlinson and the founding of the Fairplay For All Foundation.

In 2012, the Fairplay For All Foundation was selected to be the Philippine partner charity of the Street Child World Cup, to be held in Rio, Brazil, in 2014.

== Projects ==
=== Football: Payatas FC ===
In 2011, British national Roy Moore started a football training program in a barangay basketball court in Payatas. Moore saw the rising popularity of the Azkals, the Philippine national football team, as an opportunity to reach out to the community while also developing grassroots football. More than 100 people joined the first session. With trainings every week, a growing relationship between the kids, the community, and Fairplay grew.

Payatas FC's vision for the children of Payatas goes beyond sports; it is their way to break the cycle of poverty as well. Moore said in an interview for an online international publication, "Often in situations of poverty people lose the ability to dream. Over time, being in the same place, they get used to the same routine; they get used to the same system. Being able to go outside of Payatas enables the kids to see the different ways that people live in the Philippines. It enables them to see different situations and realise that there are ways to break that poverty cycle."

Players of Payatas FC have been invited to participate in training clinics by the Azkals, the Philippine National Men's Football Team, Global FC of the United Football League, as well as LA Galaxy with international football superstar David Beckham. Some members of the Azkals such as Lexton Moy, Juani Guirado, Rob Gier and Nate Burkey have visited Payatas to join the children during training. Lexton Moy was one of the earliest supporters of Payatas FC, who recently ran a marathon to raise funds for the team to get their own jeepney, a form of local transport which would take the kids to and from tournaments and training events. Juani Guirado shot a promotional video for the Azkals with one of the players of Payatas FC.

Through word of mouth, Payatas FC has captured the attention of local and international media, who have produced documentaries and features on Payatas FC. This includes international sports magazine show FIFA Futbol Mundial, GMA News TV's Brigada hosted by award-winning journalist Jessica Soho, among others. One of the U8 players also filmed a promotional video with Juani Guirado of the Azkals. Payatas FC and the FFA were also featured on international and local print and online media outlets such as Yahoo! Sports, GMA News Online, InterakTV, The Manila Bulletin, and The Guardian’s International Development Journalism Competition 2013.

News of the football team spread and selected footballers were also given a chance for an educational sponsorship through donors from the Philippines, the UK, and around the world. Since Moore's first training session with the kids of Payatas, Payatas FC now has a regular pool of boys and girls of various age groups. Several players have joined the National Youth team The team has won over 30 trophies.

=== The Fairplay School ===
The Fairplay School is the first school in the Philippines to be run on the principles of Democratic Education. Children from the community who have dropped out of school, for whatever reason, are able to go to the school and learn at their own pace. Attendance is non-compulsory and students are able to drive their own education and choose what they learn. Every week there is a meeting of the full-time students, registered kids with the school, who debate and vote on the rules of the School itself.

The Fairplay School focuses primarily on development in Emotional Intelligence and the Growth Mindset as popularised by Carol Dweck. Academically the School is registered as an Alternative Learning Center and so students, when they feel ready, can take the exams to get Elementary and High School Diplomas.

=== Street Child World Cup ===
Fairplay is also the official organizing body of Team Philippines for the Street Child World Cup. Fairplay promotes scouting tournaments ahead of the Street Child World Cup and forms a team from NGOs across the country so as to represent the whole of the Philippines and not only Payatas. In 2014, the girls team reached the final of the competition, losing 1-0 to hosts Brazil after sweeping their previous games. The boys were knocked out on penalties in the Quarter Finals against Pakistan. The Philippines were the only country involved whose National sport is not football.

== Media Links ==
- "," The charity's own website with full explanations of the projects and links to press and publicity.
- "Jumper Boy," an entry to The Guardian's International Development Journalism Competition 2013.
- "Sipa ng Pag-Asa," a segment on Brigada, a news documentary show on GMA News TV.
- FIFA Futbol Mundial
- FTW: Updates on the Fairplay For All Foundation, from GMA News Online
- FTW: Grassroots Development for Philippine Football, from GMA News Online
- "Roy Moore: Payatas FC" on TEDxDiliman
