= Street Child World Cup =

- Organiser(s): Street Child United
- Founded: March 2010
- Region: Global
- Teams: 28
- Related competitions: FIFA World Cup
- Current champions: Brazil, Egypt
- Motto: "I Am Somebody"
- Website: https://www.onemillionand.one/

The Street Child World Cup is a football tournament ahead of the FIFA World Cup. Each event is hosted by the country of the same upcoming FIFA World Cup. Previous hosts include South Africa, Brazil, Russia and Qatar.

== History ==
=== South Africa 2010 ===
The first Street Child World Cup was held in Durban, South Africa, in March 2010 The event brought together teams of street children and former street children from Brazil, South Africa, Nicaragua, Ukraine, India, the Philippines and Tanzania. The participants were between 14 and 16 years old at the time of the event and all had experience of living full-time on the streets without family. Each squad of 9 players included 3 girls. A representative team of young people from Manchester, UK, also took part in the tournament. This team was mentored by UK children's TV presenter Andy Akinwolere, and his journey was covered on the BBC Children's TV show, Blue Peter.

The Street Child World Cup was initiated by UK human rights charity the Amos Trust. It was hosted in Durban by Umthombo Street Children and the Durban University of Technology.

Each team was brought by a street child organization based in the contributing country:

- Action for Brazil's Children;
- Casa Alianza Nicaragua;
- Depaul Kharkiv (Ukraine);
- Youth Football Club Rurka Kalan and the Khalsa Football Academy (India);
- Caretakers of the Environment Tanzania, through Tanzania Street Children Sports Academy (TSC Sports Academy);
- A network of charities worked together to bring a team from the Philippines
- The UK team was brought by the M13 Youth Project.

Between 12 and 22 March 2010, the participating children competed in a 7-a-side football tournament and created artworks which were subsequently exhibited in the Durban Art Gallery and at the Foundling Museum, London, and took part in a youth participation conference. The outcomes of the conference were published in November 2010 as 'The Durban Declaration'. This emphasizes street children's right to be heard, right to a home, right to protection from violence, and right to access health and education. Girls participating in the Street Child World Cup produced a Street Girl's Manifesto which was published as part of Plan International's 2010 ‘Because I am a Girl’ report on the state of the world's girls.

The artwork created at the event was facilitated by Momentum Arts, a Cambridge-based arts inclusion charity. Specialized coaching was provided by Coaching for Hope.

The main overall sponsors of the event were Deloitte, and the event was known as the Deloitte Street Child World Cup.

The football tournament was won by India, who beat Tanzania in the finals. The Shield was won by the Philippines team. Ukraine won the Fair Play award.

The Philippine team will be managed by the Fairplay For All Foundation.

=== Brazil 2014 ===
Rio de Janeiro, Brazil played host to the second Street Child World Cup,

Ahead of the 2014 FIFA World Cup in Brazil, the Street Child World Cup in association with Save the Children, united 230 street-connected children representing 19 countries to play in their own international football tournament, festival of arts, and Congress for their rights.

For the first time, a girls' tournament ran alongside the boys'. Nine girls' teams were played. Brazil were crowned champions after a close-fought match versus the Philippines 1–0.

The boys representing 15 national teams played in Brazil. Tanzania reached the final versus their neighbours in Burundi. Tanzania 3–1 Burundi.

=== Russia 2018 ===
The third Street Child World Cup took place in Moscow from 10 to 18 May 2018, bringing more than 200 young people from 19 countries together to campaign for the rights and protection of street-connected children.

Girls teams: Bolivia, Brazil, Egypt, England, India, Kazakhstan, Mauritius, Mexico, Philippines, Russia, Tanzania, USA

Boys teams: Belarus, Brazil, Burundi, Egypt, Indonesia, Kenya, Nepal, Pakistan, Russia, Tajikistan, Uzbekistan

Brazil Girls and Uzbekistan Boys won the football tournaments.

The global football community supported the event, including FIFA World Cup winner and Arsenal invincible Gilberto Silva, Khalida Popal, Ryan Giggs, Gary Lineker and Alan Shearer.

=== Qatar 2022 ===
Oxygen Park, Education City, Doha hosted the fourth Street Child World Cup 2022.

The ten-day event brought street-connected young people from across the world together to take part in a football tournament, a festival of arts, and advocate for their rights and protection through a child-focused Congress and General Assembly. The General Assembly was attended by HE Sheikha Hind bint Hamad Al Thani, who signed the Qatar Commitment alongside Street Child United CEO John Wroe. Street Child United launched their "One Million and One" campaign at the event, pledging to help one million and one disadvantaged young people receive legal identification. The event was attended by both HH Sheikha Moza bint Nasser and HE Sheikha Hind bint Hamad Al Thani.

The Street Child World Cup 2022 girls tournament was won by Brazil after defeating Colombia. The boys tournament was won by Egypt following a tense penalty shootout against Pakistan.

== Participating nations ==
Below is a list of some participating nations in recent editions.

- Argentina
- Australia
- Bangladesh
- Brazil
- Burundi
- Egypt
- Great Britain
- El Salvador
- Indonesia
- India
- Kenya
- Liberia
- Mauritius
- Mozambique
- Nicaragua
- Pakistan
- Philippines
- South Africa
- Tanzania
- United States

== Results ==
Until the 2014 edition, teams were composed of both boys and girls. Starting on the 2014 Street Child World Cup edition, there was a separate tournament for boys and girls. As of the 2022 edition, there are 15 boys teams and 13 girls teams.

=== Boys ===
Year	Host	Winners	Score	Runners-up	Joint Third/Fourth place (knocked out by winners)	Score	Joint Third/Fourth place (knocked out by runners-up)	Number of teams
2022	Qatar	Egypt	0-0(4-3p)	Pakistan	Burundi	n/a	Brazil	15

=== Girls ===
Year	Host	Winners	Score	Runners-up	Joint Third/Fourth place (knocked out by winners)	Score	Joint Third/Fourth place (knocked out by runners-up)	Number of teams
2022	Qatar	Brazil	4–0	Colombia	Philippines	n/a	Bolivia	13

== Documentary ==
In October 2023, the documentary I am Somebody, directed by Jamillah van der Hulst, was screened at the Cambridge Film Festival. The director said her motive was to "bring attention to the plight of street children".
