= Garbage landslide =

Collapse of pile of garbage similar to natural landslide

A garbage landslide is a man-made event that occurs when poorly managed garbage mounds at landfills collapse with similar energy to natural landslides. These kinds of slides can be catastrophic as they sometimes occur near communities of people, often being triggered by weather or human interaction. This form of landslide has attracted the attention of anthropologists, news media, and politicians as a result of incidents that have severely damaged communities and killed hundreds of people since the 1990s.

== Causes ==
People and weather can cause garbage landslides by impacting the weight distribution of mounds in landfills, which are sometimes poorly regulated and open to those seeking recyclables for profit. Human interaction can destabilize precarious mounds of garbage as people walk atop them or attempt to remove valuable materials. Such dangerous mounds are frequently found on slopes and hillsides, where landfills often exist due to the lack of value for other development. Impoverished communities may be drawn to build homes near such landfills for extant recycling opportunities, and informal neighborhoods have developed in high-risk areas as a result. People collecting garbage are thus commonly both triggers and victims of garbage landslides, but these events can also be caused by landfill workers driving heavy machinery nearby or adding too much trash to the mounds.

Weather is a common agitator and cause of garbage landslides. Mounds may collapse if they become heavier from rain and disturbances like strong storms can both trigger sliding and start fires if lightning ignites combustible gases from the landfill. Weather may also induce soil erosion, making landfills more vulnerable to sliding events.

=== Government mismanagement ===
Landfill mismanagement and public corruption have featured as significant factors to devastating garbage landslides. If layers of garbage are not properly buried, they remain loose and can gradually separate from the effects of weather and people. Poor waste management policies of different governments at local and national levels contribute to a lack of regulation enabling irresponsible dumping and hazardous access to landfills. Poverty in a society is a very important risk factor as the lack of more stable income can motivate people to collect recyclables from or live in such hazardous sites. As of 2017, around 15 million people lived and worked within such landfills.

== Notable examples ==
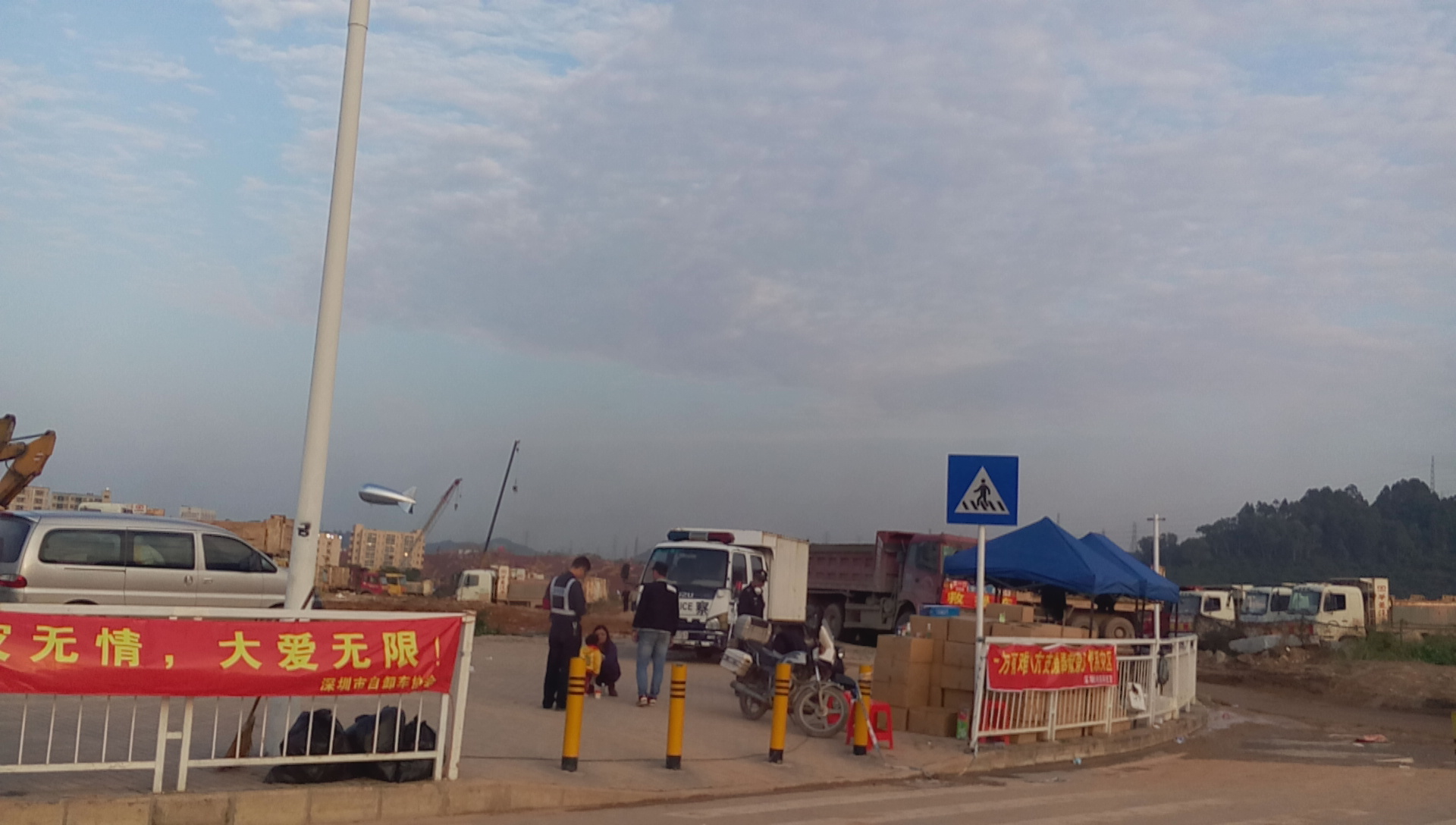
Cranes were used to remove debris after the 2015 Shenzhen landslide.

Several garbage landslides have occurred worldwide since the 1990s in which nearby infrastructure was destroyed or mass casualties occurred. Examples from the 90s include a 1993 methane explosion at a landfill in Istanbul's Ümraniye district, which triggered a landslide that killed 30 people, and a 1996 garbage slide in Ohio at the Colerain Township landfill which destroyed an adjacent limestone quarry. The latter landslide resulted in a 35-acre fire after lightning ignited combustible waste fumes.

These accidents have become more common and more deadly in the twenty-first century. On 21 July 2000 a garbage mound at the Payatas Sanitary Landfill collapsed and slid through the barangay of Payatas outside Quezon City, Philippines, which resulted in the deaths of over 300 people. The tragedy resulted in the Philippine Congress banning all open-air garbage dumps throughout the country. Urban settings can also be affected by these events: During the 2015 Shenzhen landslide a 100-meter tall garbage mound collapsed into a slide and destroyed 33 buildings, some of them multistoried concrete structures, in the Hengtaiyu Industrial Park of Shenzhen in addition to rupturing part of the West–East Gas Pipeline. 45 individuals ultimately faced charges for the disaster and 20 public officials who oversaw the creation and management of the Shenzhen landfill later received prison sentences for corruption.

Incidents such as the aforementioned slides attracted local and international outcry, but many smaller events occasionally strike communities with fatal results and attract little media attention. As populations rise, the volumes of waste that need to be managed grow with them and raise the risk of deadly accidents occurring. The development of communities around poorly managed landfills has left some populations increasingly vulnerable to garbage landslides, which accounted for 15% of landslides not involving soil or rocks from 1993-2004.

== See also ==
- 2005 Leuwigajah landslide
