= Bantar Gebang =

Village in Bekasi, Indonesia

Coordinates: 6.3116121°S 106.9860384°E

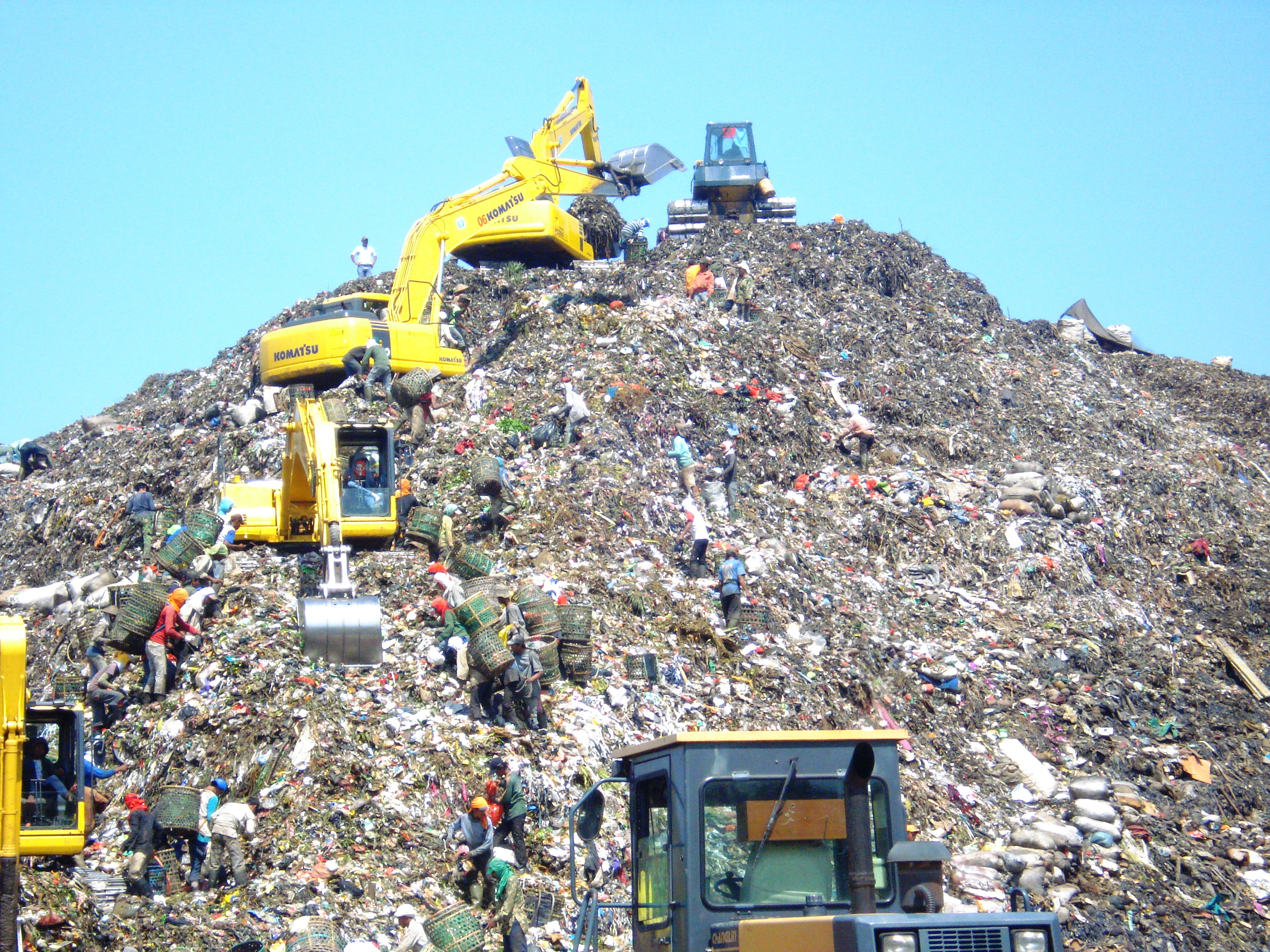
Landfill in Bantar Gebang

Bantar Gebang is administratively a kelurahan or village in Bekasi city, Indonesia, but it usually refers to the massive trash dump in the area, which measures 100 hectares (250 acres). Between 6,000 and 20,000 people are estimated to live and work on the site, collecting recyclables for resale. The site receives approximately 8,000 tons of trash each day from the nation's capital, Jakarta, located about 40 kilometres (25 mi) away.

On 8 March 2026, heavy rainfall induced an avalanche of garbage that killed seven people.

The Indonesian government has stated that it plans to shut down the open landfill, which is significantly over capacity, by the end of 2027, and build a waste-to-energy plant on the site.

== See also ==
- Payatas dumpsite, similar urban dump in Greater Manila, Philippines
