= Kotikawatta =

Kotikawatta කොටිකාවත්ත கொடிகாவத்த
- Town
- Location in Colombo District
- Coordinates: 6°56′28″N 79°55′10″E
- Country: Sri Lanka
- Province: Western Province
- District: Colombo

Population (2010)
  - Total: 72,858
- 2010 Department of Census and Statistics estimate
- Time zone: UTC+5:30 (Sri Lanka Standard Time Zone)
- Postal Code: 10620

Kotikawatta is a suburb of Colombo, Sri Lanka, situated east of the Colombo central business district. It is a fast developing administrative, commercial, and residential area in Colombo District.

== See also ==
- List of towns in Western Province, Sri Lanka
- Mulleriyawa
