= Payatas dumpsite =

Former open dumpsite in Quezon City, Philippines

Coordinates: 14°43′0.6″N 121°6′19.8″E

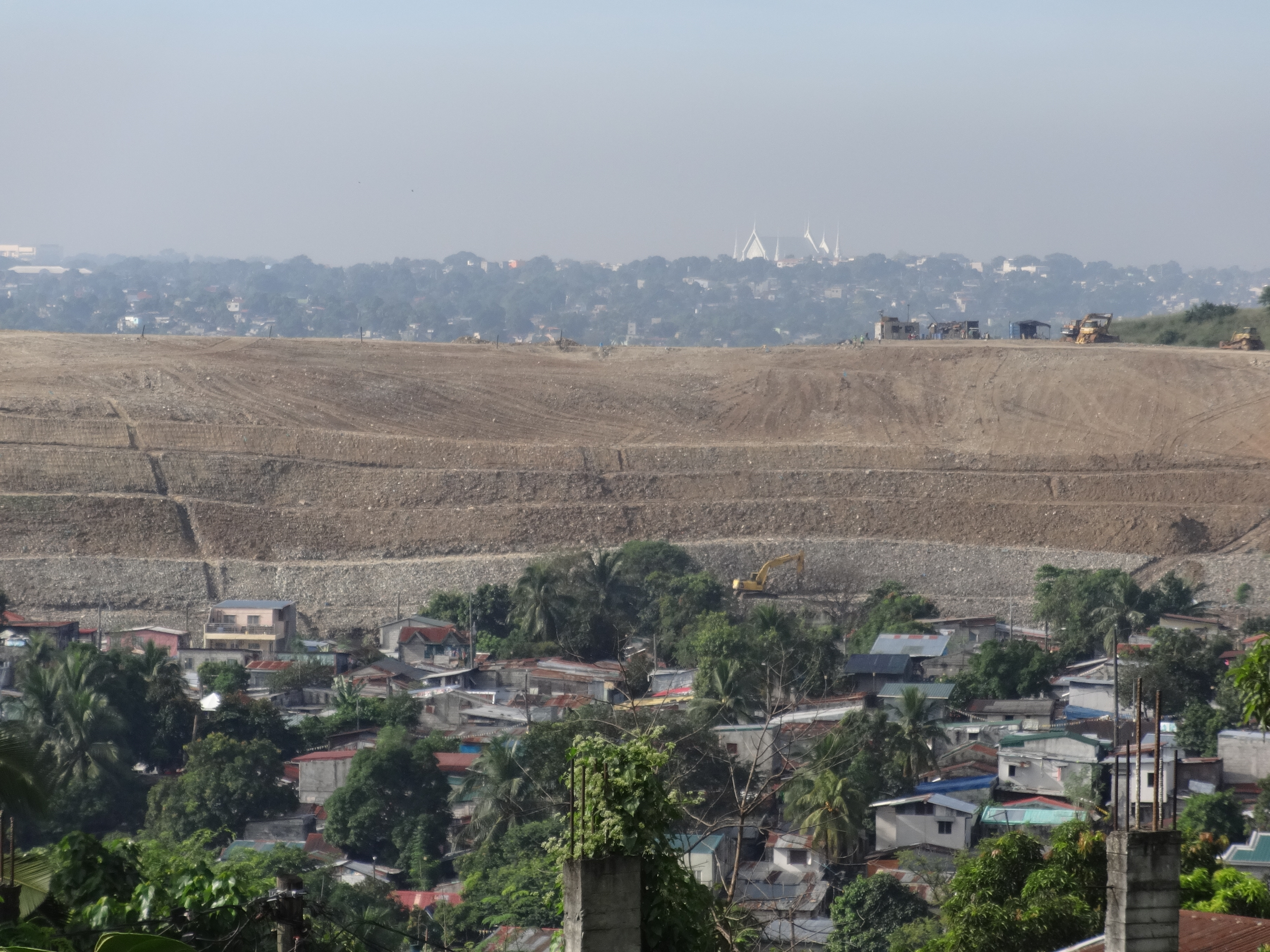
The Payatas dumpsite in 2017, at the time of its permanent closure

The Payatas dumpsite, also known as the Payatas Controlled Disposal Facility (PCDF), is a former garbage dump in the barangay of the same name in Quezon City, Metro Manila, the Philippines.

Originally established in the 1970s, the former open dumpsite was home to scavengers who migrated to the area after the closure of the Smokey Mountain landfill in Tondo, Manila. After the Payatas landslide happened in 2000, the newly passed Ecological Solid Waste Management Act mandated the closure of open and controlled dumpsites. The dumpsite was reorganized into a controlled disposal facility in 2004 and was permanently closed in 2017.

The former dumpsite is currently being redeveloped into an urban park for cycling activities.

== History ==
The dumpsite was established in the 1970s, as an open dumpsite in Lupang Pangako in Payatas, Quezon City. Prior to this, the area used to be a ravine surrounded by farming villages and rice paddies.

People residing in the Smokey Mountain landfill in Tondo, Manila who worked as scavengers migrated to the Payatas dumpsite after the former's closure in 1995. Payatas then developed a reputation as the "second Smokey Mountain", "21st century Smokey Mountain", "Smokey Mountain Two", "New Smokey Mountain", "Smokey Valley", or the "modern-day Smokey Mountain". The dumpsite became a common venue for street gang wars, especially among the Payatas Crips and the Tondo Bloods. On July 10, 2000, the Payatas landslide caused the deaths of 232 people residing within the landfill, which prompted the passage of Republic Act No. 9003 or the Ecological Solid Waste Management Act of 2000, which mandated the closure of open dumpsites by 2001 and controlled dumpsites by 2006. The dumping ground was immediately closed following the incident by then-President Joseph Estrada, but was reopened weeks later by then-Quezon City Mayor Mel Mathay to avert an epidemic in the city due to uncollected garbage caused by the closure.

In 2000, a geologist from the University of the Philippines raised that there might be a possible leakage of leachate from the dumpsite to the La Mesa Dam and Reservoir. The dumpsite is located less than 500 m (1,600 ft) from the reservoir itself.

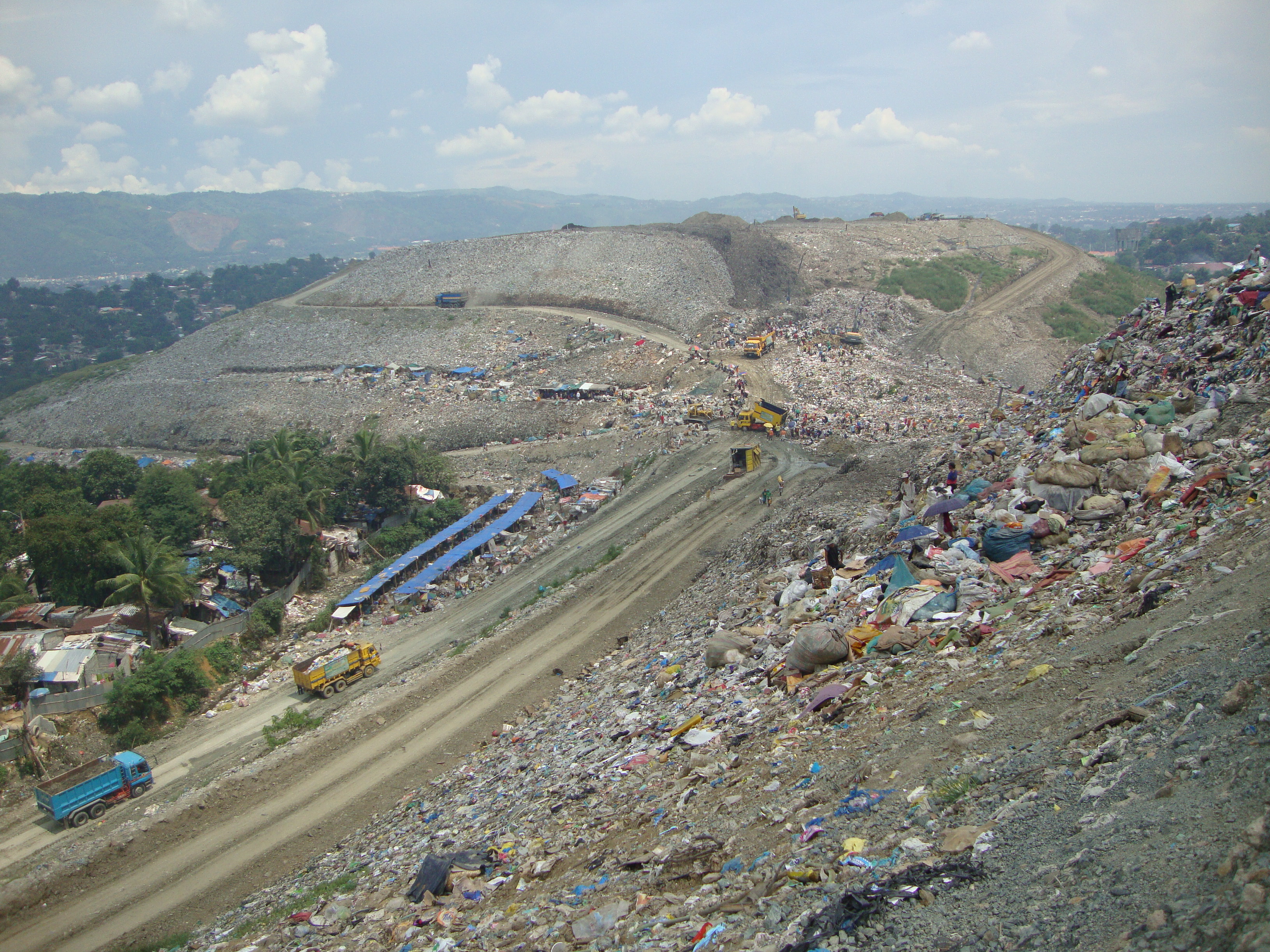
The Payatas controlled disposal facility in 2010

In 2004, the landfill was reorganized as a controlled disposal facility and was closed in December 2010.

A separate landfill with a stricter waste management policy was established nearby the old open dumpsite in January 2011. Garbage in the dumpsite was dumped on a layer of tarpaulin to prevent seepage of leachate to the groundwater. This dumpsite was permanently closed in December 2017 following an order issued by the DENR Environmental Management Bureau (DENR-EMB) on August 2, 2017, so that it could review the environmental compliance certificate (ECC) of IPM Environmental Services, the operator of the dumpsite.

In January 2020, the Quezon City Regional Trial Court ordered the government of Quezon City to pay more than 6 million pesos to the relatives of the 2000 Payatas landslide victims.

In March 2023, the former dumpsite was redeveloped into an urban park for cycling activities.

== See also ==
- Smokey Mountain
- Payatas landslide
