= Bangkang papel boys =

Filipino boys who received national recognition during the Arroyo Administration

Erwin Dolera, Jomer Pabalan, and Jayson Vann Banogan, known collectively as the "Bangkang papel" boys (Paper boat boys), were three boys who came to national notice in 2001 when they wrote their plight and aspirations on paper that they folded into boats and sent down the Pasig River towards then-President of the Philippines Gloria Macapagal Arroyo at the Malacañang Palace. The three were survivors of the Payatas garbage slide tragedy of July 2000. Although the paper boats never reached the palace, the activity, organized by an urban poor group, caught the attention of Arroyo.

The story of the boys moved the newly installed president, who presented them during her first State of the Nation Address (SONA). She invited the boys to the presidential palace and provided them with scholarships, jobs, and other support. In 2010, the outgoing president promised that the national social welfare and development services will continue to provide educational assistance to the boys.

The Aquino administration assured continued aid for the boys, although Arroyo had promised scholarships only until 2010. Two of the boys continued their studies. Dolera studied mass communication and Pabalan studied information technology.

On July 7, 2016, Dolera, who was a production assistant for News5, died of pneumonia and complications due to tuberculosis at the age of 24.
