= Payatas landslide =

2000 landfill collapse in Quezon City, Philippines

- Date: July 10, 2000
- Venue: Payatas dumpsite
- Location: Quezon City, Metro Manila, Philippines
- Type: Landslide
- Cause: Slope of accumulated garbage
- Outcome: Ban of open ground dumpsites in the Philippines; closure of the Payatas dumpsite in 2010
- Deaths: 218

The Payatas landslide was a garbage dump collapse at Payatas, Quezon City, Philippines, on July 10, 2000. A large pile of garbage first collapsed and then went up in flames which resulted in the destruction of about 100 houses.

== Background ==
The residents near the Payatas dumpsite, specifically Lupang Pangako, were moved to the area from other parts of Quezon City in the 1990s under then-mayor Brigido Simon. Parts of Lupang Pangako then would be used for the dump, a "mountain of garbage" eventually piled up near the relocation site.

Poor people often scavenge the Payatas dumpsite as a means of livelihood. Some of the garbage dumped on the site often combusts spontaneously.

== Landslide ==
The landslide killed 218 people and left 300 missing, according to official reports. Other sources, however, suggest that 705 people were killed, and many first-hand accounts note the number is far greater than the official figure, perhaps closer to 1,000.

The dumping ground was immediately closed following the incident by then President Joseph Estrada.

== Aftermath ==
The dumpsite was reopened weeks later by then-Quezon City Mayor Mel Mathay to avert an epidemic in the city due to uncollected garbage caused by the closure.

The landslide prompted the passage of Republic Act No. 9003 or the Ecological Solid Waste Management Act of 2000, which mandates the closure of open dumpsites in the Philippines by 2004 and controlled dumpsites by 2006.

In 2004, the Payatas dumpsite was reconfigured as a controlled disposal facility but was closed in December 2010. A separate dumpsite was established near the old open dumpsite in January 2011. The newer dumpsite closed in December 2017.

The Quezon City local government was found legally liable to compensate 56 heirs of the victims in 2020. They are obliged to dispense a total of ₱6 million. Mayor Joy Belmonte said her administration would not appeal the court ruling but noted that her former mayor Mathay could not be held liable since he died in 2013.

== See also ==
- Bangkang papel boys, survivors of the disaster, who attempted to gain the attention of president Gloria Macapagal Arroyo.
- 2026 Binaliw landslide – A similar incident at a dumpsite in Cebu City
