= Bagong Silangan =

Barangay in Quezon City, Metro Manila, Philippines

- Barangay
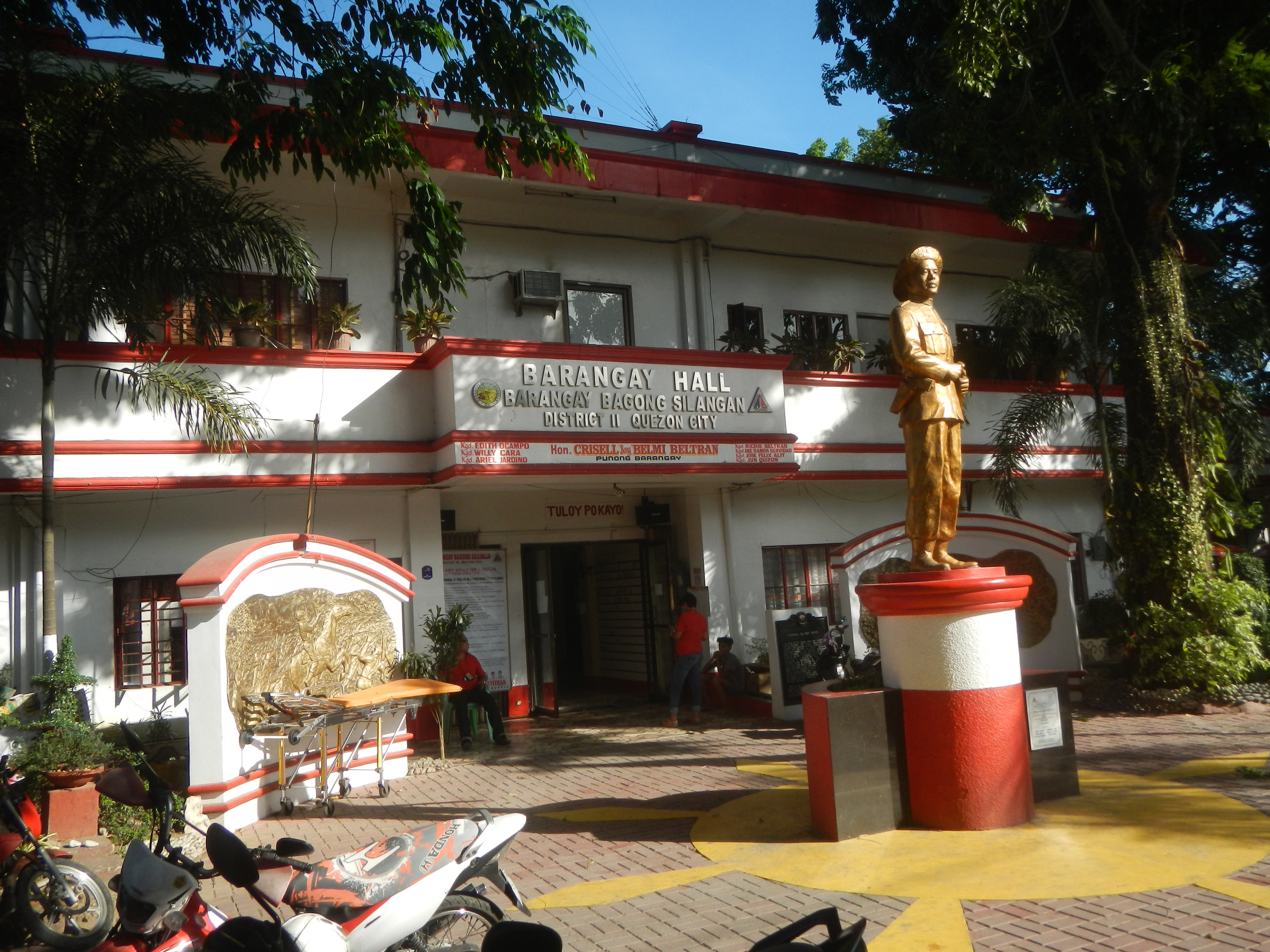
- Bagong Silangan Barangay Hall
- Interactive map of Bagong Silangan
- Location of Bagong Silangan within Metro Manila
- Coordinates: 14°42′34″N 121°6′0″E
- Country: Philippines
- Region: National Capital Region
- City: Quezon City
- District: 2nd District of Quezon City

Government
  - Type: Barangay
  - Barangay Captain: Wilfredo "Willy" L. Cara

Population (2020)
  - Total: 106,886
- Time zone: UTC+8 (PST)
- Postal Code: 1119
- Area code: 2

Bagong Silangan is a barangay located in the 2nd district of Quezon City, Philippines. Nearby barangays are Commonwealth, Batasan Hills and Payatas. Separated by a river in the east, the barangay leads to the Municipality of San Mateo in the province of Rizal.

== Geography ==
The barangay is divided geographically by having high and low areas. The border between these two areas is the Marikina Valley Fault System that runs parallel with the Marikina River. The High area western part of the Barangay is the edge of the Guadalupe plateau where most of Quezon City lies while the lower area, the eastern side of Barangay lies at the west bank of the Marikina River. Lying directly on the Marikina fault line, Bagong Silangan is considered as a high-risk area for earthquake. Many residential building, commercial and institutional buildings lies directly or lies near the fault. While the lower part of Bagong Silangan lying near the bank of the river is prone to heavy flooding. While most of the areas in Barangay is considered urban in density and infrastructure, about a quarter of Barangay's area are actually farmland the last remaining in Quezon City.

== History ==
Bagong Silangan shares its history with San Mateo, Rizal as it was once part of the municipality until it was ceded to Quezon City in the 1930s. In fact, notable events such as the Battle of San Mateo took place here. In the early 1960s, Bagong Silangan was known as a rich agricultural area where rice was the main product. In 1968, it is the relocation site given by Mayor Norberto Amoranto to selected families coming from Barangay East Triangle in Quezon City who refused to be resettled in Carmona, Cavite, thousand families was relocated but a selected hundred families plead to Mayor Amoranto that if there is a vacant land here in Quezon City, they begged off to relocate, with the bold decision headed by former Teniente del Barrio Laureano Ramos this pioneering families courageously settled here having no water supply, electricity and no accessible roads. Pioneering residents built their houses beside the creek in front of big rice fields.

Bagong Silangan is divided into different main areas like Purok, Sitio, Villages, Subdivisions, and Compound.

=== Purok ===
- Purok 1
- Purok 2
- Purok 3
- Purok 4
- Purok 5
- Purok 6
- Purok 7

=== Sitio ===
- Sitio Veterans (New Veterans Village) - is the largest sitio in terms of land area and is considered urban among the sitios of Bagong Silangan. It is even larger than the barangay proper. This landlocked area is located in the northwestern part of the barangay and is bounded by the Marikina River to the south. Sitio Veterans is divided into six areas: Areas 1, 2, 3, 4, 5, and 6. It also has its own feast day and patron saint celebration.
- Sitio Pugot - it is a territorial enclave located in northernmost part of Bagong Silangan and the neighboring barangay of Payatas.
- Sitio Kumunoy - is divided into three areas (A, B, and C) and located in the northernmost part of barangay. It is bounded by Area C in the west and Filinvest Subdivisions in the east.
- Sitio Bakal - is located in the southern portion of Payatas B and bounded by Sitio Veterans and Marikina River. It is a rural community and the smallest sitio in Bagong Silangan.
- Sitio Rolling Hills (Purok 7) - it is an enclave territory of Bagong Silangan, located in northeastern part of Sitio Veterans, and bounded by Barangay Payatas and the Municipality of Rodriguez, Rizal.

=== Subdivisions ===
- Bona Subdivision
- Violago Homes
- Filinvest 2
- Filinvest Heights
- Spring Country
- Spring Heights I and II
- Spring Valley
- Mountain View Subdivision
- Parkwood Hills Violago Homes Subdivision
- Winn Residences
- Meadows Residences

=== Villages ===
- Tagumpay HOA (Home Owner's Association)
- Humanity Village
- Country Homes (Paltok)
- D&A Vicente Village
- Covenant Village
- Clemencia Village
- Sulyap ng Pag-asa Village
- Sunrise View
- Diamond Ville

=== Compounds ===
- Sipna (Sitio Palay Neighborhood Association) - Originally a resettling site for those who have been displaced during the construction of Filinvest Subdivision
- Sumama-Ka (Gulpo)
- Bakas
- Sulyap ng Pag-asa Housing
- Dino Compound

=== Other areas ===
- Filside - is the smallest community in barangay located at Paltok.
- San Policarpio
- Comia
- Jubilee Phase 1 - 8
- Isla Pulang Bato
- Mt. Carmel
- Mapayapa
- Brookside - (headquarters of Tambuli ng Maralita, the sectoral newspaper of the Filipino Urban Poor) Gawad Kalinga-Brookside (Kapatiran San Jose Association)
- Hilltop
- Calamiong
- Pinagbuklod
- Tumana
- New Greenland

== Establishments ==
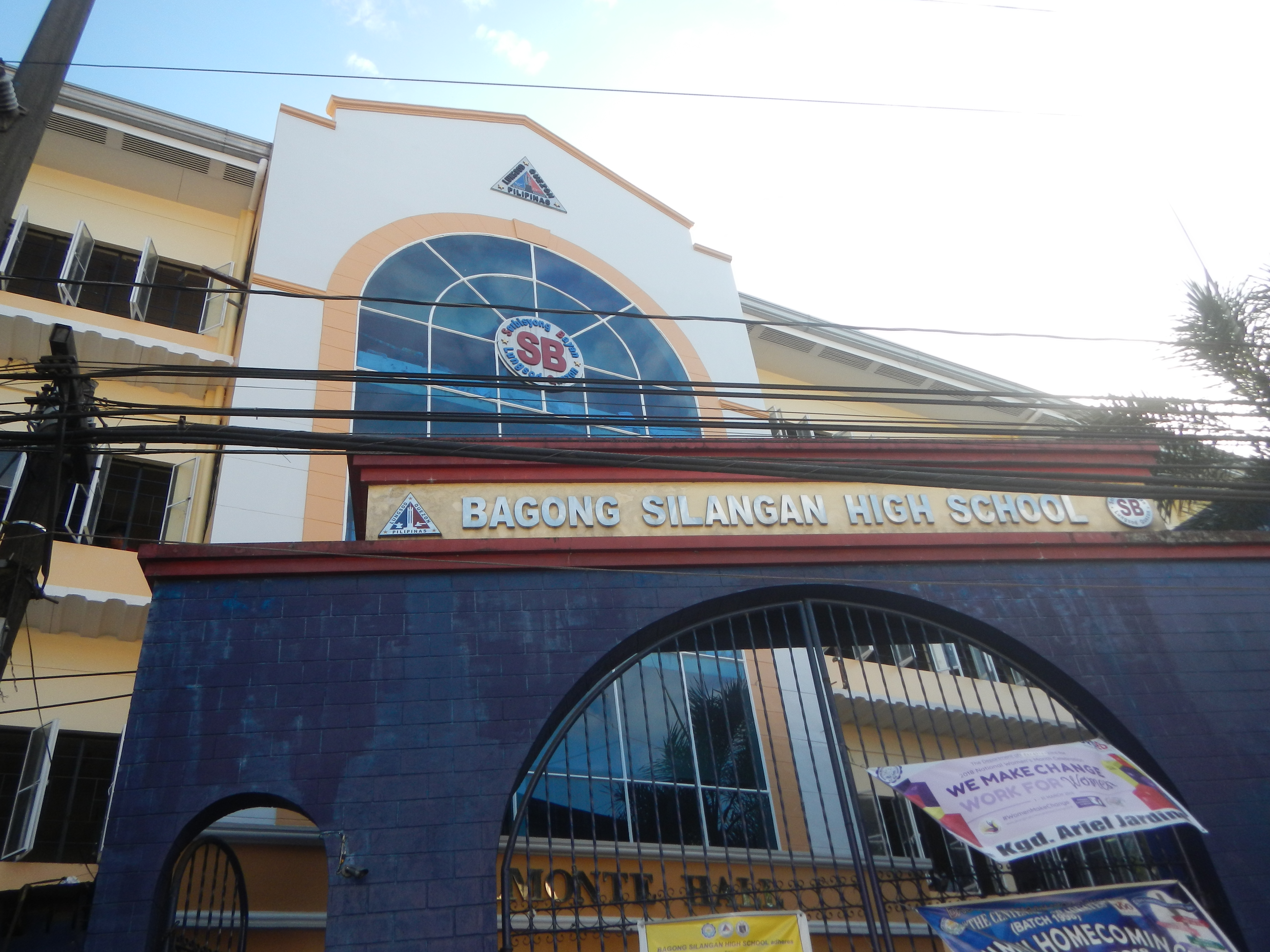
Bagong Silangan High School

=== Elementary schools ===
- Bagong Silangan Elementary School (School ID: 136539) Located in Gen. Villamor Street

=== High schools ===
- Bagong Silangan High School (School ID: 305332) Located in J.P Rizal Street

=== Parks and plazas ===
- Geronimo Park (formerly Adelina Park), where sports competitions and programs by the barangay and Sanggunian Kabataan council are held.

=== Barangay centers ===
- Barangay Hall (the second largest barangay hall in District 2)
- Barangay Hall Annex (Eagle street, Sitio Veterans)
- Bagong Silangan Big Health Center / Lying-In / TB-DOTS Center
- Bagong Silangan Public Library (2/F Susano Hall)
- Sangguniang Kabataan Hall (2/F Liban Hall)
- Barangay Public Library (Quezon City Public Library - Bagong Silangan Branch)

=== Place of worship ===
- Jesus Christ Community Church (JCCC) B.S.Proper Gen.Lucban St.
- Word of Peace Christian Family and Community Church, A Bonifacio St., Cor. Road 9, Brgy. Bagong Silangan
- Ang Dating Daan Lokal ng Bagong Silangan (Members Church of God International)
- San Isidro Labrador Parish in Bagong Silangan proper
- Sagrada Familia Parish in Sitio Veterans
- Lokal ng Bagong Silangan of Iglesia ni Cristo
- Muslim Mosque in Muslim area of Sitio Pugot
- JESUS is LORD J.P. Rizal St
- United Church of Christ in the Philippines, Sitio Veterans
- Glorious International New Horizon Mission Church, Road 7 Purok 5
- Chapel of St. Joseph the Worker, GK-Brookside KSJA
- Living Saints of God Christian Fellowship (LSGCF) Del Pilar Extension, Kumunoy
- Jesus Christ the Lifegiver Church International - Area 1 Sitio Veterans (Lifegiver Batasan)
- Bethanyland Bible Baptist Church (31-A Mabini. St., Brgy. Bagong Silangan, Quezon City)
- Great Commission Christian Church (Myna St. Sitio Veterans)
- Our Lady of Guadalupe Chapel (Blk 11 Canonical, cor Constitutional Rd., Violago Homes Brgy. Bagong Silangan, Quezon City)

=== Business establishments ===
Infrastructures such as public markets and commercial places lack in the barangay. Commercial businesses are mostly rented from private owners. Talipapa or commercial areas are not concentrated in one place. Commercial areas in the barangay are mostly found near areas of transportation or near schools. Currently, almost each sitio has its own talipapa, or local commercial area.

== Transportation ==
Bagong Silangan is serviced by its lone jeepney line that has a route from Bagong Silangan proper to Ever Gotesco Commonwealth and Sandiganbayan. Numerous tricycle lines are also present in the Baranggay such as Sitio Veterans route and Barangay Proper Route. Beside the usual route from Batasan, one way of accessing the Barangay is through San Mateo, Rizal. The Route is linked by Bagong Silangan-San Mateo foot bridge in Purok Uno.

== Population ==
As of 2016, the estimated population of the barangay has reached 132,501. It is one of the most densely populated barangays in the 2nd district of Quezon City. The casualties brought by the tropical storm Ondoy have caused several families to relocate in Batangas and Laguna, thus decreasing the population especially in flood-affected areas.

== Politics ==
The first Barrio Captain of Barangay Bagong Silangan was the late Army Captain (ret) Laureano S. Ramos

=== Barangay Captain ===
- Laureano S. Ramos (1968–1994)
- Eusebio P. Cuevas (1994–1997)
- Armando E. Endaya (August 1997 – November 2010)
- Crisell B. Beltran (December 2010 – January 2019)
- Wilfredo Cara (February 2019 – present)

== People and culture ==
Bagong Silangan is a growing barangay in Quezon City composed of people who came from different parts of the country. Tagalog is the primary language being spoken. Also numerous in the area are minority of Ilocano, Bisaya, Kapampangan, and Pangasinan speakers.

Bagong Silangan as an originally considered part of Rizal province shares its culture with the once homogeneous agricultural culture of the people from San Mateo. However, due to saturation of numerous cultures Bagong Silangan's cultural identity is evolved currently as more of heterogeneous which are mixed beliefs that are still expounding and evolving.

With the predominantly Catholic population, Bagong Silangan hosts cultural events that are heavily themed by their religion such as fiestas that are celebrated every May to give homage to their patron San Isidro Labrador. Additionally, minority religions such as INC, Protestants, Agnostics and others have their own celebration based on their discretion.

The barangay is also the home to informal settlers who occupy not only vast tracts of public and private lands but also riverbanks, creeksides, aqueducts and transmission lines.
