= Koshe =

Large landfill in Addis Ababa, Ethiopia

Coordinates: 8.97582°N 38.71224°E

Qoshee also known as Koshe is a large open landfill which receives rubbish and waste from Addis Ababa, the capital of Ethiopia. The name means "dirty" in Amharic.

The site is located in the southeastern part of Addis Ababa. It has been in operation for about 50 years and, in 2014, was about 36 hectares but shrinking as the result of regulation. A community of hundreds of rubbish pickers lived and worked there. They were known as "scratchers" as they typically carried a metal hook to pry open the waste which was compressed and delivered by garbage trucks.

In 2016, the local authority tried to close the site and relocate dumping to a new landfill site at Sendafa but opposition by local farmers caused the rubbish collectors to move back.

In March 2017, a landslide at the site killed more than 113 people, as recovery continues the death toll is expected to rise. The country announced three day-national mourning following the incident. Communications Minister Negeri Lencho declared that 38 males and 75 females lost their lives in this event.

One resident attributed the accident to construction work, as bulldozers were levelling the site for a biogas plant.

A 50 (fifty) megawatt waste-to-energy plant is being built nearby at Reppie to burn rubbish to generate electricity.

== Operation ==
Dumping of waste at Koshe landfill began in 1964, prior to that year, it was an unofficial site for burning dead animals. The landfill is located in Southwest Addis Ababa within the boundaries of Nifas Silk-Lafto and Kolfe Keranio. When Koshe became active, the surrounding area was sparsely populated and beyond the municipal master plan for Addis Ababa. Though, it was the only landfill in the capital city, few documented environmental studies were conducted or published for over 40 years.

Koshe is not a fenced site and has an inadequate buffer between it and other land use activities such as farming and schools, exposing many residents to environmental and health risks. In addition, the area is open to temporary and permanent scavengers. The landfill hosts about 500 scavengers who sell recovered materials from the waste to businesses and farmers.

The facility is being gradually phased out and replaced by a sanitary landfill in Oromia Special Zone, as of 2014, close to 17 hectares have been closed. Part of the land has been put to use including the construction of a ring road highway, siting of a proposed recycling center and a waste to energy project. In August 2016, protesting farmers blocked the pathway to the new landfill forcing the municipal government to direct solid waste disposal back to Koshe.

== Hazards ==
Koshe's unstable garbage mounds regularly experience landslides of varying degrees of severity, most of them minor. One landslide at Koshe led to the deaths of over 113 people who lived in the dump. Another landslide on the 10 June 2019 killed an elderly man.

== Sources ==
- Mahiteme, Yirgalem (Sep 2005). Landfill Management, its Impacts on the local Environment and Urban Sustainability. The Case of Repi Landfill Site, Addis Ababa, Ethiopia (PDF). International Congress on Environmental Planning and Management Conference. B. Brasilia: Norwegian University of Science and Technology Management (NTNU). ISSN 1502-2404. 8. Archived from the original (PDF) on 16 March 2017.
