= 2015 Shenzhen landslide =

Landslide of construction waste in Shenzhen, China

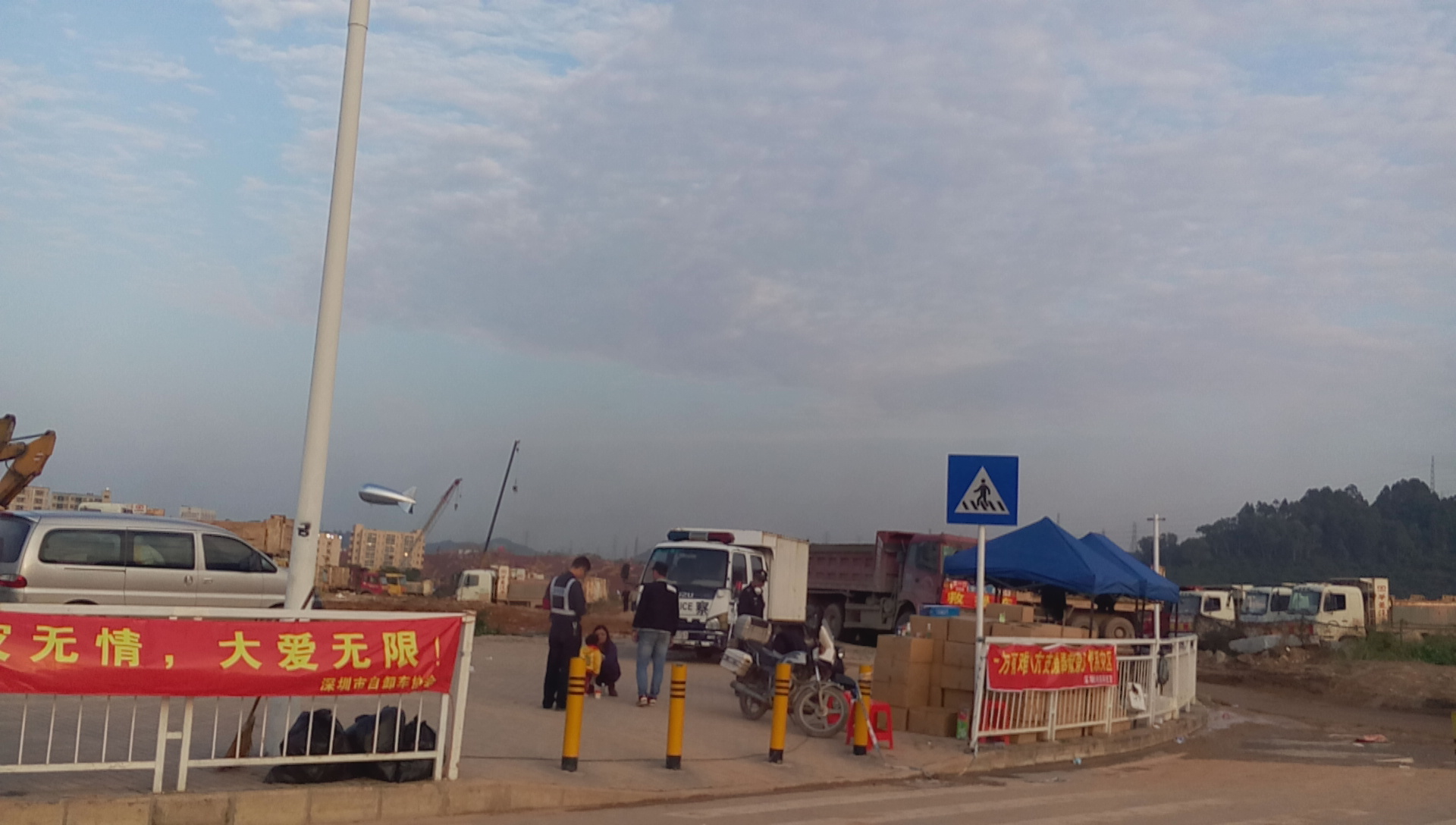
- Site of landslide as of 25 December 2015 from a distance
- Date: 20 December 2015
- Time: 11:40 am CST
- Location: Guangming New District, Shenzhen, Guangdong, China; 22°43′05″N 113°55′55″E
- Deaths: 69
- Injuries: 16
- Missing: 8
- Location of the Shenzhen landslide in Guangdong region

A landslide of construction waste occurred at Shenzhen, on 20 December 2015. It destroyed and buried industrial buildings and worker living quarters in the nearby industrial park. The death toll was 73, with 4 people reported missing. It was an industrial accident due to human negligence rather than a natural disaster. The local police arrested some of the people involved in the irregularities of the huge waste dump which had built up in the previous two years.

In April 2017, 45 people including government officials, were charged in local courts for negligence and corruption resulting in prison sentences and large fines.

== Background ==
It has been reported that waste material generated from construction work elsewhere had been piled up in a former quarry over the past couple of years. The adjacent natural hill did not slide, according to a geological report issued by the Ministry of Land and Resources on 21 December 2015.

== Landslide ==
On 20 December 2015 at 11:40 am a pile of construction waste, stored on a hillside, slid down in an avalanche of mud and debris, destroying 33 buildings and covering an area greater than ten hectares (25 acres) in the Hengtaiyu Industrial Park (恒泰裕工业园), which is, administratively, under Guangming New District of Shenzhen.

The landslide reportedly ruptured a nearby 400-metre (1,300 ft) section of the West–East Gas Pipeline and triggered an explosion which was heard about 4 kilometres (2.5 mi) away. According to The New York Times, PetroChina stated that this was untrue, although Reuters subsequently reported that PetroChina announced its plan to lay a temporary gas pipeline to replace the damaged one.

According to the Ministry of Land and Resources, the landslide occurred after a 20-storey-high mountain of dumped earth and construction waste collapsed.

== Emergency response ==
Chinese authorities had over 2,906 rescue personnel, including about 800 from the defence forces, excavating dirt and rubble at the Hengtaiyu industrial park.

More than 1,500 emergency rescuers were involved in the search for people trapped under the mud; as of 21 December, seven people had been rescued, and 76 people were still missing. Approximately 900 people have been evacuated from the area.

Evacuees were billeted at a nearby sports centre.

== Responses ==
Communist party General Secretary Xi Jinping and Premier Li Keqiang called for all-out rescue efforts. Also, Ma Xingrui, the Communist Party Secretary of Shenzhen, rushed back from Beijing to Shenzhen during the Central Economic Work Conference after hearing of this landslide.

The United Nations Secretary-General Ban Ki-moon extended his condolences to the families of the victims of the landslide.

On 25 December, Ma Xingrui, along with other city officials, issued a public apology to Shenzhen citizens.

On 27 December, the official who approved the construction of the waste dump that triggered the landslide, identified as the former director of Shenzhen Guangming New District Urban Management Bureau Xu Yuan'an (徐远安), jumped off a building in Nanshan District in an apparent suicide.

== Mourning ==
On 26 December, rescuers and officials mourned those who died in the landslide. The ritual was held seven days after the landslide, in line with the Chinese tradition. The mourners scattered white flowers on the debris.
