= Pamalican =

Island in the Philippines

Pamalican Island
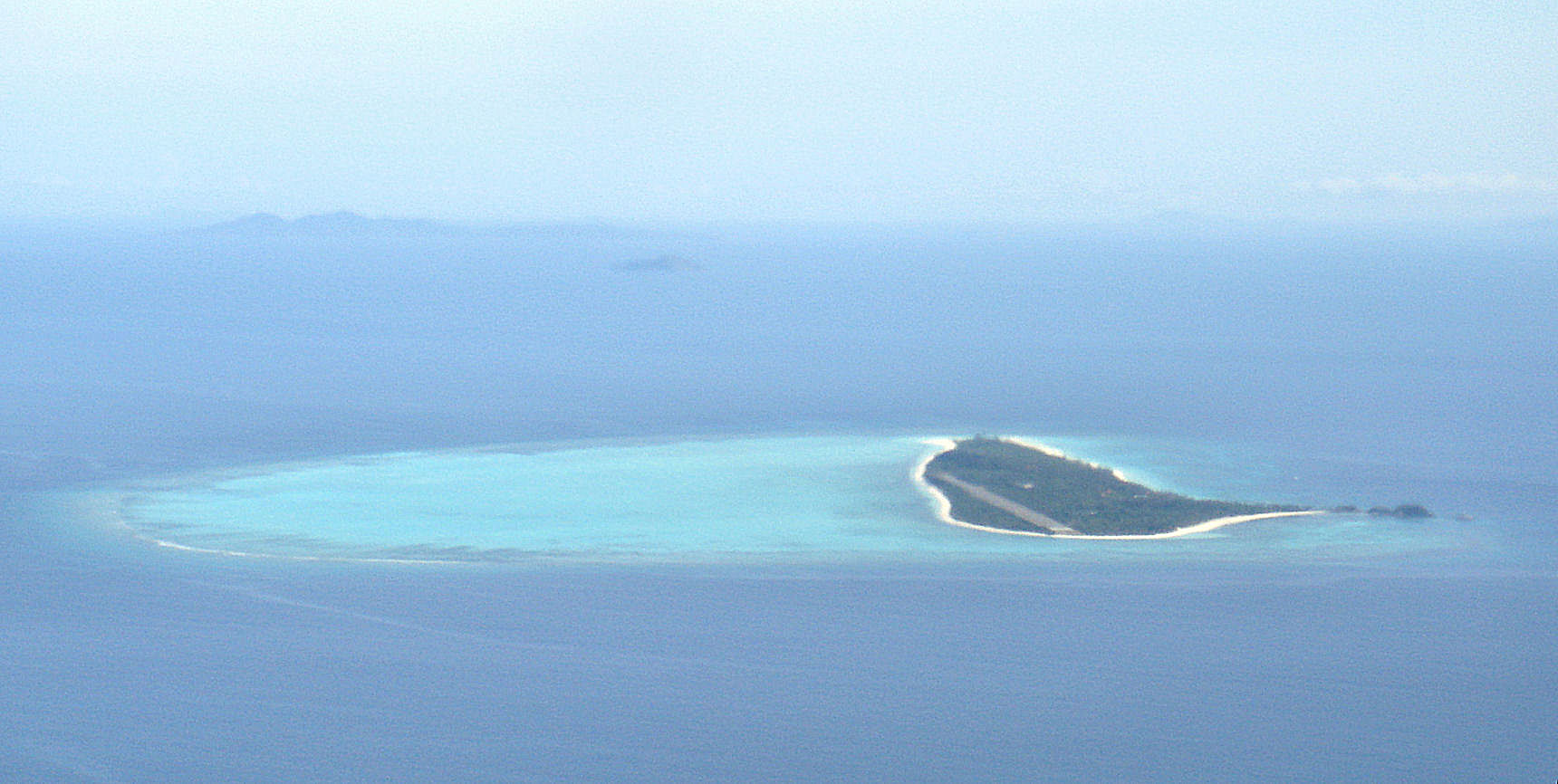
- Pamalican island with surrounding reef, from the air. On the horizon are visible the islands of Agutaya (left) and Cuyo (faintly, right)

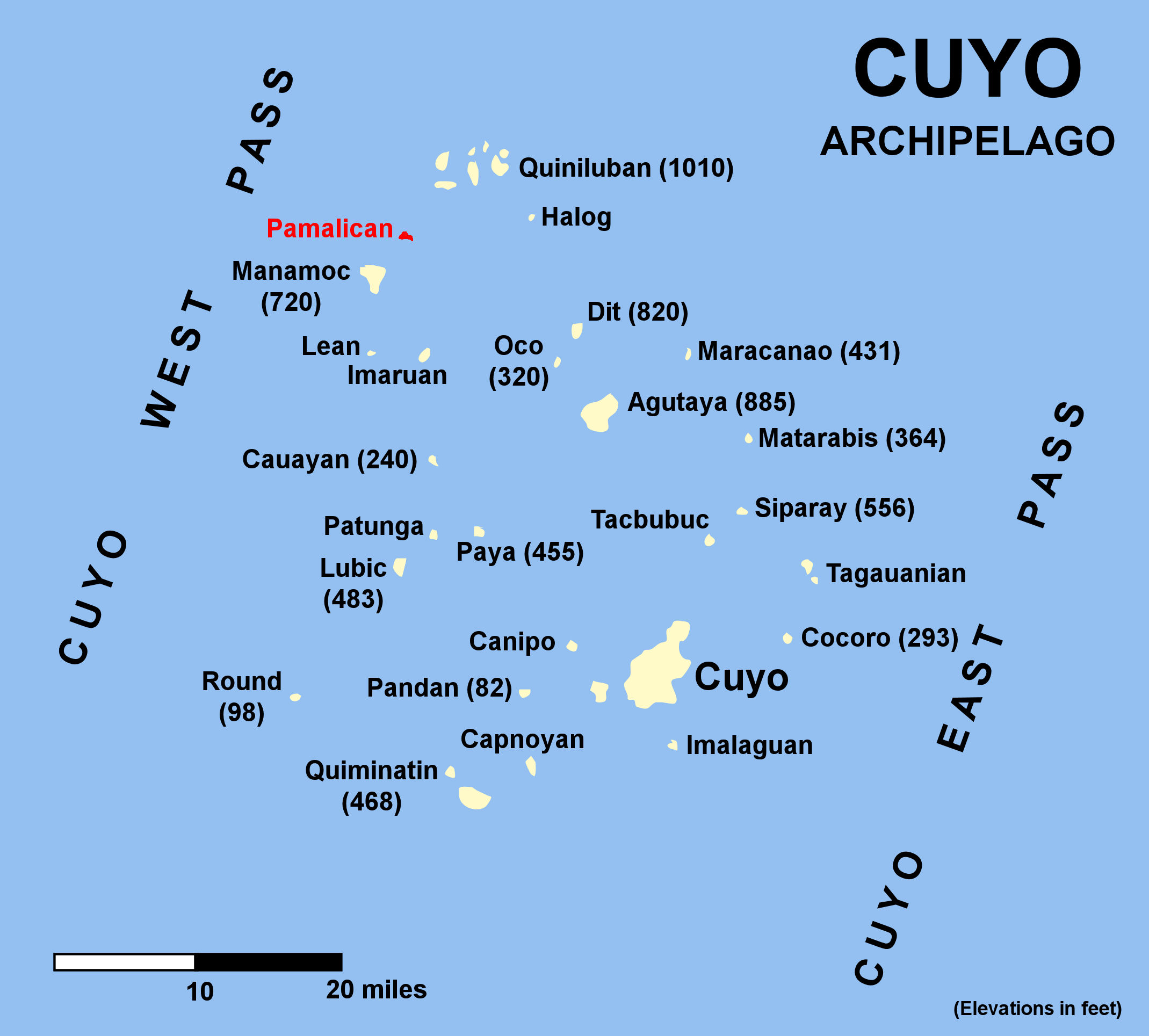
- Location in the Cuyo Archipelago

- Location within Philippines

Geography
- Coordinates: 11°21′12″N 120°43′51″E
- Archipelago: Cuyo Archipelago
- Adjacent to: Sulu Sea

Administration
- Philippines
- Region: Mimaropa
- Province: Palawan

Additional information

Pamalican Island, also spelled as Pamalikan, is a small and sandy island of the Cuyo Islands in the Sulu Sea, between Palawan and Panay, in the north part of the Palawan Province of the Philippines. The island is set in the middle of a 7-square-kilometre (2.7 sq mi) coral reef. It has a length of 2.5 kilometres (1.6 mi), and measures only 500 metres (1,600 ft) at its widest point. Pamalican can be found 7 miles southwest of Quiniluban island and 3 miles northeast of Manamoc island.

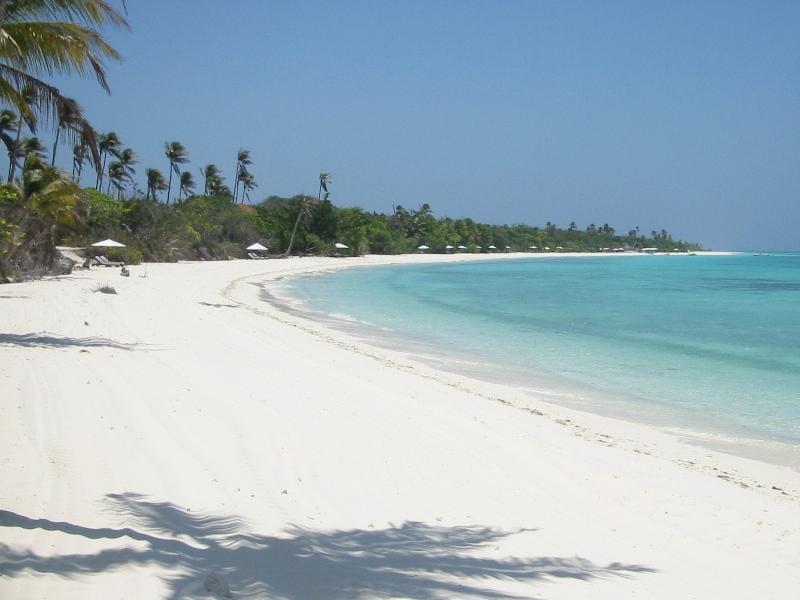
The main beach on the southern shore of Pamalican

The island was originally operated as a family-owned plantation by one of the oldest Spanish families of the island with last name "Rey" one of the known descendants was former Judge Jose P Rodriguez, a close friend and Law school Classmate of then former President Ferdinand Marcos . It was then purchased by Andrés Soriano Jr., a businessman. His children decided to build a resort on the island and leased the management responsibility to establish an exclusive resort. The island is private property and belongs in totality to Seven Seas Resorts and Leisure, Inc. (owned by the Sorianos). It is part of the resort group, Aman Resorts, under the name Amanpulo. About 40% of the employees are from the neighbouring Manamoc island.

The island is serviced by Dornier 228-202K planes flying from Manila, which are used to ferry customers and to bring supplies to the resort. Each bungalow comes with a personal buggy for transport around the island.

Diving activities are available, with coral, sea turtles, and rays among the reported wildlife encountered. Several windsurf boards and sails are provided at the "Windsurf hut" on the north shore. The shallow protected lagoon on the north shore is used for windsurfing, particularly during the northern monsoon season (November to May), when wind blows onshore.

== Weather ==
Weather (1951-1985)
Month	Rainfall (mm)	Rainy days	Cloudiness (Octas)
Jan	13.2	2	5
Feb	2.5	1	5
Mar	8.2	1	4
Apr	44.1	3	4
May	187.3	13	6
Jun	376.2	20	7
Jul	437.7	22	7
Aug	409.7	21	8
Sep	375	20	7
Oct	272.1	17	6
Nov	148.2	9	6
Dec	51.1	4	6
Annual	2329.3	133	—

== See also ==
- List of islands of the Philippines
