= Philippines Hobie Challenge =

Long distance catamaran race

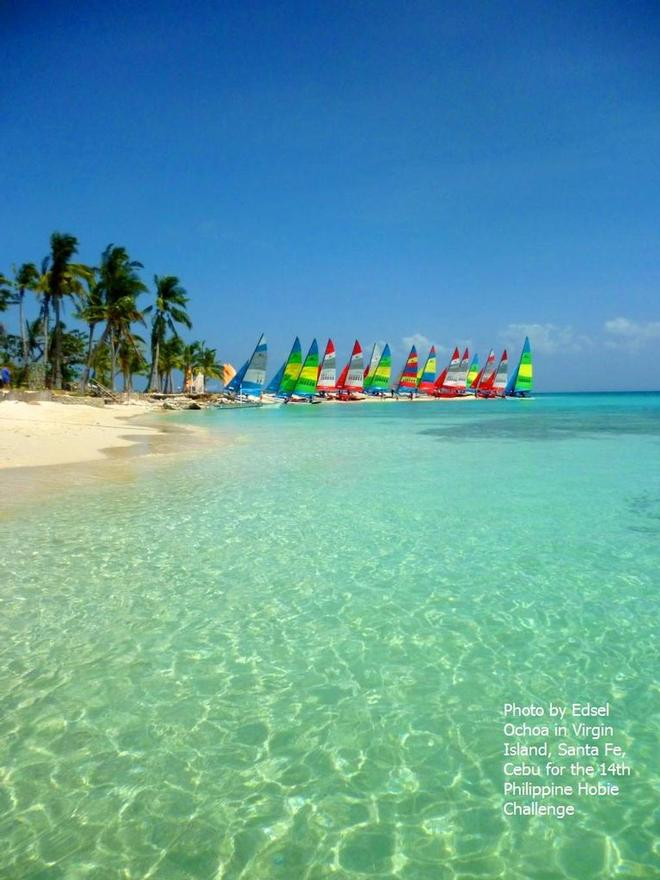

The Philippine Hobie Challenge is a long distance race using the Hobie 16 sailing catamaran manufactured by the Hobie Cat Company.

The event, organized by the Philippine Inter-island Sailing Foundation, Inc. (PHINSAF), consists of two race series: Inshore and Challenge Series. The Inshore Series consists of five short races of approximately 40 minutes each, where competitors sail around course marks anchored close inshore. In the Challenge Series, competitors will spend between five and eight hours a day sailing, all depending on their respective skills, the sea conditions and the prevailing wind, over 200 nautical miles, through the course of five daily passages along a route selected by the organizers.

The team with the lowest elapsed time from the origin to the destination flies home at the end of the week with the prestigious Philippine Hobie Challenge trophy.

In between the race legs, the participants take part in reaching out to the communities along the coastal villages, making donations of school supplies and basic medicines.

The Philippine Hobie Challenge is a unique way of gathering sailing enthusiasts and providing them an opportunity to appreciate the beauty of the Philippine islands, thereby creating awareness on caring for the environment and supporting the communities that inhabit these areas.

The Fossil Cup is an awards category founded by one of the most ardent supporters of the Challenge, and which uses a handicapping system that rewards sailors who improved the most during the week-long race, also had its share of the spotlight.

== History ==
The First Challenge

Sometime late 1999, a small group of international Hobie 16 catamaran sailors envisioned an extreme sailing event that will take them to different islands in the Philippines; six days in the open seas and camping in rustic areas. Thus, the Philippine Hobie Challenge had its relatively modest start in March 2001 with five (5) regional teams making the 190 nautical-mile passage from Lucena, Quezon down to Boracay. Michael Scantlebury, who was in the group that conceptualized the event, eventually took the honors of winning the first Challenge.

Dreaming the Impossible

The highly successful inaugural event proved the concept of long distance racing in Hobie 16 catamarans to be workable and the Challenge had its repeat in March 2001. This time, entries had more than doubled to twelve (12), including teams flying in from Hong Kong, Australia and Europe. Using experience gained during the first event, the organizers scheduled a 5-race inshore series and the Challenge series with 5 consecutive daily passages, taking the teams 154 nautical miles from the Batangas resort of Maya-Maya down to Maricaban Bay in Northern Palawan. The team from Down Under, Andrew Keag and Naomi Angwin, bested the rest of the fleet to win the 2nd Philippine Hobie Challenge. In 2002, the Challenge went Northwest, taking fifteen (15) teams from Sta. Maria, Ilocos Sur down to Subic Bay, Zambales. Blood Red, the team of Chris Steilberg, Dave Harris and Krishan George took honors in this 230 nautical mile race.

Challenge 14 competitors

Subsequent Challenges

In 2003 the offshore Challenge series started from the whale shark capital of the Philippines, Donsol, and ended down in Cebu. Peter Davies, with David Harris, finished first, and with 1 win at Donsol and 2 in Alegre, Haswell and Heider made up for their relatively poor offshore performance by garnering a first in the Inshore series. 2004 marked the 5th Hobie Challenge one of the best challenges ever, taking the sailors from the icing sugar sands of Boracay all the way across to Palawan. This marked the largest fleet of Hobies yet - 27 teams from all over the globe. This trip included a visit to Amanpulo and even an African style safari on Calauit Island.

Dancers at the challenge 15 Presentation night

A great success

Now firmly established on the Hobie Sailing calendar, the organizers of the Philippine Hobie Challenge are charting new routes. By promoting sailing as a way to experience the Philippines' eco- and adventure-tourism destinations, they promise another exceptional event.

Indeed, the Philippine Hobie Challenge is fast growing to be one of the most exciting and anticipated sailing events in Southeast Asia.

=== Previous Challenges ===
Challenge and Year	To	From
HC1 2000	Lucena	Boracay
HC2 2001	Maya Maya	Maricaban
HC3 2002	Vigan	Subic Bay
HC4 2003	Donsol, Sorsogon	Maricaban
HC5 2004	Vigan	Club Paradise, Palawan
HC6 2005	Malapascua Island, Cebu	Panglao Island
HC7 2006	San Jose	Boracay
HC8 2007	Hermana Major	Club Paradise
HC9 2008	Sorsogon	Surigao
HC10 2010	Laiya	Boracay
HC11 2011	Lucena	Boracay
HC12 2012	Coron, Palawan	El Nido, Palawan
HC13 2013	Dawal Resort (Candelaria, Zambales)	Anvaya Cove Resort (Morong, Bataan)
HC14 2014	Malapascua_Island, Cebu	Anhawan Resort (Oton, Iloilo)
HC15 2015	La Luz resort, Laiya, Batangas	Canyon De Borocay Resort, Canyon Cove, Nasugbu
HC16 2016	Mactan, Cebu	San Juan, Siquijor

== Past winners ==
=== Past Challenge Series Winners ===
PHC 1 2000 1st Mike Scantlebury (GBR) and Douglas Hansen-Luke (HKG), 2nd Tony Robinson (AUS) and Jill Novera / Carol Pablo / Gia Veloso (PHI), 3rd Mark Haswell (GBR) / Rex Puentespina (PHI) & Jill Novera (PHI) / Ranny Lavina (PHI).

PHC 2 2001 1st Andrew Keage / Naomi Angwin / Aaron Worrall (AUS), 2nd Andrew and Marijun Locke (PNG), 3rd Tony Stearns and Janet McCullough (USA).

PHC 3 2002 1st Chris Steilberg (CHN), Dave Harris (GBR) and Krishan George (ROM), 2nd Mike Scantlebury (GBR) and Peter Davies (HKG), 3rd Luigi Manzi (ITA) and Gia Veloso (PHI).

PHC 4 2003 1st Peter Davies (HKG) and Dave Harris (GBR), 2nd Tony Stearns (USA) and Janet McCullough (USA), 3rd Luigi Manzi (ITA) and Elle Singson (PHI).

PHC 5 2004 1st Andrew Keage (AUS) and Aaron Worrall (AUS), 2nd Tony Stearns and Janet McCullough (USA), 3rd Peter Manvis (NED) and Wiebe Shuitema (NED).

PHC 6 2005 1st Bob Engwirda (AUS) and Jerome Binder (AUS), 2nd David Harris (HKG) and Krishan George (ROM), 3rd Andrew Locke (PNG) and David Levinge (PHI).

PHC 7 2006 1st Bob Engwirda (AUS) and Brad Wilson / Aaron Worrall (AUS), 2nd Bruce Tardrew (AUS) and Gerard Ryan (AUS), 3rd Tony Stearns (USA) and Janet McCullough (USA).

PHC 8 2007 1st Bob Engwirda / Aaron Worrall (AUS) and Brad Wilson (AUS), 2nd Bruce Tardrew (AUS) and Gerard Ryan (AUS), 3rd Mark Haswell (UK) and Noelle Schifferer (PHI).

PHC 9 2008 1st Bob Engwirda (AUS) and Bradley Wilson (AUS), 2nd Bruce Tardrew (AUS) and Debbie Muller (AUS), 3rd Aaron Worrall (AUS) and Sarah Pipes (AUS).

PHC 10 2009 1st Bob Engwirda (AUS) and Bradley Wilson (AUS), 2nd Bruce Tardrew (AUS) and Debbie Muller (AUS), 3rd Aaron Worrall (AUS) and Sarah Pipes (AUS).

PHC 11 – 2011 1st Bob Engwirda and Brad Wilson (AUS), 2nd Andrew Locke and Marijun Locke (AUS), 3rd Bruce Tardew and Eric Tomacruz (AUS/PH).

PHC 12 – 2012 1st Mick Butler and Brad Wilson (AUS), 2nd Andrew Locke and Ramon Dala (AUS/PH), 3rd Bruce Tardrew and Sarah Turnbull (AUS).

PHC 13 – 2013 1st Luigi Manzi and Yvonne Manzi (ITA), 2nd Andrew Locke and Eric Tomacruz (AUS/PH), 3rd Monchu Garcia and Bianca Garcia (PH).

PHC 14 – 2014 1st Bob Engwirda and Brad Wilson (AUS), 2nd Bruce Tardrew and Sarah Turnbull (AUS), 3rd Grahame Southwick and Sharon Rayner (FIJI).

PHC 15 – 2015 1st Geoff Rowdon and Rosie Phelan (AUS), 2nd Andrew and Tony Boyd (AUS), 3rd Andrew Locke and Rob Watson.

PHC 16 – 2016 1st Kerli and Ali Corlette (AUS), 2nd Bruce Tardrew and Sarah Turnbull (AUS), 3rd Grahame Southwick and Sharon Rayner (AUS/FIJI).

=== Past Inshore Series Winners ===
PHC 1 2000 1st Tony Robinson (AUS) and Richly Magsanay (PHI), 2nd Mark Haswell (GBR) and Jill Novera (PHI), 3rd Mike Scantlebury (GBR) and Rich Wald (GBR).

PHC 2 2001 1st Andrew Keage / Naomi Angwin / Aaron Worrall (AUS), 2nd Tong Shing (HKG) and Carina Croly (FRA), 3rd Tony Robinson (AUS) and Gia Veloso (PHI).

PHC 3 2002 1st Mike Scantlebury (GBR) and Peter Davies (HKG), 2nd Raul Bulaong (PHI) and Nestor Soriano (PHI), 3rd Mark Haswell (GBR) and Ana Katigbak (PHI).

PHC 4 2003 1st Mark Haswell (GBR) and Caroline Heider (GER), 2nd Diether Ocampo / Nestor Soriano / David Levinge (PHI), 3rd Peter Davies (HKG) and Dave Harris (GBR).

PHC 5 2004 1st Aaron Worall / Andrew Keage / Sean Seibold (Aus), 2nd Tong Shing and Evergreen Lee (HKG), 3rd Tony Stearns and Janet McCullough (USA).

PHC 6 2005 1st Andrew Locke (PNG) and David Levinge (PHI), 2nd Bob Engwirda (AUS) and Jerome Binder (AUS), 3rd Gary Baguley (AUS) and Adrian Baguley (AUS).

PHC 7 2006 1st Bob Engwirda (AUS) and Brad Wilson / Aaron Worrall (AUS), 2nd Bruce Tardrew (AUS) and Gerard Ryan /Andrew Keage (AUS), 3rd Richley Magsanay (PHI) and Rafael Buitre (PHI).

PHC 8 2007 1st Bob Engwirda (AUS) and Brad Wilson (AUS), 2nd Andrew Locke (PNG) and Stewart Brown (AUS), 3rd Bruce Tardrew (AUS) and Gerard Ryan (AUS).

PHC 9 2008 1st

PHC 10 2009 1st

PHC 11 2011 1st

PHC 12 2012 1st

PHC 13 2013 1st

PHC 14 2014 1st

PHC 15 2015 1st Andrew Locke and Rob Watson (AUS), 2nd Eric Tomacruz and Andy Aguila (PHI), 3rd Bruce Tardrew and Sarah Turnbull (AUS).

PHC 16 2016 1st Geoff Rowdon and Rosie Phelan (AUS), 2nd Grahame Southwick and Sharon Rayner (AUS/FIJI), 3rd Bruce Tradrew and Sarah Turnbull (AUS).

== Outreach Program ==
An important part of the Challenge is the Outreach Program, which provides an opportunity for sailors to give back to the communities that the race will pass.

A school destroyed by a Typhoon receives help from the Outreach program

The Outreach Program provides the following aid to the beneficiaries: Renewable Energy Enterprises Foundation of Oakland, California (REEF) provides SOLAR LAMPS- The remote areas where the challenge ventures rarely have electricity and the outreach program provides solar lamps that provide up to 8 hours of lighting for children to study by. Since it can eliminate the use kerosene lamps, the solar lanterns improve family's indoor air quality. The result children are less often missing school, the lanterns save family's 30 % of their income, and provide evening light for families. The solar lanterns are free to families and last five years.

EDUCATIONAL SUPPLIES- Giving children these materials will help them continue learning and reduce the cost to their parents.

MEDICAL SUPPLIES- These contributions will greatly help community health centers to provide for basic health needs and first aid treatments.

== Hobie 16 ==

The 16 is the most popular Hobie Cat, both for recreational and racing purposes and as a one-design racer. The boat is 16'7" long, 7'11" wide, and has a mast 26'6" tall, but only weighs 320 pounds. As with the 14, it is intended to be sailed from the beach through the surf, and to be surfed back in on the waves to the beach. Instead of daggerboards or centreboards, the 16 has asymmetrical hulls which act like foils and keep the boat from crabbing, or slipping sideways from the force of the wind. Both jib and main sails are fully battened and total 218 square feet (20 m^{2}). A trapeze is usually used by the crew and helmsman.

While sailing a 16-foot boat offshore may sound fool hardy the Hobie 16 is the most ideal vessel for offshore sailing because its sail plan is low tech and allows the boat to be sailed up to 30 knots of wind by a person with reasonable skills while its strong hull and no centre board allows it to sail over shallow water and contact reefs with only very minor damage.

== Other Challenges ==
There are racing classes all around the world for a range of Hobie Sailboats. These include the Fiji Hobie Challenge which is an annual race held over a similar format and the Tanzacat Challenge and Zanzibar Raid held in Tanzania, East Africa.

== See also ==
- List of multihulls
