= Macroglossum wolframmeyi =

Scientific classification
- Kingdom: Animalia
- Phylum: Arthropoda
- Class: Insecta
- Order: Lepidoptera
- Family: Sphingidae
- Genus: Macroglossum
- Species: M. wolframmeyi

Binomial name
- Macroglossum wolframmeyi Eitschberger & Treadaway, 2004

Species of moth

Macroglossum wolframmeyi is a moth of the family Sphingidae first described by Ulf Eitschberger and Colin G. Treadaway in 2004. It is known from the Cuyo Archipelago in the Philippines.
