= Bong Suntay =

Filipino businessman and politician

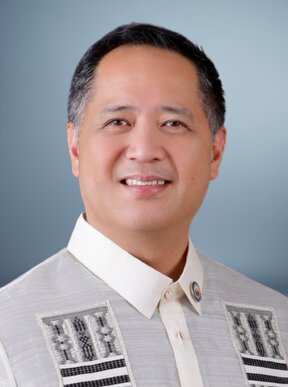
- Official portrait, 2026

Member of the House of Representatives from Quezon City's 4th district
- Incumbent
- Assumed office June 30, 2025
- Preceded by: Marvin Rillo
- In office June 30, 2019 – June 30, 2022
- Preceded by: Feliciano Belmonte Jr.
- Succeeded by: Marvin Rillo

House Deputy Minority Leader
- Incumbent
- Assumed office July 30, 2025
- Leader: Marcelino Libanan

Member of the Quezon City Council from the 4th district
- In office June 30, 2007 – June 30, 2016
- In office June 30, 1998 – June 30, 2004

Personal details
- Born: Jesus Manuel Angel Cabochan Suntay; November 15, 1970 (age 55)
- Party: NPC (2007–2009; 2012–2018; 2026–present)
- Other political affiliations: See list: UNA (2024–2026); SBP (2018–2024); PDP (2018–2024); Liberal (2009–2012); LDP (2004–2007); Lakas–CMD (until 2004)
- Spouse: Sheila Guevara
- Relations: José Abad Santos (great-grandfather); Pedro Abad Santos (great-granduncle); Jamby Madrigal (first cousin once removed)
- Children: 5
- Education: De La Salle University; San Beda College (LL.B)

Jesus Manuel Angel "Bong" Cabochan Suntay (born November 15, 1970) is a Filipino businessman, lawyer, and politician who has served as the representative of Quezon City's 4th district since 2025; he previously held the seat from 2019 to 2022.

The owner of a taxi operator in Metro Manila, Suntay heads the Philippine National Taxi Operators Association. He is also the founder of the liquefied petroleum gas chain Cleanfuel.

Suntay was a longtime member of the Quezon City Council, serving from 1998 to 2004 and from 2007 to 2016. He narrowly defeated Marvin Rillo in the 2025 local elections by 200 votes.

== Early life and education ==
Jesus Manuel Angel Cabochan Suntay was born on November 15, 1970. His father, Angelo Abad Santos Suntay, was a linotypist and an executive at A. Soriano Corporation. His mother, Carolina Cabochan, is part of the Cabochan family who owns the El Oro Engravers.

Suntay was encouraged by his father to pursue a career on computers during his high school years but the younger Suntay decided to become a lawyer and businessman.

His paternal great-grandfather, Ángel Suntay was a representative for the first district of Bulacan from 1928 to 1931.

He then attended the De La Salle University for his pre-law studies. Suntay graduated from San Beda College with a law degree in 1996, passing the bar examination the following year. He worked as an associate and partner lawyer but also started his own business ventures.

== Business career ==
Around 1989, Suntay established Basic Taxi, a taxi business when he was still a freshman student at San Beda. He started with five second-hand units but grew to a fleet of 1,200 units.

Suntay has promoted the usage liquefied petroleum gas for taxis in the Philippines to combat rising prices of gasoline. He tested the conversion kit on five of his taxi units in 2004. He later acquired exclusive rights to sell auto LPG conversion kit from Tartarini in Italy. Shell installed a LPG conversion facility in his garage.

He later established Cleanfuel in 2006 since large traditional petrol companies are unwilling to service LPG to small taxi operators. As of 2022, Cleanfuel has 134 stations in Luzon and Visayas including those which are still being set up.

== Civic involvement ==
Suntay became president of Philippine National Taxi Operators Association Inc. (PNTOA) in the 2000s. As head, he had to balance calling for fare increase amidst rising cost of fuel. He also served as president of the National Taxi Association Federation (NTAF).

When carsharing service Uber entered the Philippines market, Suntay lobbied for it and similar services to get regulated.

== Political career ==
Suntay served as city councilor in Quezon City for its fourth district from 1998 to 2004 and from 2007 to 2016. He intended to run for Congress in the 2001 election, but opted to back out in favor of Mayor Mel Mathay's candidacy in the fourth congressional district. Suntay instead ran for reelection in the 2001 Quezon City council election, receiving the highest number of votes among the candidates.

As the city council's majority floor leader in the early 2000s, Suntay presided over a time when relatively few resolutions and ordinances were being passed, with him receiving some criticism for the "snail-paced legislative work" as chairman of the Committee on Laws, Rules, and Internal Government. In mid-2002, a feud erupted between two factions of the city council regarding the reorganization of council committees, with the majority side (headed by Suntay) being opposed in its reorganization plan by the "conscience bloc" led by councilor Ariel Inton. By late 2003, Suntay was no longer majority floor leader.

In 2004, he opted not to seek re-election as councilor to run for representative of Quezon City's fourth district, but lost to incumbent congresswoman Nanette Castelo-Daza, who was on the slate of reelectionist mayor Sonny Belmonte alongside councilor Inton.

He was the longest serving majority floor leader in the Quezon City Council. Known by the moniker 'Superman', he is known for using motif associated with the DC Comics superhero for his campaigning and imagery.

In the 2019 election, Suntay who was running under PDP–Laban got elected as Quezon City's representative in the House of Representatives for its fourth congressional district. He lost his re-election bid in 2022 to Marvin Rillo of Lakas by 2,000 votes.

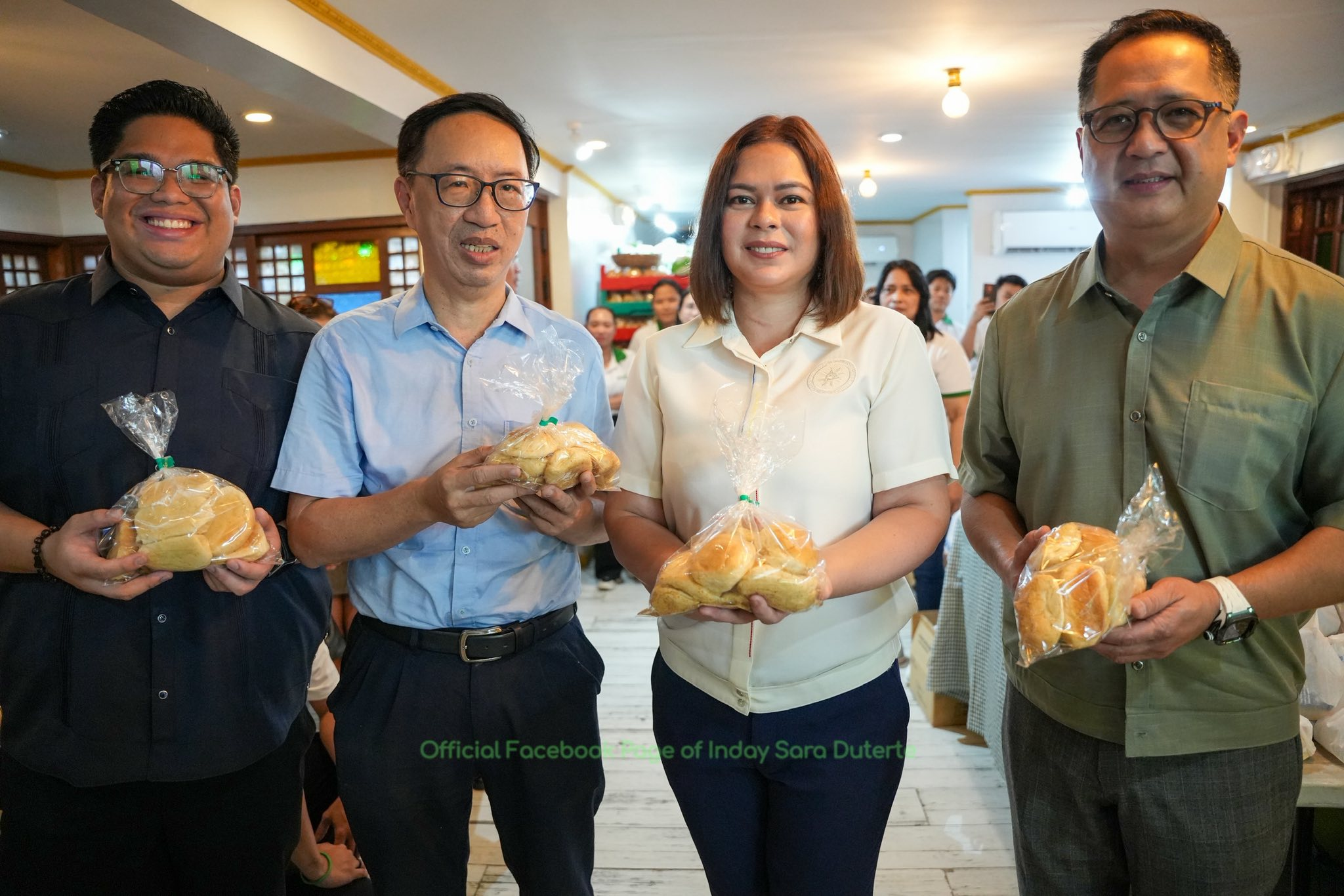
Suntay (rightmost) with Vice President Sara Duterte (2nd from right) during World Pandesal Day in Quezon City in 2025

After leaving PDP–Laban in 2024 for the United Nationalist Alliance, Suntay ran again for the same position in the 2025 election under the "Team Serbisyo" slate, holding a pro-Duterte stance as candidate and asking voters to back the "DuterTen" senatorial candidates. His 28-year-old nephew Jesus Miguel "Migs" C. Suntay also ran in his district for the position of councilor. Both of them faced accusations of vote buying, but Bong denied the claims, alleging that they were filed by someone linked to congressman Rillo. A witness later recanted his testimony, claiming that he was coerced into making the claim by Rillo's side. He won the election after narrowly beating incumbent congressman Rillo by 239 votes.

== Controversies ==
=== 2001 assault charges ===
On December 22, 2001, Suntay was with his wife Sheila within the Verde de Pasadena Tower in San Juan, Metro Manila when the latter received a text message from a young male resident in the building asking for a share of Sheila's lunch as gymmates. According to a police report, Suntay followed his wife to the resident's apartment, then proceeded to confront him with a pistol and accuse his wife of cheating on him, upon which Suntay pistol-whipped him unconscious; the resident also claimed that Suntay fired shots into the air. Criminal charges were later filed against Suntay by policemen before the Rizal provincial prosecutors on January 8, 2002.

=== Lewd remarks referencing Anne Curtis ===
Suntay's manifestation in the House Justice Committee on 3 March 2026 that was stricken out of the record

On March 3, 2026, during a House Committee on Justice hearing on impeachment complaints against Vice President Sara Duterte, Suntay made remarks referencing actress Anne Curtis that drew criticism from fellow lawmakers for apparent indecency and sexism. He argued that Duterte cannot be punished for sedition for calling herself "designated survivor" and made the point that similarly he cannot be charged in a hypothetical scenario where he had heightened "desire" seeing Curtis at the Shangri-La Plaza shopping mall since any thoughts he had is just his imagination. The comments were later ordered stricken from the official record for being inappropriate and unrelated to the proceedings. He asked for apology from Curtis but insisted that he has no malicious intent and that his analogy is sound. On March 5, women's rights advocates led by former GABRIELA Representative Liza Maza filed an ethics complaint against Suntay over his remarks on Curtis. While the Philippine Commission on Women condemned Suntay for his remarks toward the actress, stating that his comments are a form of sexual harassment that violates the Safe Spaces Act. The agency asked Suntay to issue a public apology and take gender sensitivity training, and requested administrative action from the House Ethics Committee. Curtis herself commented on Suntay's controversial remarks in a Facebook post on March 7, stating that she does not accept his "non-apology". On June 3, 2026, the House Ethics Committee formally reprimanded Suntay and ordered him to render voluntary community service, attend a gender sensitivity seminar to be conducted by the Philippine House Committee on Women and Gender Equality, and publicly apologize to Curtis and women in general.

== Personal life ==
Suntay is married to businesswoman Maria Cecilia "Sheila" Guevara, with whom he had five children. They first met and dated each other in the 1980s. One of their sons, Renzo, died by suicide on April 21, 2018 at age 20 after having suffered from depression. At the height of Suntay's remarks on Anne Curtis on March 2026, Guevarra apologized to Curtis for the comments made by Suntay. She released a statement to confirm that she and her children did not laugh at them and do not support his remarks given during a talk show interview broadcast.

== Ancestry ==
Ancestors of Bong Suntay

8. Ángel Suntay
4. Angel Suntay Jr.
9. Edna Rollins
2. Angelo Suntay
10. José Abad Santos
5. Luz Abad Santos
11. Amanda Teopaco
1. Bong Suntay
3. Carolina Cabochan

Political offices
House of Representatives of the Philippines
Preceded by Feliciano Belmonte Jr.	Member of the House of Representatives from Quezon City's 4th district 2019–2022	Succeeded by Marvin Rillo
Preceded by Marvin Rillo	Member of the House of Representatives from Quezon City's 4th 2025–present	Incumbent
