= Manamoc =

Island in the Philippines

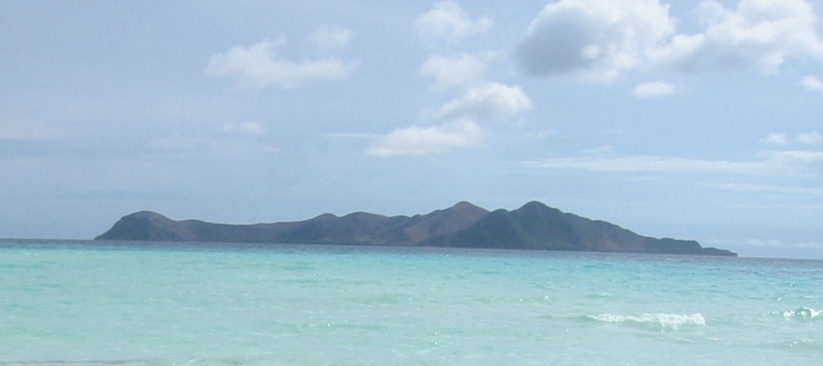
- Manamoc island, as seen from the north

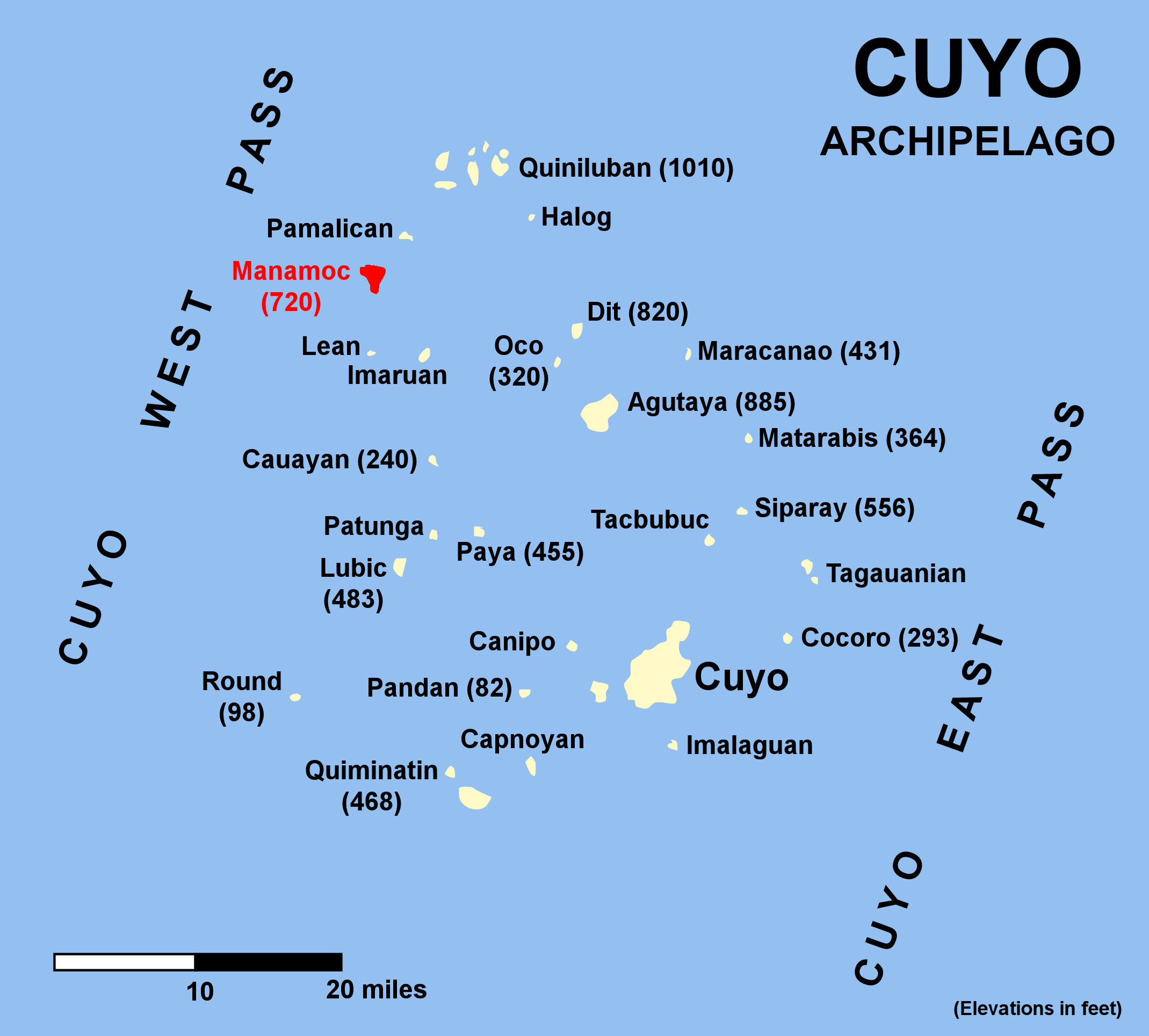
- Manamoc is located in the northwestern part of the Cuyo Islands group

Geography
- Location: Sulu Sea
- Coordinates: 11°18′24.71″N 120°41′7.42″E
- Archipelago: Quiniluban Island group
- Length: 1.75 mi (2.82 km)
- Highest elevation: 720 ft (219 m)
- Highest point: Mt. English

Administration
- Philippines
- Region: IV-B Mimaropa
- Province: Palawan
- Municipality: Cuyo

Demographics
- Population: 2,001 (2007)

Additional information

Manamoc is an island-barangay in the Sulu Sea, in the northeastern part of the province of Palawan in the Philippines. It is a part of the Quiniluban group of islands of the Cuyo Archipelago between the islands of Palawan and Panay.

== Geography ==
Manamoc, like most of the islands of Cuyo, is of volcanic origin. The almost circular island has a diameter of about 1.75 miles (3.8 km) and has a total land area of 1,275 acres (516 hectares). It is surrounded by coral reefs and abundant marine life. A break in the reef allows boats to enter the lagoon in the southwestern part of the island. This lagoon has about 3 feet of water at low tide.

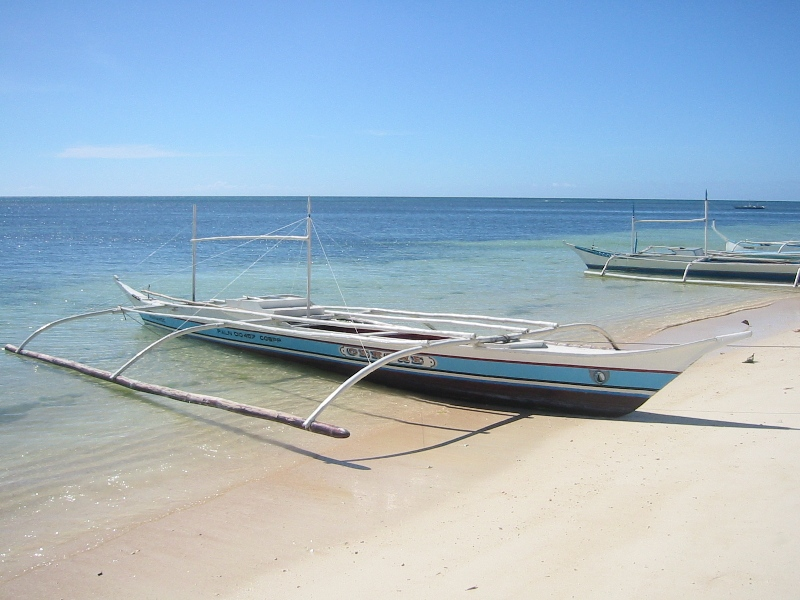
Fishing boats beached in front of the main village.

The highest point of the island is Mt. English which is about 220 m (721 feet) and is open for trekking.

=== Climate ===
The weather is broadly regulated by the dry and windy Northeast monsoon from January to May, and the rainy Southwest monsoon from June to November, with a high probability for cyclones between August and November.

Climate data for Manamoc
Month	Jan	Feb	Mar	Apr	May	Jun	Jul	Aug	Sep	Oct	Nov	Dec	Year
Average rainfall mm (inches)	13.2 (0.52)	2.5 (0.10)	8.2 (0.32)	44.1 (1.74)	187.3 (7.37)	376.2 (14.81)	437.7 (17.23)	409.7 (16.13)	375.0 (14.76)	272.1 (10.71)	148.2 (5.83)	51.1 (2.01)	2,329.3 (91.70)
Average rainy days	2	1	1	3	13	20	22	21	20	17	9	4	133

== Economy ==
The island is essentially supported by fishing, seaweed cultivation and farming.

Three miles northeast of Manamoc is the exclusive resort of Amanpulo, on Pamalican Island. Since its opening, a large percentage of Manamoc's inhabitants has found work as employees in the neighboring resort. The establishment also provided the residents of Manamoc and the other neighboring islands with other means of livelihood like supplying some food products and materials for the resort.

== Infrastructures ==
Seacology has provided solar energy system to provide power to the community's schools, barangay hall and medical clinic in exchange for an agreement to protect the marine area for 20 years.

There is cell phone service in the island provided by Smart with the tower located on Mt. English. The Zip code of the island is 5318.

== Tourism ==
Tourism on the island is still developing. The island is for guests who love to commune with nature. It is popular with tourists from all over the world who hope to get off the beaten track and spend time with local people. Foreign tourists from the Pamalican resort who are curious about island community life are regular visitors.

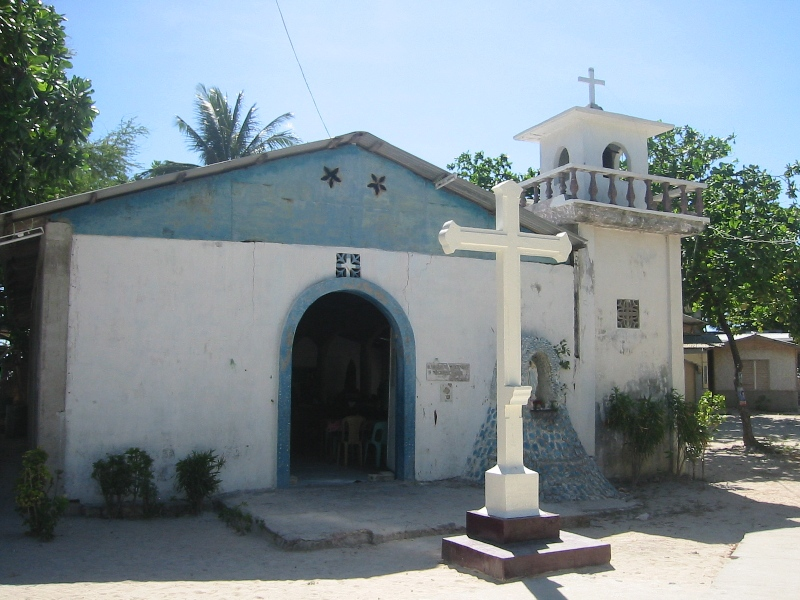
The Catholic church in Manamoc.

The island is a good place for snorkeling. With the help of Seacology Germany, a non-profit organization with the purpose of preserving the highly endangered biodiversity of islands around the world, the villagers established a 267-acre Marine Protected Area around Manamoc in 2002.

There are only a few bars and restaurants on the island that cater mostly to locals.

== Demographics ==
As of 2007, Manamoc has a population of 2,001. The island is clean, prosperous and well-equipped with educational facilities for children.

The main religion on the island is Roman Catholicism.

== See also ==
- List of islands of the Philippines
