= Quiniluban Group =

Group of islands in the Philippines

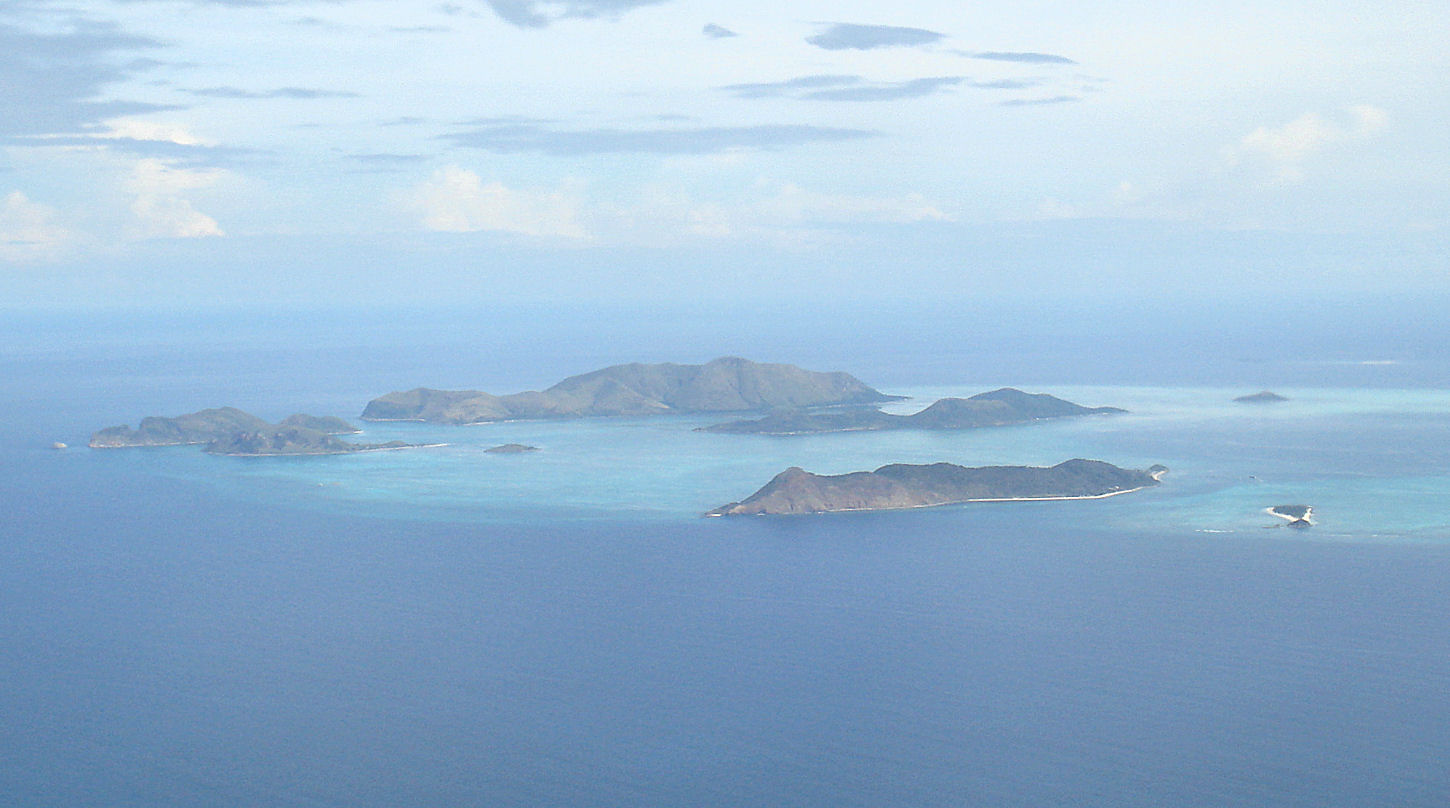
- The Quiniluban island group, in the extreme north of the Cuyo Archipelago

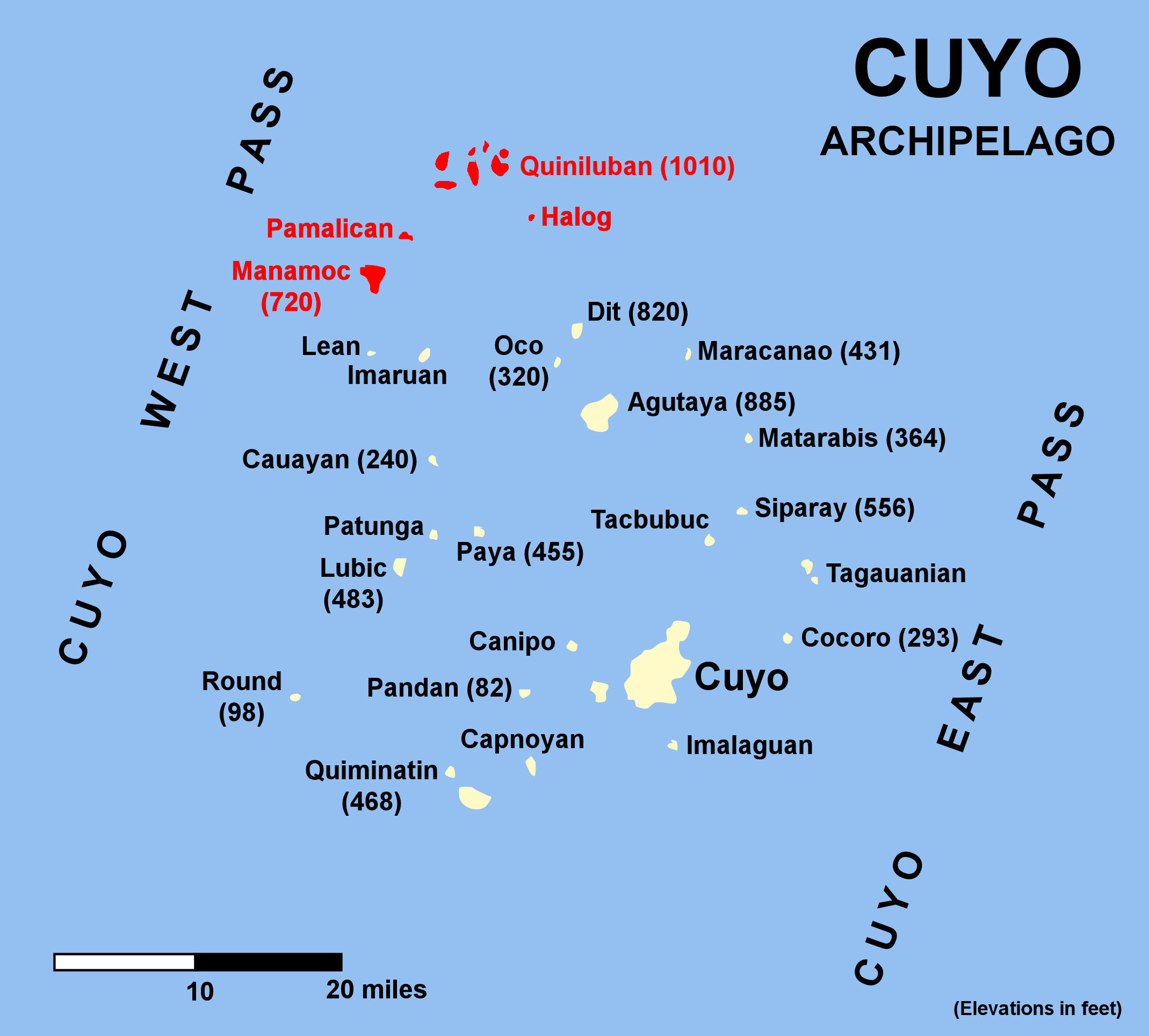
- The Quiniluban group (in red), in the Cuyo Archipelago

Geography
- Location: Sulu Sea
- Coordinates: 11°26′00″N 120°48′00″E
- Archipelago: Cuyo Archipelago
- Highest elevation: 1,010 ft (308 m)

Administration
- Republic of the Philippines
- Region: Mimaropa (Region IV-B)
- Province: Palawan
- Municipality: Agutaya

The Quiniluban Group is a group of islands in Palawan Province of the Philippines situated between the islands of Palawan and Panay in the Sulu Sea. The group is the northernmost in the Cuyo Archipelago, consisting of several islands and rocks. The easternmost of which is a circular group of islands surrounded by reef about 6 nautical miles (11 km; 6.9 mi) in diameter. The largest of the circular group is Quiniluban Island. The island group also includes the upscale resort island of Pamican located about 5.6 nautical miles (10.4 km; 6.4 mi) southwest of the circular group, and Manamoc Island located 3.0 nautical miles (5.6 km; 3.5 mi) further southwest of Pamilacan.

These mostly hilly islands are of limestone formation, have no permanent streams, and very little wood, but are covered with tall grass. Most of the inhabitants live along the coast, and there is some cultivation on the larger islands.

The island group is under the jurisdiction of the Municipality of Agutaya, Palawan, with its town center located 16 to 18 nautical miles (30 to 33 km; 18 to 21 mi) southeast of the Quiniluban Island Group on Agutaya Island, depending on the location.

== Islands ==
- Quiniluban Island, the largest of the island group, is located northeast of the group, and has a maximum elevation of 293 metres (961 ft) 1,010 ft (310 m). From northerly directions, it appears as a sharp cone. From easterly directions it appears as a ridge with a dome-shaped elevation in the center. It has the reddish-brown color of cogon regions and makes a prominent landmark. Most of the inhabitants of the island live on its western and southern coast.
- Alcisiras Island, also known as Algeciras Island, is a small inhabited island with 167 metres (548 ft) high elevation, lying southwest of Quiniluban.
- Calumpin Island, is one of the three small islands located between Quiniluban and Alcisiras Islands.
- Yanuta Island, also known as Nianuta Island, is a small inhabited island between Quiniluban and Alcisiras Islands.
- Arorunga, also known as Ararungua Island, is a small inhabited island located between Alcisiras and Quiniluban.
- Mandit Island, is a small inhabited island with an elevation of 32 metres (105 ft), lying 3/4 nautical mile (1.4 km; 0.86 mi) . Two small rocky island
- Cambug Rock lie on the northwestern part of the reef.
- Maligun Island, also known as Maliguin Island, is an inhabited island of about 150 metres (490 ft) in elevation. It is the northernmost inhabited island of the group and of the Cuyo Archipelago and located 1 nautical mile (1.9 km; 1.2 mi) northeastward of Alcisiras and 0.34 nautical miles (0.63 km; 0.39 mi) north of Quiniluban. Two smaller uninhabited rocky islets as located north and northeast of Maligun Island.
- Silad Island is a small tadpole-shaped island with an elevation of about 123 metres (404 ft) and located about 0.37 nautical miles (0.69 km; 0.43 mi) west of Maligun Island and 0.78 nautical miles (1.44 km; 0.90 mi) north of Alcisiras. Most of its inhabitants live in the tail-like southern section of the island.
- Namaroc Island, also known as Namarac Island, is small inhabited island located 0.31 nautical miles (0.57 km; 0.36 mi) west of the southern tip of Silad Island or 0.79 nautical miles (1.46 km; 0.91 mi) north northwest of Alcisiras Island.
- Tinitiuan Island, 117 metres (384 ft)

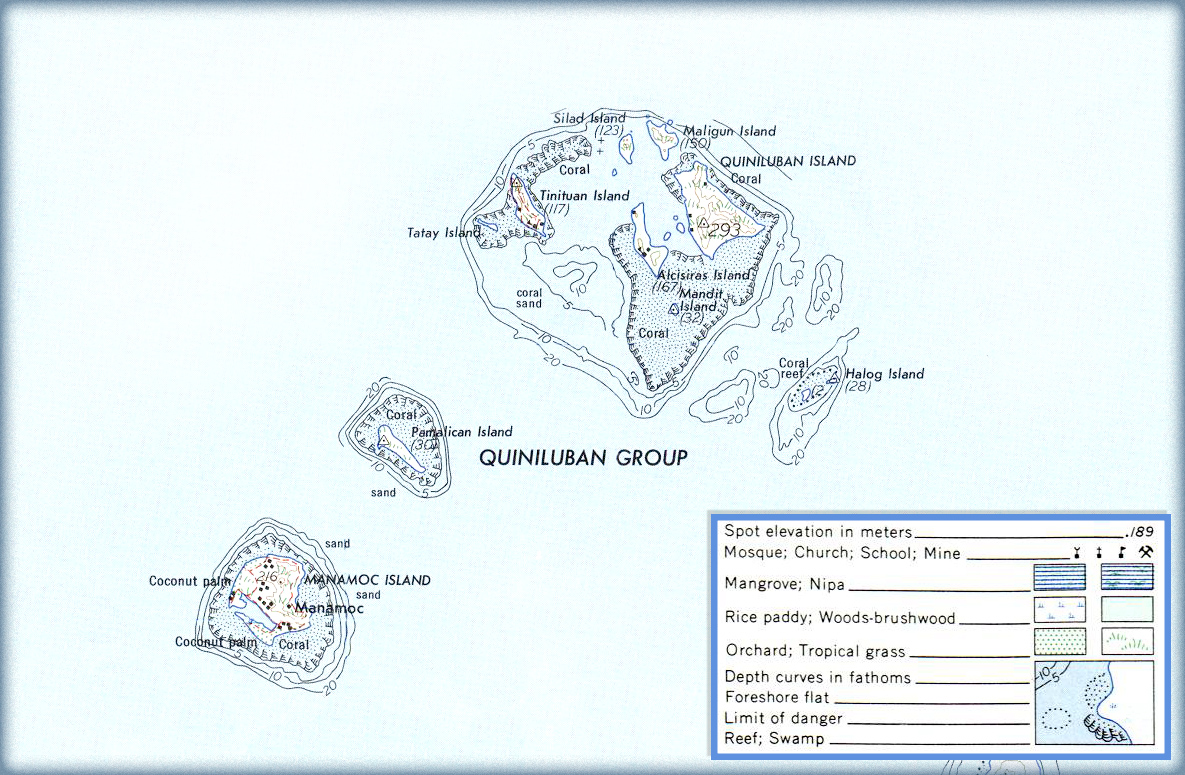
Quiniluban Island Group map in the Cuyo Archipelago.

- Tatay Island is a small inhabited island, 0.42 nautical miles (0.78 km; 0.48 mi) southwest of Tinutuan Island.
- Henalubatan Rock is a small uninhabited rocky islet 0.28 nautical miles (0.52 km; 0.32 mi) eastward of the easternmost tip of Quiniluban Island.
- Halog Islands are two small isles located 3 nautical miles (5.6 km; 3.5 mi) southeast of Quiniluban Island. The channel separating these islands from Quiniluban is free from navigation dangers, though there are several banks in it with depths from 6 to 9 fathoms (36 to 54 ft).
- Pamalican Island, 7 miles southwestward of Quiniluban Island, is low, covered with a scrub growth. The higher of its two hills is 30 metres (98 ft) (83 ft old) feet high. The island is surrounded by a coral reef which extends about 1 mile off the northeast side.
- Manamoc Island lies about 3 miles southwest of Pamalican. It is 216 metres (709 ft) 720 feet (220 m)-old high, roughly circular in form, about 1 ¾ miles in diameter, and surrounded by a wide coral reef partly bare at low water. A break in the reef permits the shallow draft native boats to enter the lagoon in the southwestern part of the island. This lagoon has about 3 feet of water at low tide.

== See also ==
- List of islands of the Philippines
