= Agutaya =

Municipality in Palawan, Philippines

- Municipality
- Municipality of Agutaya
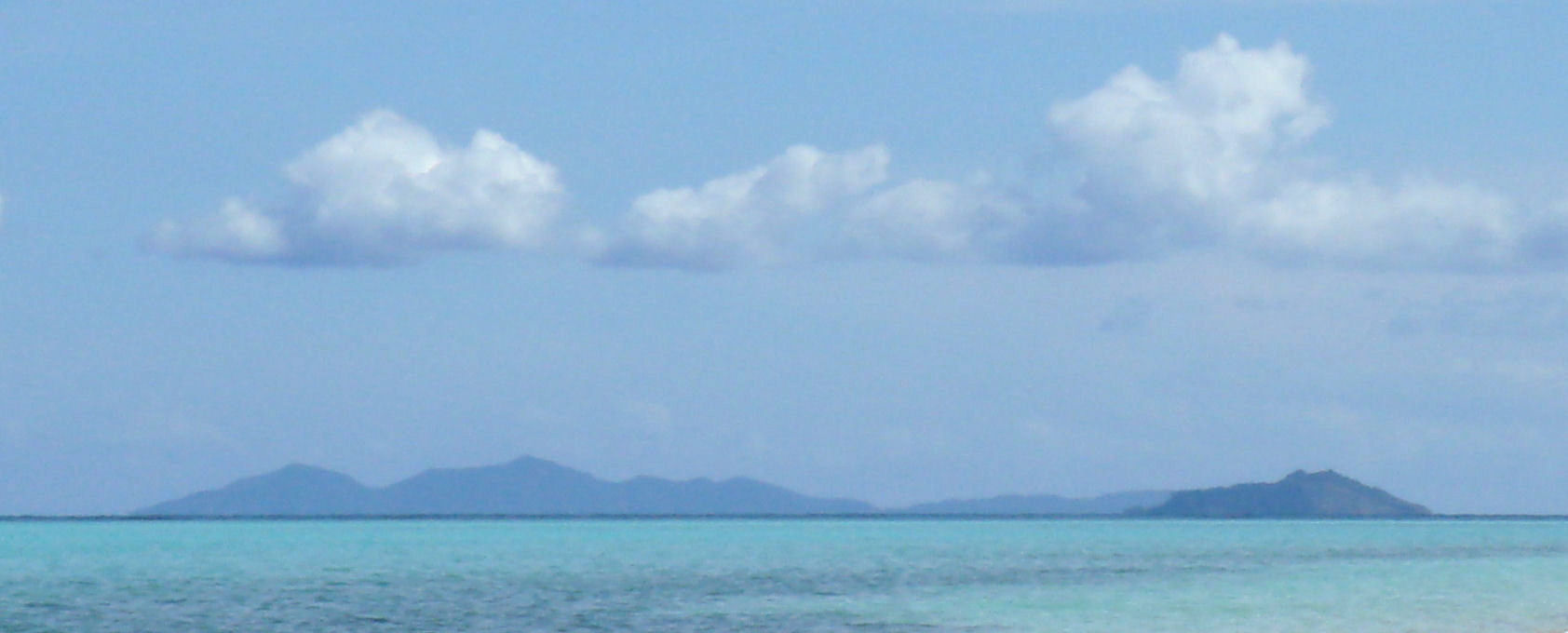
- Agutaya island, and small Eke island in the foreground

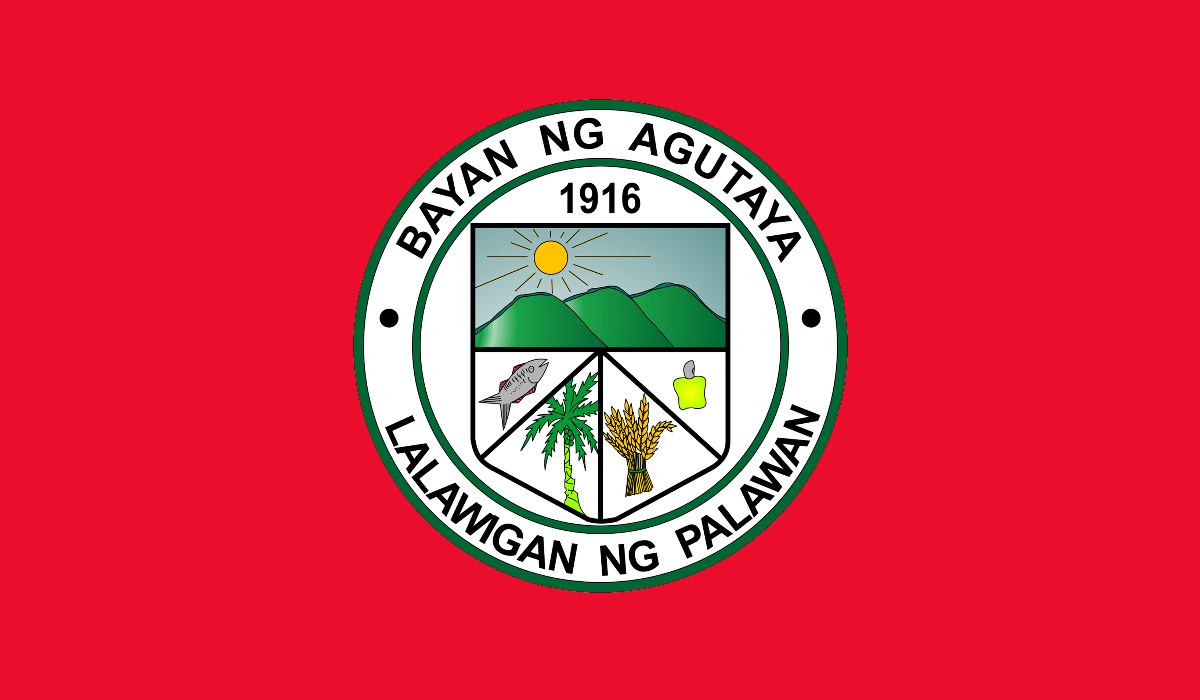
- Flag Seal

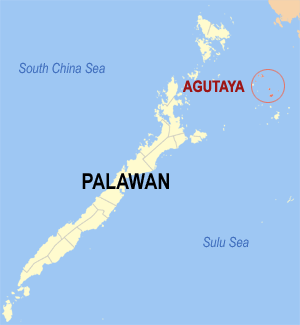
- Map of Palawan with Agutaya highlighted
- Interactive map of Agutaya
- Location within the Philippines
- Coordinates: 11°09′07″N 120°56′23″E
- Country: Philippines
- Region: Mimaropa
- Province: Palawan
- District: 1st district
- Founded: 1916
- Barangays: 10 (see Barangays)

Government
  - Type: Sangguniang Bayan
  - Mayor: Fernando G. Ilustrisimo Sr.
  - Vice Mayor: Joey B. Zumaraga
  - Representative: Rosalie Salvame
  - Municipal Council: Members: Joey B. Zumaraga; Henry G. Aban; Rodil O. Dacuan; Nena R. Abela; Godofredo M. Zumaraga Jr.; Elpedio D. Zumaraga Jr.; Ronnie A. Laab; Arlito B. Bacosa Jr.
  - Electorate: 7,815 voters (2025)

Area
  - Total: 37.31 km^{2} (14.41 sq mi)
- Elevation: 0 m (0 ft)
- Highest elevation: 250 m (820 ft)
- Lowest elevation: 0 m (0 ft)

Population (2024 census)
  - Total: 13,351
  - Density: 357.8/km^{2} (926.8/sq mi)
  - Households: 3,174

Economy
  - Income class: 5th municipal income class
  - Poverty incidence: 23.93% (2023)
  - Revenue: ₱ 92.91 million (2024)
  - Assets: ₱ 260.2 million (2024)
  - Expenditure: ₱ 81.55 million (2024)
  - Liabilities: ₱ 56.56 million (2024)

Service provider
  - Electricity: Palawan Electric Cooperative (PALECO)
- Time zone: UTC+8 (PST)
- ZIP code: 5320
- PSGC: 1705302000
- IDD : area code: +63 (0)48
- Native languages: Agutaynen; Cuyonon; Palawano; Tagalog

Agutaya, officially the Municipality of Agutaya (Tagalog: Bayan ng Agutaya), is a municipality in the province of Palawan, Philippines. According to the 2024 census, it has a population of 13,351 people.

An island municipality, it is the eastern part of the Cuyo Archipelago in the Sulu Sea, and covers several islands, including its namesake Agutaya Island, which is the second largest island of the Cuyo archipelago, as well as Diit, Halog, Maracanao, Matarawis (also spelled Matarabis), Eke, and Quiniluban islands.

== Etymology ==
The town was formerly known as Agutayan before it became Agutaya. The name Agutayan is believed to have been derived from the word *agunan*, a root crop that grew abundantly in the wild and served as a staple food for the early inhabitants. The syllables “agu” and “yan,” along with “ta” meaning “here,” were combined into “agu-ta-yan,” conveying the idea that *agunan* was plentiful in the area. Over time, the final “n” in Agutayan was dropped, resulting in the present name, Agutaya.

== History ==
=== Precolonial and Spanish era ===
Oral history suggested that Agutaya may have existed in precolonial times. After the Spanish conquest, Agutaya was an independent barrio of Cuyo, with its officials appointed by the gobernadorcillo of Cuyo. To Christianize the Agutayanens, they built a church in 1683 called the Church of St. John the Baptist, which turned into a parish in 1692. One of the most important things that happened during this period were the Moro attacks, most notably in 1636, forcing the Spanish authorities to remodel the church into a fort. It was headed by the townspeople and the encomendero Antonio de Rojas, and started the construction in 1700, completing it in 1748. Since then, it was known as the Agutaya Fort or the Baluarte de San Juan Bautista. The church was used as the town's evacuation and emergency center during World War II.

=== Revolutionary era ===
In 1898, Emilio Aguinaldo became the President of the First Philippine Republic. To secure his control over Palawan, he sent General Esteban Kausapen to Palawan to liberate the region from Spanish control. He first entered Agutaya from Mindoro where the people offered no resistance, but the Spanish priest fled to Cuyo. No lives nor property were destroyed and Kausapen's authority collected tribute from the people in the form of rice, cows, pigs, and chickens. Some Agutayanos joined as soldiers.

=== American era ===
Sometime between 1900-1904, an American soldier was sent in the town to teach reading, writing and arithmetic, leading to the establishment of the first English school in Agutaya. It was established as a permanent municipality in 1916 and the people were allowed to vote for their public officials. In 1917, when the United States joined World War I, many Agutayano enlisted as National Guards under Captain Vicente Fernandez of Cuyo. However, they were unable to go as Germany surrendered before they could even leave the country.

=== World War II ===
During the war, Gaudencio Abordo, an Agutayano, became renowned for becoming the Governor of Free Palawan, leading a guerrilla movement along with other leaders. During this war, two sailboats were lost. One came from Mindoro and out of the 60 men only 4 survived. Another sailboat was hired by lepers from Culion who wanted to return home to Panay and Negros Island. When they arrived in San Jose in Antique, they were ordered by the Japanese government to return to Culion. They were reluctant so they anchored at San Pedro near San Jose. When they arrived, the Japanese machine gunned all of them and set the sailboat on fire.

== Geography ==
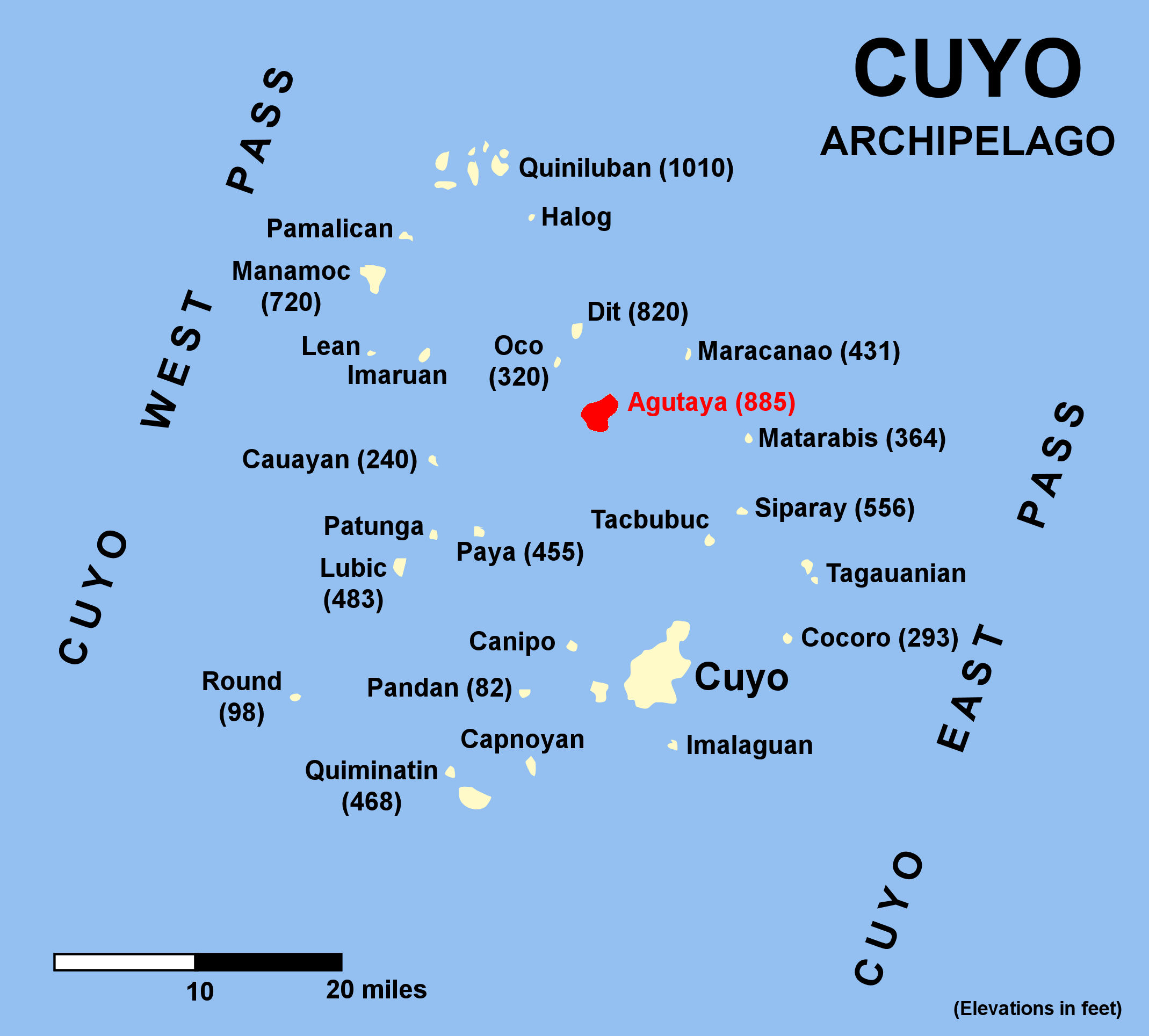
Map of Agutaya

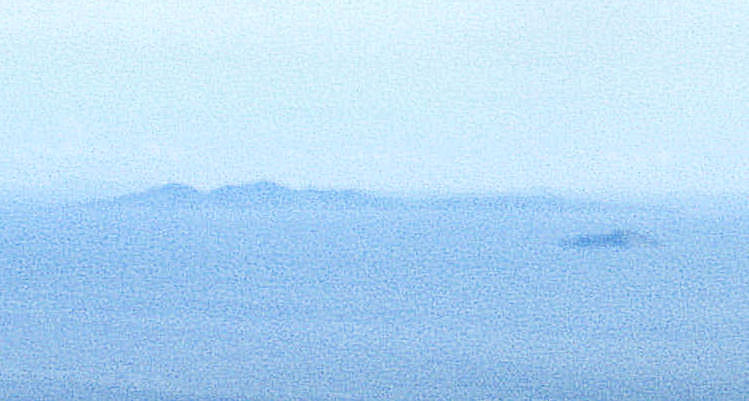
Agutaya island, and small Eke island in the foreground.

Agutaya Island is the second largest of the Cuyo group with an area of about 4.5 square miles (12 km^{2}). The north-eastern part is hilly. Four peaks tower over the island. The middle and highest of the four peaks, 885 feet (270 m) high, is covered with cogon grass (Imperata arundinacea), the others are wooded.

Native sailboats used to be unable to sail to and from the nearby island of Cuyo (only 20 miles away), due to the strength of the monsoon, either the Northwest monsoon in wintertime, or the Southwest monsoon in summer.

=== Volcano ===
Agutaya is an inactive volcano, 120 metres (390 ft) ASL, located at 11°09′N 120°57′E, in the province of Palawan in the Philippines.

Philippine Institute of Volcanology and Seismology (Phivolcs) lists Agutaya as inactive.

=== Barangays ===
Agutaya is politically subdivided into 10 barangays. Each barangay consists of puroks and some have sitios.

- Abagat (Poblacion)
- Algeciras
- Bangcal (Poblacion)
- Cambian (Poblacion)
- Concepcion
- Diit
- Maracañao
- Matarawis
- Villa Fria
- Villa Sol

=== Climate ===
Climate data for Agutaya, Palawan
Month	Jan	Feb	Mar	Apr	May	Jun	Jul	Aug	Sep	Oct	Nov	Dec	Year
Mean daily maximum °C (°F)	29 (84)	30 (86)	30 (86)	31 (88)	31 (88)	30 (86)	29 (84)	29 (84)	29 (84)	29 (84)	29 (84)	29 (84)	30 (85)
Mean daily minimum °C (°F)	23 (73)	23 (73)	23 (73)	24 (75)	25 (77)	25 (77)	24 (75)	24 (75)	24 (75)	24 (75)	24 (75)	24 (75)	24 (75)
Average precipitation mm (inches)	45 (1.8)	34 (1.3)	62 (2.4)	64 (2.5)	127 (5.0)	159 (6.3)	172 (6.8)	147 (5.8)	167 (6.6)	182 (7.2)	172 (6.8)	88 (3.5)	1,419 (56)
Average rainy days	12.1	9.4	13.0	14.3	22.7	26.9	28.0	26.4	27.0	27.0	22.7	17.8	247.3
Source: Meteoblue

== Demographics ==
Population census of Agutaya

Year	Pop.	±% p.a.
1918	3,085	—
1939	3,866	+1.08%
1948	4,846	+2.54%
1960	4,334	−0.93%
1970	4,203	−0.31%
1975	4,397	+0.91%
1980	4,684	+1.27%
1990	6,052	+2.60%

Year	Pop.	±% p.a.
1995	7,250	+3.44%
2000	10,422	+8.09%
2007	10,426	+0.01%
2010	11,906	+4.95%
2015	12,545	+1.00%
2020	12,867	+0.53%
2024	13,351	+0.89%

Source: Philippine Statistics Authority

In the 2024 census, the population of Agutaya was 13,351 people, with a density of 360 inhabitants per square kilometre or 930 inhabitants per square mile.

=== Languages ===
Agutaya is home to a specific language, called the Agutaynen language, spoken by 10,000 people overall. Today, half of its speakers live in Agutaya, while the rest live in other communities of Palawan. Tagalog and Cuyonon are also widely spoken.

== Economy ==
Poverty incidence of Agutaya

Source: Philippine Statistics Authority

== Education ==
The Agutaya Schools District Office governs all educational institutions within the municipality. It oversees the management and operations of all private and public, from primary to secondary schools.

=== Primary and elementary schools ===
- Agutaya Central School
- Algeciras Elementary School
- Concepcion Elementary School
- Diit Elementary School
- Maracañao Elementary School
- Matarawis Elementary School
- Sea and Hills Adventist Refuge School
- Villa Fria Elementary School
- Villa Sol Elementary School

=== Secondary schools ===
- Concepcion National High School
- Gaudencio E. Abordo Mem. National High School

== See also ==
- List of inactive volcanoes in the Philippines
- List of islands of the Philippines
- List of volcanos in the Philippines
- Pacific ring of fire
