= ANSCOR =

Philippine company

A. Soriano Corporation
- Type: Holding company (Public)
- Traded as: (PSE: ANS)
- Industry: Holding company
- Founded: Manila, Philippine Islands (February 13, 1930; 96 years ago) (SEC No.: PW-02)
- Founder: Andrés R. Soriano, Sr.
- Headquarters: Makati, Philippines
- Key people: Andrés L. Soriano III (Chairman and CEO); William H. Ottiger (President, & COO); Andres Miguel Soriano IV (Vice President); Lorna Kapunan (Corporate Secretary)
- Website: www.anscor.com.ph

A. Soriano Corporation (ANSCOR, PSE: ANS) is a holding company in the Philippines with diversified investments. It was incorporated on February 13, 1930 by Andrés Soriano, Sr.

== Current companies ==
Industrial:

- AG&P International Holdings Ltd.
- Phelps Dodge Philippines Energy Products Corporation
- Tayabas Geothermal Power, Inc.

Services:

- Cirrus Global, Inc.
- Element Data
- Island Aviation, Inc.
- Madaket Healthcare
- Pamalican Resort, Inc.
- Prople Limited
- Y-mAbs Therapeutics, Inc.

Property:

- ANSCOR Property Holdings, Inc.
- Seven Seas Resorts and Leisure, Inc. (Amanpulo Resort)
- KSA Realty Corporation (The Enterprise Center)
- Fremont Holdings, Inc.

== Divestments ==
Food and Beverage:

- The Bistro Group
