= Andrés Soriano =

Spanish Filipino businessman (1898–1964)

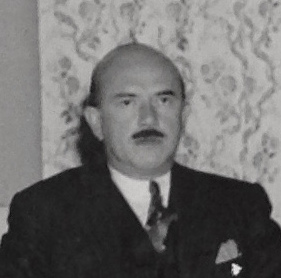

Secretary of Finance, Agriculture, and Commerce
- In office March 26, 1942 – July 31, 1944
- President: Manuel L. Quezon
- Preceded by: Rafael Alunan Sr. (as Secretary of Agriculture and Commerce)
- Succeeded by: Manuel Nieto (as Secretary of Agriculture and Commerce)

Personal details
- Born: Andrés Soriano y Roxas; February 8, 1898 San Miguel, Manila, Captaincy General of the Philippines
- Died: December 30, 1964 (aged 66) Boston, Massachusetts, U.S
- Education: Ateneo de Manila, Stonyhurst College, Escuela Superior de Comercio
- Known for: Founder of Philippine Airlines and Intercontinental Broadcasting Corporation

Andrés Roxas Soriano Sr. (born Andrés Soriano y Roxas; February 8, 1898 – December 30, 1964) was a Spanish Filipino industrialist. Described by The New York Times in 1964 as "one of the most dominant business personalities in the western Pacific area," he was best known for expanding the original San Miguel Brewery evolving into San Miguel Corporation.

He also established philanthropies and encouraged good employee relations by sharing profits with his more than 16,000 employees by establishing a pension plan that paid retired employees 25% of their salary, with guaranteed sick leaves and medical benefits. He was the founder of Philippine Airlines, Asia's first air carrier. In 1935, during Commonwealth era, Soriano established Commonwealth Insurance Company, a non-life insurance company.

== Family and Education ==
Soriano was born on February 8, 1898, in San Miguel, Manila, Philippines. His father, Don Eduardo Soriano Sanz, was a Spanish engineer who migrated to the Philippines in the late 19th century. His mother, Doña Margarita Roxas de Ayala, was the daughter of Pedro Pablo Roxas de Castro, and the granddaughter of Antonio de Ayala and Doña Margarita Róxas de Ayala, progenitors of the prominent Roxas de Ayala and Zóbel de Ayala clans. Soriano was a second cousin of siblings, Col. Jacobo Zóbel (father of Enrique J. Zobel), Alfonso Zóbel de Ayala (father of Jaime Zobel de Ayala), Mercedes Zóbel de McMicking and the artist Fernando Zóbel.

Soriano had three siblings, including sisters, María del Carmen and Margarita.

Soriano was a graduate of Ateneo de Manila and Stonyhurst College in England.

Soriano was married to María del Carmen Montemar in 1924. The couple had two sons, José María Montemar Soriano (born on February 6, 1925) and Andrés Soriano Jr.

== Career ==
=== San Miguel Corporation ===
In 1918, Soriano joined the original San Miguel Brewery as an assistant accountant. In six months, he became acting manager. By 1924, he was its general manager, and in 1931, at the age of 33 he was elected as its president.

During his incumbency, the San Miguel expanded beyond brewery and began to bottle Royal Tru-Orange and Coca-Cola, manufacture Magnolia Ice Cream and dairy products, carbonic acid, dry ice and Fleischmann's Yeast.

During his presidency, Soriano was known for being authoritative and paternalistic in managing the company. His employees described his leadership as known for having "his word was law", and that includes deciding the "flavor of the month" in Magnolia Ice Cream, one of the company's products. He was also actively involved in rebuilding San Miguel after the war and its further expansion with the acquisition of the Balintawak Beer Brewery in Polo, Bulacan.

=== A. Soriano Corporation (ANSCOR) ===
In the 1930s, Soriano established A. Soriano Corporation (ANSCOR) as a holding company for his investments outside of San Miguel. Initially, ANSCOR concentrated on natural resources and basic industries, investing in Atlas Consolidated Mining and Development Corporation, Phelps Dodge Philippines and Atlas Fertilizer Corporation. ANSCOR also went into insurance; gold mining (Antamok Mining, which together with the companies of John Hausserman and Jan Hendrik Marsman, made the Philippines second only to California as the top gold producer of the world); oil exploration (Philippine Oil Development Company, Inc.); airline (Philippine Airlines); copper mining (Atlas Consolidated); copper wire manufacture (Phelps Dodge Philippines); fertilizer from pyrite (Atlas Fertilizer); logging and lumber (Bislig Bay Lumber); paper manufacture (Paper Industries Corporation of the Philippines (PICOP)); fluorescent lamps and incandescent light bulbs (Philippine Electrical Manufacturing Company (PEMCO)); jute bags (Industrial Textiles Manufacturing Company of the Philippines, Inc. (ITEMCOP)); steel drums (Rheem Philippines); newspapers (The Philippines Herald) and broadcasting (DZTV Channel 13). Atlas Consolidated grew to be the largest copper mine of its time in the Far East and one of the ten largest copper mines in the world.

== Citizenship ==
He was a Spanish citizen and leader of the Philippine Falange during the late 1930s until he applied for Filipino citizenship.

After becoming a Filipino citizen, Soriano served as secretary of finance, agriculture and commerce during the wartime cabinet of the Quezon administration. Soriano also served with USAFFE and later as a colonel on General Douglas MacArthur's staff in the Southwest Pacific Theater.

He was granted American citizenship for his wartime services and remained an American citizen until his death.

== Death ==
Soriano died on December 30, 1964, at Massachusetts General Hospital in Boston, Massachusetts.

== See also ==
- De La Salle Andres Soriano Memorial College
- Andres Soriano Colleges of Bislig
