= Amanpulo =

Island resort in Palawan, Philippines

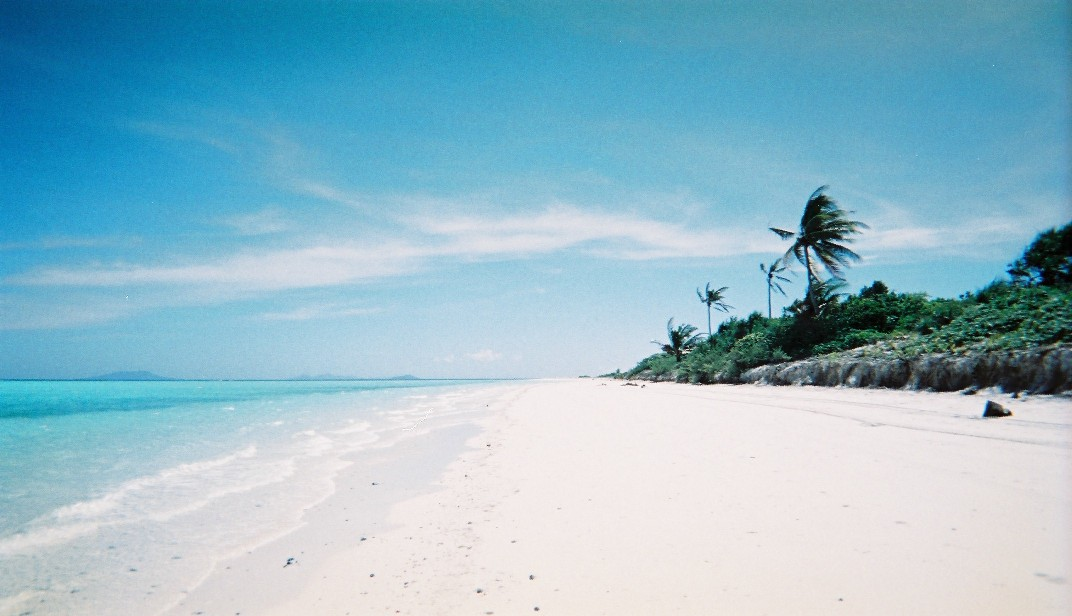
- Main beach of the resort to the south of the island

General information
- Location: Pamalican Island, Cuyo, Palawan
- Coordinates: 11.3529141°N 120.7312909°E
- Opening: December 1993; 32 years ago
- Owner: Aman Resorts
- Operator: ANSCOR

Design and construction
- Architect: Francisco Mañosa

Other information
- Number of rooms: 42 (including 29 beachside, 4 treetop and 2 Deluxe hillside casitas)
- Number of suites: 18 private villas (including 7 four-bedroom Lagoon Villas and 5 four-bedroom Palawan Villas)

Website
- Amanpulo Official Website

Amanpulo is an ultra-luxury private island resort located on Pamalican Island in Palawan, Philippines. A collaboration between Aman Resorts and the A. Soriano Corporation (ANSCOR), the resort is operated under Seven Seas Resorts and Leisure, Inc. and opened in 1993.

The name Amanpulo combines the Sanskrit word aman (peace) with the Tagalog word pulo (island), meaning **"peaceful island"**. It reflects both the tranquil nature of the setting and Aman Resorts' signature philosophy of seclusion and serenity.

== History ==
Pamalican Island Story prior to the 1980s. Was owned by one of the oldest families in Cuyo Palawan with Last Name "Rey" before being purchased by the Sorianos and renaming to Amanpulo.

Amanpulo’s story began in the early 1980s, when the Soriano family came across Pamalican Island while sailing in the Sulu Sea during a typhoon. The island, which was not marked on most navigational charts, captivated them with its ring of powdery white sand and untouched environment.

Wishing to preserve its natural beauty while opening it to discreet luxury tourism, the Sorianos invited Adrian Zecha, founder of Aman Resorts, to partner in developing the island. During an aerial survey, Zecha famously sketched the resort's early layout from a helicopter. Their collaboration was confirmed with a handshake in the air.

Renowned Filipino architect Francisco Mañosa, known for his work celebrating vernacular Filipino architecture, was brought in to design the resort. Inspired by the traditional bahay kubo (nipa hut), Mañosa designed open-air casitas using natural materials and forms that blended seamlessly with the environment.

The resort opened in 1993 as Aman Resorts’ first property in the Philippines. It is still majority-owned by ANSCOR, in line with the Constitution of the Philippines, which restricts full foreign ownership of land-based businesses.

== Location and Access ==
Amanpulo is situated on Pamalican Island, a 5.5 km-long private island in the Cuyo Archipelago in Palawan. Surrounded by coral reefs and the turquoise waters of the Sulu Sea, the island remains completely dedicated to the resort.

Guests reach the island via a 70-minute private flight from Ninoy Aquino International Airport in Manila, arranged exclusively by Amanpulo. The resort operates its own lounge, aircraft, and landing strip.

== Architecture and Design ==
Amanpulo’s design was guided by Francisco Mañosa, who emphasized the use of Filipino tropical vernacular. The resort’s 42 casitas are modeled after the *bahay kubo*, built with wood, thatch, and large open-air spaces. The architecture allows for natural cooling, ocean views, and harmony with the island’s vegetation.

== Accommodations ==
The resort features:

- 42 Casitas – freestanding luxury suites categorized into Beach, Treetop, Hillside, and Deluxe Hillside Casitas. Each comes with a private buggy, sundeck, and access to nature or the beach.
- 18 Villas – ranging from one to four bedrooms, each villa includes a private swimming pool, dedicated staff (chef and butler), full kitchens, and expansive outdoor living areas, ideal for families or groups seeking complete privacy.

Each villa features a private swimming pool and offers separate bedroom, living and dining pavilions, an outdoor lounge and a kitchen. One-, two- and four-bedroom villas are available. All villas come with a cook and housekeeper, and a number enjoy beautiful garden settings.

== Facilities and Activities ==
Amanpulo offers a range of high-end services and experiences:

=== Aman Spa ===
Located on a hilltop with sea views, it features treatment pavilions, steam rooms, and wellness programs including yoga and meditation.

=== Dining ===
Multiple venues include:

 * The Clubhouse Restaurant (Filipino and international fare)
 * The Beach Club (Mediterranean)
 * The Lagoon Club (Asian and seafood)
 * Special experiences like sandbank picnics and in-villa barbecues

=== Recreation ===
 * A Dive Centre offering PADI certifications and coral reef dives
 * Non-motorized water sports: paddleboarding, sailing, windsurfing, snorkeling
 * Fitness pavilion, tennis courts, jungle trails, and bicycles

=== Boutique & Library ===
Offering local crafts, books, and curated Aman merchandise

== Sustainability ==
Amanpulo prioritizes eco-conscious operations. Key initiatives include:

- Solar-powered desalination for fresh water
- Coral reef protection and marine biodiversity monitoring
- Waste reduction and plastic-free operations
- Sustainable sourcing through the on-site organic farm
- Community outreach via the Andres Soriano Foundation, supporting healthcare, education, and livelihoods for neighboring island communities

== Recognition ==
Amanpulo is internationally regarded as one of the most luxurious and secluded resorts in the world. It has received numerous accolades:

- Condé Nast Traveler – Readers' Choice Awards, Gold List
- Travel + Leisure – World’s Best Island Resorts
- Forbes Travel Guide – Five-Star Rating
- Tatler Travel Guide – Best Private Island Retreat

The resort is also favored by global celebrities, royals, and dignitaries for its privacy and personalized service. Bill Gates as well as his wife Melinda Gates stayed here during their visit in the country in 2015, of which the primary reason was to inspect and be personally briefed about Gates Foundation-funded projects at the International Rice Research Institute.

== Controversy ==
See also: Flood control projects scandal in the Philippines

On January 29, 2026, Filipino investigative journalist Natashya Gutierrez reported that "a multi-million dollar, four-bedroom villa ("Number 20") that sprawls over an acre surrounding an infinity pool has ties to former House Speaker Martin Romualdez."
