= Cuyo Archipelago =

Group of islands in the Philippines

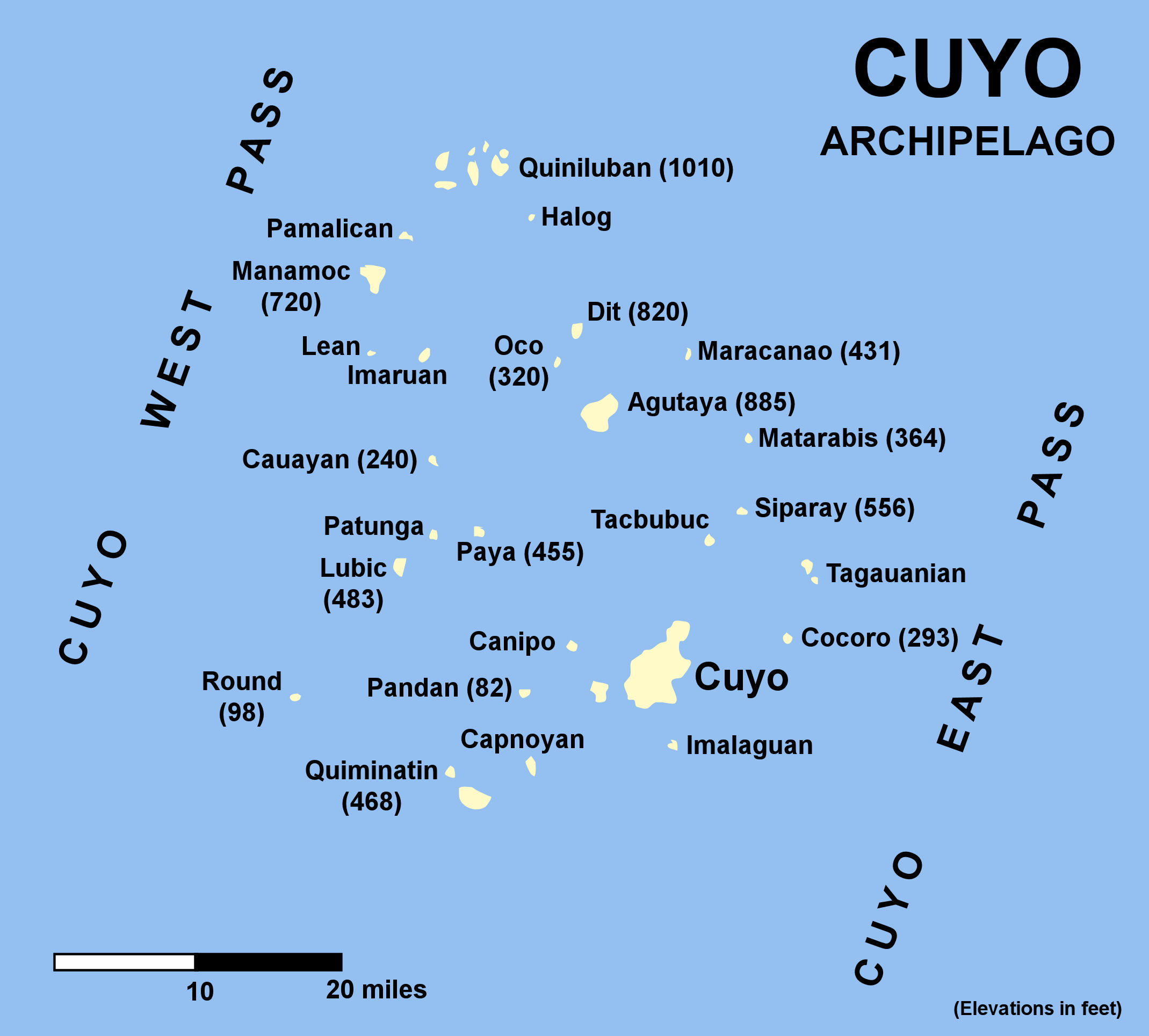

- Location within Philippines

Geography
- Location: Sulu Sea
- Coordinates: 10°51′N 121°01′E
- Total islands: 45
- Major islands: Agutaya; Cuyo; Magsaysay
- Area: 50 sq mi (130 km^{2})
- Highest elevation: 251 m (823 ft)
- Highest point: Mount Bonbon

Administration
- Philippines
- Region: Mimaropa
- Province: Palawan
- Municipality: Agutaya; Cuyo; Magsaysay

Demographics
- Demonym: Cuyonon
- Population: 48,959 (2020)

The Cuyo Archipelago or Cuyo Islands, is a group of about 45 islands lying to the northeast of the Philippine island of Palawan. It lies south of Mindoro and between Northern Palawan and Panay. It is centered on the largest island of the archipelago, Cuyo Island, with an area of 22 square miles (57 km^{2}) and is about 9 miles (14 km) long.

The 45 islands and islets of the archipelago form a total land area of 50 square miles (130 km^{2}). Cuyo is divided into two island groups. To the north is the Quiniluban group. To the south is the Cuyo group, where the centers of the three municipalities namely Cuyo, Agutaya, and Magsaysay are located.

Geologically, the islands are related to the main island of Palawan. They are positioned on the western edge of the Luzon Arc. Cuyo island is volcanic. The northern islands of Quiniluban seem to be uplifted coral atolls, although the heights of some of the peaks strongly suggest volcanic uplift. There have been plans before to establish the Cuyo Archipelago as a separate province from Palawan, just like what happened when Batanes became independent from Cagayan province. Many other islands of the group are purely corallian.

Cuyo is divided in three municipalities, namely Cuyo, Agutaya, and Magsaysay:

- Cuyo, Palawan (southern and western part)
- Magsaysay, Palawan (eastern part)
- Agutaya, Palawan (northern part)

Altogether, 45,718 people inhabit the Cuyo group of islands.

Some of the main islands, or island groups, are:

- Quiniluban
- Pamalican
- Manamoc
- Agutaya
- Cuyo

== Islands ==
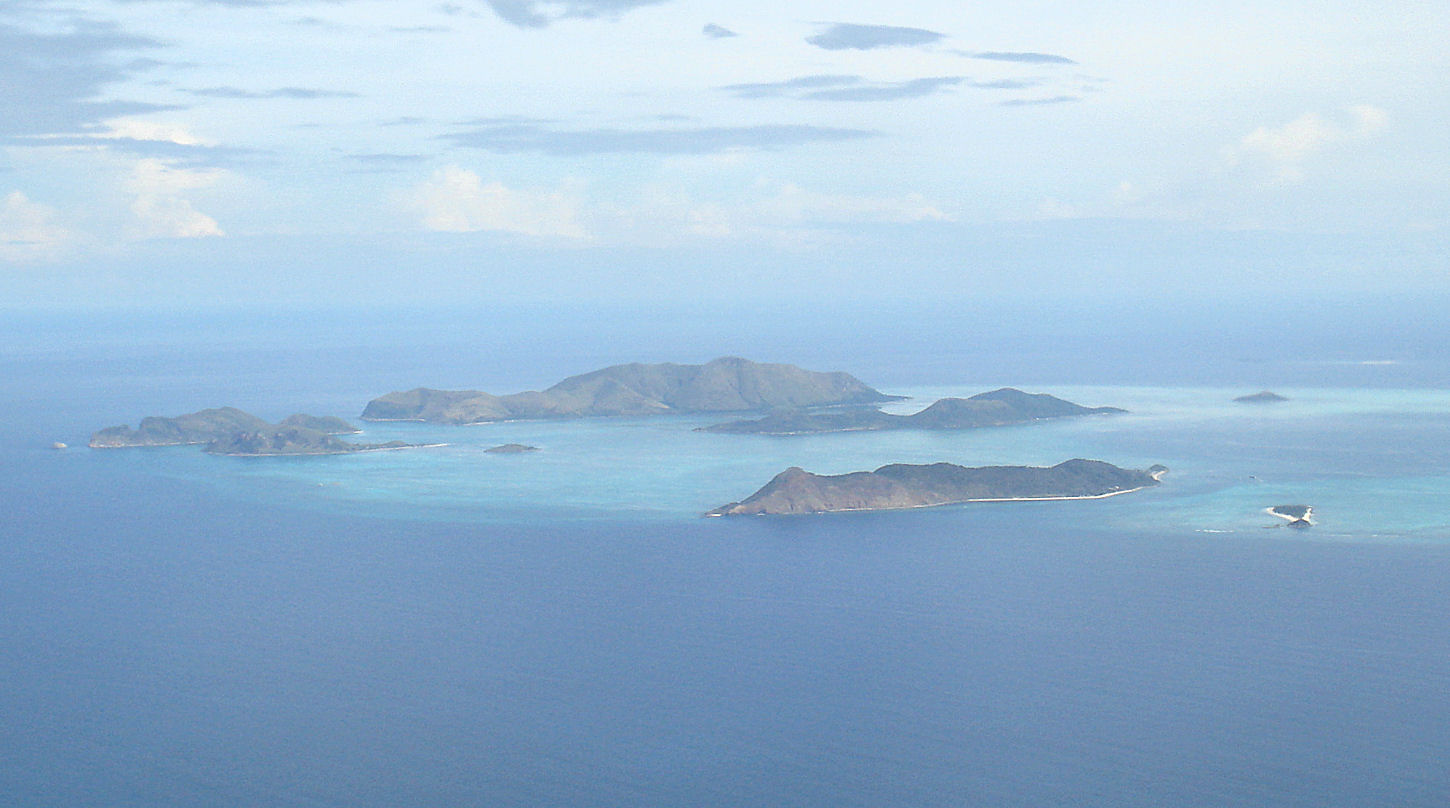
Quiniluban group, northern part of the Cuyo archipelago.

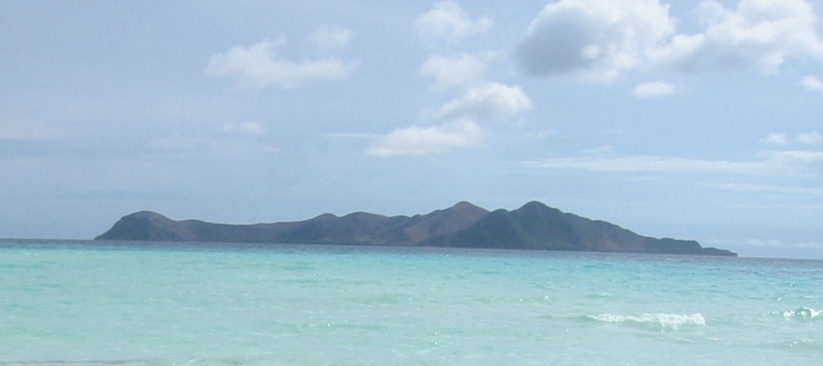
Manamoc island is located in the northwestern part of the Cuyo archipelago.

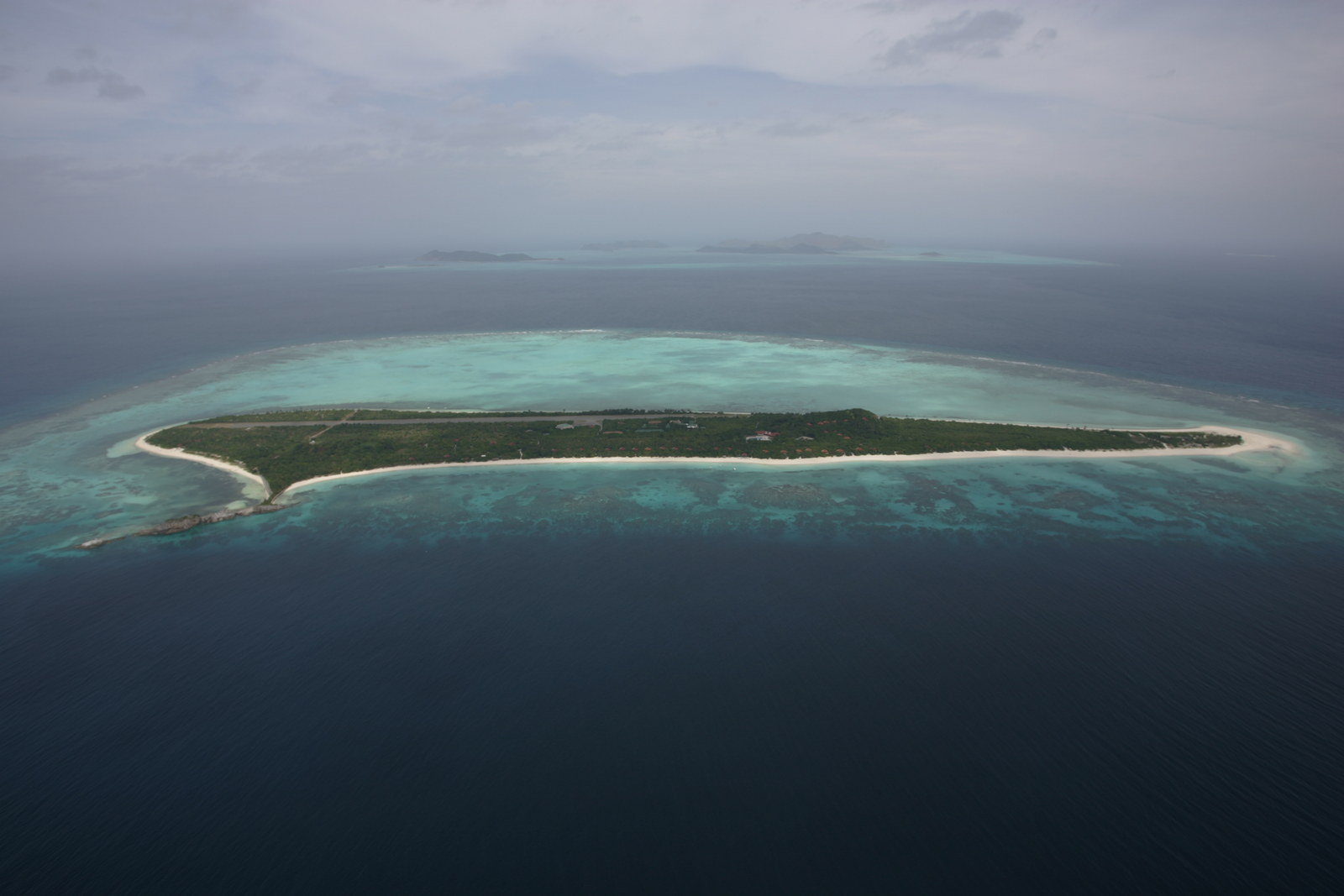
Pamalican island.

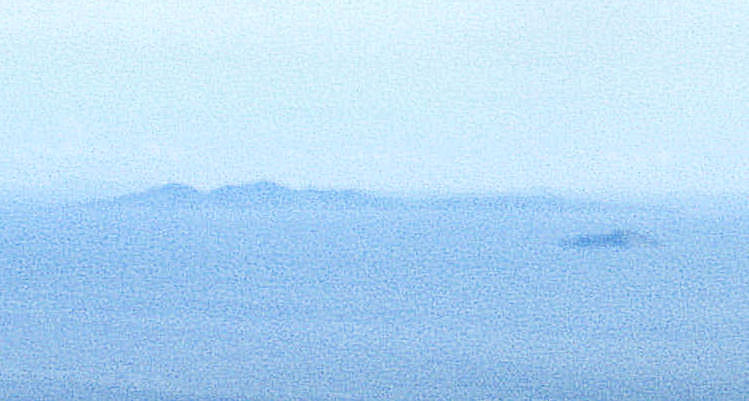
Agutaya island, and small Oco island in the forefront.
