= Quezon City =

Highly urbanized city in Metro Manila, Philippines

Quezon City Lungsod Quezon (Filipino)
- Highly urbanized city
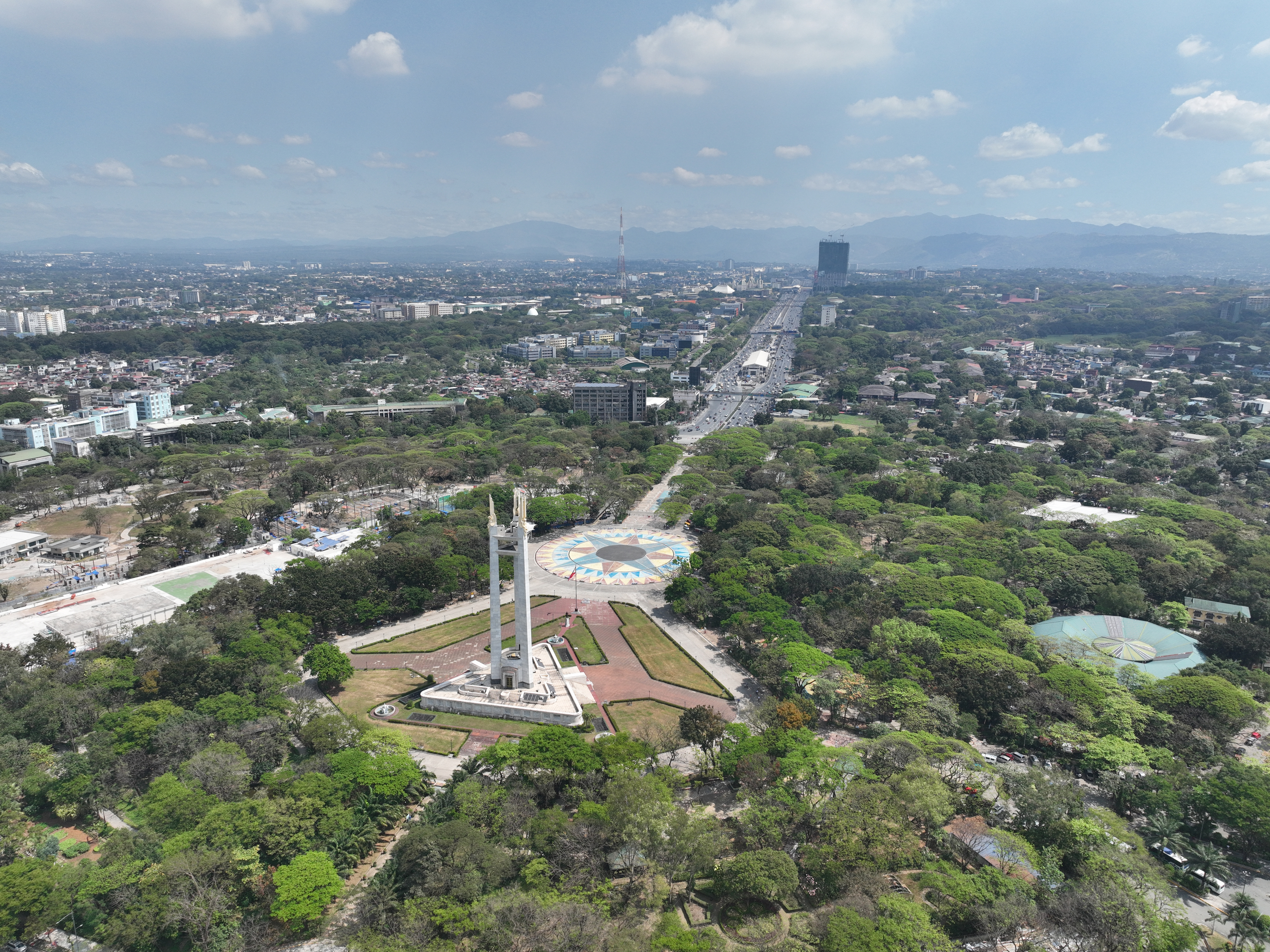
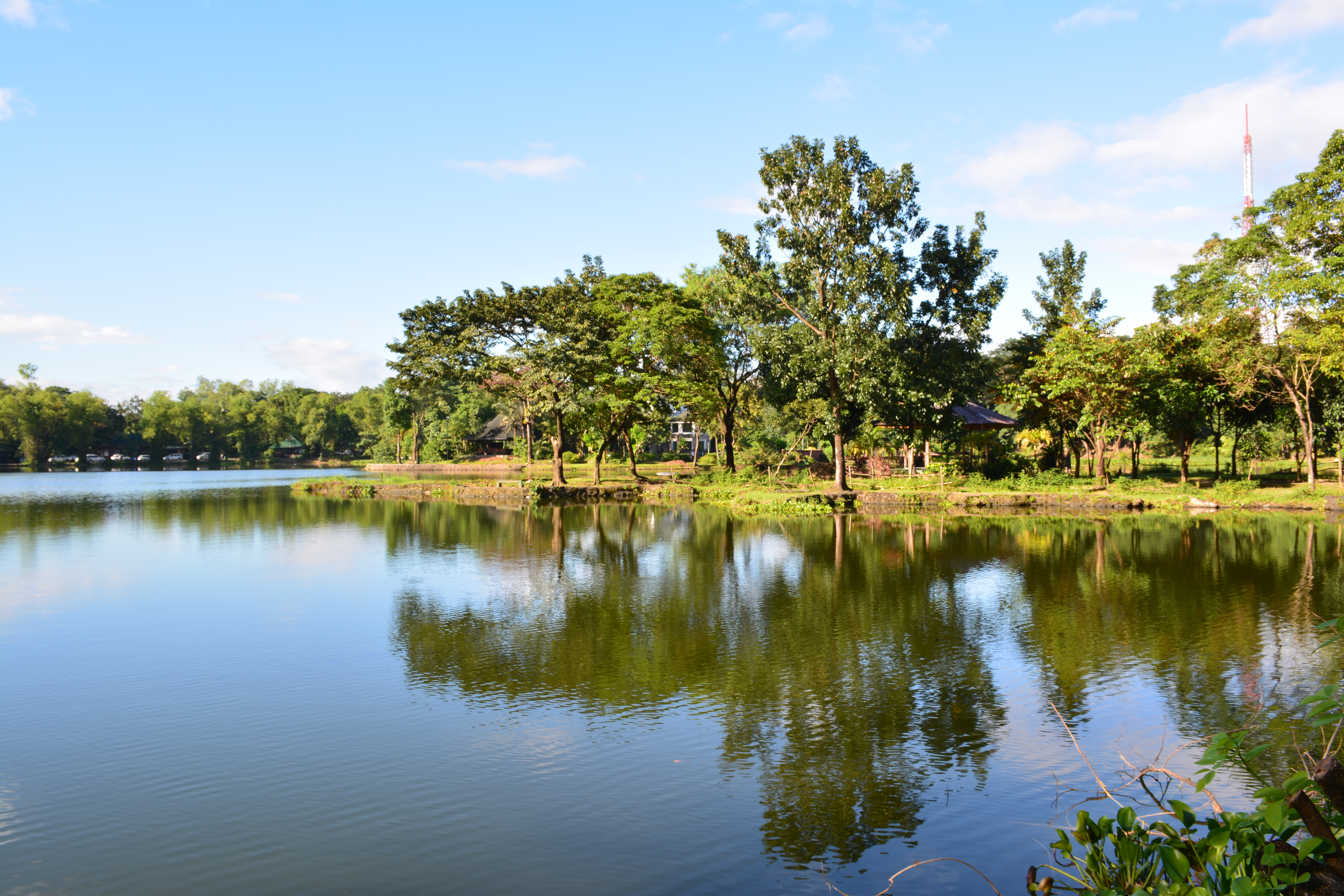
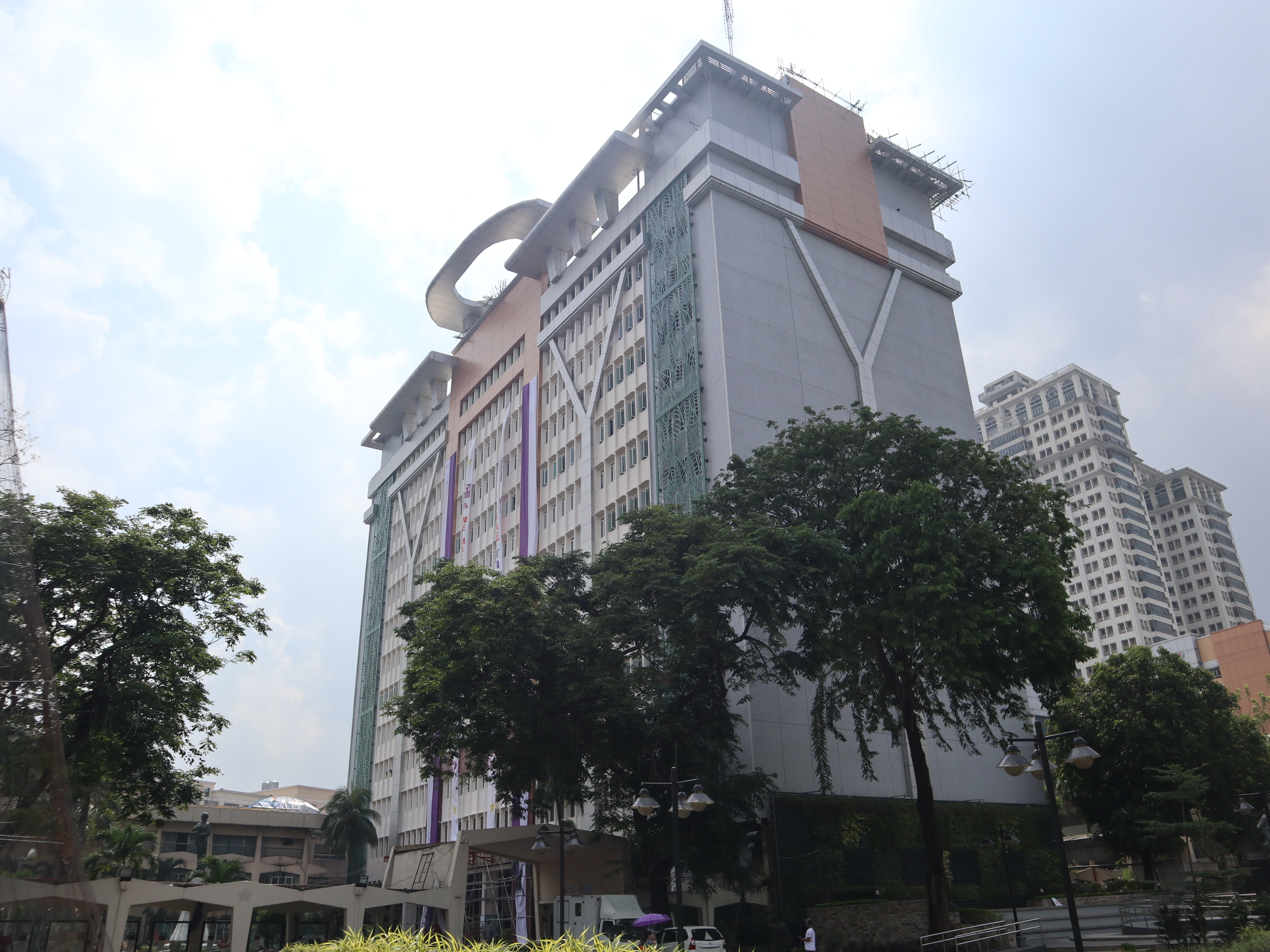
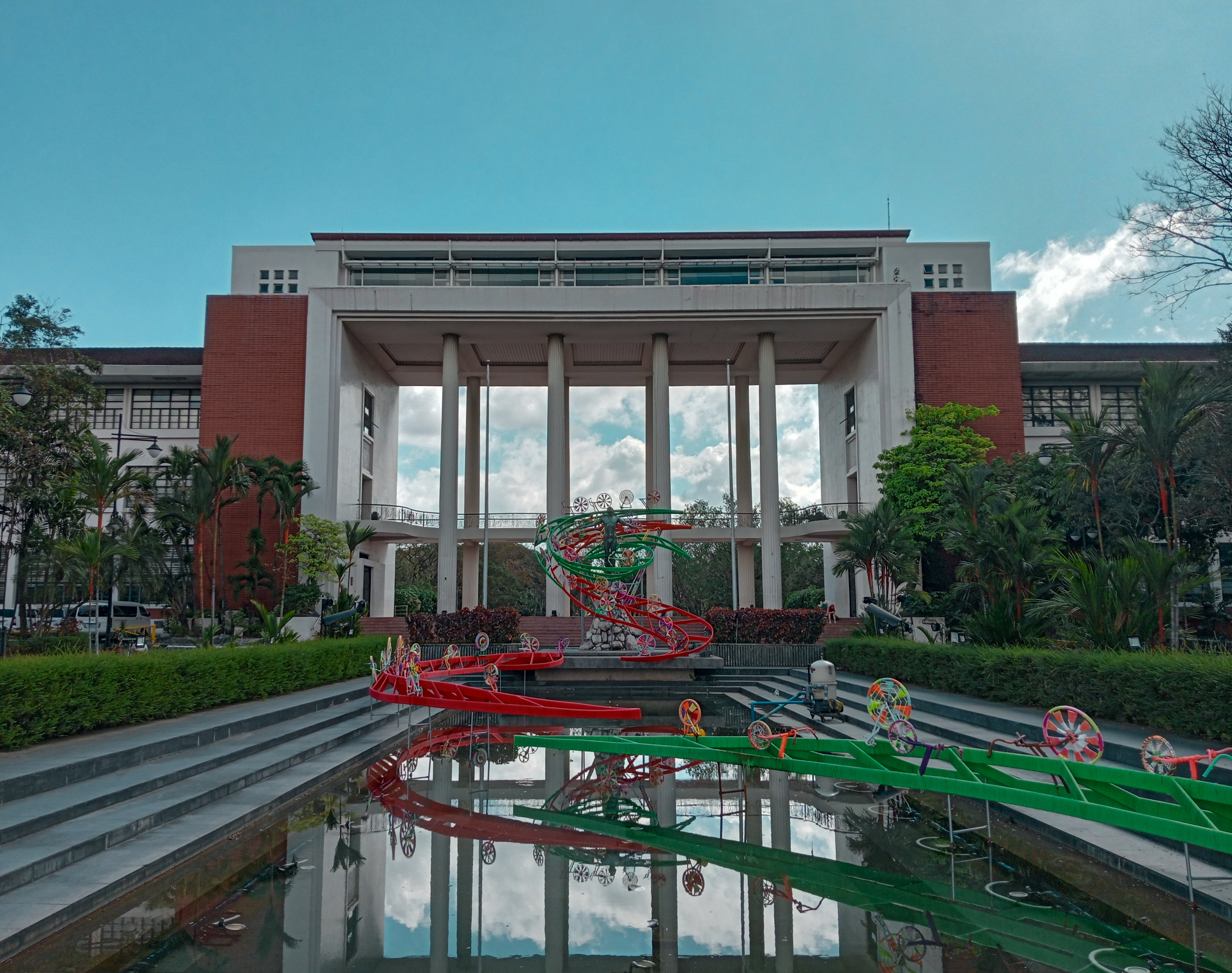
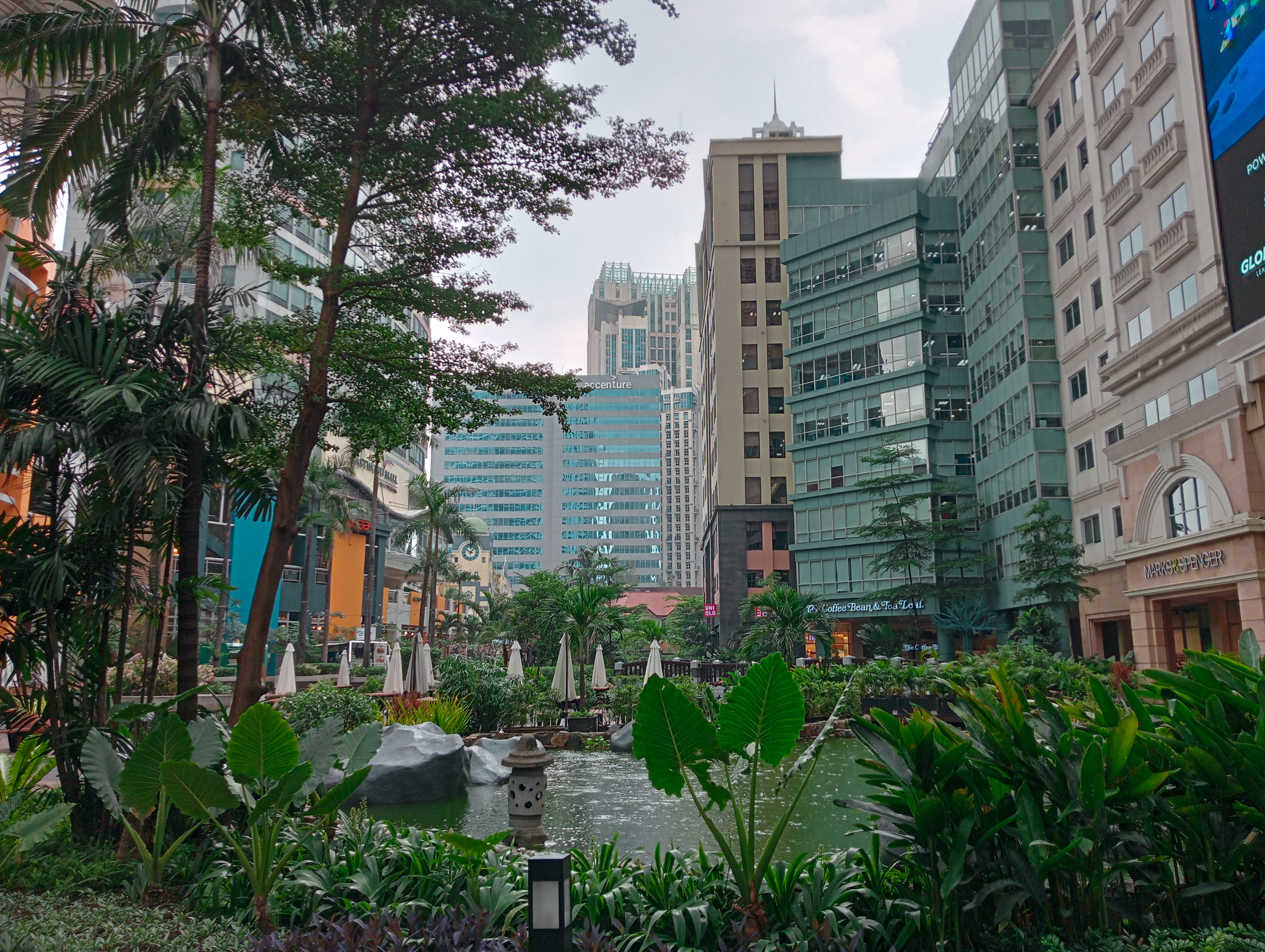
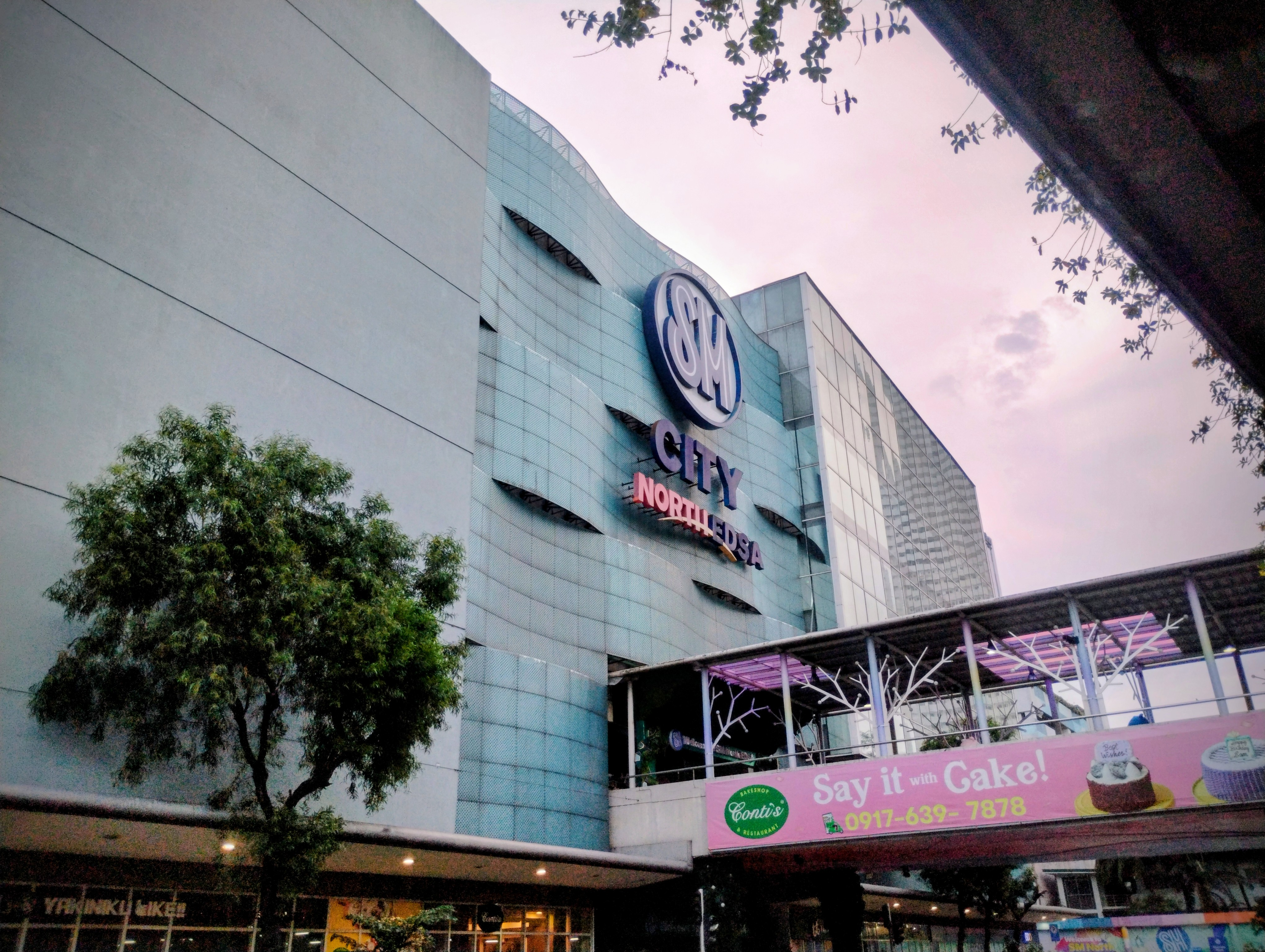
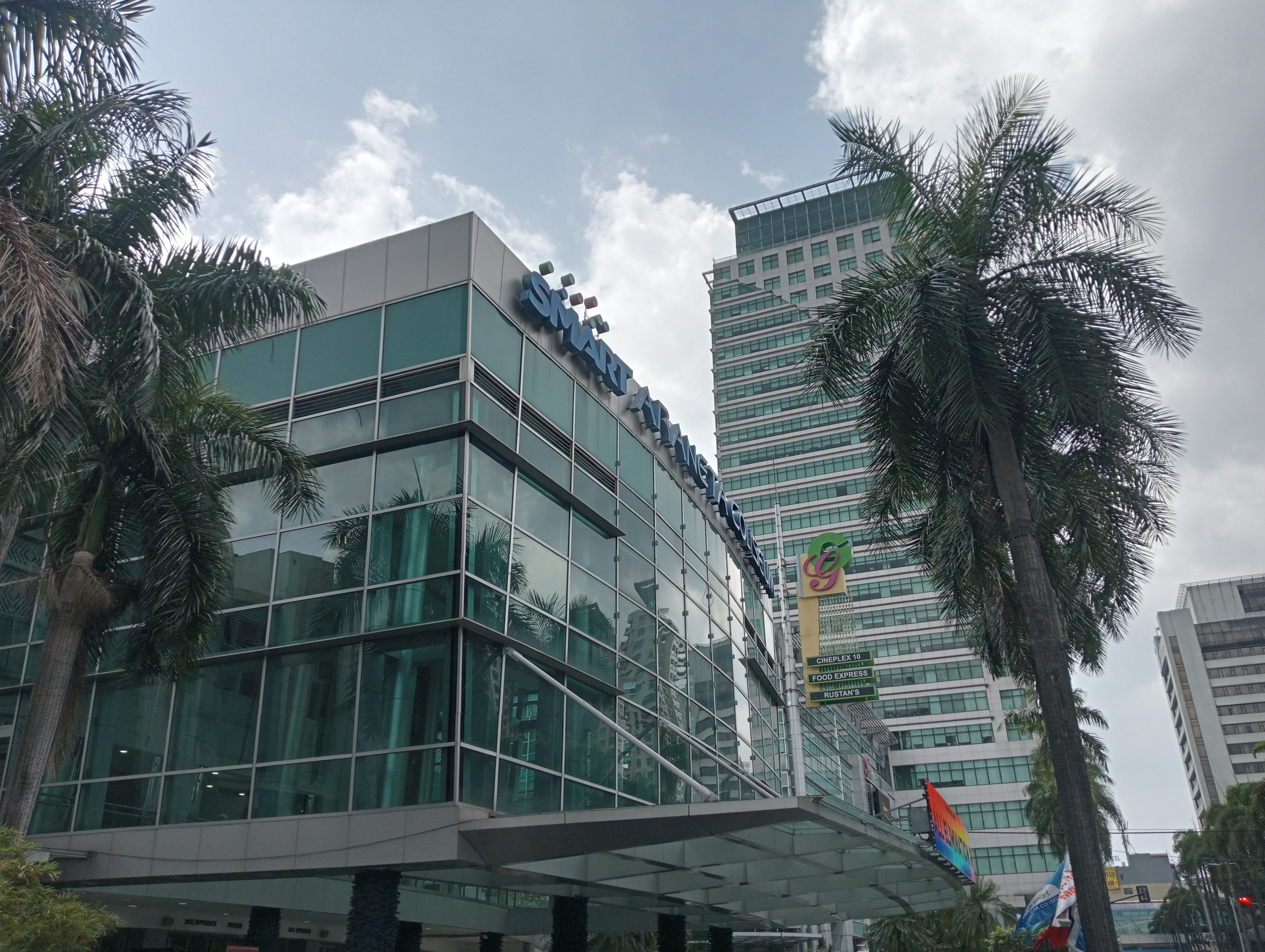
- Quezon Memorial Shrine and the Commonwealth Avenue Ninoy Aquino Parks and Wildlife Center Quezon City Hall University of the Philippines Diliman Eastwood City SM North EDSA Araneta Coliseum

- Flag Seal
- Nickname: City of Stars
- Anthem: Awit ng Lungsod Quezon ("Song of Quezon City")
- Map of Metro Manila with Quezon City highlighted
- Interactive map of Quezon City
- Location within the Philippines Quezon City (Asia)
- Coordinates: 14°39′00″N 121°02′51″E
- Country: Philippines
- Region: Metro Manila
- Districts: 1st to 6th districts
- Incorporated (city): October 12, 1939
- Highly urbanized city (independent city): December 22, 1979
- Named for: Manuel L. Quezon
- Barangays: 142 (see Barangays)

Government
  - Type: Sangguniang Panlungsod
  - Mayor: Maria Josefina “Joy” G. Belmonte (SBP)
  - Vice Mayor: Gian Carlo G. Sotto (SBP)
  - Representatives: List: 1st LegDist; Arjo Atayde; 2nd LegDist; Ralph Wendel Tulfo; 3rd LegDist; Franz Pumaren; 4th LegDist; Bong Suntay; 5th LegDist; Patrick Michael Vargas; 6th LegDist; Marivic Co-Pilar
  - Council: Councilors: 1st District; • Alex Bernard R. Cruz-Herrera; • Joseph Emile Juico; • Dorothy "Doray" A. Delarmente; • Tany Joe "TJ" L. Calalay; • Nicole Ella "Nikki" V. Crisologo; • Charm Ferrer; 2nd District; • Aly Medalla; • Dave Valmocina; • Eden Delilah "Candy" Medina-Atienza; • Rannie Ludovica; • Fernando Miguel "Mikey" F. Belmonte; • Godie Liban; 3rd District; • Kate Abigael "Kate" G. Coseteng; • Geleen Lumbad; • Chuckie Antonio; • Wencerom Benedict "Wency" C. Lagumbay; • Don De Leon; • Anton Reyes; 4th District; • Maria Imelda "Imee" A. Rillo; • Ma. Aurora "Marra" C. Suntay; • Irene R. Belmonte; • Restituto "Resty" B. Malañgen; • Ivy Xenia "Ivy" L. Lagman; • Hero Clarence "Hero" M. Bautista; 5th District; • Jose "Joe" A. Visaya; • Katrina Mutya Castelo; • Patrick Michael "PM" D. Vargas; • Shaira "Shay" L. Liban; • Ramon Vicente "Ram" V. Medalla; • Mary Aiko S. Melendez; 6th District; • Eric Z. Medina; • Ellie Juan; • Kristine Alexia Matias; • Banjo Pilar; • Vito Sotto Generoso; • Victor Bernardo; ABC President; Ricardo Corpuz
  - Electorate: 1,454,411 voters (2025)

Area
  - Total: 171.71 km^{2} (66.30 sq mi)
- Elevation: 67 m (220 ft)
- Highest elevation: 796 m (2,612 ft)
- Lowest elevation: −2 m (−6.6 ft)

Population (2024 census)
  - Total: 3,084,270
  - Rank: 1st
  - Density: 17,962/km^{2} (46,522/sq mi)
  - Households: 738,724
- Demonym(s): Taga-QC; QCitizen

Economy
  - Income class: 1st city income class
  - Poverty incidence: 0.7% (2023)
  - Revenue: ₱ 35,091 million (2025)
  - Assets: ₱ 495,683 million (2025)
  - Expenditure: ₱ 32,464 million (2025)
  - Liabilities: ₱ 28,804 million (2025)

Service provider
  - Electricity: Manila Electric Company (Meralco)
- Time zone: UTC+8 (PST)
- ZIP code: 1100 to 1138
- PSGC: 1381300000
- IDD : area code: +63 (0)2
- Native languages: Tagalog (Filipino)
- Major religions: Catholic
- Catholic dioceses: Roman Catholic Archdiocese of Manila (EDSA Shrine); Roman Catholic Diocese of Cubao (Districts 1, 3, 4, and 6 (except Barangay Camp Aguinaldo, Matandang Balara, EDSA Shrine, and southern part of Bagong Lipunan ng Crame); Roman Catholic Diocese of Novaliches (Districts 2, 3 (Barangay Matandang Balara), 5, and 6 (northern Culiat, northern Tandang Sora, Pasong Tamo, Sauyo, and Talipapa)
- Patron saint: Our Lady of La Naval de Manila
- Website: quezoncity.gov.ph

Quezon City (UK: /ˈkeɪzɒn/, US: /ˈkeɪsɒn/; Filipino: Lungsod Quezon [luŋˈsod ˈkɛson]), also known as the City of Quezon and Q.C. (read and pronounced in Filipino as Kyusi), is the most populous city in the Philippines. According to the 2024 census, it has a population of 3,084,270 people. It was founded on October 12, 1939, and was named after Manuel L. Quezon, the second president of the Philippines. Quezon City served as the capital of the Philippines from 1948 until 1976, when the designation was returned to Manila.

The city was intended to be the national capital of the Philippines that would replace Manila, as the latter was suffering from overcrowding, lack of housing, poor sanitation, and traffic congestion. To create Quezon City, several barrios were carved out from the towns of Caloocan, Marikina, San Juan and Pasig, in addition to the eight vast estates the Philippine government purchased for this purpose. It was officially proclaimed the national capital on October 12, 1949, and several government departments and institutions moved out of Manila and settled into the new capital city. This necessitated the expansion of the city northward, carving out Novaliches from Caloocan, which divided it into two non-contiguous parts. Several barrios were also taken from San Mateo and parts of Montalban. However, on June 24, 1976, Presidential Decree No. 940 was enacted, which reverted national capital status to Manila while the whole of Metro Manila was designated as the seat of government. The city was also chosen as the regional center of Southern Tagalog, which was created in 1965, along with the provinces of Quezon and Aurora, the birthplace of Manuel L. Quezon; however, its status of regional center became ineffective when the region was divided into Calabarzon and Mimaropa, through the effect of Executive Order No. 103 in May 2002 under the presidency of Gloria Macapagal Arroyo, and Aurora was transferred to the authority of Central Luzon, with Southern Tagalog limited to being a cultural-geographic region.

Quezon City is known for its culture, entertainment industry, and media, and is aptly called the "City of Stars". Major broadcasting networks have their headquarters and studios in the city. It is also known for its commerce, education, research, technology, politics, tourism, art, and sports. Several national government branches including the Batasang Pambansa Complex, the seat of House of Representatives of the Philippines, call the city home. As the home of major government institutions, universities, and national media networks, Quezon City has played a central role in the political, educational, and civic development of the modern Philippines.

Quezon City is a planned city. It covers a total area of 161.11 square kilometers (62.20 sq mi), making it the largest city in Metro Manila/NCR in terms of land area. It is politically subdivided into six congressional districts, which represent the city in the Lower House of the Congress of the Philippines. The city has 142 barangays under the City Government. National government departments and agencies are mostly situated in the first National Government Center (NGC) in Diliman and the second National Government Center in Batasan Hills, where the Lower House of the Philippine Congress is located. Most of the city's northern part lies at the foothills of the Sierra Madre mountain range, including the La Mesa Watershed Reservation, the largest watershed in Metro Manila and a designated protected area.

According to its 2023 estimated census, Quezon City had 3.1 million people in its boundaries, and ₱1.27 trillion (US$93.8 billion) in its gross domestic product (GDP), and it is the only planned city in the National Capital Region of the Philippines.

== History ==
=== Commonwealth era ===
==== Initial plans for a new capital city ====
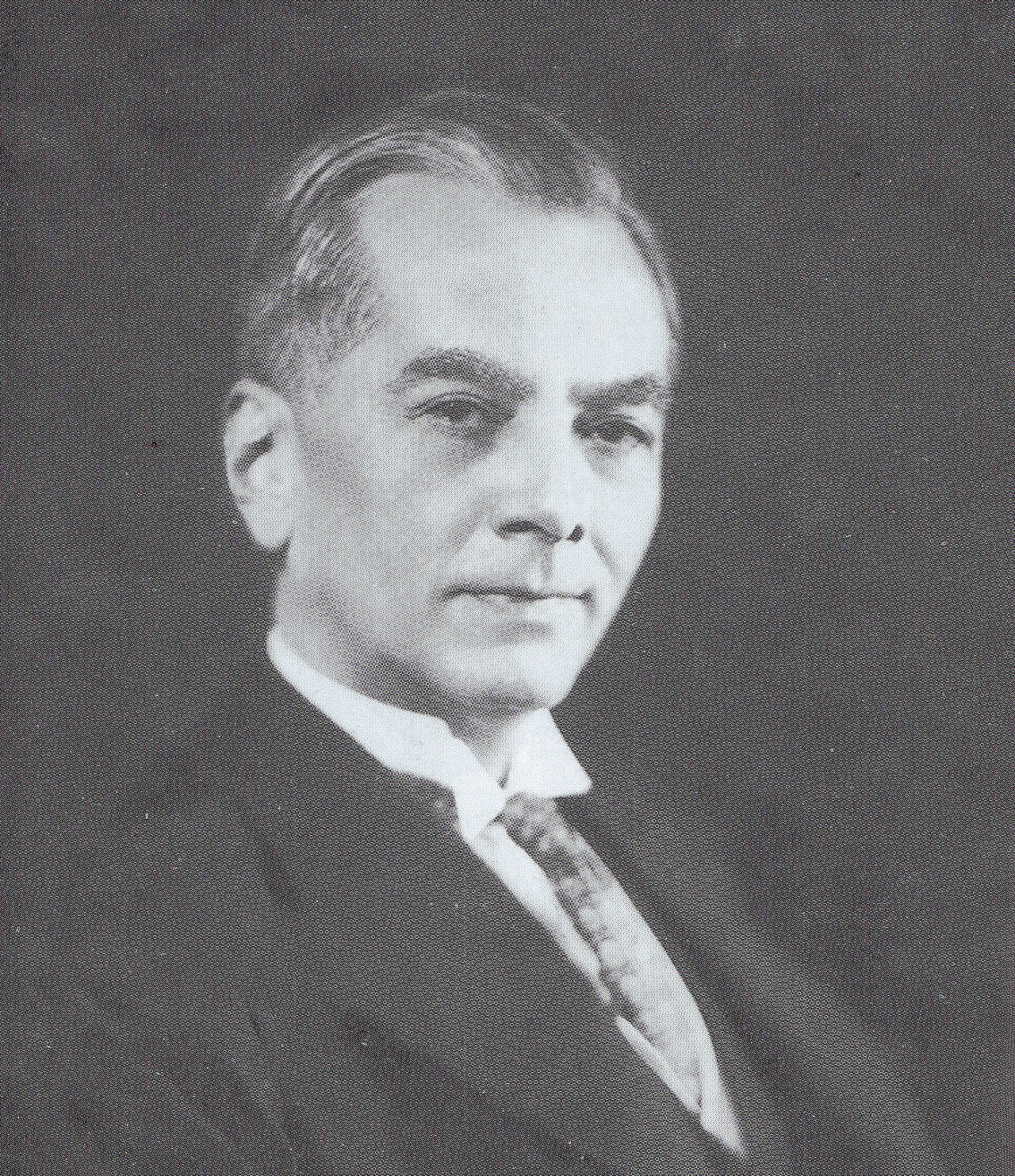
Manuel L. Quezon, the second president of the Philippines and the visionary behind the creation of Quezon City, is the namesake of the city.

Before the creation of Quezon City, the land on where it would eventually rise was part of several towns such as Caloocan, Mariquina (Marikina), Montalban (renamed as Rodriguez), Pasig, San Mateo, and San Juan del Monte (renamed as San Juan), all under Manila province and, beginning in 1901, Rizal province.

In the 1930s, Manila's urban problems were apparent and problematic. It lacked public housing, where thousands of the city's residents lived in congested informal settler communities, especially in the central districts of Binondo, Intramuros, Quiapo, San Nicolas and Tondo. There were also problems with sanitation and traffic congestion. The rise of slums in Manila gave rise to the development of its suburbs outside the city limits in the municipalities of Pasay, San Felipe Neri (renamed as Mandaluyong), San Francisco del Monte, Makati, and San Juan del Monte. These towns became favorable to the upper and middle-class who wanted to escape the congested city but had economic links to it.

President Manuel L. Quezon, aware of the problems besetting Manila, initiated housing projects called Barrio Obrero (Worker's Community). These communities were established in various places in Manila such as Avenida Rizal, Sta. Cruz and Barrio Vitas, Tondo. However, the project failed miserably and these communities became slum areas.

Alejandro Roces Sr., a prominent Filipino author, was said to be influential in Quezon's vision to establish a new city. Quezon dreamed of a city where the common people could live and thrive. Roces suggested that a sizeable tract of land be purchased for this purpose. However, the government had no available fund except for ₱3 million in the hands of the National Development Company (NDC).

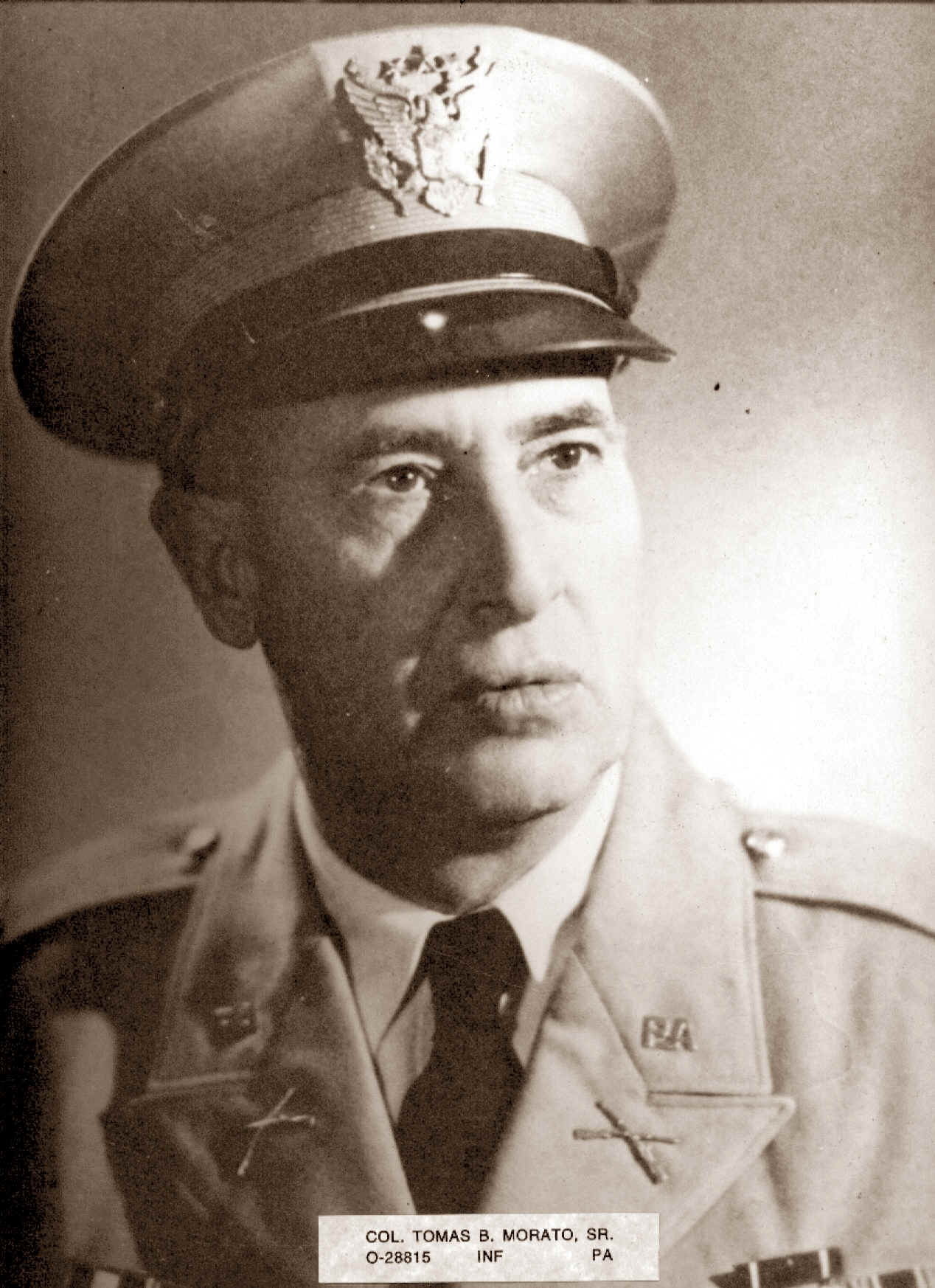
Tomas Morato, the first Mayor of Quezon city

In order to make Quezon's dream a reality and to mobilize funds for the land purchase, the People's Homesite Corporation (PHC) was created on October 14, 1938, as a subsidiary of NDC, with an initial capital of ₱2 million. Roces was the chairman of the Board of PHC, and they immediately acquired the vast Diliman Estate of the Tuason family at a cost of 5 centavos per square meter. PHC conducted topographical and subdivision surveys, and then subdivided the lots and sold them to the target buyers at an affordable price. Its target users and beneficiaries were Manila's working class, who were suffering from a shortage of affordable and decent housing in the capital. The service of the Metropolitan Waterworks system was extended to site. The Bureau of Public Works, then under Secretary Vicente Fragante, constructed the streets and highways within the property. Quezon also tapped Architect Juan M. Arellano to draft a design of the city. Eight vast estates were acquired in order to create Quezon City: Diliman Estate, 1,573.22 hectares (15.7322 km^{2}), Santa Mesa Estate, 861.79 hectares (8.6179 km^{2}), Mandaluyong Estate, 781.36 hectares (7.8136 km^{2}), Magdalena Estate, 764.48 hectares (7.6448 km^{2}), Piedad Estate, 743.84 hectares (7.4384 km^{2}), Maysilo Estate, 266.73 hectares (2.6673 km^{2}) and the San Francisco Del Monte Estate, 257.54 hectares (2.5754 km^{2}). Quezon's goal was to create a place for the working class, coinciding with the planned transfer of the University of the Philippines campus in Manila to a more suitable location, which became another precedent for the creation of Quezon City.

As early as 1928, the University of the Philippines (UP) had planned to expand by adding more academic units and constructing new buildings. The university experienced increase in enrollment and its planned expansion was hampered by its small campus in Manila. The revised Burnham Plan of Manila envisioned the new campus to be located just outside Manila's city limits at 'the heights behind Manila'. The UP Board of Regents informed Quezon of their desire to relocate the campus and he was supportive of the idea. Furthermore, he wanted the facilities in the Manila campus to be used for government purposes. In 1939, Quezon urged the National Assembly to enact UP's relocation and on June 8, 1939, Commonwealth Act No. 442 was passed, enacting the transfer of UP outside of Manila. A portion of Marikina Estate, which was adjacent to Magdalena Estate, was chosen as the new site with an approximate area of 600 hectares (1,500 acres). Additional land from the Diliman Estate was also added as part of the new university campus.

==== Creation of Quezon City ====
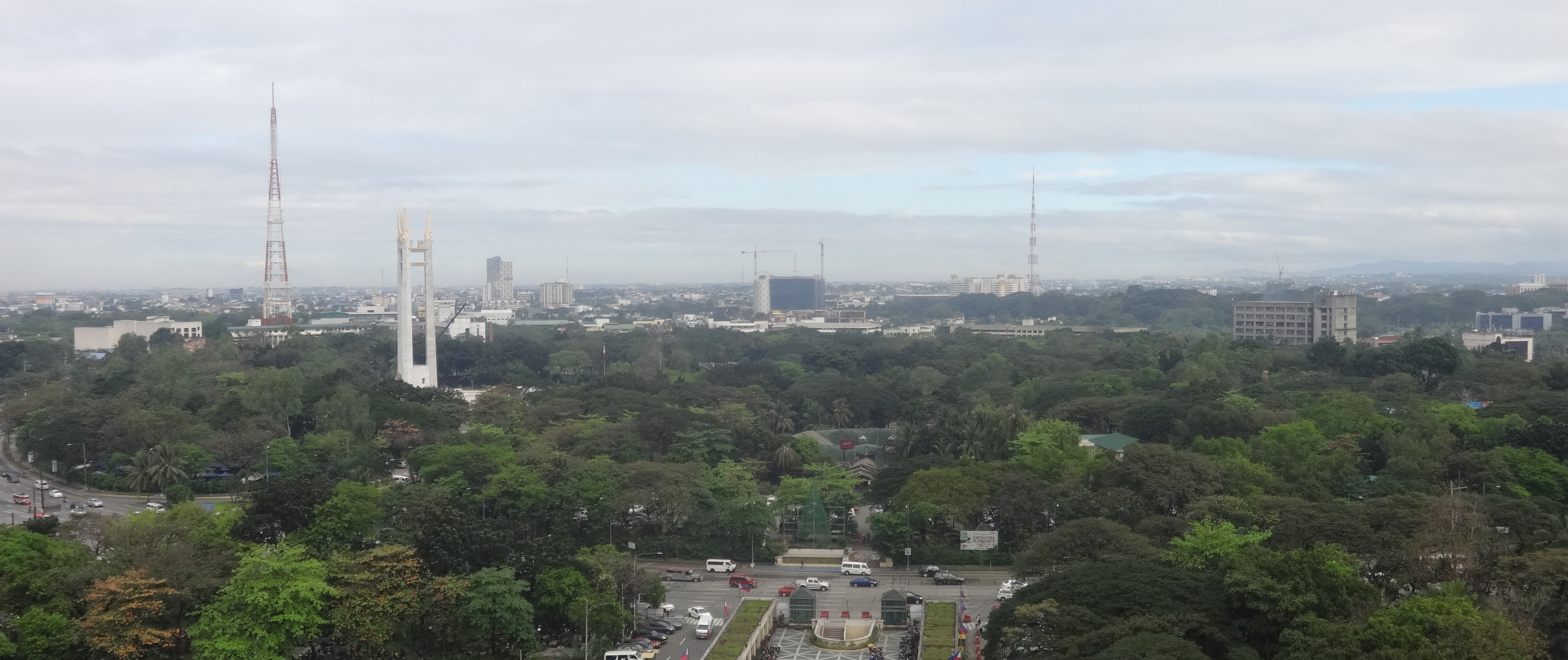
Quezon Memorial Circle is the focal point of the newly established capital city, site of the proposed National Capitol building.

With the development of the People's Homesite Corporation housing in the Diliman Estate and the creation of the new UP Campus, the creation of Quezon City was justified. On October 12, 1939, Commonwealth Act No. 502, also known as the Charter of Quezon City, was passed by the National Assembly, which created Quezon City. President Quezon signed Commonwealth Act No. 502 on October 12, 1939, after it was passed by the National Assembly on September 28, 1939 as Assembly Bill No. 1206 The city was originally to be known as Balintawak City according to the first bill filed by Assemblyman Ramon P. Mitra from Mountain Province, but Assemblymen Narciso Ramos and Eugenio Perez, both from Pangasinan, amended and successfully lobbied the assembly to name the city after the President in honor of his role in the creation of this new city. The creation of Quezon City halted the full implementation of the Burnham Plan of Manila and funds were diverted for the establishment of the new capital.

Several barangays from different towns were carved out to correspond to the estates that PHC bought for the creation of Quezon City. The new city had an area of 7,355 hectares (73.55 km^{2}), and the barrios and sitios that were taken for its creation were the following: Bagubantay (Bago Bantay), Balingasa, Balintauac (Balintawak), Kaingin, Kangkong, Loma (La Loma), Malamig, Matalahib, Masambong, San Isidro, San Jose, Santol and Tatalon, were taken from Caloocan; Cubao, Diliman, Kamuning, New Manila, and San Francisco del Monte were taken from San Juan; Balara, Barranca (Barangka), Jesus de la Peña, Krus na Ligas, Tañong and the site of the new UP Campus were taken from Marikina; and, the barrios and sitios of Libis, and Ogong (Ugong Norte) from Pasig. Commonwealth Act No. 659, enacted on June 21, 1941, changed the city's boundaries. Under this law, the area of Wack Wack Golf and Country Club were to be reverted to Mandaluyong, and the barrios of lower Barranca and Jesus de la Peña were reverted to Marikina. However, Camp Crame was taken out of San Juan and was given to Quezon City.

1939, the year the city was established, recorded a population of 39,103 people. The city in its early days was predominantly rural, but Quezon asked American Architect William Parsons to craft a master plan for the newly created city. Parsons was the one who advised Quezon to locate the National Government Center in Diliman instead of Wallace Field (now Rizal Park), due to the possibility of naval bombardment from Manila Bay. He died in December 1939 and his partner Harry T. Frost took over and become the lead planner. Frost arrived in the Philippines on May 1, 1940, and became the architectural adviser of the Philippine Commonwealth government. Together with Juan M. Arellano, Alpheus D. Williams, and Welton Becket, they created the Master Plan for Quezon City which was approved by the Philippine government in 1941. The Frost Plan featured wide avenues, large open spaces, and roundabouts at major intersections. The plan for major thoroughfares made by Louis Croft for the Greater Manila Area served as the backbone for the Plan of Quezon City. The center of the city was a 400-hectare (990-acre) quadrangle formed by four avenues — North, West, South and East — which was designed to be the location of the National Government of the Philippines. At the northeast corner of the Quadrangle was a large roundabout, a 25-hectare (62-acre) elliptical site, were the proposed Capitol Building is envisioned to rise.

To make the city accessible, Quezon ordered Luzon Bus Lines to ply from Kamuning towards Tutuban in Divisoria, Manila to provide transport for the city's residents. However, the fare was not affordable to minimum wage earners. Because of the city's unaffordable housing prices and lack of transportation for low-income earners, the goal of creating mass housing for the working class was not met. Instead, those who opted to live in Quezon City consisted of middle-class households such as those in Kamuning, whose residents petitioned to rename it from Barrio Obrero (Worker's Community) to Kamuning (a type of tree that grows abundantly in the area) because its residents were not Obreros (Workers).

=== Japanese occupation ===
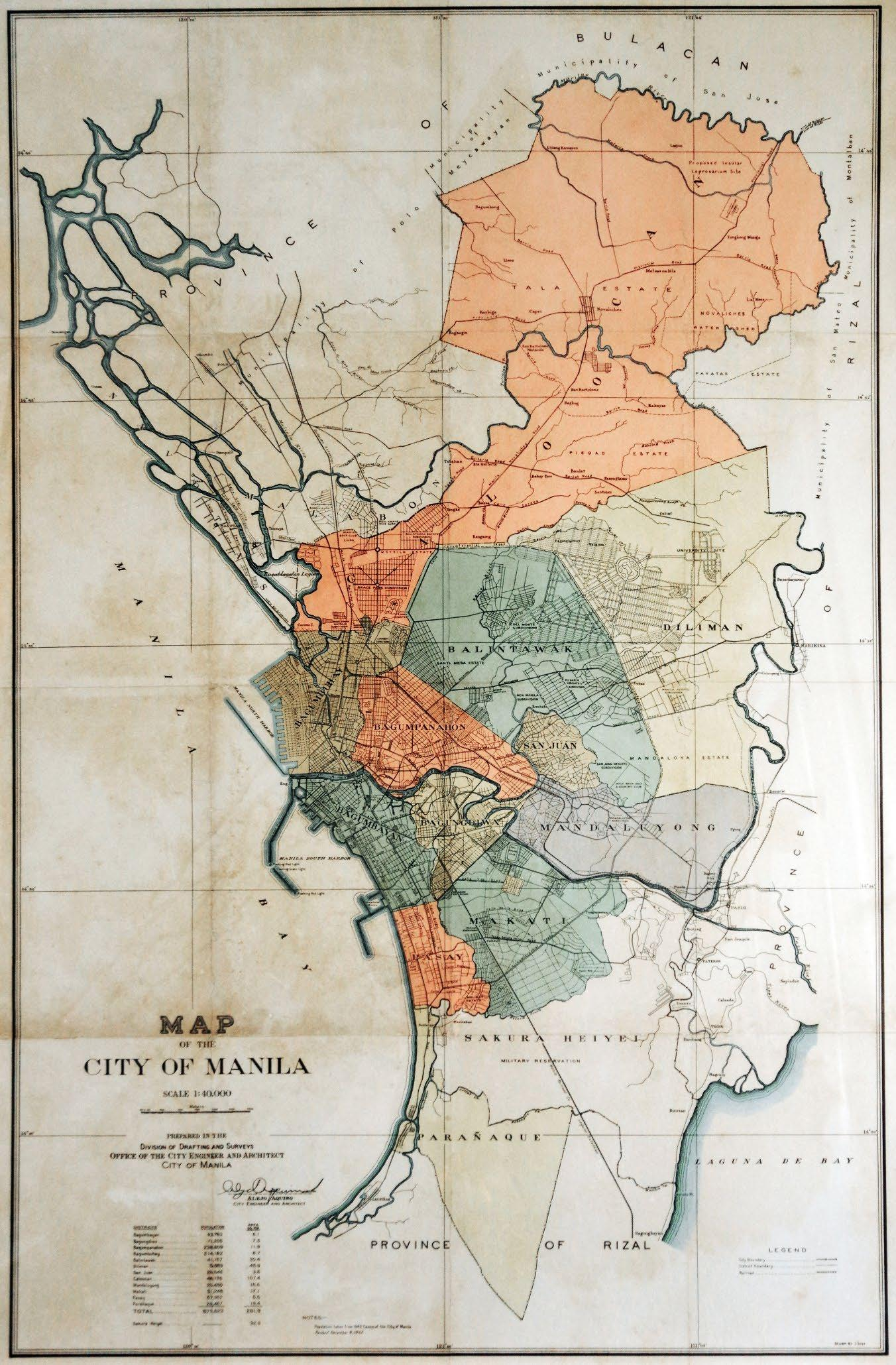
Map of the City of Greater Manila in 1942, showing Quezon City divided into two districts—Balintawak and Diliman—during its incorporation.

The Philippine Exposition in 1941 was held on the newly established Quezon City, but participants were limited to locals because of the increasing turbulence at the beginning of the Second World War. Eventually, parts of Manila were bombed by the Japanese Imperial Forces in December 1941, bringing the war to the Philippines. It was from Zablan Field in Camp Murphy on 10 December 1941 that the Sixth Pursuit Squadron of the Philippine Army Air Corps led by Capt. Jesús A. Villamor flew to intercept Japanese naval aircraft which resulted in the first aerial victory of the Philippine military. On January 1, 1942, President Quezon issued Executive Order No. 400 as an emergency measure to form the City of Greater Manila, with Jorge B. Vargas as its designated mayor. It merged the city with Manila and the towns of Caloocan, Makati, Mandaluyong, Parañaque, Pasay, and San Juan. The mayors of these towns and cities served as the assistant mayor of their respective localities and were under the mayor of Greater Manila. The City of Greater Manila was the basis for the formation of Metro Manila in 1975.

After Imperial Japanese forces conquered the Philippines during the Pacific War, the City of Greater Manila was reorganized in 1942 into twelve districts, two of which were formed by dividing Quezon City: Balintawak, which consisted of San Francisco del Monte, Galas, La Loma, New Manila, Santa Mesa Estate, the Wack Wack Golf and Country Club, and the present-day Greenhills, San Juan; and Diliman which was composed of Diliman proper, Cubao, the University District, and the present-day eastern portion of Marikina. In the same year, the patients of Quezon Institute were relocated to the San Juan de Dios Hospital in Intramuros and the Japanese military used the facility for its own sick and wounded, and they also used Saint Joseph's College as a hospital. The Imperial Japanese Army Air Service's Twenty-ninth Squadron equipped with Ki-44 and Ki-84 fighter planes was assigned to Zablan Field of Camp Murphy. This colonial airfield was modernized by the Japanese with the construction of longer concrete runways, which now form the southernmost part of Katipunan Avenue and White Plains Avenue. The Japanese also renamed some streets, most notably South Avenue, which became Timog Avenue. On the morning of 21 September 1944, Zablan Field and three other Japanese airfields in Greater Manila were attacked by American carrier aircraft, which caused President Laurel to issue declarations of martial law and of war. In January 1945, when the Americans returned to mainland Luzon, they gave numerical designations to some roads such as Route 54, which is now Epifanio de los Santos Avenue. In February, the American cavalry and Filipino guerrilla units, advanced into Quezon City, defeating Imperial Japanese forces. Heavy fighting occurred in Novaliches, which at that time was within Caloocan, and New Manila, which had been fortified. Smaller actions were fought at Barrio Talipapa and the University District, and the destruction of the bridge on the Tullahan River delayed the advance of the Americans along Route 52, now known as Quirino Highway. After the Battle of Greater Manila, the City of Greater Manila was dissolved by President Sergio Osmeña, thus separating the cities and towns that were consolidated and regaining their pre-war status. The area that formed the city was then governed by the Philippine Executive Commission.

=== The postwar and independence era ===
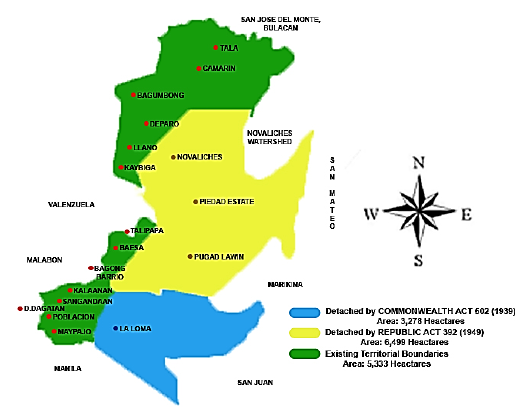
Territories ceded by Caloocan to form Quezon City: Existing territorial boundaries Detached by Commonwealth Act No. 502 (1939) Novaliches area; detached by Republic Act No. 392 (1949)

On July 17, 1948, President Elpidio Quirino signed Republic Act No. 333 into law, making Quezon City the capital of the Philippines. The Act created the Capital City Planning Commission, which was tasked to develop and implement a masterplan for the city. As the capital, the city was expanded northwards, and the barrios of Baesa, Bagbag, Banlat, Kabuyao, Novaliches Proper (Bayan/Poblacion), Pasong Putik, Pasong Tamo, Pugad Lawin, San Bartolome, and Talipapa in Novaliches were ceded from Caloocan. This territorial change caused the division of Caloocan into two non-contiguous parts. Quezon City was formally inaugurated as the capital on October 12, 1949. President Quirino laid the cornerstone on the proposed Capitol Building at Constitution Hills.

On June 16, 1950, the Quezon City Charter was revised by Republic Act No. 537, changing the city's boundaries to an area of 153.59 km^{2} (59 sq mi). Exactly six years later, on June 16, 1956, more revisions to the city's territory were made by Republic Act No. 1575, which defined its area as 151.06 km^{2} (58 sq mi). However, according to the 1995 GIS graphical plot, the city's total area is 161.11 km^{2} (62.20 sq mi), making it the largest Local Government Unit in Metro Manila in terms of land area.

=== The Marcos administration ===
The turn of the decade from the 1960s to the 1970s brought an era of change and tumult throughout the Philippines, with many of the historically significant events of the era taking place in or involving people and groups from Quezon City.

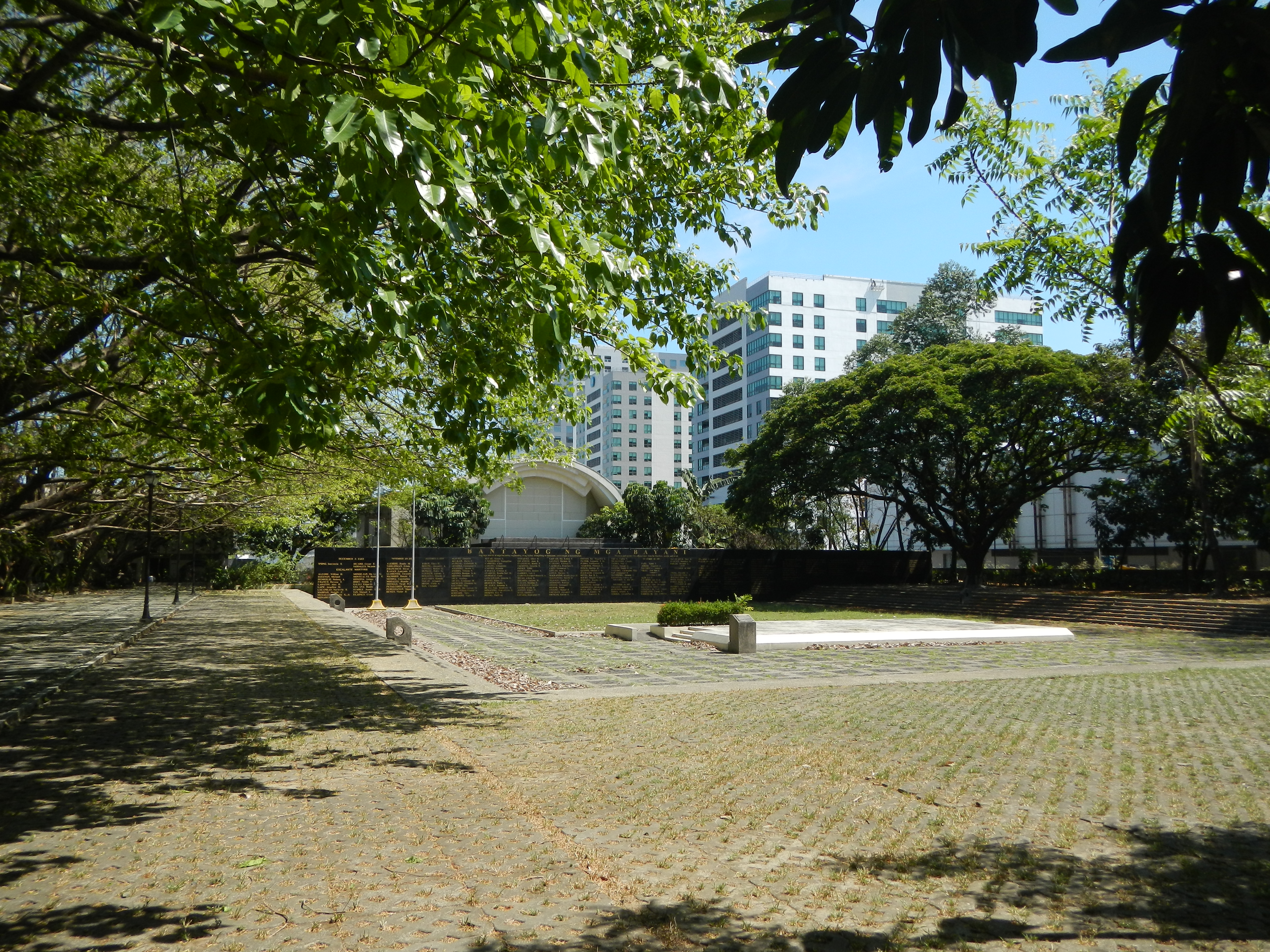
The Bantayog ng mga Bayani was dedicated in honor of all the people that struggled during the Marcos regime.

==== Urbanization and Housing Crisis ====
Quezon City has become a major political, educational, and residential center in the Philippines. Established in 1939 and designated as the national capital in 1948, the city was planned as an urban center for government institutions and a growing population.

As people migrated to Metro Manila in search of employment and better opportunities, the supply of formal housing struggled to accommodate the growing population. Some families settled on vacant land and other areas because they could not afford formal housing. The community began developing in the early 1960s, when settlers occupied a former garbage-dumping site and areas of cogonal grassland. Early residents had limited access to basic services, while some depended on scavenging and garbage collection for their livelihoods.

Quezon City's population rose from 397,990 in 1960 to 754,452 in 1970. This shows an annual growth rate of 6.6%. The rapid growth accompanied expansion as a residential and educational city during the decade.

A 1968 survey of Metropolitan Manila estimated that 32,747 families in Quezon City lived in squatter or slum conditions, out of approximately 183,759 families across the metropolitan area.

==== Government Politics before Martial Law ====
Before the declaration of Martial Law in 1972, Quezon City was an important political and educational center in the Philippines. Although the city had democratic institutions and an active civic environment, its political system reflected broader patterns of elite dominance and patronage in Philippine politics.

==== Local Government and Elections ====
Quezon City's early government was closely connected to the national administration. President Manuel L. Quezon initially served as the city's mayor, while the mayor, vice mayor, and councilors were appointed by the President until local elections began in 1959.

==== Political Elites and Martial Law ====
Quezon City's political structure reflected national patterns in which wealthy families, patronage networks, and established political groups exercised considerable influence. Although elections provided opportunities for political participation, long-serving leaders remained influential in local government. Quezon City's experience before Martial Law illustrates the relationship between local government, national political institutions, and established political elites. While elections and civic participation existed, political influence remained concentrated among long-serving leaders and influential groups. Student protests at UP Diliman and other universities showed how economic grievances and concerns about government policies became part of the political debate in the city.

==== Student Activism in the Pre-Martial Law Period ====
In 1969, students, including those from UP Diliman and universities in the University Belt, protested against high tuition fees and poor school facilities. In February 1969, UP Diliman students held a week-long protest known as the Diliman Strike or Great Cultural Strike. They opposed problems in the education system, high taxes, and the country’s social and economic conditions.

The Diliman Commune took place at the University of the Philippines Diliman from February 1 to 9, 1971. It began when students joined jeepney drivers protesting an increase in oil and gasoline prices. Students and other members of the university community established barricades on campus in support of the transport workers. After student activist Pastor “Sonny” Mesina Jr. was shot, the protest escalated, and the entry of police and military forces intensified concerns about academic freedom and university autonomy. The nine-day protest became a significant episode of student activism and political dissent in Quezon City before the declaration of Martial Law in 1972.

==== Economy before Martial Law ====
Next to Manila, Quezon City had the largest income among the municipal entities in the country and had three times more than Makati, the plushest Manila suburb. Residents of the city had the highest per capita income in the country and had also the highest literacy rate. Quezon City had the most number of housing projects and home sites. The People's Homesite Corporation started with 200 housing units along Diliman creek, now known as Roxas District of PHHC Project 1.

The growth of commercial districts created jobs in construction, government, and education. However, the city’s economic growth was affected when Marcos took over in 1965. In the event, under a slogan of “rice, roads, and schoolhouses,” the first Marcos administration (1965-1969) broke with the conservative fiscal and monetary policy tradition of previous administrations and instead pursued highly expansionary monetary and fiscal policy in an attempt to accelerate economic growth. Government construction spending surged by 92% in 1966-1970 relative to the annual average in the previous five years.

When Ferdinand Marcos' economic policy of using foreign loans to fund government projects during his second term resulted in the 1969 balance of payments crisis, students from Quezon City-based universities, notably the University of the Philippines Diliman and Ateneo de Manila University were among the first to call for change, ranging from moderate policy reforms to radical changes in form of government.

Students from these Quezon City schools, representing a spectrum of positions, were thus at the front lines of the major protests of the first three months of 1970 – what would later be called the "First Quarter Storm." A year later in 1971, this was followed up by the Diliman Commune, in which the students, faculty, and residents of UP Diliman initially planned to protest an impending oil price hike, but because of violent attempts to disperse them, also later demanded that Marcos' military pledge not to assault the campus in the future. In 1972, numerous bombings occurred, including the Quezon City Hall, PLDT Exchange Office at East Avenue, Philippine Trust Company branch office in Cubao, Philippine Sugar Institute building on North Avenue, and more.

==== Media ====
The Philippines was experiencing the “Golden Age of Philippine Journalism.” At the time, the country was known for having one of the freest presses in Asia, as media outlets published unfiltered political controversies and the events happening around the country. Several influential media outlets in the Philippines could be found in Quezon City.

Television and radio were among the mainstream ways to gain reliable sources of information in Quezon City. Two of the major broadcasting networks of the Philippines, ABS-CBN and GMA, can be found in this city. ABS-CBN began with the establishment of the Alto Broadcasting System (ABS), which introduced television broadcasting in the Philippines on October 23, 1953, through its station DZAQ-TV. In 1957, Eugenio Lopez Sr. bought ABS and merged it with the Chronicle Broadcasting Network (CBN), which he owned alongside The Manila Chronicle newspaper. GMA, on the other hand, began as a radio station called “DZBB” in 1950, founded by Robert "Uncle Bob" Stewart. It then entered television broadcasting on October 29, 1961, through RBS Channel 7. Both ABS-CBN and GMA broadcast news programs, entertainment, and locally produced shows through television and radio. These media outlets played an important role in shaping media in the Philippines.

There were also other radio stations based in Quezon City that served educational and religious purposes. On December 2, 1958, the University of the Philippines Diliman established its own radio station called “DZUP,” which was known as the "Voice of the University.” Meanwhile, Radio Veritas, a Catholic radio station, was formally inaugurated in Fairview, Quezon City, on April 11, 1969.

Print media was another important source of news and information for Quezon City residents. The Manila Chronicle was established in 1945 by a group of prewar newspapermen. It was later bought by Don Eugenio Lopez Sr., who also owned ABS-CBN. The University of the Philippines Diliman also had its own university newspaper called “The Philippine Collegian.” This newspaper was written by student journalists, and the publication covered university concerns as well as political and social issues affecting the country. During the late 1960s and early 1970s, it became an important platform for student activism and criticism of the Marcos administration.

==== After the Martial Law proclamation ====
Marcos' declaration of martial law in September 1972 saw the immediate shutdown of all media not approved by Marcos, including Quezon City media outlets such as GMA Channel 7 and ABS-CBN Channel 2. At the same time, it saw the arrest of many students, journalists, academics, and politicians who were considered political threats to Marcos, many of them residents of Quezon City. By the morning after Marcos' televised announcement of the proclamation, about 400 of these arrestees were gathered in Camp Crame on the southwestern reaches of Quezon City, destined to be among the first of thousands of political detainees under the Marcos dictatorship.

Camp Crame would be the site of many of the human rights abuses of the Marcos dictatorship, with one of the first being the murder of student journalist Liliosa Hilao in Camp Crame. Among the prominent cases of abuse suffered specifically by Quezon City residents were the cases of Primitivo Mijares and his sixteen-year-old son Boyet Mijares, who lived in Project 6 at the time of their deaths; Roman Catholic Diocese of Cubao social worker Purificacion Pedro who was murdered by a soldier at her hospital room in Bataan; 23-year old Kamias resident and student activist Roland Jan Quimpo who became a desaparecido; and Cubao-based tailor Rolando "Lando" Federis who was abducted by armed men in Lucena City while accompanying a group of activists to Bicol, tortured, and then killed. In addition, a large number of student activists who were caught, detained, tortured, sexually abused, killed, and disappeared by the regime had been studying in the various universities and colleges in Quezon City.

One of the key moments that led to the eventual demise of the Marcos dictatorship was the 1974 Sacred Heart Novitiate raid, in which a Catholic seminary in Novaliches was raided on the suspicion that communist leaders were hiding there. The arrest of Fr. Benigno Mayo who was the head of the Jesuit order in the Philippines at the time, and Fr. Jose Blanco alongside 21 members of the youth group called Student Catholic Action (SCA), helped convince "the formerly neutral Philippine middle class" that Marcos' powers had grown too great.

As international pressure forced Marcos to start restoring civil rights, other key moments in Philippine history took place in Quezon City. Journalist Joe Burgos established the Quezon City-based WE Forum newspaper in 1977 and in it published a story by Colonel Bonifacio Gillego in November 1982, which discredited many of the Marcos medals. Media coverage of the September 1984 Welcome Rotonda protest dispersal showed how opposition figures including 80-year-old former Senator Lorenzo Tañada and 71-year old Manila Times founder Chino Roces were waterhosed despite their frailty and how student leader Fidel Nemenzo (later Chancellor of the University of the Philippines Diliman) was shot nearly to death.

Most significantly, the August 1983 funeral of assassinated opposition leader of Ninoy Aquino began at the Aquino family household in Times Street, West Triangle, Quezon City, and continued to the funeral mass at Santo Domingo Church in Santa Mesa Heights before the final interment at the Manila Memorial Park – Sucat. The procession took from 9:00 AM until 9:00 PM to finish as two million people joined the crowd. The experience galvanized many of the Philippines into resisting the dictatorship, with protests against Marcos snowballing until they happened nearly every week, and until Marcos was ousted by the People Power revolution.

==== Physical and administrative changes during the Marcos administration ====
In terms of administrative changes during this period, the region of Metro Manila was created as an integrated unit with the enactment of Presidential Decree No. 824 on November 7, 1975. The region encompassed four cities and thirteen adjoining towns, as a separate regional unit of government. A year later, on June 24, 1976, Manila was reinstated by President Marcos as the capital of the Philippines for its historical significance as the seat of government since the Spanish Period. Presidential Decree No. 940 states that Manila has always been to the Filipino people and in the eyes of the world, the premier city of the Philippines being the center of trade, commerce, education and culture. Concurrent with the reinstatement of Manila as the capital, Ferdinand Marcos designated his wife, Imelda Marcos, as the first governor of Metro Manila, who started the construction of massive government edifices with architectural significance as she re-branded Manila as the "City of Man".

On March 31, 1978, President Marcos ordered the transfer of the remains of President Quezon from Manila North Cemetery to the newly completed Quezon Memorial Shrine. It now houses the mausoleum where President Quezon and his wife Aurora Aragon Quezon are interred. It also contains a museum dedicated to President Quezon and his life.

=== EDSA Revolution and Resistance of Quezon City Residents to the Marcos Sr. Regime ===
Before EDSA People Power Revolution in 1986, a massive, city-wide Noise Barrage protest on April 6, 1978 was staged. Residents of Metro Manila, Quezon City, and neighboring areas made deafening sounds from banging pots, sounding car horns, and church bells to demonstrate resistance against Marcos Sr.'s vote-rigging.

In 1986, the nonviolent People Power Revolution, led by Corazon Aquino and Cardinal Jaime Sin, ousted Marcos from power. Thousands of people flocked EDSA between Camp Crame and Camp Aguinaldo in a series of popular demonstrations and civil resistance against the Marcos government that occurred between February 22 and 25, 1986.

==== Commemorative monuments ====
All of the three major monuments commemorating the Martial Law era are located in Quezon City. The People Power Monument and the EDSA Shrine were built in the city to commemorate the event, with the latter being a symbol of the role that the Catholic Church played in the restoration of democracy in the Philippines. The Bantayog ng mga Bayani was constructed along Quezon Avenue to honor the heroes and martyrs that struggled under the 20-year Marcos regime. The Wall of Remembrance at the Bantayog honors prominent figures during the martial law era.

=== Contemporary ===
EDSA Shrine

On February 23, 1998, Republic Act. No. 8535 was signed by President Fidel Ramos, which paved the way for the creation of the City of Novaliches by carving out the 15 northernmost barangays of Quezon City. The voting process only includes the affected barangays, but then-city mayor of the town Ismael "Mel" Mathay Jr. lobbied to include the whole city. He also campaigned against the secession of Novaliches. In the succeeding plebiscite that was held on October 23, 1999, an overwhelming majority of Quezon City residents rejected the secession of Novaliches. Mathay was succeeded by Feliciano Belmonte Jr., who served as the city mayor from 2001 to 2010.

On May 1, 2001, numerous residents of Barangay Holy Spirit who were protesting against the arrest of former president Joseph Estrada marched from EDSA Shrine to Malacañang and participated in the May 1 riots against President Gloria Macapagal Arroyo.

In the 2010 local elections, actor Herbert Bautista, who served as Vice mayor during Mathay's and Belmonte's terms, was elected as the city mayor. During his term, the Quezon City Pride Council was established. It was the first LGBT council in the Philippines. He also initiated numerous socialized housing projects called "Bistekville". Bautista was succeeded by Maria Josefina "Joy" Belmonte in 2019, who has served as the vice mayor under his term and the daughter of former Quezon City mayor Feliciano Belmonte Jr. She was then reelected as city mayor in 2022, after which the Quezon City People's Council was established. Under the Participation, Accountability and Transparency Ordinance, the council would serve as an umbrella for about 2,232 civil society organizations accredited by the city government as a means for more civic participation and as for the council to be the “eyes, ears and voice” of the city residents in the city government.

Beginning March 15, 2020, Quezon City was placed under community quarantine, which were introduced due to the COVID-19 pandemic in the country. The strictest quarantine was the enhanced community quarantine in 2020 and 2021, in response to the then-ongoing pandemic in the city, which has infected more than 100,000 of the city's residents with more than 1,200 deaths. The quarantine was later downgraded to the alert level system (ALS) in 2021 until the state of public health emergency was lifted by President Bongbong Marcos on July 21, 2023.

In the afternoon of June 15, 2025, 61-year-old civil servant Mauricio "Morie" Pulhin, the Technical Staff director of the House Ways and Means Committee, was attending his daughter's birthday party in a gated subdivision in Barangay Commonwealth when two motorcycle-riding assailants entered the venue and fatally shot him at close range. Police officials noted that based on evidence, the shooting was carefully planned out by the assailants. House Speaker Martin Romualdez issued a statement the next day denouncing the "brutal act of violence in the strongest possible terms" and called on the Philippine National Police (PNP) and the National Bureau of Investigation (NBI) to conduct a thorough and impartial investigation.

On May 28, 2026, Quezon City was selected to host the Palarong Pambansa (National Games) in 2027. It last hosted the event in 1966.

== Geography ==
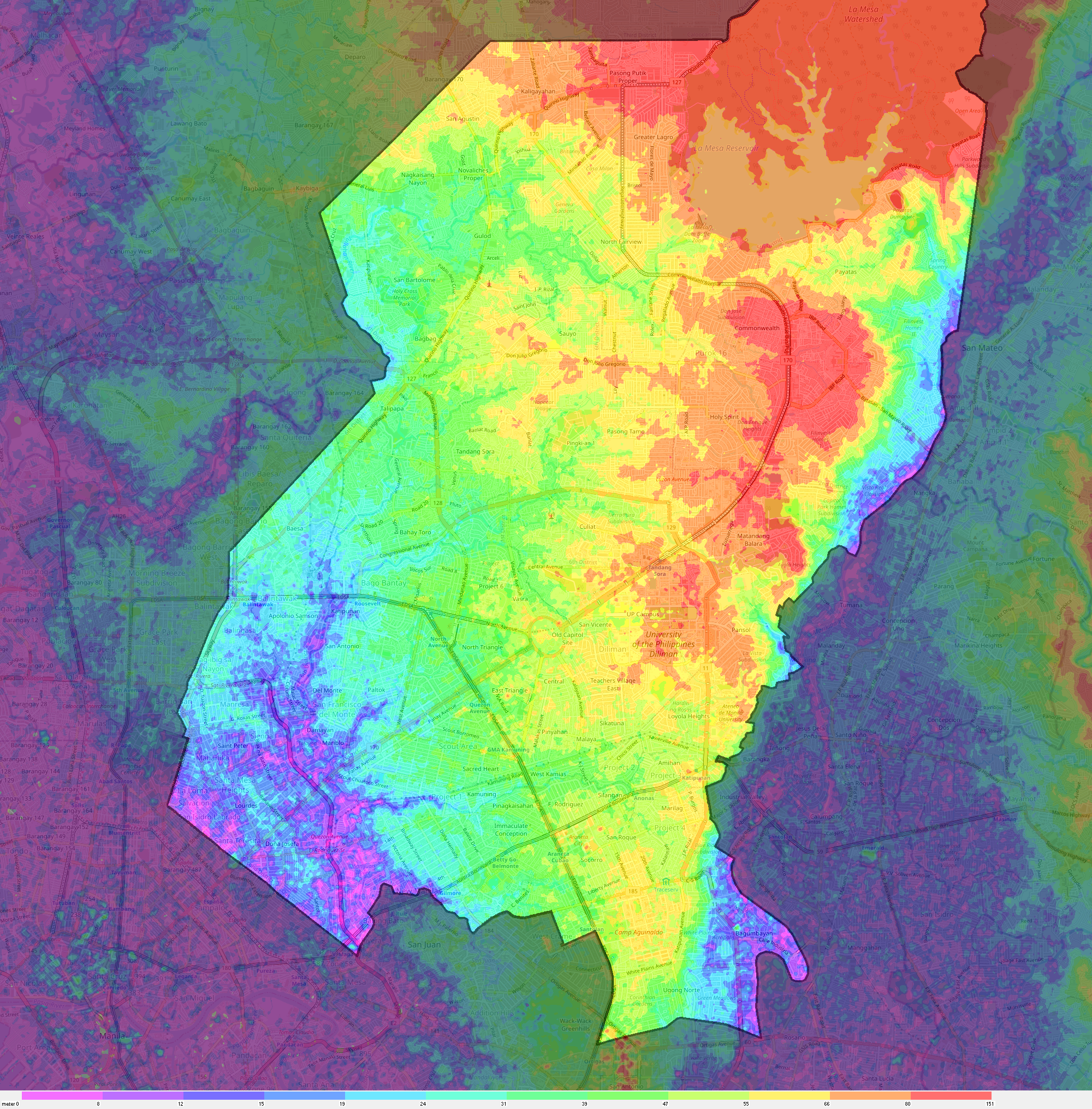
Elevation map of Quezon City. The drop in elevation along the eastern border of the city follows the length of the West Valley Fault.

The geography of Quezon City is characterized by undulating terrain. The city is within the catchment area of five river systems – Marikina, Pasig, San Juan, Tullahan and Meycauayan – along with their creeks and tributaries with a total length of almost 200 km (120 mi). The city has an area of 161.11 km^{2} (62.20 sq mi), according to the 1995 GIS graphical plot, making it the largest Local Government Unit (LGU) in Metro Manila in terms of land area. Since its creation in 1939, the city's boundary were revised four times; the final revision was made thru Republic Act No. 1575, which placed the city's territory at 151.06 square kilometers (58.32 sq mi). Meanwhile, the Philippine Statistics Authority placed the city's land area at 171.71 square kilometers (66.30 sq mi), based on data provided by the Land Management Bureau. According to the Philippine Institute of Volcanology and Seismology and Geoscience Australia on their study earthquake impact and risk assessment on the Greater Metropolitan Manila Area, the total area of Quezon City is at 165.33 km^{2} (64 sq mi).

Quezon City is bounded by Rodriguez and San Jose del Monte to the north, Marikina and San Mateo to the east, Pasig to the southeast, Mandaluyong and San Juan to the south, Manila to the southwest, and Caloocan and Valenzuela to the west and northwest. The city lies on the Guadalupe Plateau, a relatively high plateau at the northeast of the metropolis situated between the lowlands of Manila to the southwest and the Marikina River Valley to the east. The highest elevation in Quezon City is the northern tip of the La Mesa Watershed Reservation at 250 meters (820 ft) above sea level. The West Valley Fault traverses the eastern border of the city.

=== Barangays and congressional districts ===
Left: Barangays of Quezon City.
Right: The six legislative districts of Quezon City.

Quezon City is politically subdivided into 142 barangays. These barangays are grouped into six congressional districts, with each district being represented by a congressman in the House of Representatives. Each congressional district has six City Councilors. The number of barangays per district is: District I, 37; District II, 5; District III, 37; District IV, 38; District V, 14; and District VI, 11; Although District II has the fewest barangays, it is the biggest in land area, including the Novaliches Reservoir.

- District I (2015 population: 409,962) covers barangays Alicia, Bagong Pag-asa, Bahay Toro, Balingasa, Bungad, Damar, Damayan, Del Monte, Katipunan, Mariblo, Masambong, N.S. Amoranto (Gintong Silahis), Nayong Kanluran, Paang Bundok, Pag-ibig sa Nayon, Paltok, Paraiso, Phil-Am, Ramon Magsaysay, Salvacion, San Antonio, San Isidro Labrador, San Jose, Santa Cruz, Santa Teresita, Santo Cristo, Talayan, Veterans Village and West Triangle. It has an area of 19.59 km^{2} (7.56 sq mi).
- District II (2015 population: 688,773) covers barangays Bagong Silangan, Batasan Hills, Commonwealth, Holy Spirit and Payatas. It is the most populous district in the country from 1987 to 2013, before it was partitioned and its northern part became the 5th District and its western part became the 6th District.
- District III (2015 population: 324,669) covers barangays Amihan, Bagumbuhay, Bagumbayan, Bayanihan, Blue Ridge A, Blue Ridge B, Camp Aguinaldo, Claro, Dioquino Zobel, Duyan-Duyan, E. Rodriguez, East Kamias, Escopa I, Escopa II, Escopa III, Escopa IV, Libis, Loyola Heights, Mangga, Marilag, Masagana, Matandang Balara, Milagrosa, Pansol, Quirino 2-A, Quirino 2-B, Quirino 2-C, Quirino 3-A, Saint Ignatius, San Roque, Silangan, Socorro, Tagumpay, Ugong Norte, Villa Maria Clara, West Kamias and White Plains.
- District IV (2015 population: 446,122) covers barangays Bagong Lipunan ng Crame, Botocan, Central, Kristong Hari, Damayang Lagi, Doña Aurora, Doña Imelda, Doña Josefa, Don Manuel, East Triangle, Horseshoe, Immaculate Conception, Kalusugan, Kamuning, Kaunlaran, Krus na Ligas, Laging Handa, Malaya, Mariana, Obrero, Old Capitol Site, Paligsahan, Pinyahan, Pinagkaisahan, Roxas, Sacred Heart, San Isidro Galas, San Martin de Porres, San Vicente, Santo Niño, Santol, Sikatuna Village, South Triangle, Tatalon, Teachers Village East, Teachers Village West, U.P. Campus, U.P. Village and Valencia.
- District V (2015 population: 535,798) covers barangays Bagbag, Capri, Fairview, Greater Lagro, Gulod, Kaligayahan, Nagkaisang Nayon, North Fairview, Novaliches Proper, Pasong Putik Proper, San Agustin, San Bartolome, Santa Lucia and Santa Monica. It is more commonly known as Novaliches.
- District VI (2015 population: 531,592) covers barangays Apolonio Samson, Baesa, Balon-Bato, Culiat, Miguel, New Era, Pasong Tamo, Sangandaan, Sauyo, Talipapa, Tandang Sora and Unang Sigaw.

=== Climate ===
Quezon City

Climate chart (precipitation, max. and min. temperature)
J	F	M	A	M	J	J	A	S	O	N	D
27 31 21	24 32 22	33 33 23	42 35 24	212 34 25	323 33 25	517 32 25	569 31 25	500 32 24	284 32 24	141 32 23	115 31 22
- █ Average max. and min. temperatures in °C
- █ Precipitation totals in mm
- Source: PAGASA
Imperial conversion
J	F	M	A	M	J	J	A	S	O	N	D
1.1 87 71	1 89 71	1.3 91 73	1.6 94 75	8.3 94 77	13 92 77	20 89 76	22 88 76	20 89 76	11 89 75	5.6 89 74	4.5 87 72
- █ Average max. and min. temperatures in °F
- █ Precipitation totals in inches

According to the Köppen climate classification, Quezon City has a tropical monsoon climate (Am). The city has a dry season from December to April, in which in turn, divided into cool and warm dry seasons, and a prolonged wet season from May to November that brings heavy rains in some areas.

The primary weather station of the city is located at the PAGASA Science Garden. It has been observed that extreme temperatures ranged from a record high of 38.5 °C (101.3 °F) to a record low of 14.9 °C (58.8 °F). The hot season was observed for 1.5 months, from April to May, with an average daily high temperature of 32.8 °C (91.0 °F). Meanwhile, the cool season lasts for 2.6 months, from November to February, with an average temperature of below 30.5 °C (86.9 °F).

About 20 typhoons enter the Philippines every year, affecting Quezon City and the rest of Metro Manila. In recent years, heavy rainfalls from Habagat (south west monsoon) became as destructive as typhoons, triggering floods and landslides which endangers the city's residents living near the riverbanks.

Climate data for Science Garden, Quezon City (1991–2020, extremes 1961–2024)
Month	Jan	Feb	Mar	Apr	May	Jun	Jul	Aug	Sep	Oct	Nov	Dec	Year
Record high °C (°F)	34.7 (94.5)	35.6 (96.1)	36.8 (98.2)	38.2 (100.8)	38.5 (101.3)	38.0 (100.4)	36.2 (97.2)	36.1 (97.0)	35.6 (96.1)	35.4 (95.7)	35.0 (95.0)	34.9 (94.8)	38.5 (101.3)
Mean daily maximum °C (°F)	30.6 (87.1)	31.5 (88.7)	32.9 (91.2)	34.6 (94.3)	34.4 (93.9)	33.1 (91.6)	31.8 (89.2)	31.2 (88.2)	31.5 (88.7)	31.7 (89.1)	31.6 (88.9)	30.7 (87.3)	32.1 (89.8)
Daily mean °C (°F)	26.0 (78.8)	26.5 (79.7)	27.8 (82.0)	29.4 (84.9)	29.8 (85.6)	29.1 (84.4)	28.2 (82.8)	27.9 (82.2)	27.9 (82.2)	27.8 (82.0)	27.4 (81.3)	26.6 (79.9)	27.8 (82.0)
Mean daily minimum °C (°F)	21.4 (70.5)	21.5 (70.7)	22.6 (72.7)	24.1 (75.4)	25.1 (77.2)	25.0 (77.0)	24.5 (76.1)	24.6 (76.3)	24.4 (75.9)	23.9 (75.0)	23.2 (73.8)	22.4 (72.3)	23.6 (74.5)
Record low °C (°F)	15.5 (59.9)	15.1 (59.2)	14.9 (58.8)	17.2 (63.0)	17.8 (64.0)	18.1 (64.6)	17.7 (63.9)	17.8 (64.0)	20.0 (68.0)	18.6 (65.5)	15.6 (60.1)	15.1 (59.2)	14.9 (58.8)
Average rainfall mm (inches)	27.1 (1.07)	24.4 (0.96)	32.9 (1.30)	41.7 (1.64)	211.9 (8.34)	322.7 (12.70)	516.6 (20.34)	568.5 (22.38)	500.3 (19.70)	283.6 (11.17)	141.4 (5.57)	114.5 (4.51)	2,785.6 (109.67)
Average rainy days (≥ 1.0 mm)	4	3	4	5	12	17	21	21	21	15	12	8	143
Average relative humidity (%)	77	73	70	68	73	79	83	85	84	82	81	80	78
Mean monthly sunshine hours	241.3	239.0	287.6	289.2	270.6	241.4	210.6	209.2	205.4	223.8	230.2	219.3	2,867.6
Source 1: PAGASA
Source 2: Weather.Directory

== City districts ==
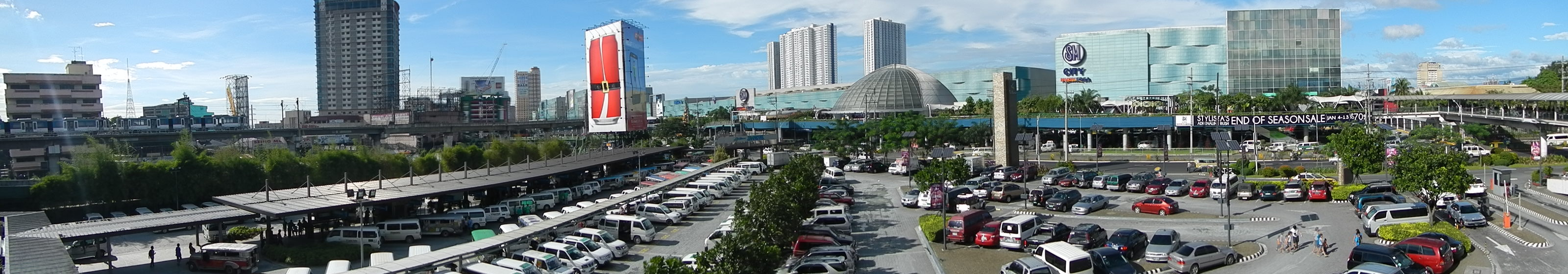
2013 panorama of North EDSA, featuring SM North EDSA.

Quezon City is politically subdivided into six legislative districts. However, the city is also divided into non-legislative or informal districts based on its historical origins. For instance, the district of San Francisco del Monte, which is not listed as a legislative district, was originally a pueblo owned by Franciscan missionary Fray Pedro Bautista. Additionally, the Diliman Quadrangle was planned to be the city center of Quezon City.

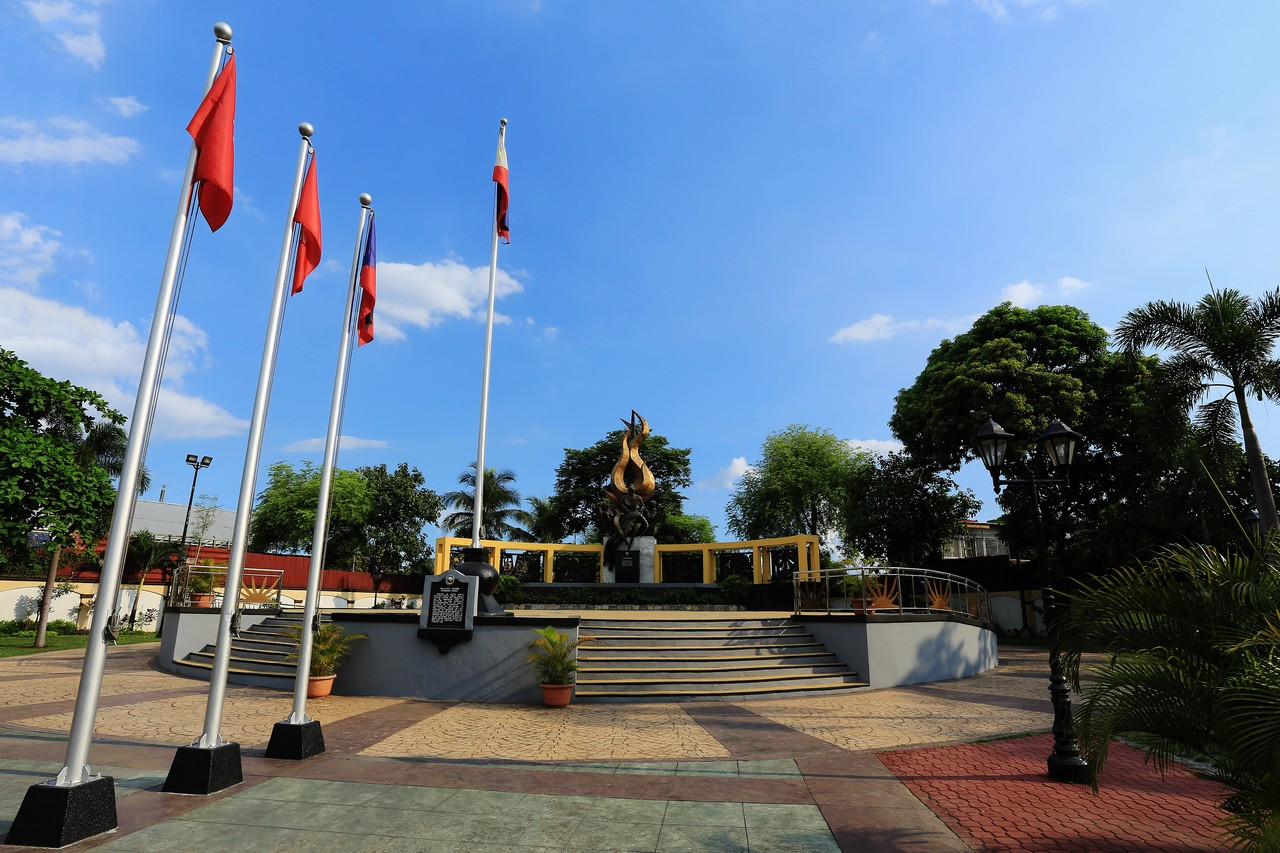
Tandang Sora National Shrine in Balintawak is dedicated to Melchora Aquino, who was a prominent figure in the Philippine Revolution.

Historic Socorro Water Towers in Socorro, Cubao which has been converted as the Socorro Barangay Hall

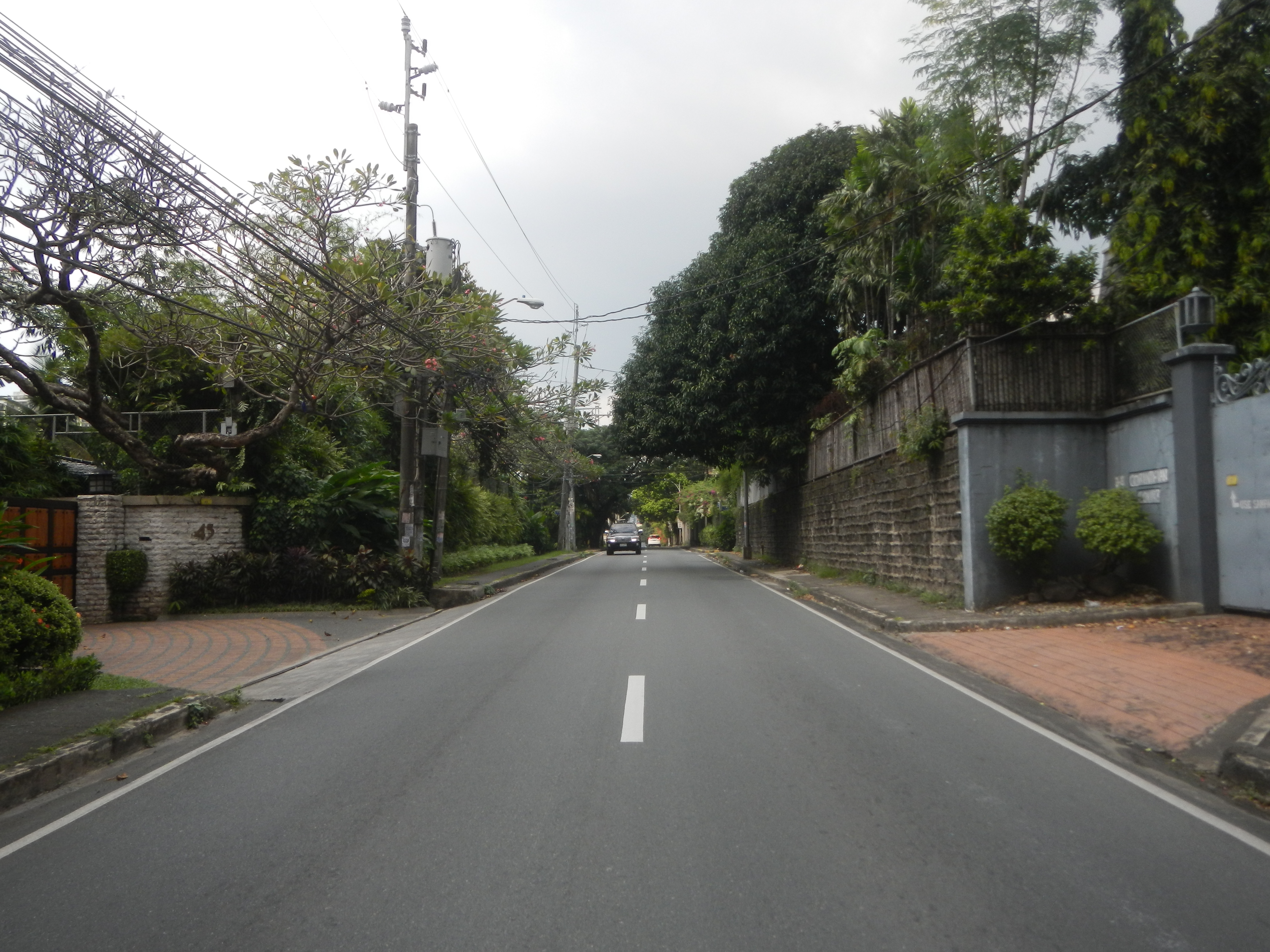
Balete Drive in New Manila is known in Filipino folklore as a haunted place, where a white lady purportedly appears.

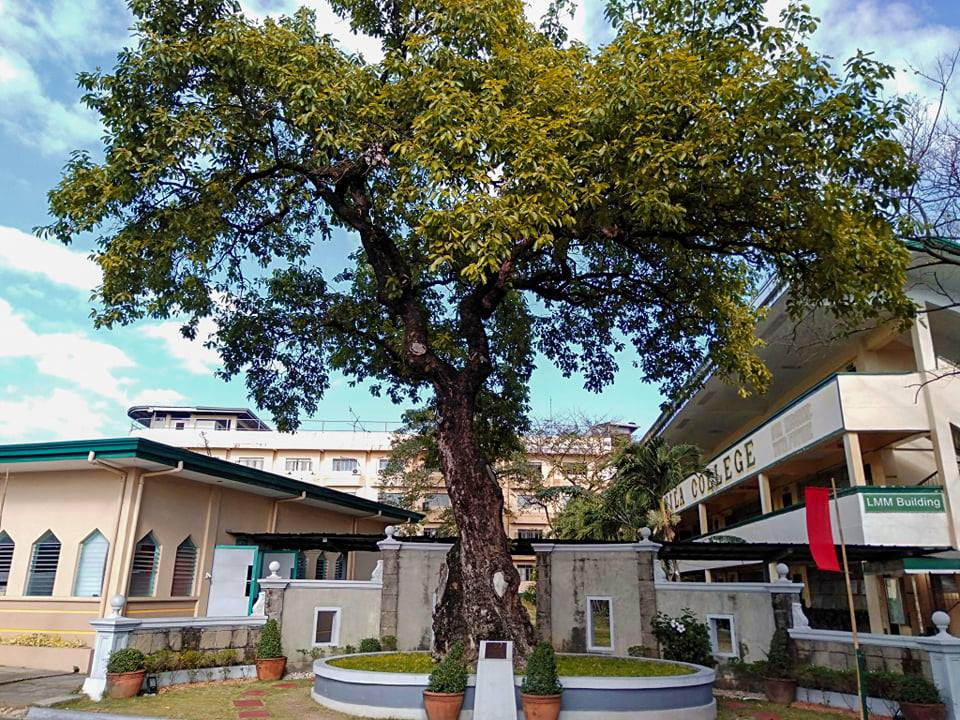
The 150 years old Katipunan Tree (duhat) inside the Metro Manila College campus in Kaligayahan, Novaliches

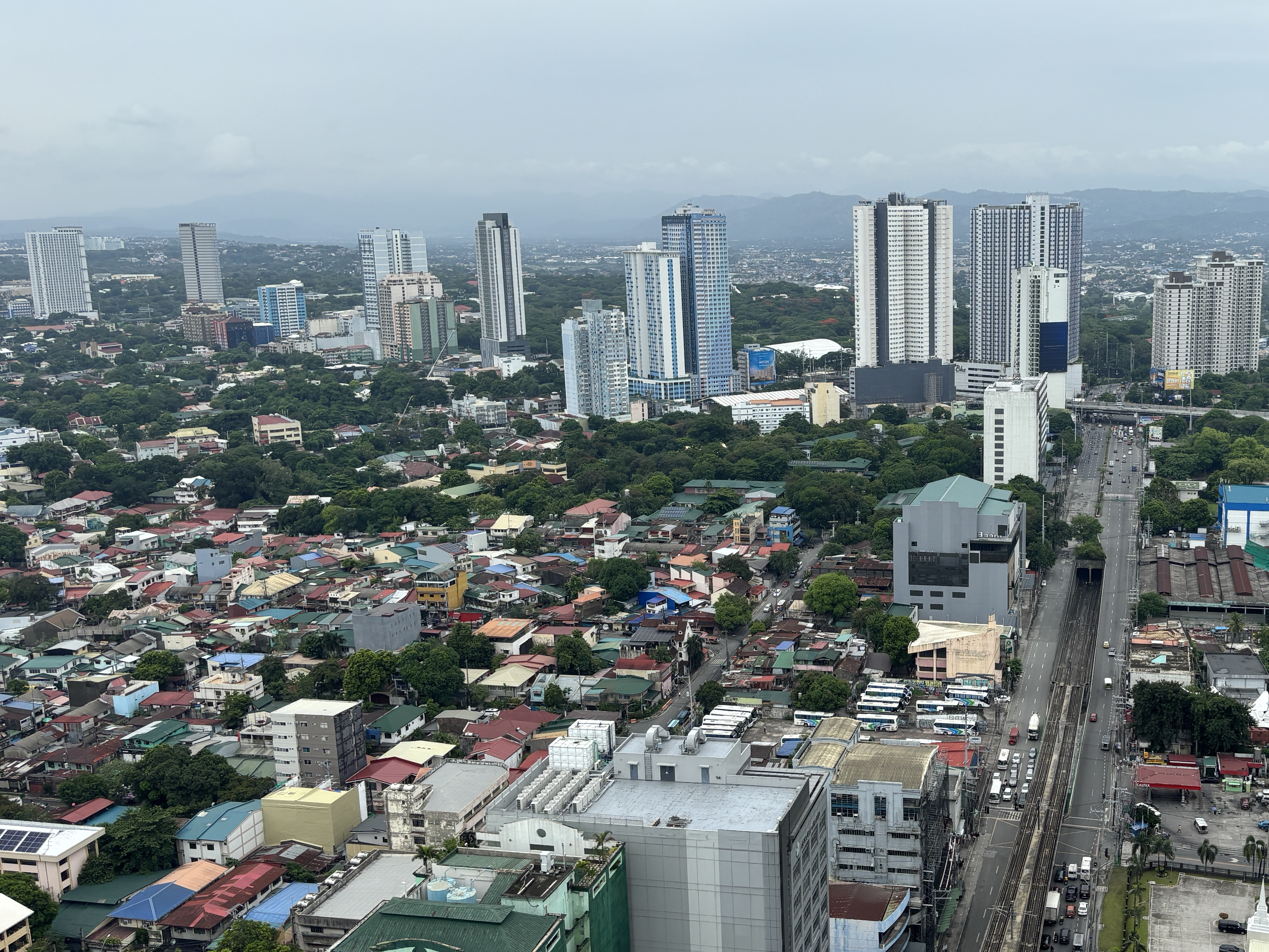
Project 3 and Loyola Heights

SM City Santa Mesa

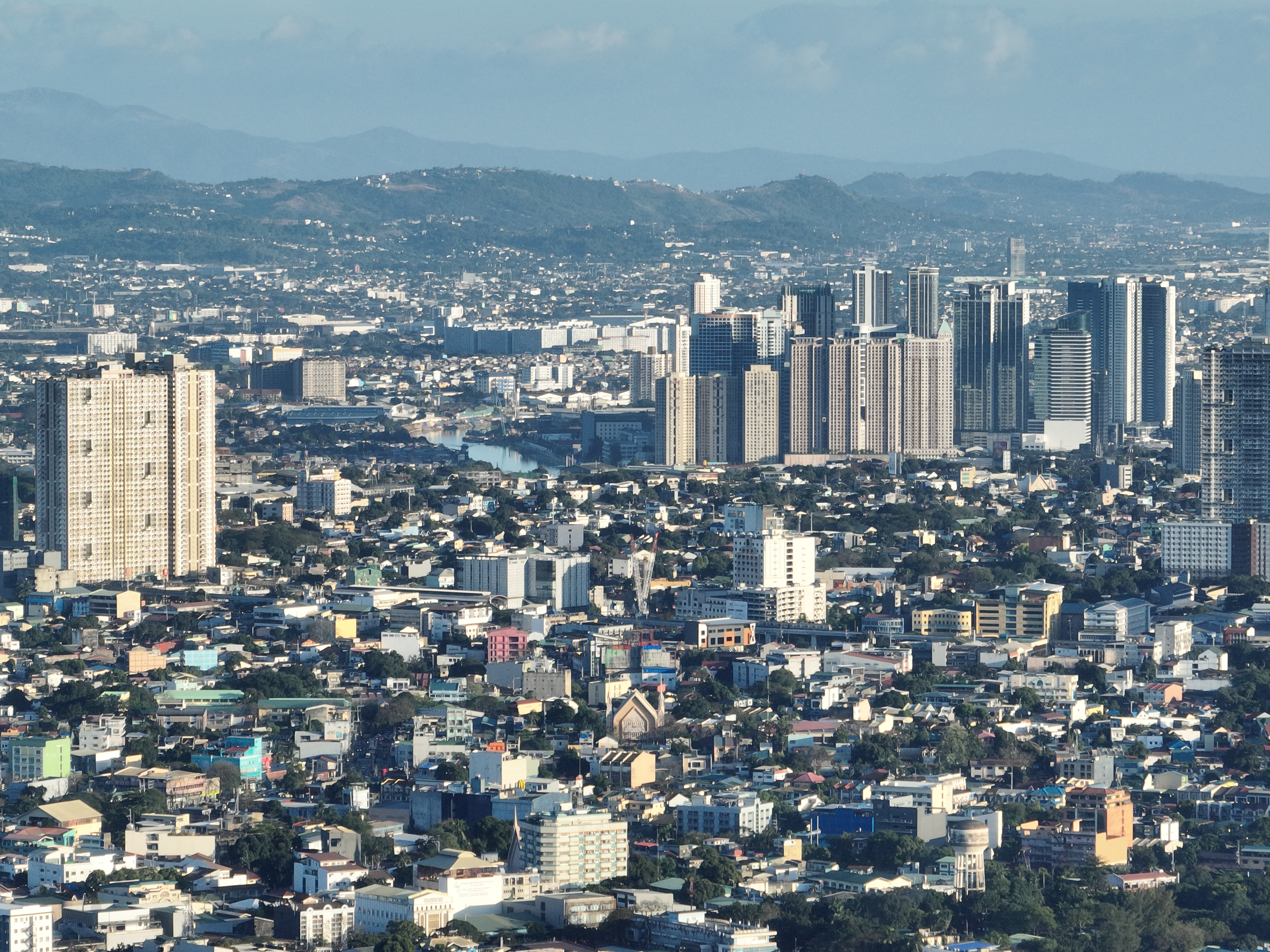
A drone shot of the Project 3 and Project 4 districts, with Eastwood City in the background

- Bago Bantay: Located at the west central part of the city, this place is known as a residential area at the back of SM North EDSA. It is composed of barangays Alicia, Ramon Magsaysay, Santo Cristo, and the northern part of Bagong Pag-asa. Bago-Bantay started as a small visita in the early 1930s under the jurisdiction of San Pedro de Bautista parish in San Francisco del Monte. This area mark as part of North EDSA portion from North Avenue and West Avenue stretches all the way to Congressional Avenue and Fernando Poe Jr. Avenue with Project 7.
- Cubao: Located at the southern part of the city, Cubao is the home of the 35-hectare (86-acre) Araneta City, a mixed-use township development that contains prominent shopping malls such as Ali Mall, Farmers Plaza and Gateway Mall and iconic landmarks such as the Smart Araneta Coliseum. The Cubao Cathedral is the seat of the Roman Catholic Diocese of Cubao. A number of provincial bus terminals are also located.
- Diliman: Diliman is located at the center of Quezon City, the place where the city was originally established. The area is named for the Tagalog word for the medicinal fern species Stenochlaena palustris, Numerous national government offices are located in Diliman, as well as prominent colleges and universities such as the University of the Philippines Diliman, FEU–FERN College, and New Era University. The Diliman Quadrangle, which is bounded by the North, West, South (Timog) and East Avenues, is known for its hospitals, government edifices, and nightlife bars. Several streets in South Triangle and Barangay Laging Handa were named in honor of the 22 Boy Scouts who died in a plane crash en route to joining the 11th World Scout Jamboree. A memorial stands in the center of the roundabout at the intersection of Timog Avenue and Tomas Morato Avenue. The place was thus known as the Scout Area. Major commercial broadcasting media and television networks such as ABS-CBN and GMA have their headquarters within the Diliman Quadrangle. PTV, RPN, IBC, and PBS also hold headquarters in Diliman.
- Galas: The Galas-Santol District of Quezon City is located in its southwest border with the City of Manila. The barangays of Dona Imelda, Dona Josefa, Dona Aurora and Don Manuel, named after public figures who significantly contributed to the city's early development, are located in this area. Barangays of Santo Nino, Santol and San Isidro serve as the border of Sampaloc and Santa Mesa in Manila. SM City Sta. Mesa lies at the end of the Araneta avenue set as the crossing border within the three cities of San Juan, Quezon City and Manila.
- La Loma: La Loma is located the southwestern portion of the city. It has five barangays along the vicinity of its main streets: N.S. Amoranto Avenue (Retiro) and A. Bonifacio Avenue. The district is famed as the birthplace of many popular Filipino culinary figures and establishments especially devoted to the lechon. The nearby La Loma Cemetery is named after this place.
- New Manila: New Manila is named after the City of Manila, since most of its residents are affluent families from the city who wished to escape the stress of living in the capital. It was formerly a part of San Juan before being carved out from its mother town to form Quezon City. Among its notable residents are the Hemady-Ysmael Family, the original landowner of New Manila, and Dona Narcisa de Leon, the matriarch of LVN Studios. It is also the birthplace of Eraño Manalo, the Second Executive Minister of Iglesia ni Cristo. New Manila is also known for Balete Drive, which is a haunted place according to Filipino folklore where the spirit of a white lady haunts the road seeking help from passing drivers.
- Novaliches: Novaliches is the largest district in Quezon City, which made up almost all the northern portion of the city after Batasan Hills. It contains the La Mesa Watershed Reservation and its Dam and Reservoir where most of Metro Manila's water supply came from. It was originally a part of Caloocan before being incorporated to Quezon City in 1948, when the latter was declared as the capital. Before the place was incorporated to Quezon City in 1948, Novaliches was already in the maps as early as 1864, having been organized by the Spanish as early as 1855, from the haciendas of Tala, Malinta, Piedad, and Maysilo. By 1856, it was its own municipality before being absorbed by Caloocan in 1901. Novaliches is still known by its historical boundaries. The whole of North Caloocan up to the banks of the Marilao River bordering Bulacan to the north, parts of the historic Polo section of Valenzuela to the west, and parts of San Jose del Monte, Bulacan to the upper reaches of Tungkung Mangga and the old Tala Leprosarium in the northeast and east, are still referred to as within the old enclave of Novaliches that many residents consider to this day.
- Project 1: Also known as Barangay Roxas or Roxas District. Barangay Roxas was the first housing project undertaken by the Philippine Homesite Housing Corporation in compliance with an Executive Order by President Manuel Roxas in 1948.
- Project 2: Made up of barangays Quirino 2-A, Quirino 2-B and Quirino 2-C. Specifically known as Anonas.
- Project 3: Made up of barangays Quirino 3-A, Amihan, Claro and Duyan-Duyan. Specifically known as Anonas.
- Project 4: Located within the eastern area beside Cubao.
- Project 5: Also known as Barangay E. Rodriguez.
- Project 6: Project 6 in Diliman is an affluent barangay that is known for hospitals such as the Philippine Children's Medical Center (PCMC) and the Veterans Memorial Medical Center (VMMC), as well as the home of Philippine Science High School Main Campus. The Office of the Ombudsman and the Ninoy Aquino Parks and Wildlife Center are located here.
- Project 7: Project 7 is made up of barangays Bungad and Veterans Village.
- Project 8: Project 8 is made up of barangays Bahay Toro, Baesa, and Sangandaan.
- San Francisco del Monte: San Francisco del Monte was founded as a pueblo by Saint Pedro Bautista in 1590, is considered as Quezon City's oldest district. The original land area of the old town was approximately 2.5 square kilometers (1.0 sq mi), including parts of Project 7 and 8, and Timog Avenue. It is bounded by West Avenue on the east, Epifanio De Los Santos Avenue on the north, Quezon Avenue on the south, and Araneta Avenue on the west. It was originally a part of San Juan before it was carved out of its mother town to form Quezon City. The district is made up of barangays San Antonio, Paraiso, Paltok, Mariblo, Masambong, Manresa, Damayan, and Del Monte. SFDM featured a hilly topography with lush vegetation and mineral springs, in the midst of which the old Santuario de San Pedro Bautista was built as a retreat and monastery for Franciscan friars. The headquarters of IBC is located here.
- Santa Mesa Heights: Santa Mesa Heights is an affluent neighborhood where many middle-class and upper-middle-class families reside. It is mostly residential. It is the home to the National Shrine of Our Lady of Lourdes and the National Shrine of Our Lady of La Naval. Prominent Catholic educational institutions such as the Angelicum College, Lourdes School of Quezon City, and St. Theresa's College of Quezon City are located here. During the Commonwealth Period, Santa Mesa Heights was considered as the ideal site for universities, located just outside the suburban city limits of Manila.
  - Quezon City Chinatown: The Quezon City Chinatown is a designated tourism and business district and the city's Chinatown, located primarily along Banawe Street in the Santa Mesa Heights area. It was declared a business district through Ordinance No. SP-1573 in 2005 and later designated a tourism district under City Ordinance SP-2453 in 2015. The district is known for its abundance in authentic Chinese restaurants and businesses, serving as an alternative to the historic Chinatown in Binondo. An annual Chinese New Year celebration is also held along Banawe Street. It is also known as the "Autoparts Capital of the Philippines" due to the high number of businesses specializing in automotive parts and accessories.

== Cityscape ==
=== Architecture ===
The Philippine Heart Center, one of the country's designer hospitals, was designed in the Brutalist style.

The Quezon Memorial Circle at sunset

The architecture in Quezon City features a wide variety of architectural styles, such as Art Deco, Brutalist, International Modern, Postmodern and Contemporary styles. The city also has numerous monuments and museums. When the city was created in 1939, Art Deco was the prevailing architectural style, moving forward from the colonial designs of Bahay na bato by the Spanish, and the Neoclassical style by the Americans. The choice of designing buildings in contemporary international style was intentional to show that the Philippines was moving forward since it was anticipating independence in 1945.

The Quezon Memorial Shrine, which was built from 1952 to 1978, was designed in the Art Deco style. It became the city's symbol and at its base was a museum and mausoleum dedicated to the late Manuel L. Quezon and his wife Aurora. When the city became the capital in 1948, a lot of government buildings transferred from Manila to Quezon City. Numerous government buildings were built during the terms of President Elpidio Quirino, Ramon Magsaysay, Carlos P. Garcia, Diosdado Macapagal and Ferdinand Marcos. However, it was only during the term of Marcos that began the Filipinization of architecture. Numerous government hospitals in the city such as the Lung Center of the Philippines, Philippine Heart Center, and the Kidney Center of the Philippines were built and regarded as "designer" hospitals. Traditional Filipino design motifs were incorporated in government buildings such as the Batasang Pambansa, which drew inspiration from the Bahay Kubo and the Bahay na bato. Most of the government buildings and structures built during the time of Marcos were associated with the "edifice complex" of the Marcoses.

=== Master Plans ===
In 1938, President Manuel L. Quezon made a decision to push for a new capital city. Manila was getting crowded, and his military advisors reportedly told him that Manila, being by the bay, was an easy target for bombing by naval guns in case of attack. The new city will be located at least 15 km (9 mi) away from Manila Bay, which is beyond the reach of naval guns. Quezon contacted William E. Parsons, an American architect and planner, who had been the consulting architect for the islands early in the American colonial period. Parsons came over in the summer of 1939 and helped select the Diliman (Tuason) estate as the site for the new city. He died later that year, leaving his partner Harry Frost to take over. Frost collaborated with Juan Arellano, engineer A.D. Williams, and landscape architect and planner Louis Croft to craft a grand master plan for the new capital. The plan was approved by the Philippine authorities in 1941.

The core of the new city was to be a 400-hectare (990-acre) Central Park, about the size of New York's Central Park, and defined by the North, South (Timog), East and West Avenues. On one corner of the proposed Diliman Quadrangle was delineated a 25-hectare (62-acre) elliptical site, the focal point of the grand quadrangle. This was the planned location of a large Capitol Building to house the Philippine Legislature and ancillary structures for the offices of representatives. On either side of the giant ellipse were supposed to have been the new Malacañang Palace on North Avenue (site of the present-day Veterans Memorial Hospital), and the Supreme Court Complex along East Avenue (now the site of East Avenue Medical Center). The three branches of government were to be finally and efficiently located in close proximity to each other.

== Demographics ==
Population census of Quezon City
Year	Pop.	±% p.a.
1939	39,013	—
1948	107,977	+11.98%
1960	397,990	+11.48%
1970	754,452	+6.60%
1975	956,864	+4.88%
1980	1,165,865	+4.03%
1990	1,669,776	+3.66%
1995	1,989,419	+3.34%
2000	2,173,831	+1.92%
2007	2,679,450	+2.93%
2010	2,761,720	+1.11%
2015	2,936,116	+1.17%
2020	2,960,048	+0.17%
2024	3,084,270	+0.99%
Source: Philippine Statistics Authority

According to the 2024 Philippine census, Quezon City has a population of 3,084,270 people, making it the most populous city in the Philippines. As of the 2015 census, the population of Quezon City comprises 22.80% or about 1/4 of Metro Manila's population. From a population of 39,013 people when the city was established in 1939, the city tremendously grew and reached the one million mark in 1980 with a population of 1,165,865. The city reached another milestone when its population reached the two million mark in 2000 with a population of 2,173,931. The city's population density is at 18,222 people per km^{2}, lower than Metro Manila's population density at 20,247 people per km^{2}. As of 2020, the city's most populous barangay is Commonwealth with 198,285 inhabitants, while the least populous is Quirino 3-A with 1,140 inhabitants.

As of 2015, the average size of a household in Quezon City is 4.3 members. It has a generally young population with an average of 28 years. Females comprise 50.71% (1,488,765) while males comprise 49.29% (1,447,351). Children and youth alone (0–30 years old) constitute more than half (58.78% or 1,725,832) of the city's total population.

Tagalog, which is spoken natively by 46.78% of the city's population, is the most spoken language in Quezon City. Among the more minor languages spoken in the city is Bisaya/Binisaya (13.47%), followed by Bikol (9.03%), Ilocano (8.13%), Hiligaynon/Ilonggo (4.34%), Pangasinan/Pangasinense (2.64%), Cebuano (2.55%), Kapampangan (1.72%), Masbateño (0.57%), Boholano (0.51%) and other languages (10.23%).

=== Religion ===
Religion in Quezon City
1. Catholicism (86.2%)
2. Protestantism (5.63%)
3. Iglesia ni Cristo (4.62%)
4. Islam (1.10%)
5. Other / non-affiliated (2.40%)

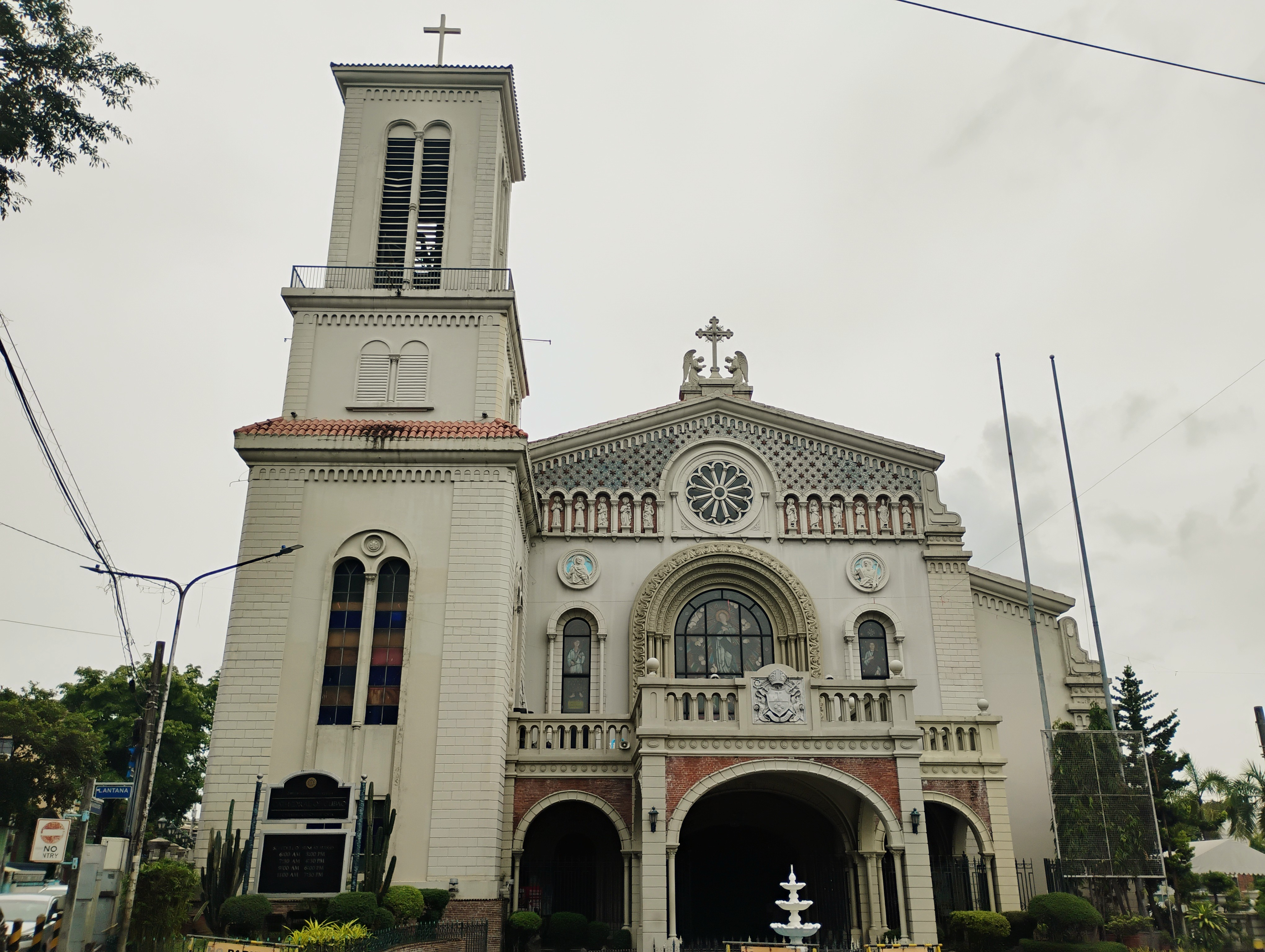
Immaculate Conception Cathedral in Cubao

Central Temple of the Iglesia ni Cristo in New Era

Quezon City is a predominantly Roman Catholic city, with the religion being followed by about 86.25% of its population. The city is home to the seats of the Roman Catholic Dioceses of Cubao and Novaliches, as well as the Military Ordinariate of the Philippines. It is followed in size by various Protestant faiths, which have seen a significant increase in membership over recent decades and are well represented in Quezon City. The third largest religion is Iglesia ni Cristo, whose Central Temple and main office are located along Commonwealth Avenue in New Era. Finally, a significant population of Quezon City belongs to the Islamic faith, the fourth largest religion in the city.

Protestantism has strong presence in Quezon City. Several Evangelical, Protestant and Charismatic churches have their main headquarters, churches, and seminaries in the city. The main headquarters of the National Council of Churches in the Philippines (NCCP), Philippine Council of Evangelical Churches (PCEC) and the United Church of Christ in the Philippines (UCCP) are located in the city. The Episcopal Church in the Philippines has its national office in Cathedral Heights, New Manila, including the National Cathedral of Saints Mary and John.

Jesus Is Lord Church Worldwide (JIL) has many branches in the city. The church is currently building the JIL Cornerstone Central, a 12-storey, 5,000 seating worship center located in Balintawak. Jesus Miracle Crusade held its weekly service at Amoranto Sports Complex, with thousands of people in attendance. The Church of Jesus Christ of Latter-day Saints (LDS Church) has the Manila Philippines Temple and the Missionary Training Center located at Temple Drive, Green Meadows Subdivision in Ugong Norte. The Iglesia Filipina Independiente (Aglipayan Church) has three parishes located in the city: the Parish of the Crucified Lord in Apolonio Samson, Parish of the Holy Cross inside the UP Diliman Campus, and the Parish of the Resurrection in Balingasa. The Philippine Branch office of the Jehovah's Witnesses is located along Roosevelt Avenue. The headquarters of the UCKG HelpCenter (Universal Church of the Kingdom of God) is located at the former Quezon Theater in Araneta City, Cubao. There are also numerous Members Church of God International (Ang Dating Daan) churches in the city.

Other churches that have their main churches in the city include Bread of Life Ministries International, Jesus is our Shield Worldwide Ministries, The Church So Blessed, People of Grace Fellowship, Tabernacle of Faith International, Word of Hope Christian Family Church, Church of the Lord of Hosts, Jesus Christ Saves Global Outreach (JCSGO) and Jesus the Blessed Redeemer International Ministry (JBRIM).

=== Poverty, housing and urban slums ===
Poverty incidence of Quezon City (%)

Source: Philippine Statistics Authority

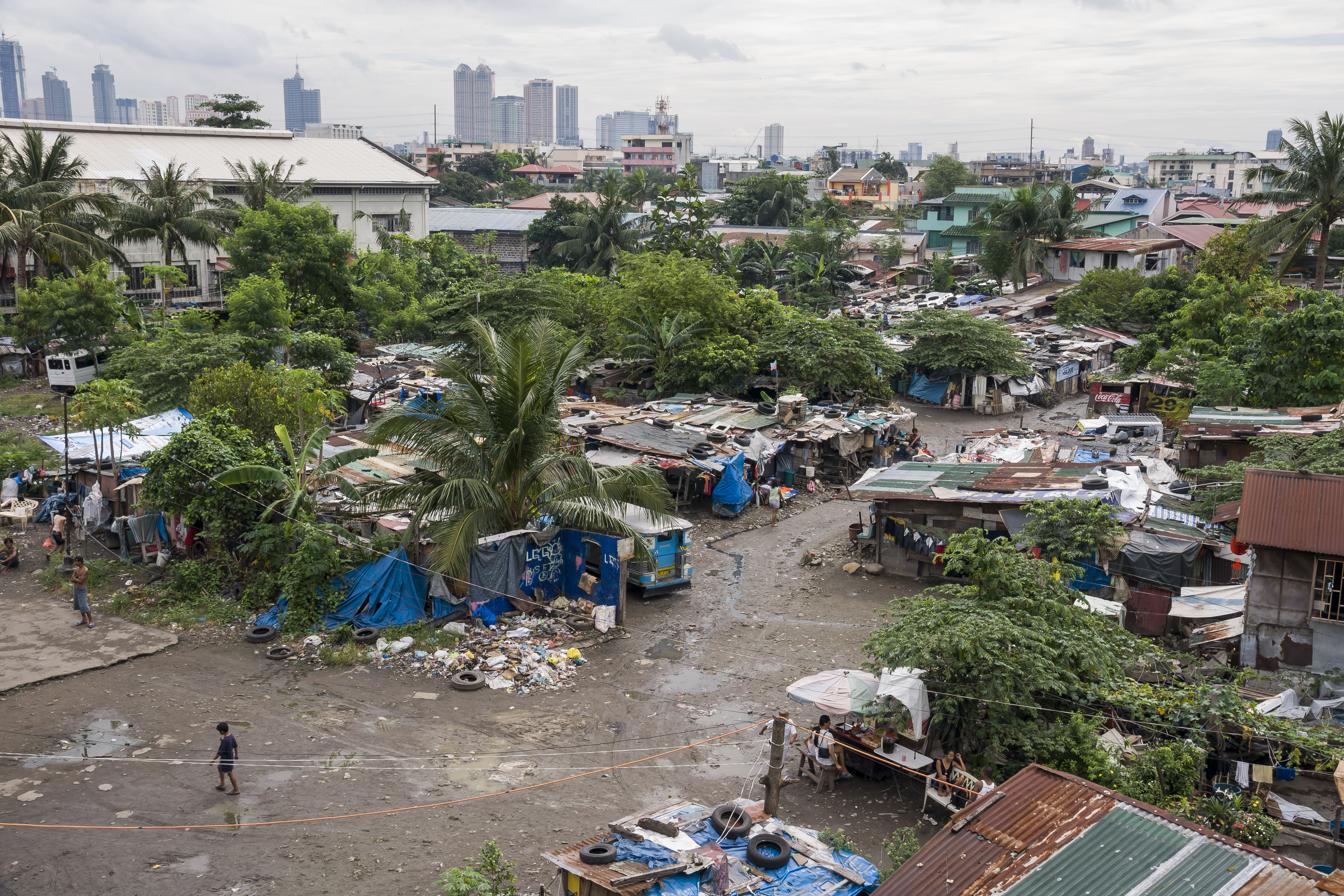
Slum in Damayang Lagi

As of 2013, there are 196,818 informal settler families in Quezon City living in 151,890 structures. 48,927 of these families live along waterways, along right of ways, or within other danger areas.

The Quezon Task Force on Socialized Housing and Development of Blighted Areas (Task Force Housing) is the lead agency of the city government for addressing the needs of socialized housing within the city. Its goal is to direct and coordinate various city departments to develop housing projects and conduct other community development related activities. The goal of the city's socialized housing program is to provide a safe, decent and sustainable home for the city's informal settlers and slum dwellers. The program involves the collaboration between different national and local government agencies, including the private sector. The flagship housing program of the city is the Bistekville communities, which were named by former Mayor Herbert "Bistek" Bautista after himself while he was in office from 2010 to 2019. The naming was controversial to an extent, for it was considered a form of political epal because his name was affixed on a public works project. As of 2018, Quezon City has 37 Bistekville projects with 7,184 beneficiaries. Additionally, there are 960 housing units built by the National Housing Authority (NHA) in barangay Holy Spirit.

== Economy ==
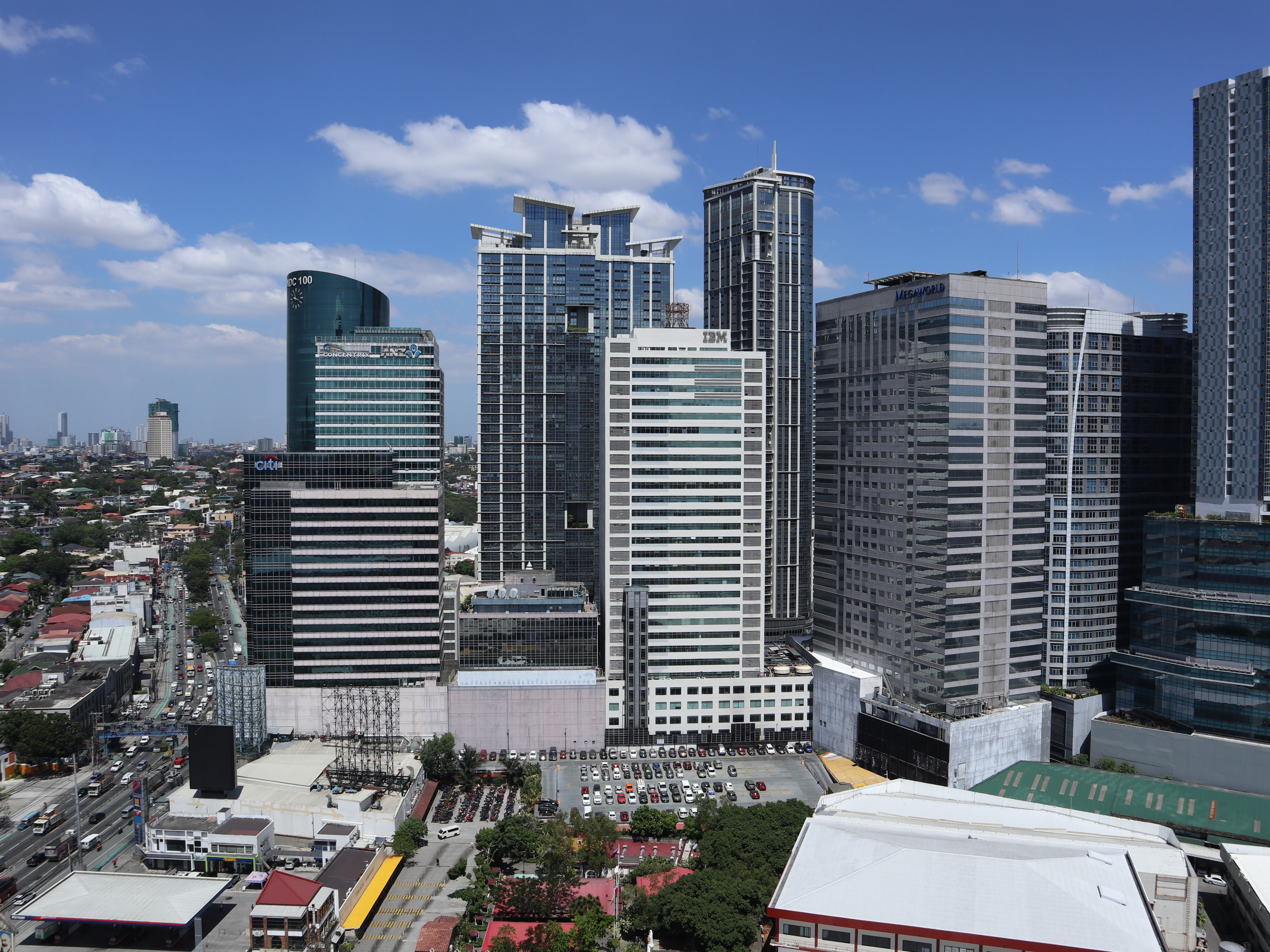
Eastwood City

Quezon City is a hub for business and commerce, as a center for banking and finance, retailing, transportation, tourism, real estate, entertainment, new media, traditional media, telecommunications, advertising, legal services, accountancy, healthcare, insurance, theater, fashion, and the arts in the Philippines. The National Competitiveness Council of the Philippines, which annually publishes the Cities and Municipalities Competitiveness Index (CMCI), ranks the cities, municipalities and provinces of the country according to their economic dynamism, government efficiency and infrastructure. Quezon City was the Most Competitive City in the country from 2015 to 2019 assuring that the city is consistently one of the best place to live in and do business. It earned the Hall of Fame Award in 2020 for its consecutive top performance. There are about 86,000 registered business in the city. As of 2019, Quezon City is the second richest city in the Philippines after Makati. The city's total asset stood at ₱96.4 billion, while it has the biggest liability at ₱21.624 billion. Since 2020, Quezon City is the richest city in the Philippines. The city's total assets amounted to ₱448.51 billion by the end of 2023. As of 2024, Quezon City is the largest economy in the Philippines, with a 6% share to the national gross domestic product totaling ₱1.33 trillion.

=== Information and communications technology ===
Eastwood City in Bagumbayan is the home to country's first and largest cyberpark.

Quezon City bills itself as the ICT capital of the Philippines. Quezon City was the first Local Government Unit (LGU) in the Philippines with a computerized real estate assessment and payment system, which was developed in 2015 that contains around 400,000 property units with capability to record payments. The city has 33 ICT parks according to PEZA, which includes the Eastwood City Cyberpark in Bagumbayan, the first and largest IT Park in the country.

The Department of Information and Communications Technology and National Telecommunications Commission of the Philippines have their respective headquarters in the city.

=== Media and entertainment ===
The GMA Network Center in Diliman is the headquarters of GMA Network Inc.

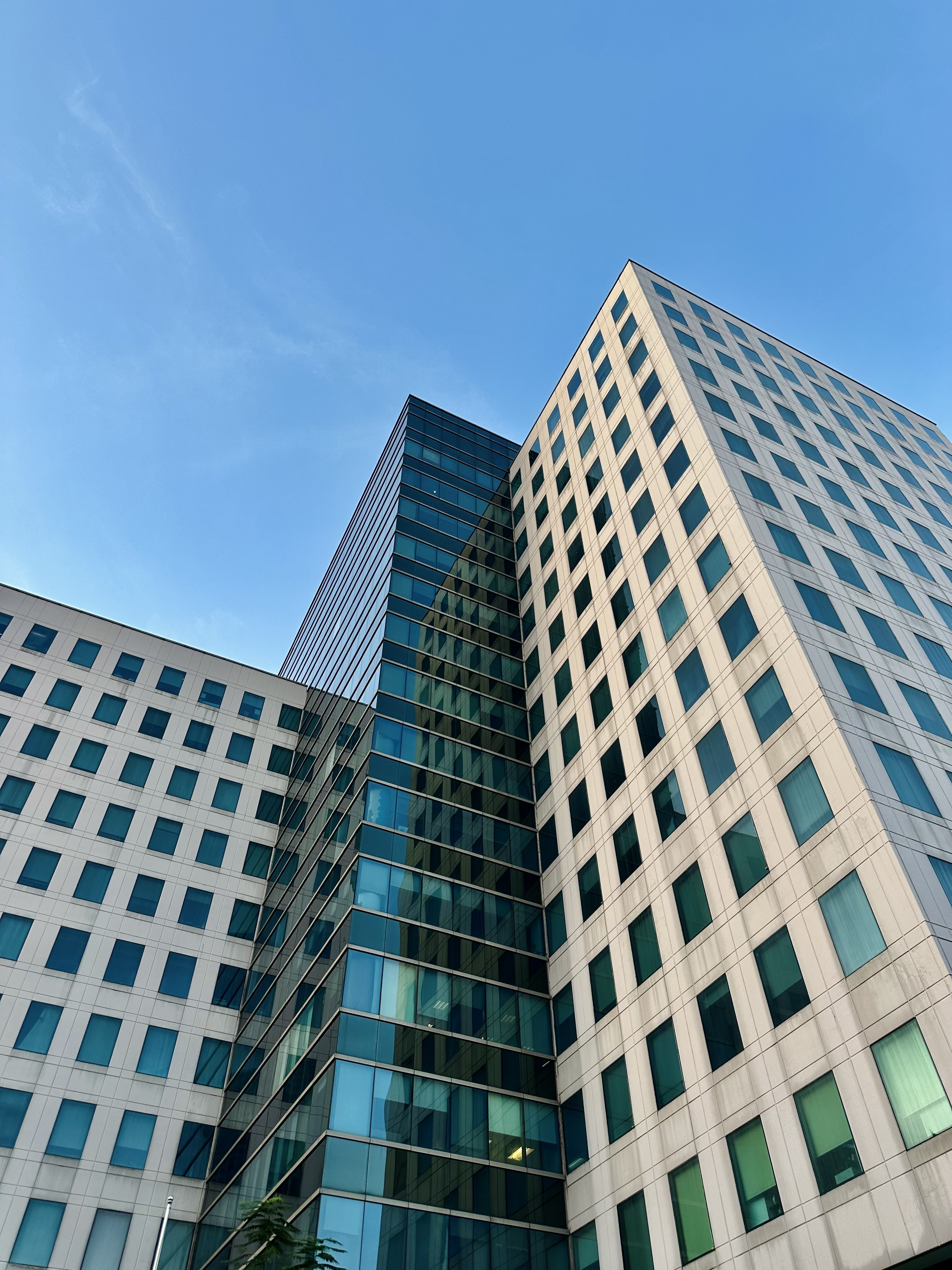
The Eugenio Lopez Jr. Communications Center in Diliman is the headquarters of ABS-CBN Corporation.

Quezon City is known as the "Entertainment Capital of the Philippines" and the "City of Stars", since it is where major studios located and most Filipino actors and actresses reside. To support the film industry, the city established the Quezon City Film Development Commission (QCFDC). The city also holds its own film festival, the QCinema International Film Festival, every October or November and showcases local and international films, documentaries, and short films, and gives grants to their creators.

Quezon City is home to the Philippines' major broadcasting networks. There are 11 local television networks, 6 cable TV, 7 AM radio stations, and 4 FM radio stations in the city. Major media companies in the Philippines such as GMA Network and ABS-CBN Corporation have their headquarters in the city. From 1992 to 2013, TV5 Network had its headquarters in the city. It moved to Mandaluyong in 2013 although TV5's former Novaliches headquarters still serves as its alternate studios. Its transmitter in Novaliches is still being used and operated by the network. State-owned media and television network such as IBC, PTV and RPN also have their headquarters in the city.

Minor/religious broadcasting companies in the city include CEBSI (formerly CBS), DZCE-TV, and EBC (Net 25), which are all affiliated with Iglesia ni Cristo. UNTV is another minor/religious broadcasting network affiliated with Members Church of God International. DZRV-AM, owned and operated by the Archdiocese of Manila and located in the Diocese of Cubao, has a studio in the city. Major broadcasting facilities in the city include the Net 25 Tower, the tallest communications tower in the Philippines standing at 907 feet (276 m), RPN's South Tower (492 ft (150.0 m)), GMA's Tower of Power (777 ft (236.8 m)), IBC's Central Tower (650 ft (198.1 m)), TV5's Satellite Tower (656.2 ft (200.0 m)), ABS-CBN's/AMBS' Millennium Transmitter (720 ft (219.5 m)), the ABS-CBN's ELJ Communications Center, GMA's GMA Network Center, TV5's alternate studios in Novaliches, and the UNTV Broadcast Center. Formerly, the Broadcast City in Matandang Balara was once home to Banahaw Broadcasting Corporation (BBC), Radio Philippines Network (RPN), and Intercontinental Broadcasting Corporation (IBC).

=== Tourism and dining ===
In 2025, the Michelin Guide for Manila and Cebu awarded a Bib Gourmand to Morning Sun Eatery, a carinderia in Project 4. The guide recognizes establishments with this distinction for offering good food at moderate prices.

== Government ==
=== Local government ===
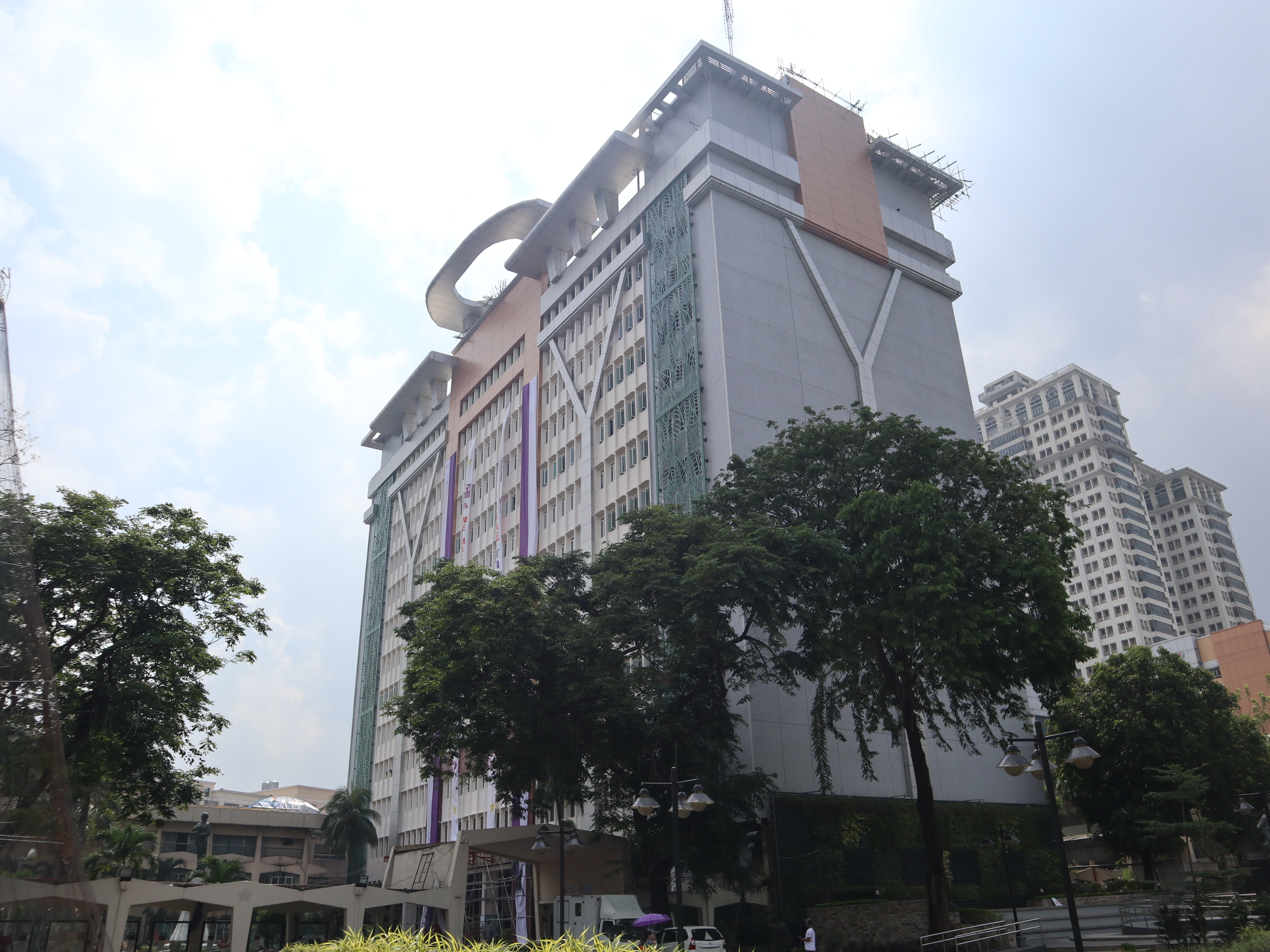
Quezon City Hall, the seat of city government

Quezon City is classified as a Special City (according to its income) and a highly urbanized city (HUC). The mayor is the chief executive, and is a member of the Metro Manila Council. The mayor is assisted by the vice mayor, who serves as the presiding officer of the 38-member Quezon City Council. The members of the City Council are elected as representatives of the six councilor districts within the city, and the municipal presidents of the Liga ng mga Barangay and Sangguniang Kabataan.

The current mayor is Maria Josefina "Joy" Belmonte, who previously served as the city's vice mayor and is the daughter of former mayor and House Speaker Feliciano Belmonte Jr. The current vice mayor is Gian Sotto, a former city councilor and the son of actors Tito Sotto (also a former Senate President and city vice mayor) and Helen Gamboa. The mayor and the vice mayor are term-limited by up to 3 terms, with each term lasting for 3 years. The mayor serves as the executive head that leads all the city's department in executing city ordinances and improving public services. The vice mayor, who serves a concurrent position as the presiding officer of the City Council, oversees the formulation and enactment passed by the council.

From its creation in 1939 up until 1959, the mayors of Quezon City were appointed by the President. Norberto S. Amoranto was the first elected mayor, and was the city's longest-serving mayor, having served that position for 22 years.

The city observes regular and non-working holidays of the Philippines. The Quezon City Day, which was celebrated annually on August 19 by both Quezon City and Quezon Province to commemorate the birth of Manuel L. Quezon, is a special non-working holiday.

=== National government ===
The DILG-NAPOLCOM Center (right) is the headquarters of the Department of the Interior and Local Government.

As the former capital, the city is the home to numerous government departments, agencies and institutions. The House of Representatives of the Philippines (Lower House), as well as the Departments of Agrarian Reform, Agriculture, Environment and Natural Resources, Human Settlements and Urban Development, Information and Communications Technology, Interior and Local Government, National Defense, and Social Welfare and Development calls the city home. Independent constitutional bodies such as the Commission on Audit and the Office of the Ombudsman, as well as special courts such as the Court of Tax Appeals and the Sandiganbayan are located in the city.

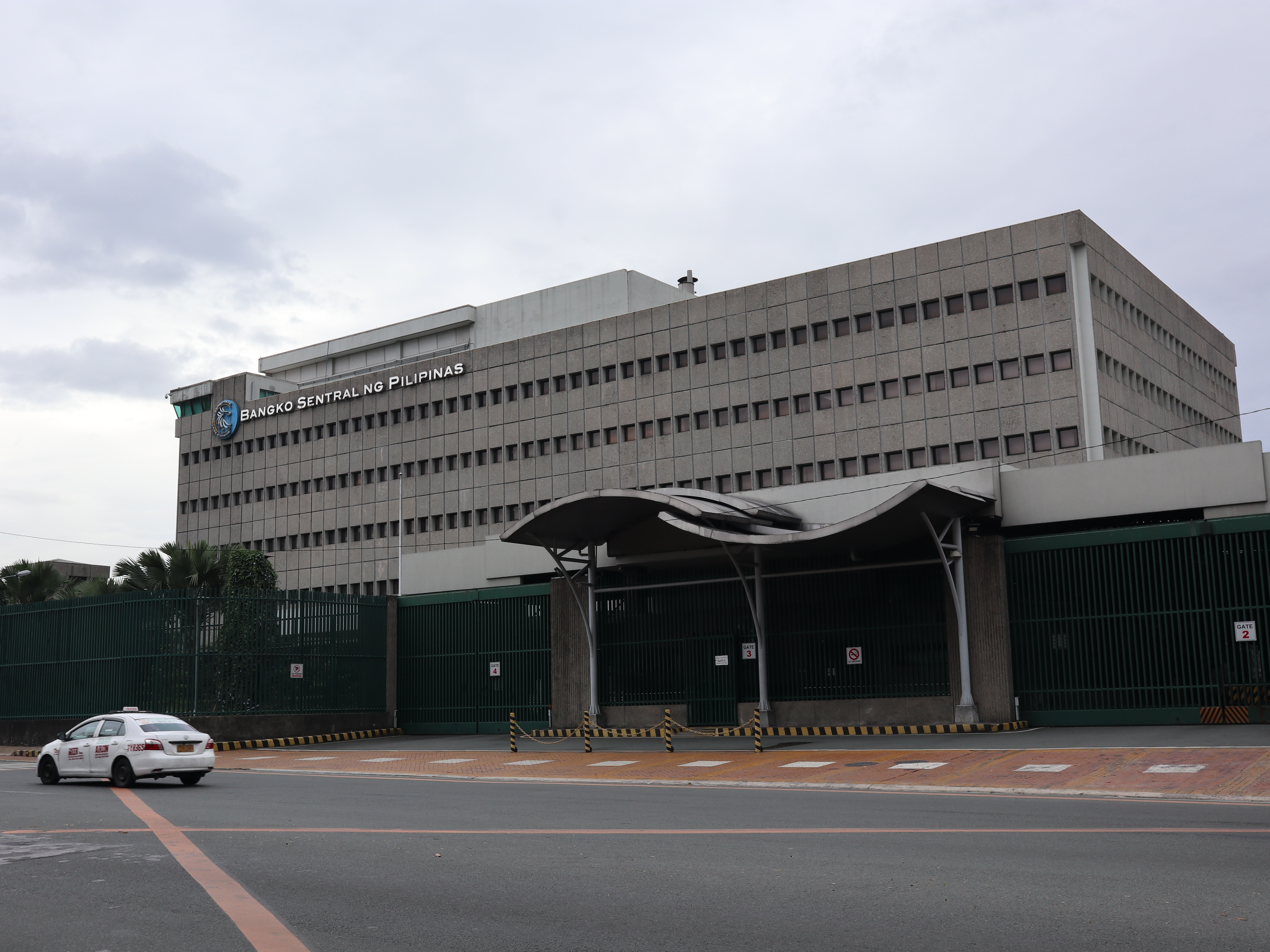
BSP Security Plant Complex along East Avenue

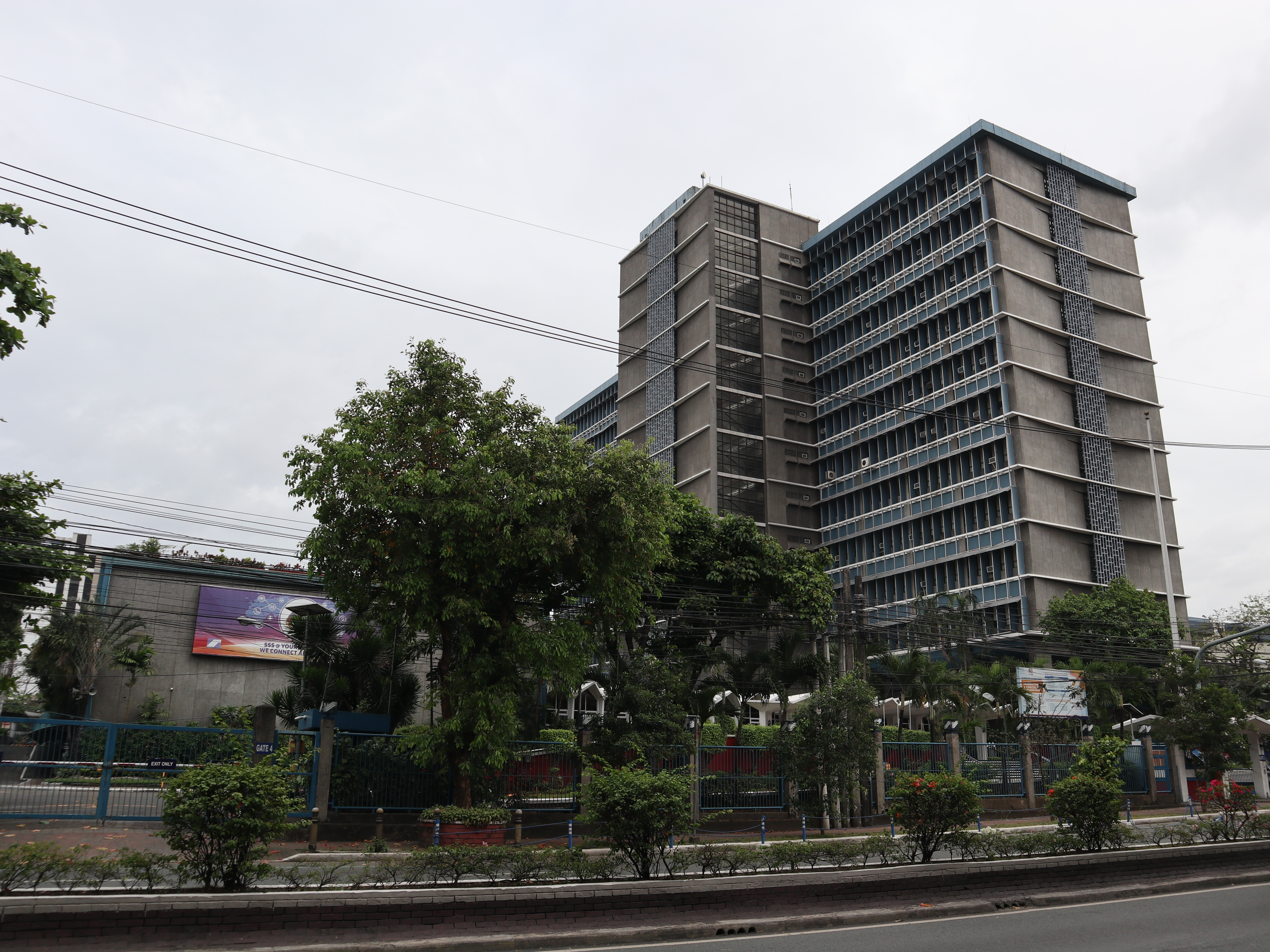
Main office of the Social Security System

There are two National Government Centers (NGC) in the city. The first National Government Center is located at Diliman Quadrangle, which is bounded by the North, South, East, and West Avenues. The proposed Capitol Building of the Philippines is supposed to rise at the site of the Quezon Memorial Circle, while the Executive Mansion was planned to be constructed at the present-day Veterans Memorial Medical Center (VMMC) and the Supreme Court was supposed to rise at the present-day East Avenue Medical Center (EAMC). This is where the main offices of the Departments of Agrarian Reform, Agriculture, Environment and Natural Resources, Human Settlements and Urban Development (including the National Housing Authority (Philippines)), and the Interior and Local Government are located. Other government agencies located within the city are the Bureau of Internal Revenue, BSP Security Plant Complex, Land Registration Authority, Land Transportation Office, National Power Corporation (NAPOCOR/NPC), National Transmission Corporation (TransCo), Philippine Atmospheric, Geophysical and Astronomical Services Administration (PAGASA), Philippine Space Agency (PhilSA), Philippine Statistics Authority (PSA), and the Social Security System (SSS).

The second National Government Center is located along Commonwealth Avenue, Batasan Hills. It is where the Batasang Pambansa Complex is located, whose site is supposed to be the national civic center and the focal point of the 1949 Master Plan. The Commission on Audit (COA), Public Attorney's Office (PAO) and the Sandiganbayan are located here.

== Sports ==
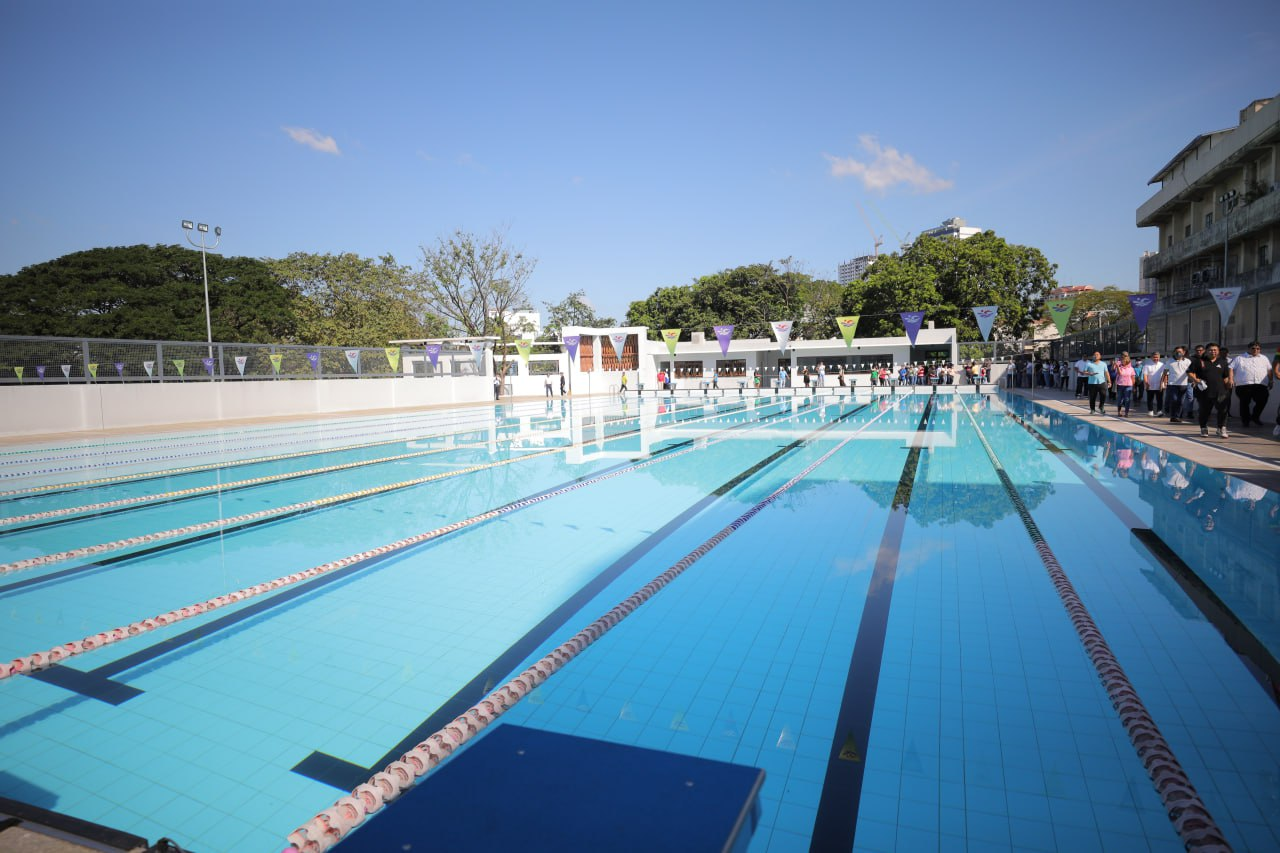
Swimming pool at Amoranto Sports Complex

Sports in Quezon City have a long and distinguished history. Quezon City is the home to notable sporting and recreational venues such as the Amoranto Sports Complex, Quezon City Sports Club and the Smart Araneta Coliseum. The prominent boxing fight between Muhammad Ali and Joe Frazier, which was known as Thrilla in Manila" was held at the Araneta Coliseum. It was renamed as the "Philippine Coliseum" for the event and the match was watched by over 1 billion viewers worldwide. The city is also home to venues used during the 1981, 1991, 2005, and 2019 editions of the Southeast Asian Games.

The Araneta Coliseum has hosted numerous sporting events, including the 1978 and 2023 editions of the FIBA Basketball World Cup, as well as multiple games in the Philippine Basketball Association.

Basketball is very prominent in the country. The city is home to the Quezon City Toda Aksyon, a men's professional basketball team that joined the Maharlika Pilipinas Basketball League in 2018. Most barangays around the city have a basketball court (or at least a makeshift basketball court), with court markings drawn on the streets. Larger barangays have covered courts where inter-barangay leagues are held every summer.

Quezon City is also notable for its golf courses, such as the Veterans Memorial Golf Club and Camp Aguinaldo Golf Club, which operates on golf-courses owned by the national government. The Capitol Hills Golf & Country Club in Matandang Balara is a privately owned exclusive 18-hole golf course situated at the hills overlooking Marikina Valley. In the early days after the creation of the city, Greenhills was considered as part of it along with Wack Wack Golf and Country Club, but the golf course was reverted to Mandaluyong.

== Healthcare ==
The Quezon City Health Department is responsible for the public health of the city. Its headquarters is located at the Batasan Social Hygiene Clinic Building along IBP Road, Batasan Hills. There are 60 government and privately owned hospitals in the city. At present, there are three city-owned and controlled hospitals: the Quezon City General Hospital in Bahay Toro (Project 8), Novaliches District Hospital in San Bartolome, Novaliches and the Rosario Maclang Bautista General Hospital in Batasan Hills. Another city-owned hospital, the Visayas Avenue Medical Center is currently under-construction.

St. Luke's Medical Center – Quezon City (SLMC) is regarded as one of the best private hospitals in the country.

There are several hospitals operated by the national government such as the East Avenue Medical Center (EAMC), Quirino Memorial Medical Center and the 55-hectare (140-acre) Veterans Memorial Medical Center (VMMC), which is operated by the Department of National Defense. The national government also operates several specialty hospitals in the city such as the Lung Center of the Philippines, National Kidney and Transplant Institute (NKTI), Philippine Heart Center and the Philippine Orthopedic Center. There are two government-owned children's hospital in the city: the Philippine Children's Medical Center along Quezon Avenue, and the National Children's Hospital in E. Rodriguez Sr. Avenue. The Armed Forces of the Philippines operates the V. Luna General Hospital (AFP Medical Center).

The city's healthcare is also provided by non-profit corporations, such as the Quezon Institute. There are numerous privately owned hospitals in the city, such as the Ace Medical Center, Bernardino General Hospital, Capitol Medical Center, Commonwealth Hospital and Medical Center, De Los Santos Medical Center, Diliman Doctor's Hospital, the Far Eastern University – Nicanor Reyes Medical Foundation Medical Center, J. P. Sioson General Hospital, St. Luke's Medical Center – Quezon City, UERM Memorial Hospital, United Doctors Medical Center, Villarosa Hospital and the World Citi Medical Center.

== Education ==
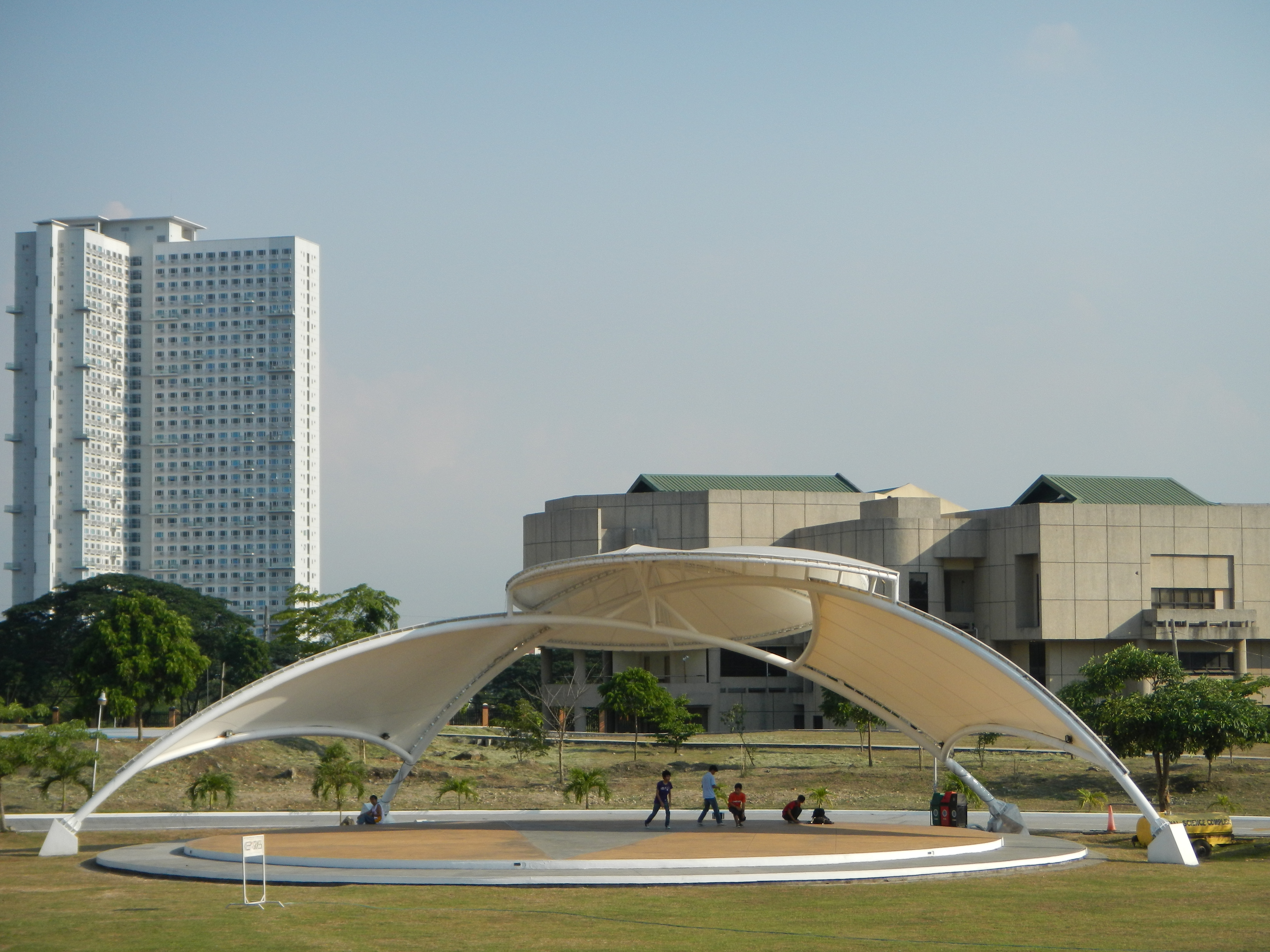
The National Science Complex (NSC) within the University of the Philippines Diliman

The Schools Divisions Office of Quezon City (SDO QC) oversees the 97 public elementary schools and 46 public high schools within the city. The number of students enrolled in public schools across the city has increased over time, from an initial population of 20,593 elementary pupils and 310 high school students in 1950 to 258,201 elementary pupils and 143,462 high school students in the 2013–14 school year. With its large student population, Quezon City has the greatest number of public schools in the Philippines. As of 2015, five of the city's elementary schools and four of its high schools are among the 15 most populous public schools in the Philippines. The Quezon City Science High School (QueSci) was designated as the Regional Science High School for the National Capital Region since 1998. The city is the home of the Philippine Science High School, the top science school in the Philippines operated by the Department of Science and Technology.

The Quezon City Science Interactive Center is regarded as the first of its kind science interactive center in the Philippines. The Quezon City Public Library (QCPL) operates 20 branches throughout the city, with its Main Library located within the Quezon City Hall Complex.

=== Higher education ===
Ateneo de Manila University, regarded as one of the best private universities in the Philippines

Quezon City, along with Manila, is the center for education in the Philippines. There are two state universities within the city limits: the University of the Philippines Diliman (UPD) and the Quezon City branch campus of the Polytechnic University of the Philippines. The city-run Quezon City University (QCU) has established three campuses around the city: San Bartolome, San Francisco, and Batasan Hills.

Private universities include the AMA Computer University, Central Colleges of the Philippines (CCP), FEU Diliman, Kalayaan College, National College of Business and Arts (NCBA), the Technological Institute of the Philippines (TIP).

Quezon City hosts prestigious Catholic educational institutions such as the Ateneo de Manila University (AdMU), Immaculate Heart of Mary College, St. Paul University Quezon City, Saint Pedro Poveda College, Siena College of Quezon City and the UST Angelicum College. It is also the home to other sectarian colleges and universities such as the Evangelical Grace Christian College, Episcopalian-run Trinity University of Asia, and the Iglesia ni Cristo founded New Era University (NEU).

The presence of medical schools has made Quezon City a center of healthcare and medical education. These include FEU Nicanor Reyes Medical Foundation, St. Luke's College of Medicine, Capitol Medical Center Colleges, and the University of the East Ramon Magsaysay Memorial Medical Center (UERMMMC).

== Transportation ==
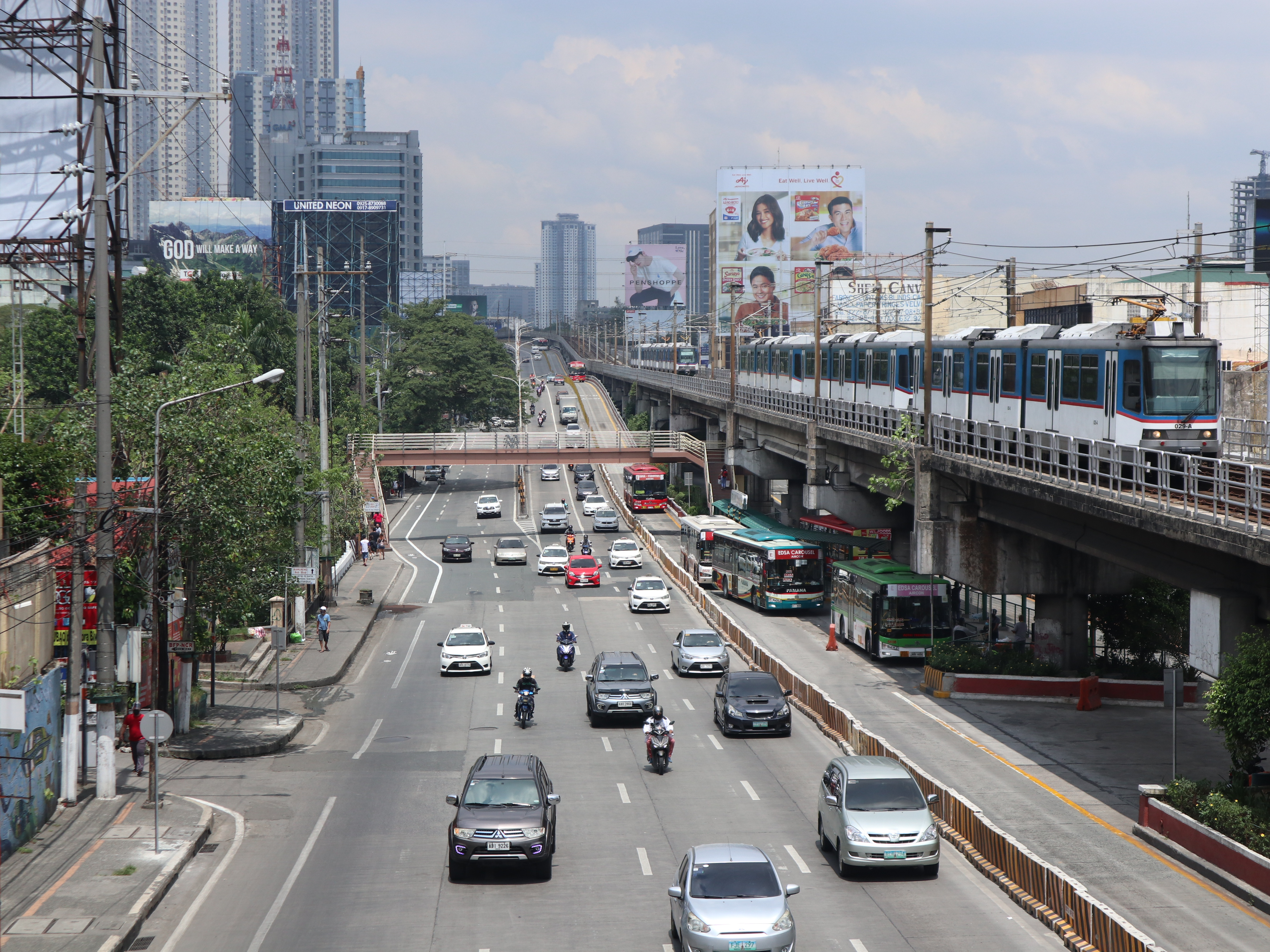
EDSA near GMA–Kamuning station

Transportation in the city is purely land based. As of 2006, the MMDA Traffic Operation Center revealed that the most dominant type of transport in the city is private transportation, accounting for 82.49% of the total volume, while public transport such as buses, and jeepneys and taxis make up 13.72%, followed by industrial and commercial vehicles (such as trucks and vans) at 3.79%. The Metro Manila Skyway is the only elevated expressway passing through Quezon City, serving as a tolled connector between the North and South Luzon Expressways. The proposed Southeast Metro Manila Expressway (C-6 Expressway) will connect parts of Quezon City and will have its northern terminus in Batasan Hills.

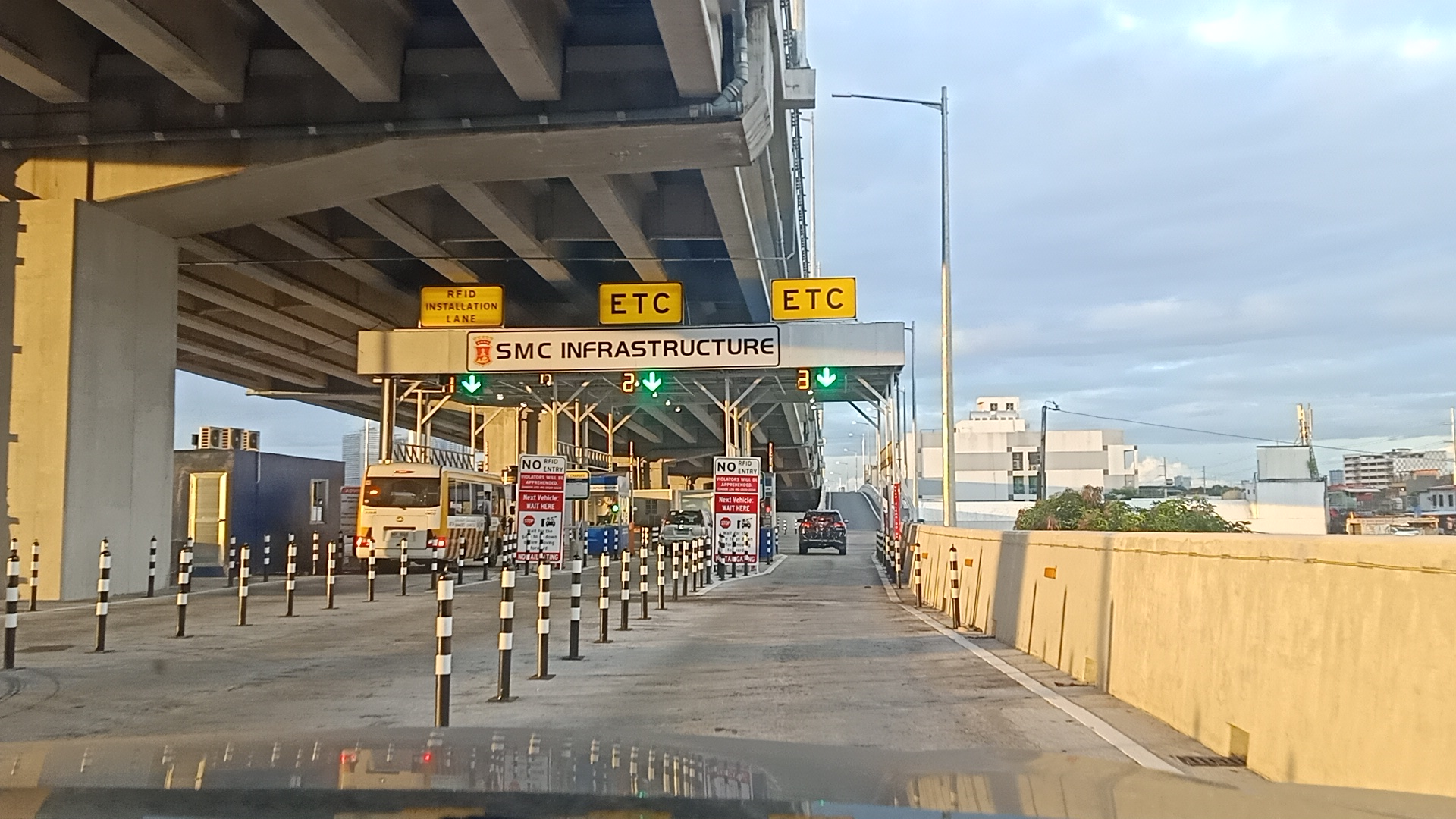
Quezon Avenue toll plaza of Metro Manila Skyway Stage 3 in Tatalon

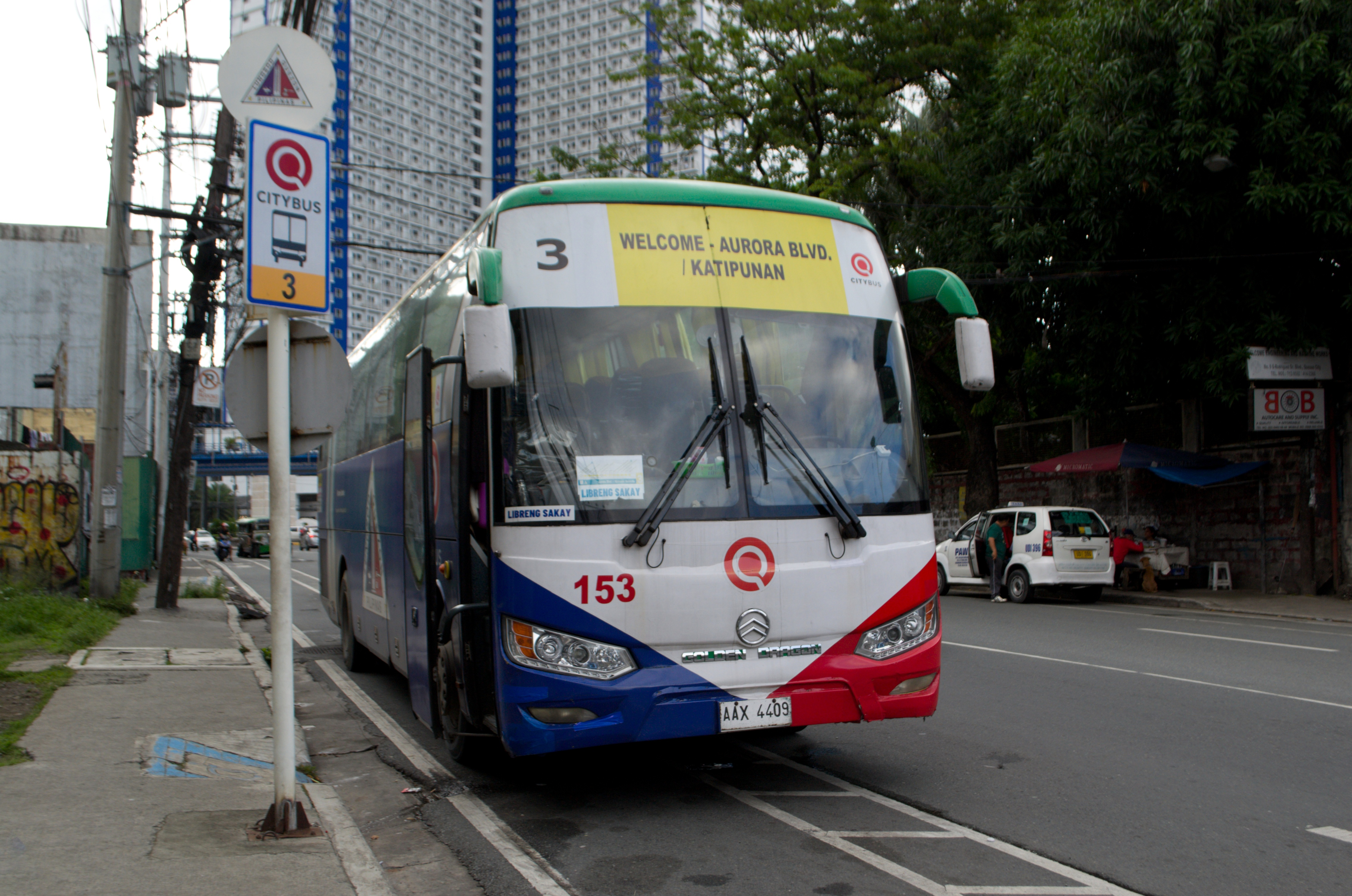
A bus of the Quezon City Bus Service near Welcome Rotonda

Modes of transportation in the city include the jeepney, city buses, and the UV Express, which follow fixed routes for a set price. All types of public road transport plying Quezon City are privately owned and operated under government-issued franchises. As of September 2020, the city has distributed 276 e-trikes in selected barangays in hopes of promoting energy efficient and clean technologies in the transport sector.

In 2021, the city government began operating eight city-wide bus routes under the Quezon City Bus Augmentation Program. The service is also referred to as City Bus and the QCity Bus Service. On April 28, 2023, the service was made permanent through Quezon City Ordinance No. SP-3184, series of 2023, or the "Q City Bus Ordinance", placing the program under the Quezon City Traffic and Transport Management Department.

=== Railway systems ===
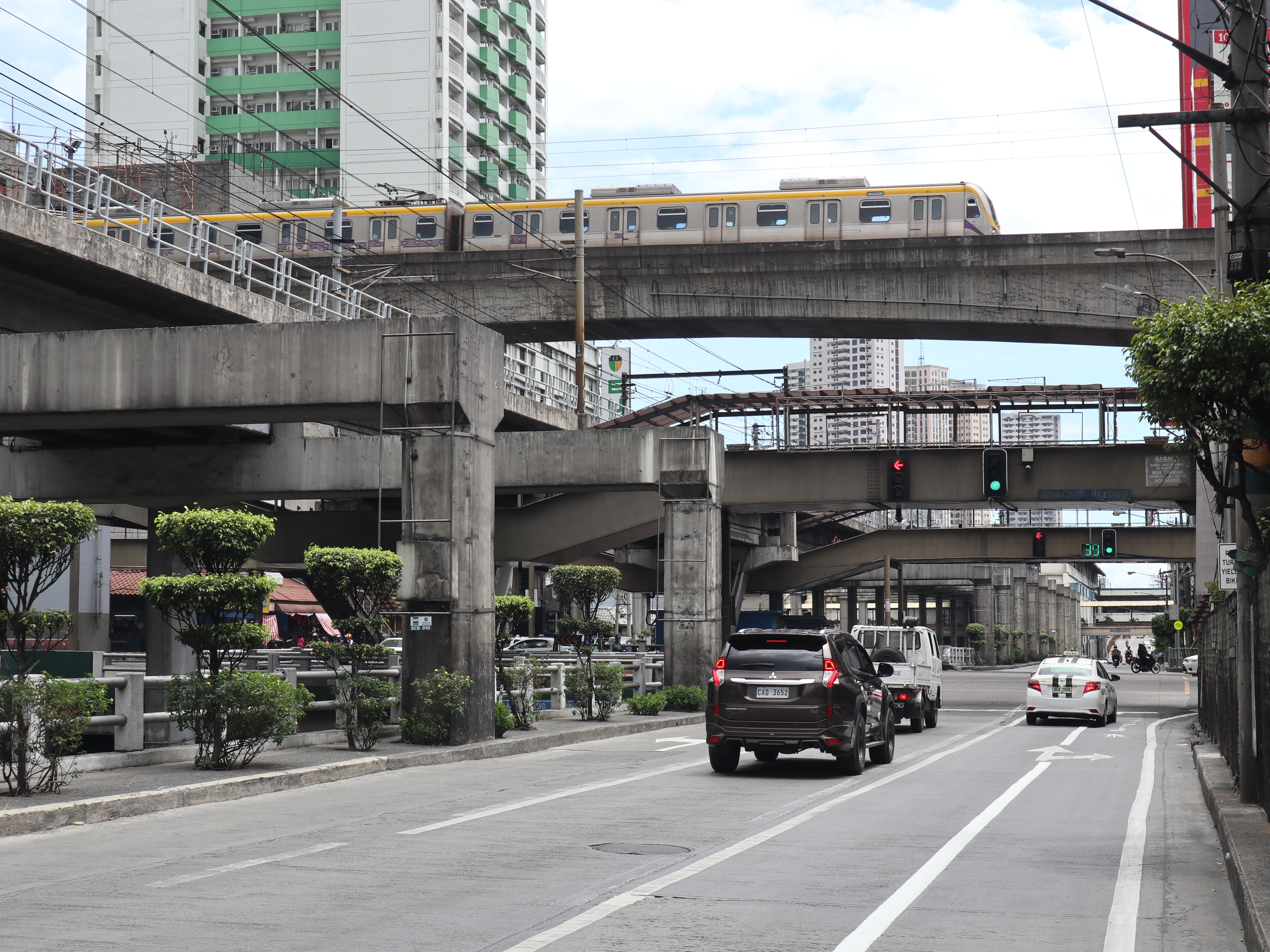
EDSA-Aurora Boulevard crossing, showing the viaducts of LRT-2 and MRT-3. An LRT-2 train is seen passing above.

Quezon City is served by LRT Line 1 (LRT-1), LRT Line 2 (LRT-2), and the MRT Line 3 (MRT-3). LRT-1 runs along the northern portion of EDSA (AH26/C-4), and ending at the North Triangle Common Station where it connects to Lines 1, 7, and the Subway. LRT-2 runs through Aurora Boulevard (R-6/N59/N180), connecting Quezon City to Manila, San Juan, Marikina, Pasig, Cainta and Antipolo. MRT-3 runs through EDSA (AH26/C-4), linking Quezon City to the cities of Mandaluyong, Makati and Pasay. Railway lines that are under-construction within the city are the MRT Line 4 (MRT-4), MRT Line 7 (MRT-7) and the Metro Manila Subway (MMS). The North Triangle Common Station, which will link Lines 1, 3, 7, and the Metro Manila Subway, is currently under construction at the intersection of EDSA and North Avenue.

=== Air ===
The city is served by Ninoy Aquino International Airport to the south and Clark International Airport to the north. In the future, it will also be served by the upcoming New Manila International Airport located in the adjacent province of Bulacan. All are located outside the city limits.

== Utilities ==
=== Water supply, power and telecommunications ===
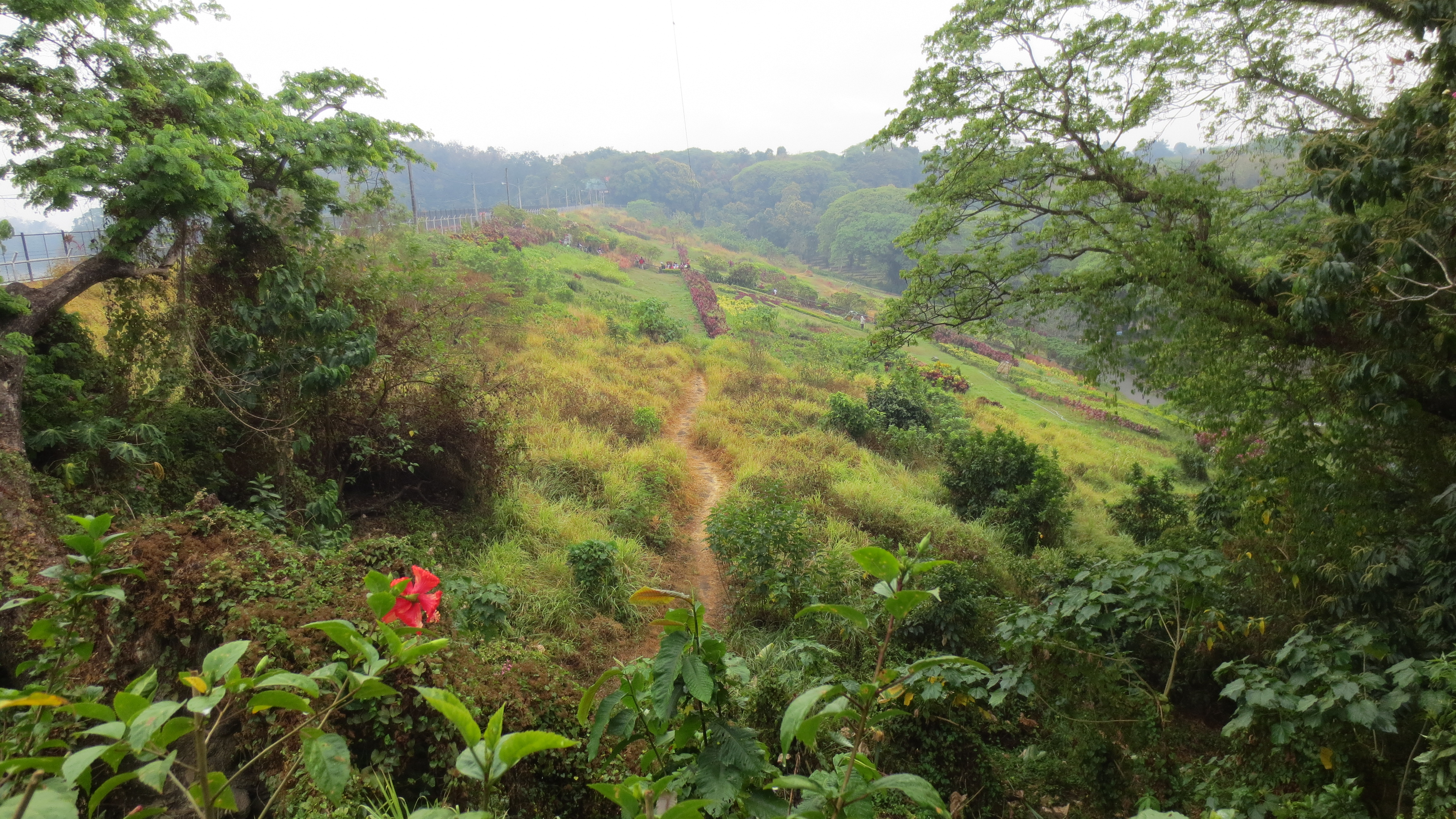
La Mesa Ecopark in the La Mesa Watershed Reservation, which also contains the La Mesa Dam and Reservoir

Water services are provided by Maynilad Water Services for the west and northern part of the city and Manila Water for the southeastern part. The Novaliches-Balara Aqueduct 4 (NBAQ4), constructed by Manila Water, is the largest water supply infrastructure project in Metro Manila. NBAQ4 measures 7.3 kilometers (4.5 mi) long and 3.1 meters (10 ft) in diameter, and the aqueduct has a capacity of 1,000 MLD (millions of liters per day) or 1,000 kL (35,000 cu ft) per day. The La Mesa Dam and Reservoir is situated at the northernmost part of the city, covering an area of more than 27 square kilometers (10 sq mi). The reservoir contains the La Mesa Watershed and Ecopark.

Electric services are provided by Meralco, the sole electric power distributor in Metro Manila. As of December 2009, Meralco has a total of 512,255 customers within the city: 461,645 (90.1%) residential, 49,082 (9.6%) commercial, and 1,110 (0.2%) industrial. Street lights have 418 accounts. As of October 2019, the city has 26,776 LED streetlights.

With the liberalization of the telecommunications industry, the city benefitted by having more firms that offer telephone and internet services. Notable telecommunication companies operating in the city include PLDT/Smart Communications, Globe Telecom, Dito Telecommunity, Multimedia and Eastern Telecommunications Services, Inc.

=== Domestic solid waste ===
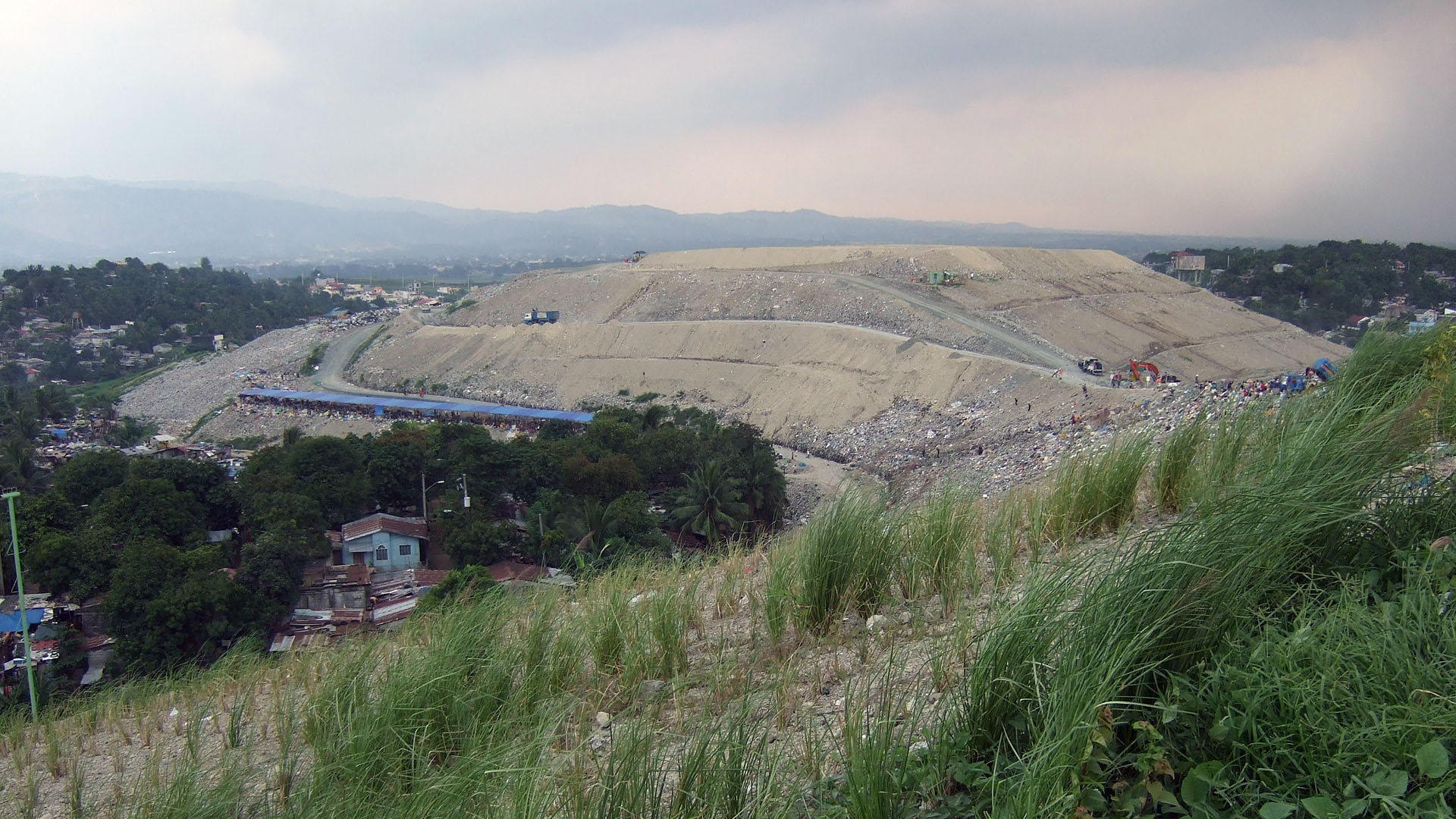
The Payatas dumpsite in 2007. It was permanently closed in 2017.

The Payatas dumpsite was the largest landfill in Metro Manila. It was established in the 1970s on the barangay of the same, located at the northeast part of Quezon City. The area where the landfill is situated used to be a ravine surrounded by farming villages and rice paddies. When the Smokey Mountain in Tondo, Manila, was closed in 1995, people who resided and worked as scavengers there migrated to the Payatas dumpsite, establishing a squatter colony around the dumpsite. On July 10, 2000, the deadly Payatas landslide occurred, when large heaps of garbage dump collapsed on a nearby informal settlers' community and burned, killing between 218 and 700 people. Following the tragic collapse, Republic Act No. 9003 or the Ecological Solid Waste Management Act of 2000 was passed, which mandates the closure of open dumpsites in the Philippines by 2004 and controlled dumpsites by 2006. In 2004, the Payatas dumpsite was reconfigured as a controlled disposal facility but it was closed down in December 2010. A separate dumpsite was established near the old open dumpsite in January 2011. The newer dumpsite closed in December 2017.

== Sister cities ==
=== Asia ===
- Alicia, Isabela, Philippines
- Banaybanay, Davao Oriental, Philippines
- Calasiao, Pangasinan, Philippines
- Chiba, Japan
- Cotabato City, Philippines
- Davao City, Philippines
- General Santos, Philippines
- Hagåtña, Guam
- Iloilo City, Philippines
- La Trinidad, Benguet, Philippines
- Naga, Camarines Sur, Philippines
- Puerto Princesa, Philippines
- Pura, Tarlac, Philippines
- Roxas City, Philippines
- Sadanga, Mountain Province, Philippines
- Shenyang, China
- Taipei, Taiwan
- Wao, Lanao del Sur, Philippines
- Yangon, Myanmar
- Yuci District, China

=== Americas ===
- Caracas, Venezuela
- Daly City, California, United States
- Fort Walton Beach, Florida, United States
- Kenosha, Wisconsin, United States
- Maui County, Hawaii, United States
- New Westminster, Canada
- Salt Lake City, Utah, United States

== International relations ==
=== Affiliates ===
- Osaka, Japan (2018)
- Pyeongchang County, South Korea

=== Consulates ===
Country	Type	Ref.
Cyprus	Consular agency	

== In art ==
- Cubao Landscape, by Fernando Amorsolo, 1924.
- Novaliches Landscape, by Fernando Amorsolo, 1925.
- Landscape (The University of the Philippines Campus Site in Diliman), by Dominador Castañeda, 1941.
- Mira Nila, by Macario Vitalis, 1963.

== See also ==
- Capital of the Philippines

Preceded by Manila	Capital of the Philippines; 1948–1976	Succeeded by Manila
