= List of barangays in Quezon City =

Barangays in Quezon City, Metro Manila, Philippines

Left: Political map displaying the boundaries of the barangays of Quezon City. Right: The six legislative districts of Quezon City.

Quezon City, the most populous city in the Philippines, is politically subdivided into 142 barangays. All of Quezon City's barangays are classified as urban.

== Barangays by district ==
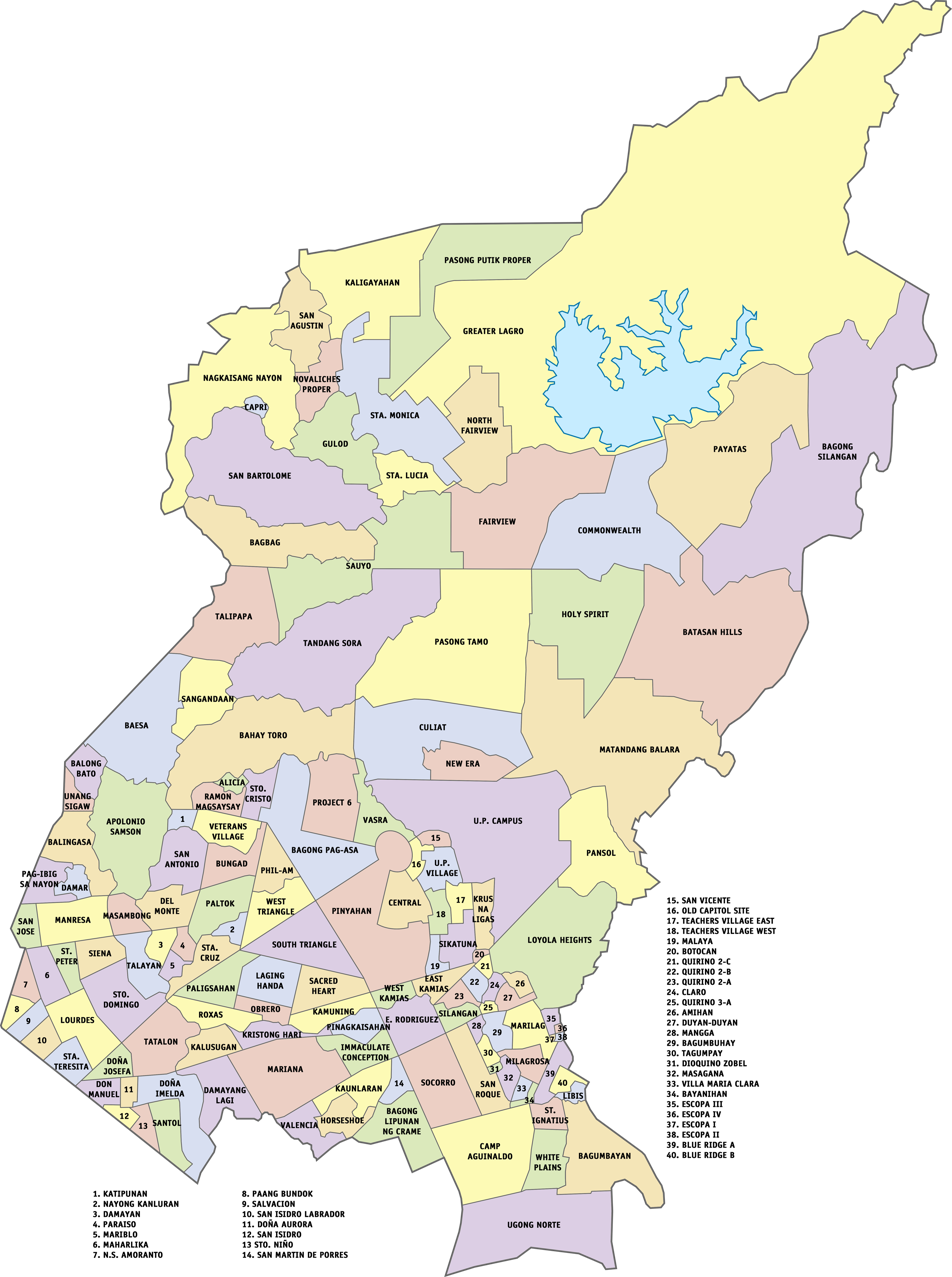
Political map of Quezon City. c. 2012

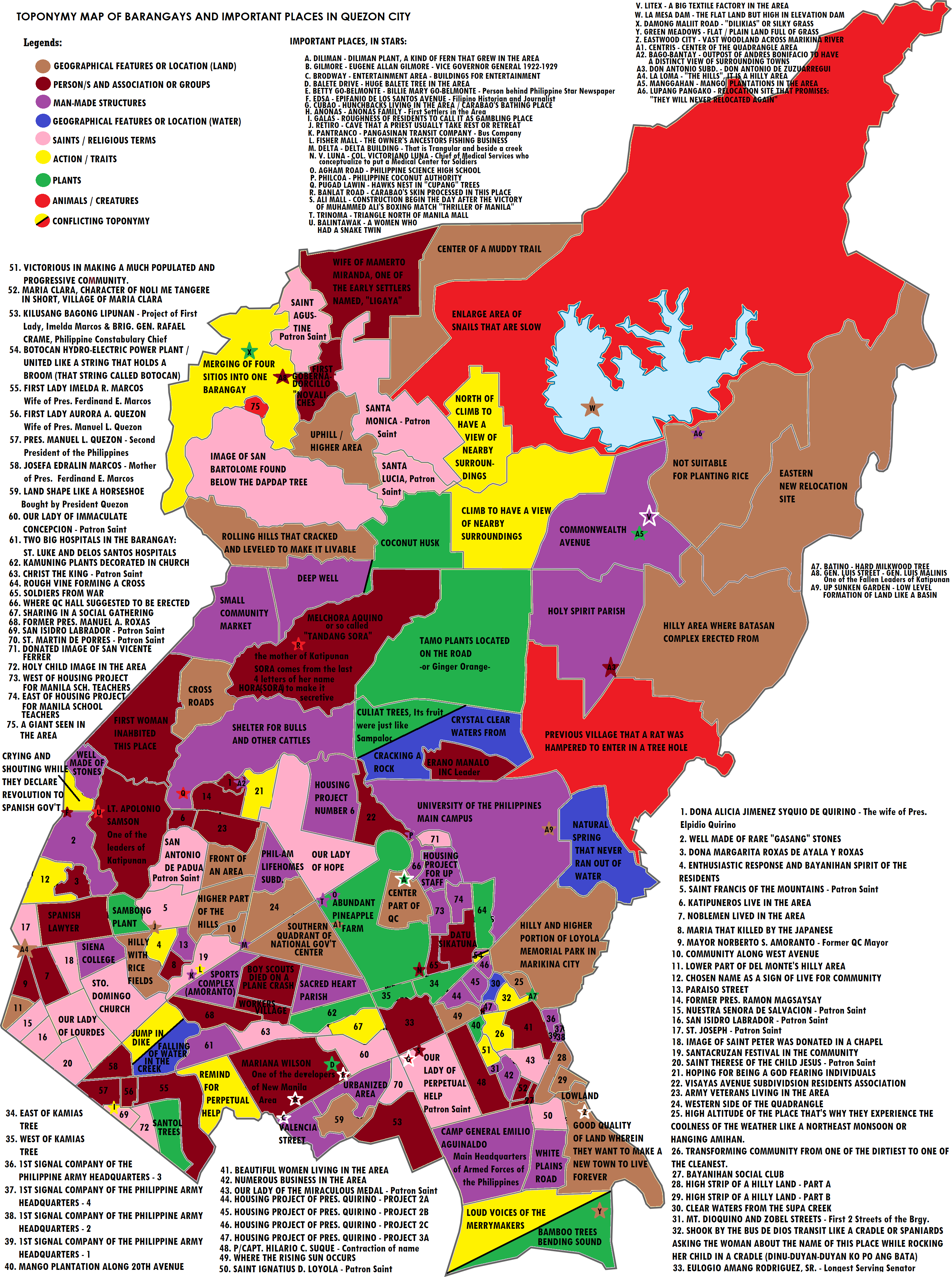
Map of Quezon City showing toponymy of barangays and other places

=== District 1 ===
District 1
Barangay	Alternate Name
Alicia	Bago Bantay
Bagong Pag-asa	North-EDSA, Diliman (southern part), Triangle Park (southern triangle)
Bahay Toro	Project 8, Pugadlawin
Balingasa	Balintawak, Cloverleaf
Bungad	Project 7
Damar	Balintawak
Damayan	San Francisco del Monte, Frisco
Del Monte	San Francisco del Monte, Frisco
Katipunan	Muñoz
Lourdes	Santa Mesa Heights
Maharlika	Santa Mesa Heights
Manresa	Balintawak, San Francisco del Monte, Frisco
Mariblo	San Francisco del Monte, Frisco
Masambong	San Francisco del Monte, Frisco
N.S. Amoranto (Gintong Silahis)	La Loma
Nayong Kanluran	West Avenue
Paang Bundok	La Loma
Pag-ibig sa Nayon	Balintawak
Paltok	San Francisco del Monte, Frisco
Paraiso	San Francisco del Monte, Frisco
Phil-Am	West Triangle, Diliman
Project 6	Diliman (southeast quarter), Triangle Park (southern half)
Ramon Magsaysay	Bago Bantay, Muñoz
Saint Peter	Santa Mesa Heights
Salvacion	La Loma
San Antonio	San Francisco del Monte, Frisco
San Isidro Labrador	La Loma
San Jose	La Loma
Santa Cruz	Pantranco, Heroes Hill
Santa Teresita	Santa Mesa Heights
Sto. Cristo	Bago Bantay
Santo Domingo (Matalahib)	Matalahib, Santa Mesa Heights
Siena	Santa Mesa Heights
Talayan	San Francisco del Monte, Frisco
Vasra	Diliman (mostly)
Veterans Village	Project 7, Muñoz
West Triangle	Diliman

=== District 2 ===
District 2
Barangay	Alternate Name
Bagong Silangan	Payatas
Batasan Hills	Constitution Hills
Commonwealth	Manggahan, Litex
Holy Spirit	Don Antonio, Luzon
Payatas	Litex

=== District 3 ===
District 3
Barangay	Alternate Name
Amihan	Project 3
Bagumbayan	Eastwood, Acropolis, Citybank, Gentex, Libis
Bagumbuhay	Project 4
Bayanihan	Project 4
Blue Ridge A	Project 4
Blue Ridge B	Project 4
Camp Aguinaldo	Armed Forces (AFP), Murphy
Claro (Quirino 3-B)	Project 3
Dioquino Zobel	Project 4
Duyan-duyan	Project 3
E. Rodriguez	Project 5, Cubao
East Kamias	Project 1, Kamias
Escopa I	Project 4
Escopa II	Project 4
Escopa III	Project 4
Escopa IV	Project 4
Libis	Camp Atienza, Eastwood
Loyola Heights	Katipunan
Mangga	Cubao, Anonas, T.I.P.
Marilag	Project 4
Masagana	Project 4, Jacobo Zobel
Matandang Balara	Old Balara, Luzon, Tandang Sora
Milagrosa	Project 4
Pansol	Balara, Katipunan
Quirino 2-A	Project 2, Anonas
Quirino 2-B	Project 2, Anonas
Quirino 2-C	Project 2, Anonas
Quirino 3-A	Project 3, Anonas
St. Ignatius	Project 4, Katipunan
San Roque	Cubao
Silangan	Cubao
Socorro	Cubao, Araneta City
Tagumpay	Project 4
Ugong Norte	Green Meadows, Corinthian, Ortigas
Villa Maria Clara	Project 4
West Kamias	Project 5, Kamias
White Plains	Camp Aguinaldo, Katipunan

=== District 4 ===
District 4
Barangay	Alternate Name
Bagong Lipunan ng Crame	Camp Crame, Philippine National Police (PNP)
Botocan	Diliman (northern half)
Central	Diliman, Quezon City Hall
Damayang Lagi	New Manila
Don Manuel	Galas
Doña Aurora	Galas
Doña Imelda	Galas, Sta. Mesa (border with City of Manila)
Doña Josefa	Galas
Horseshoe	New Manila
Immaculate Concepcion	Cubao
Kalusugan	St. Luke's
Kamuning	Project 1, Scout Area
Kaunlaran	Cubao
Kristong Hari	E. Rodriguez, New Manila
Krus na Ligas	Diliman
Laging Handa	Diliman, Scout Area
Malaya	Diliman
Mariana	New Manila
Obrero	Diliman (northern half), Project 1 (southern half)
Old Capitol Site	Diliman
Paligsahan	Diliman, Scout Area
Pinagkaisahan	Cubao
Pinyahan	Diliman, Triangle Park (northern triangle)
Roxas	Project 1
Sacred Heart	Kamuning, Diliman, Scout Area
San Isidro Galas	Galas
San Martin de Porres	Cubao, Arayat
San Vicente	Diliman, UP Bliss
Santol	Galas
Sikatuna Village	Diliman
South Triangle	Diliman, Scout Area
Santo Niño	Galas
Tatalon	Sanctuarium, Araneta Avenue
Teacher's Village East	Diliman
Teacher's Village West	Diliman
U.P. Campus	Diliman
U.P. Village	Diliman
Valencia	New Manila, Gilmore Ave., N. Domingo Ave.

=== District 5 ===
District 5
Barangay	Alternate Name
Bagbag	Novaliches District, Sauyo
Capri	Novaliches District
Fairview	Novaliches District, La Mesa, West Fairview
Gulod	Novaliches District, Susano, Nitang, Forest Hills
Greater Lagro	Novaliches District, Lagro, Fairview
Kaligayahan	Novaliches District, Zabarte
Nagkaisang Nayon	Novaliches District, General Luis
North Fairview	Novaliches District
Novaliches Proper	Novaliches Bayan, Glori, Bayan
Pasong Putik Proper	Novaliches District, Maligaya Drive, Fairview
San Agustin	Novaliches District, Susano
San Bartolome	Novaliches District, Holy Cross
Sta. Lucia	Novaliches District, San Gabriel
Sta. Monica	Novaliches District

=== District 6 ===
District 6
Barangay	Alternate Name
Apolonio Samson	Balintawak, Kaingin, Kangkong
Baesa	Project 8, Novaliches District
Balon Bato	Balintawak
Culiat	Tandang Sora
New Era	Iglesia ni Cristo/Central, Tandang Sora
Pasong Tamo	Pingkian, Philand, Tandang Sora
Sangandaan	Project 8, Novaliches District
Sauyo	Novaliches District
Talipapa	Novaliches District
Tandang Sora	Banlat
Unang Sigaw	Balintawak, Cloverleaf

== See also ==
- List of barangays of Metro Manila
