= 2025 Quezon City floods =

Natural disaster in the Philippines

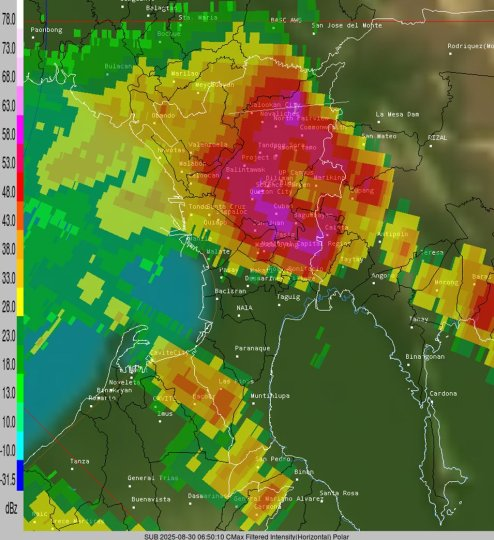
- Precipitation echoes on the Subic weather radar image taken on August 30, 2025 at 2:50pm.
- Cause: Heavy rain

Meteorological history
- Duration: August 30, 2025

Flood
- Max. rainfall: 121 mm (4.8 in)

Overall effects
- Areas affected: Quezon City and Nangka, Marikina

On August 30, 2025, severe thunderstorms caused heavy rainfall in Metro Manila causing flooding in parts of southern Quezon City.

== Flooding ==
On August 30, 2025, portions of Metro Manila experienced flooding with Quezon City and Nangka, Marikina noted to be most affected due to "heavy and intense" rainfall. PAGASA attributes the flooding to severe thunderstorms. The state weather bureau also has raised a thunderstorm advisories in nearby provinces aside from Metro Manila.

The Quezon City government reported flooding in 36 of its 142 barangays in districts 1, 3, 4. Flooding occurred in areas near creeks with alert lever 3 hoisted for San Juan River. However it also included areas not typically prone to flooding with the city government admitting that its drainage system was overwhelmed.

The rainfall was described to be "phenomenal" and even worse than precipitation caused by Typhoon Ketsana (Ondoy) of 2009. The PAGASA weather station at the Science Garden recorded a rainfall of 135.6 millimeters (5.34 in) between 8am of August 30 and the same time the next day. Most of the precipitation occurred from 2pm to 5pm with 116 mm (4.6 in) of rainfall described as "intense to torrential". The one-hour rainfall recorded during the 2025 floods was 121 mm (4.8 in) exceeding Ketsena's average of 90 mm/h (3.5 in/h)

== Reactions ==
The Quezon City government vowed the official adoption of a QC Drainage Masterplan "as the sole source of the designs and implementation guide for all flood control projects in the city, whether it be local or national".

The Makabayan bloc described the floods as disastrous but already expected. With the flooding happening during the August 2025 flood control projects controversy, Makabayan condemned corrupt officials and contractors for enriching themselves through anomalous flood control deals. They also underscored that national government's lack of coordination with local governments.
