= Bagong Pag-asa =

Barangay in Quezon City, Metro Manila, Philippines

Bagong Pag-asa Magsaysay District
- Barangay
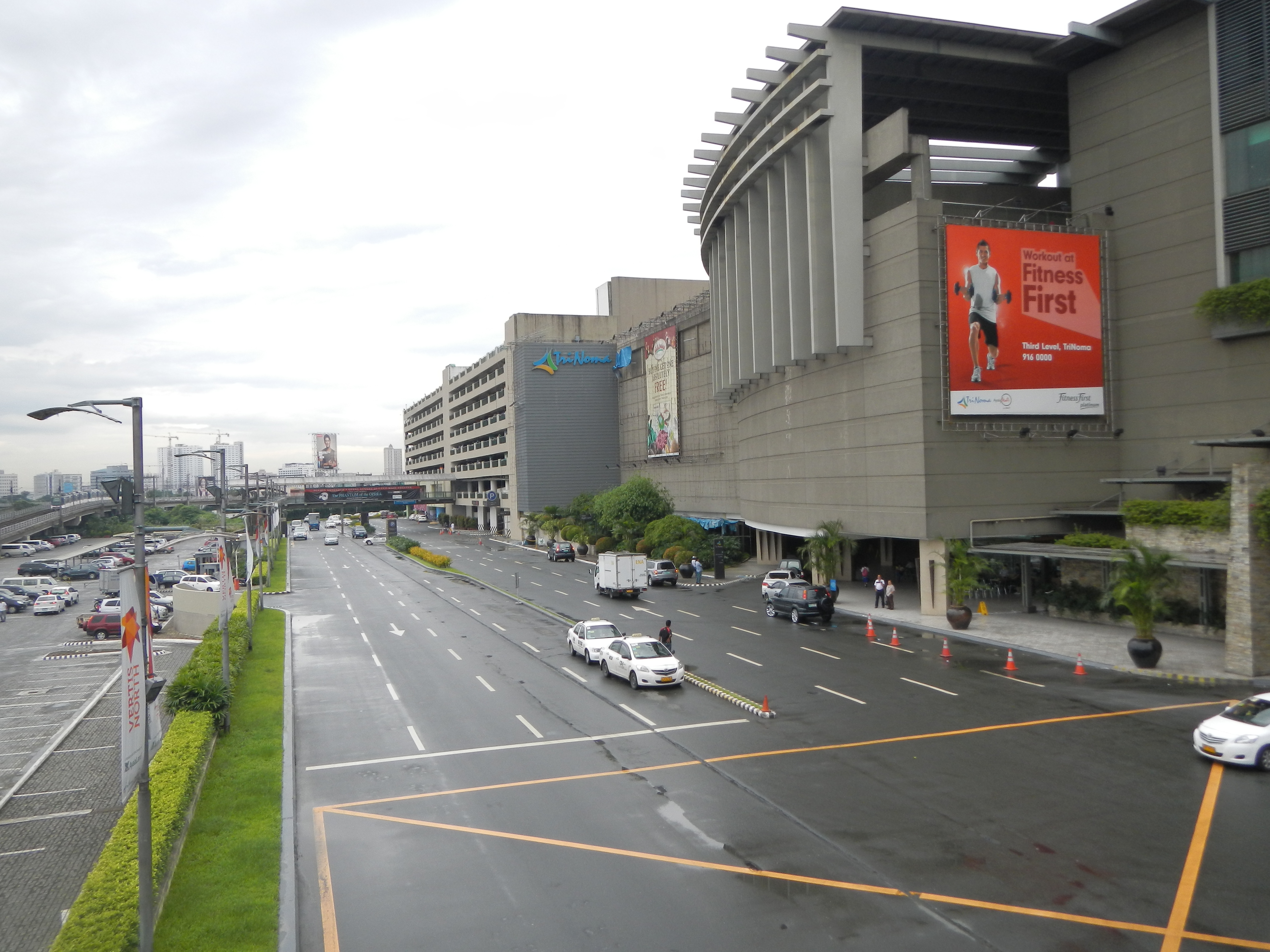
- Trinoma
- Interactive map of Bagong Pag-asa
- Coordinates: 14°39′44″N 121°1′59″E
- Country: Philippines
- Region: National Capital Region
- City: Quezon City
- District: 1st District of Quezon City
- Established: April 7, 1970

Government
  - Type: Barangay
  - Barangay Chairman: Franze Russele “Chinggay” O. Bilaos

Population (2020)
  - Total: 29,389
- Time zone: UTC+8 (PST)
- Zip Code: 1105
- Area code: 2
- PSGC: 137404009
- Website: Facebook

Bagong Pag-asa (lit. 'New Hope'), also known as the Magsaysay District, is an administrative division in eastern Metro Manila. It is an urban barangay of Quezon City with low-density housing and is known for its shopping malls, transport hubs and office buildings.

Neighboring barangays include Project 6 and Vasra in the northeast; Bahay Toro in the north; Pinyahan in the east; Veterans Village, Bungad and Sto. Cristo in the northwest; Phil-Am in the west; West Triangle in the southwest; and South Triangle in the south.

== History ==
The area now comprising the barangay was originally a cogon grassland interspersed rice paddies, bamboo groves, and fruit-bearing trees. This land was once part of the Diliman Estate, a 1,600-hectare (16km sq) estate in Caloocan owned by the Tuazon family, which was sold to the Philippine government in 1938. It was included in the newly-founded Quezon City in 1939.

=== New housing development ===
In 1954, the Social Welfare Administration (now the Department of Social Welfare and Development), offered informal settlers from Barrio Tatalon (now Barangay Tatalon) in Quezon City an opportunity for permanent residential housing in a new residential development north of the area. Some settlers did not move into the new development, and relocated instead to the areas around the University of the Philippines Diliman campus and other places in the city, while others moved to the Malate district of the City of Manila.

As army engineers, the Philippine Homesite and Housing Corporation, and other government entities implemented the relocation and settlement of the informal settlers, the development was named the Bago Bantay District or Magsaysay District. It eventually became known as Bagong Pag-asa, which is Filipino for "a new hope" as a way for its early residents to signify the hope for a better life. It was said to have originated from a speech of then-President Ramon Magsaysay, who was also responsible for the relocation program itself, as he was quoted for saying, "there is new hope" for the Philippines.

=== Barangay established ===
The residential development was incorporated as a barrio through Quezon City Ordinance No. 4386 series of 1960, which was approved on April 7, 1960, by Vice Mayor Vicente O. Novales. There was a lack of basic utilities at the time, resulting in drinking water having to be rationed by the city fire department, and its early pioneers had to walk through unpaved road to reach city transportation networks.

Barrio Bagong Pag-asa was later recognized as a barangay on June 25, 1975, through Executive Order No. 24 by then-Mayor Norberto S. Amoranto, which converted existing barrios into barangays. Its first barangay elections were held that same year.

== Landmarks ==
=== Triangle Park (North Triangle) corridor ===
TriNoma along with the entire Vertis North development of Ayala Malls, the Ninoy Aquino Parks and Wildlife Center and the PAGASA Garden are all found inside the Triangle Park.

=== Other notable landmarks ===
The SM North EDSA complex is predominantly located within the barangay, excluding The Annex which is under the jurisdiction of Barangay Sto. Cristo. It will be further expanded in size once the five Business Process Outsourcing and hotel towers are completed, replacing the former site of the Super Sale Club.

Bagong Lipunan Pag-asa Condominiums, an Urban Bliss site and Golden Acres (Home for the Aged), projects of former First Lady Imelda Romualdez-Marcos during her husband's presidency are both located behind the SM North EDSA complex.

=== Future development ===
Upon the completion of the Unified Grand Central Station, it will connect the existing stations of the LRT Line 1 and MRT Line 3 to the soon-to-be-completed MRT Line 7 and the planned Metro Manila Subway. The Quezon Avenue Station construction occupies a 1.8 hectares lot in Bagong Pag-asa and Pinyahan. The Metro Manila Subway Contract Package 102 costs P 21.2 billion of the Build Better More. It has at 2 underground stations at Quezon Avenue and East Avenue with a length of 3.2 km. The project commenced o May 2023 and is expected to be completed by December 2029.

== Barangay and Sangguniang Kabataan officials ==
=== Members of Sangguniang Barangay ===
Title	Name
Barangay Captain; Punong Barangay	Franze Russele “Chinggay” O. Bilaos
SK Chairperson; Sangguniang Kabataan	Yshea Regina “Ishi” A. Mabini
Secretary; Kalihim	Jamaica Marie C. Fortunado
Treasurer; Ingat Yaman	Maricel M. Solo
Barangay Councilors; Kagawad	Eduardo “Ed” B. Alcoy
Barangay Councilors; Kagawad	Frenze Roesheene “Shin-Shin” O. Bilaos
Barangay Councilors; Kagawad	Rhoderick “Ricky” D. Bajarias
Barangay Councilors; Kagawad	Dino Aldo D. Fortuno
Barangay Councilors; Kagawad	Michael “Coach Mike” S. Canceran
Barangay Councilors; Kagawad	Danilo T. Benzon
Barangay Councilors; Kagawad	Rodel Neil C. Navarro

The new Barangay and SK Councils were elected on October 31, 2023.

== Government ==
The seat of government of Bagong Pag-asa is located at the intersection of Road 9 and Road 11.

== Demography ==
Barangay Bagong Pag-asa is the 27th most-populated barangay in Quezon City, with a population of 29,389 according to the 2020 census, up from a population of 32,267 in the 2015 census.

== See also ==
- Barangays of Quezon City
- Quezon City
- Triangle Park (Quezon City)
