= Veterans Village =

Barangay in Quezon City, Metro Manila, Philippines

- Barangay
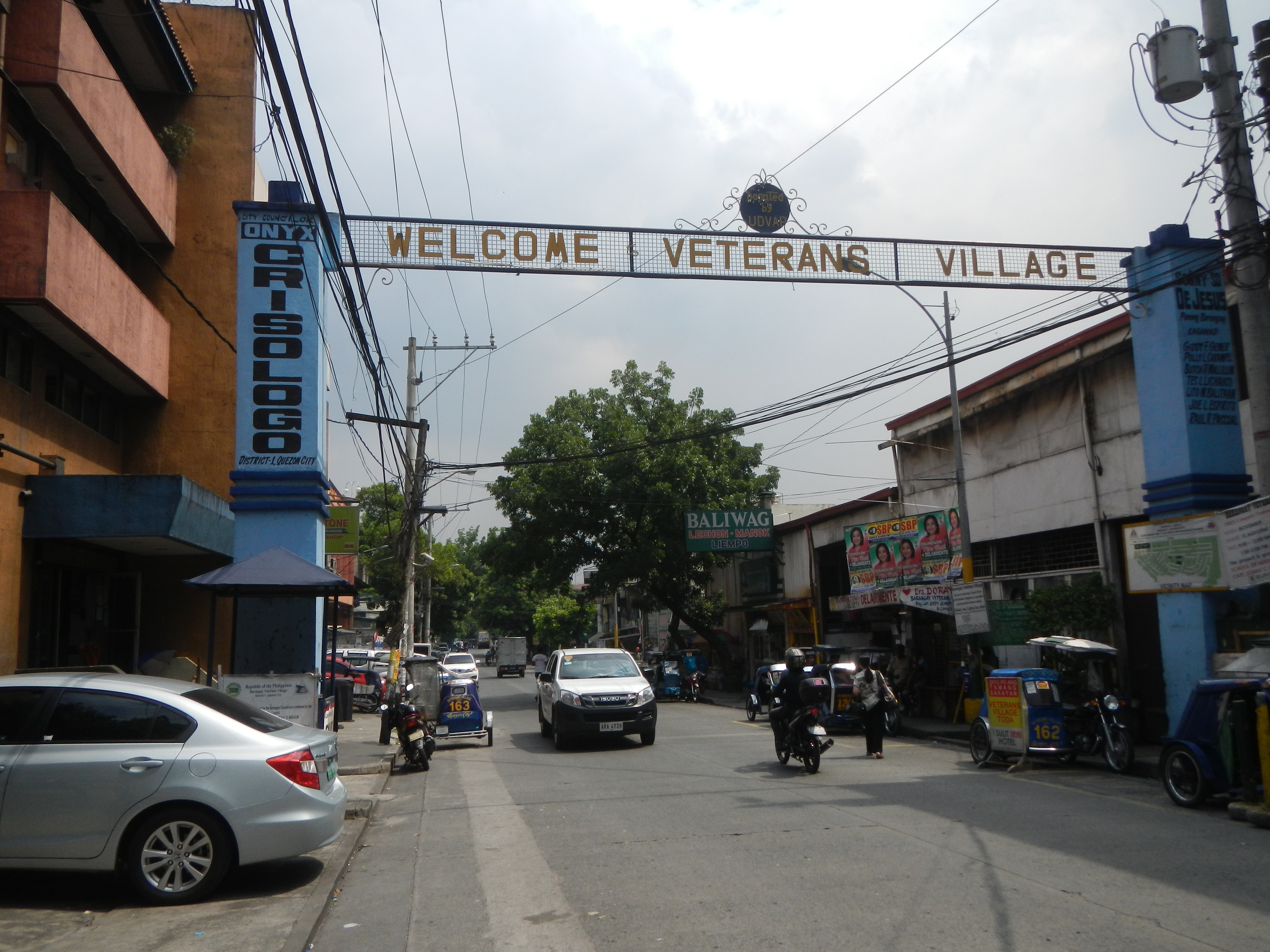
- A welcome arch of Veterans Village

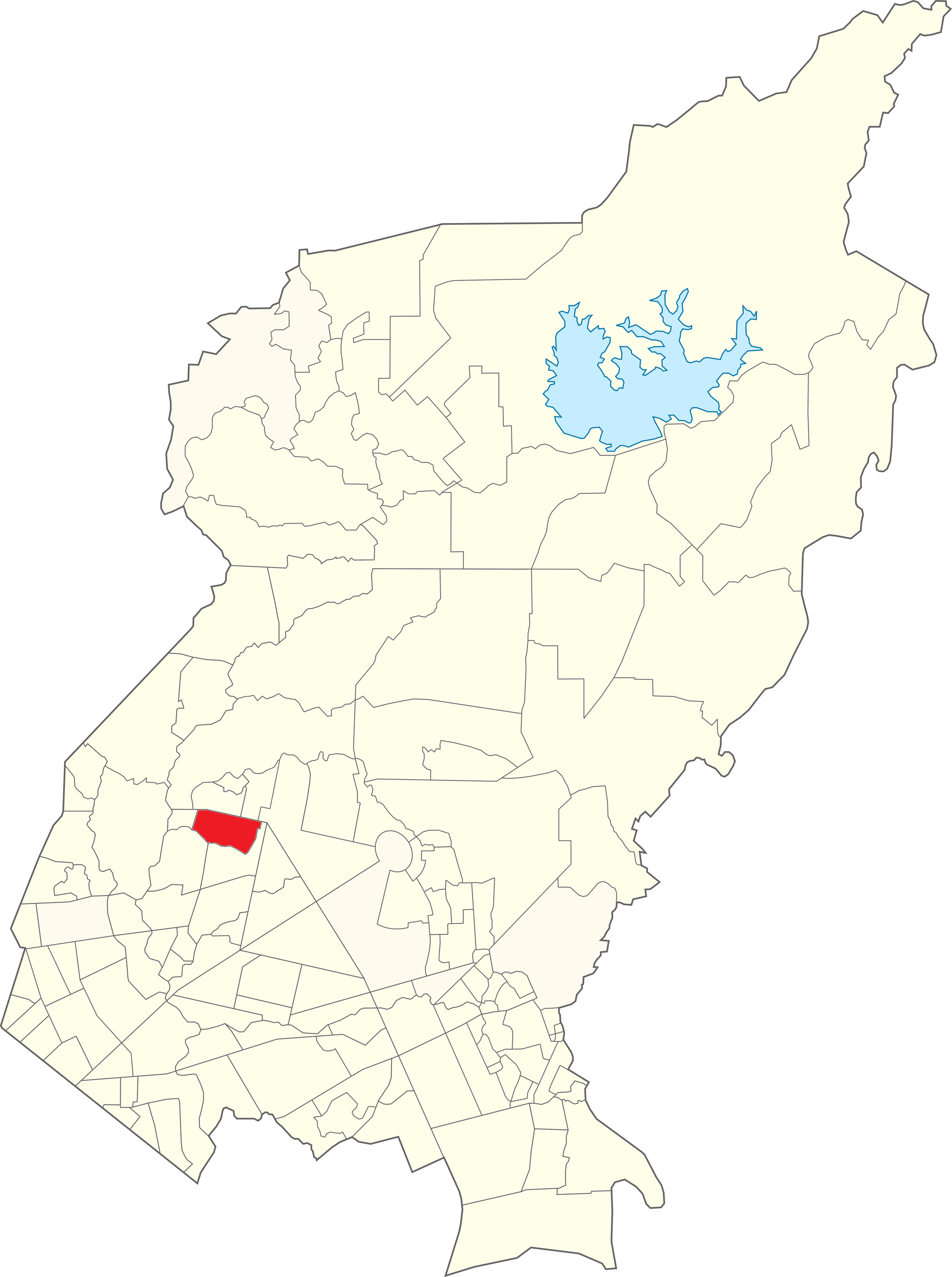
- Map of Quezon City showing Veterans Village

- Location of Veterans Village within Metro Manila
- Coordinates: 14°39′15″N 121°1′26″E
- Country: Philippines
- Region: National Capital Region
- City: Quezon City
- District: 1st District of Quezon City

Government
  - Type: Barangay
  - Barangay Chairman: Josefina Landingin
- Time zone: UTC+8 (PST)
- Zip Code: 1105
- Area code: 02

Veterans Village, (PSGC: 137404130) more commonly known as Project 7 and Muñoz, is a barangay located in Quezon City with an approximate land area of 51.941 hectares (128.35 acres) bounded by Barangay San Antonio in the Southwest, Fernando Poe Jr. Avenue (formerly Roosevelt Avenue) in the West, Barangay Bungad in the Southeast and EDSA in the North.

Other neighboring barangays include Bahay Toro, Katipunan, Santo Cristo, Alicia, Paltok, Phil-Am, Del Monte and Bagong Pag-asa under the first Legislative district.

== History ==
=== People’s Homesite and Housing Corporation (PHHC) ===
The People's Homesite and Housing Corporation (PHHC) played a major role in the development of Quezon City after the city's inauguration as the capital of the Philippines on October 22, 1949. It was responsible for the development of the 1,572-hectare (3,880-acre) land purchased as early as 1938 belonging to the Diliman Estate of the Tuason family. Construction of the Roxas Homesite (originally called Project One) along Diliman creek commenced the series of in-city housing projects namely: Quirino District (Projects 2, 3, and 4); Magsaysay District (Project 6), with the very first “Newsmen row” in the country; Bagong Pag-asa, which was the first informal settlers’ resettlement area; Veterans Village (Project 7); and Toro Hills Homesite (Project 8).

From the original land appropriated to Project 7, PHHC decided to split the area into North Bago Bantay and South Bago Bantay. The northern portion is now Barangay Ramon Magsaysay while the southern part officially becomes Veterans Village after a Quezon City resolution was passed in 1956.

=== Development of North EDSA corridor ===
After the completion of SM North EDSA, the area has developed into a commercial strip of office buildings, car dealerships, a community-based mall, an LRT station and transport hub for commuters going to and from Northern Quezon City, CaMaNava and Bulacan areas.

Notable landmarks (mostly along EDSA and Dangay Street) include Muñoz Market, Congressional Arcade, WalterMart North EDSA mall and corporate offices, Cityland's North Residences Condominium, Panorama Development Corporation's Panorama Technocenter Building, Robinsons Land Corporation-Roxaco Vanguard Hotel Corporation' Go Hotels North Edsa, Eurotel North Edsa, St. Peter Corporate Center, North Metro Hotel Apartelle, Chut's Badminton and Sports Center and service stations of Shell, UniOil, Phoenix Petroleum and PTT.

Some private schools have been established in the vicinity, such as St. Augustine School of Nursing, Our Lady of Montichiari School, Castle Ville Academy, Hope Christian Academy as well as the government-run Esteban Abada Elementary School and Lukresia Kasilag Senior High School.

A Maynilad joint sewage and septage treatment plant has been in operation at the corner of Road A and Anahaw Extension since October 18, 2013.

== Barangay and Sangguniang Kabataan officials ==
=== List of Punong Barangay ===
Full Name	Term Began	Term Ended
Engr. Gideon F. Gener	November 2002	November 2013
Clarito "Sonny" De Jesus	November 30, 2013	June 30, 2018
Josefina "JOY" L. Landingin	June 30, 2018	present

=== Members of Sangguniang Barangay ===
Title	Name
Barangay Captain; Punong Barangay	Josefina L. Landingin
Barangay councilors Kagawad	Gabrielle Ann Gener
Barangay councilors Kagawad	Ronnel Z. Lualhati
Barangay councilors Kagawad	Jessylyn J. Marata
Barangay councilors Kagawad	Rolando B. Lichauco
Barangay councilors Kagawad	Lyn DC. Alimboyogen
Barangay councilors Kagawad	Romulo N. Costales
Barangay councilors Kagawad	Reynaldo U. Arrienda
Secretary; Kalihim	Jaime M. Corpus Jr
Treasurer; Ingat Yaman	Clifford O. Mercado

=== SK Council ===
Title	Name
SK Chairperson	Diego Victor D. Castañeda
SK Councilors; SK Kagawad	Gean Bernabe
SK Councilors; SK Kagawad	Jelai Lualhati
SK Councilors; SK Kagawad	Makoy Narte
SK Councilors; SK Kagawad	Mako Agting
SK Councilors; SK Kagawad	Leigh Vesagas
SK Councilors; SK Kagawad	John Mark Coquia
SK Councilors; SK Kagawad	Bea Costales
Secretary; Kalihim	Jayvee Distajo
Treasurer; Ingat Yaman	Franz Capili

The new Barangay and SK Councils were elected on October 30, 2023.

== Demographics ==
As of the 2020 census of the Philippine Statistics Authority, the population of Barangay Veterans Village is 12,755.

== Facilities ==
Veterans Village maintains a Quezon City public library branch, Social and Hygiene clinic and recreational facilities such as a barangay sports center and covered basketball court located a few blocks away from the barangay hall.

== Places of worship ==
Coincidentally, a number of religious places and/or churches are located in the vicinity of EDSA Southbound, Bansalangin and Anahaw streets. These are Word of Hope Church, Pentecostal Missionary Church of Christ, Jesus Is Lord, Church of Christ, Ang Dating Daan – Lokal ng Muñoz, National Shrine of Ina Poon Bato under Apostolic Catholic Church and the Roman Catholic parish church of Christ The King.

== Peace and order ==
Former barangay Captain De Jesus was sued for gross neglect of duty complaint by MMDA General Manager Thomas Orbos at the Office of the Ombudsman on April 10, 2017. The barangay chief was found careless and indifferent in preventing the return of road obstructions after the MMDA helped the barangay in the clearing operations of illegally parked and junk vehicles in sidewalks 2 months prior.

== See also ==
- Barangays of Quezon City
- Legislative districts of Quezon City
- Vincent Crisologo
- Quezon City
- Manila LRT Line 1
- Barangay elections
