= Santo Cristo, Quezon City =

Barangay in Quezon City, Metro Manila, Philippines

Santo Cristo
- Barangay
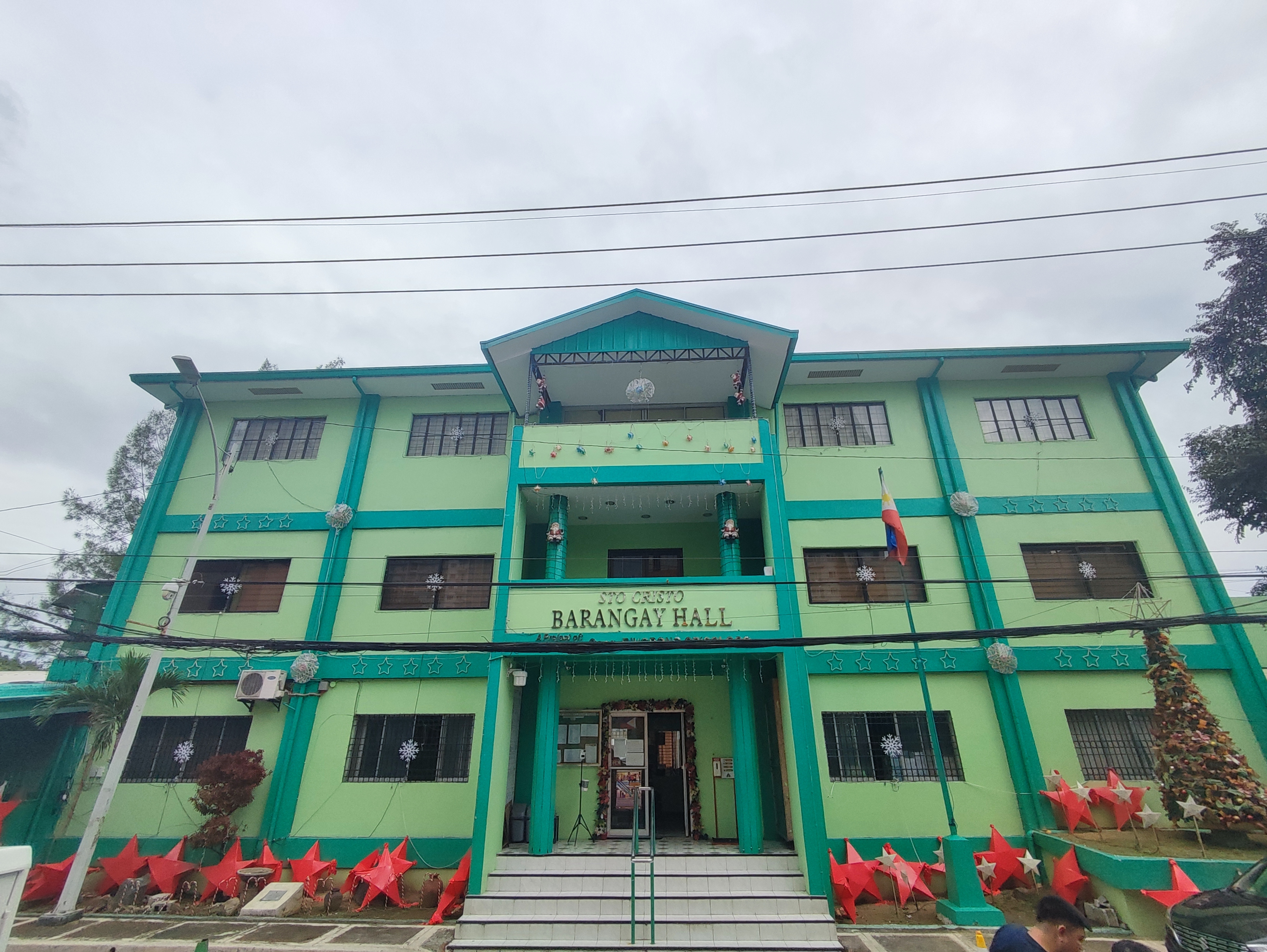
- (top) Welcome marker of Santo Cristo at the Road 8–Ilocos Sur Street–Palawan Street junction; (bottom) Barangay hall of Santo Cristo, located along Pampanga Street

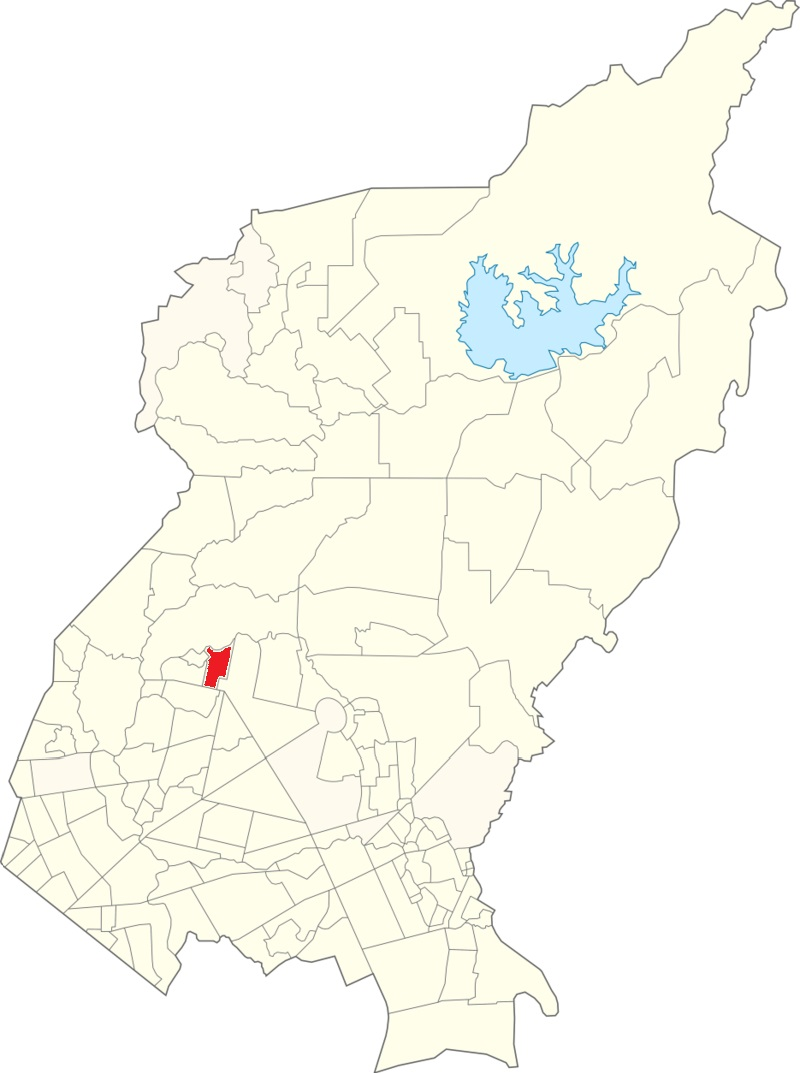
- The Map Zoning of Brgy. Sto Cristo
- Coordinates: 14°39′37″N 121°1′48″E
- Country: Philippines
- Region: National Capital Region
- City: Quezon City
- District: 1st District of Quezon City

Government
  - Type: Barangay
  - Barangay Chairman: Rey Mark John C. Navarro

Population (2020)
  - Total: 25,783
- Time zone: UTC+8 (PST)
- Zip Code: 1105
- Area code: 02

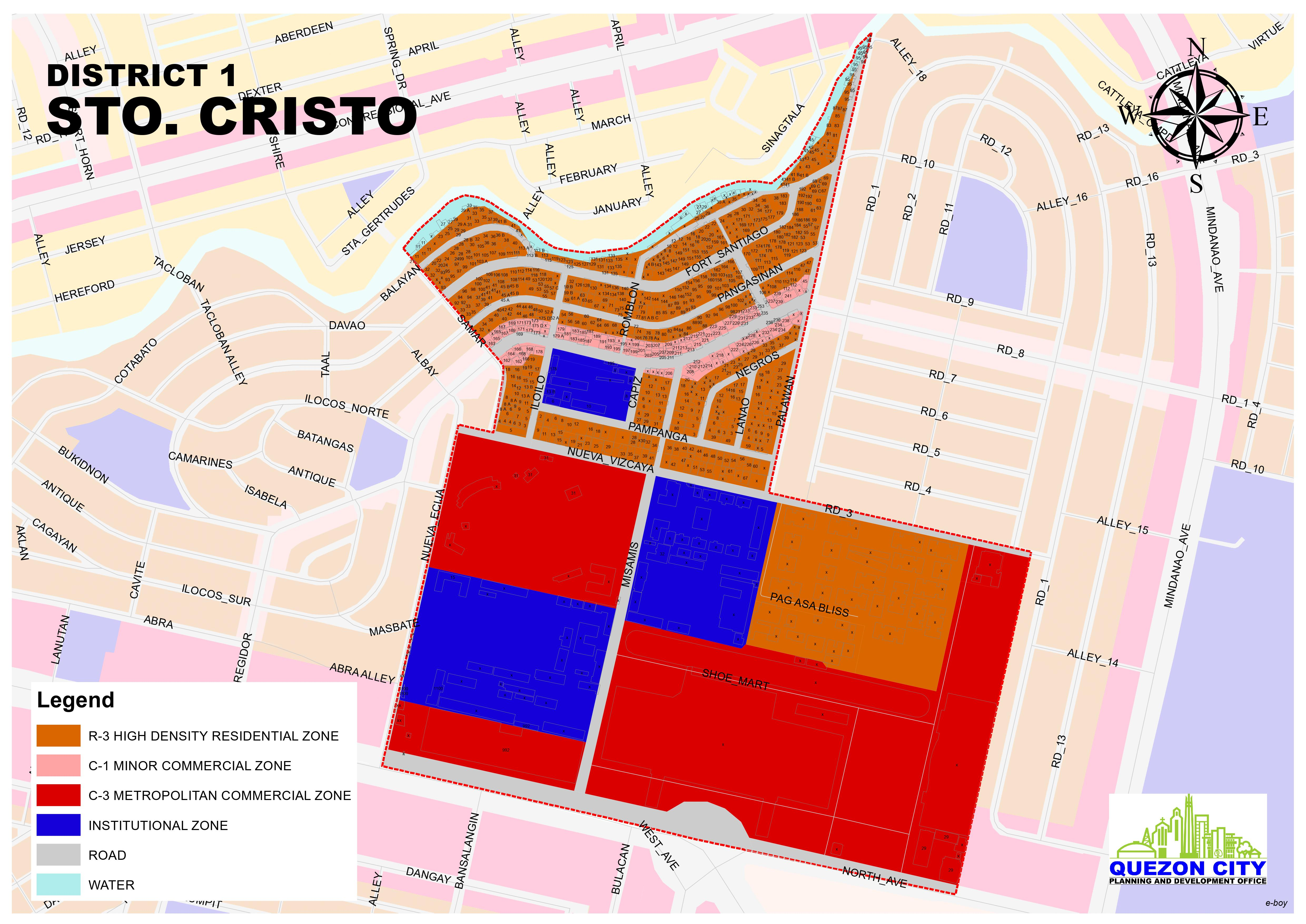
Street map

Santo Cristo (PSGC:) is a Quezon City barangay located in North EDSA, a busy commercial area of shopping malls, transport hubs and office buildings.

Neighboring barangays include Bahay Toro in the north; Veterans Village in the South, Bungad in the southeast; Bagong Pag-asa in the east; Ramon Magsaysay in the west, and Alicia in the northwest under the first Legislative district of Quezon City, Metro Manila, Philippines.

== Demography ==
As of the 2020 census published by the Philippine Statistics Authority, the population of Barangay Santo Cristo is 25,783, a two-fold increase from 2015 due to the inclusion of residents of SMDC's high-rise condominium projects Grass Residences and Fern at the Grass Residences.

== Notable Landmarks and Future Development ==
Only The Annex building of SM North EDSA complex is located within the southern portion of the barangay, as well as SMDC's Grass Residences. Fern Residences, unofficially known as Towers 4 & 5 of the original Grass Residences project, is almost complete.

== Government Schools and Offices ==
- Sto. Cristo Elementary School
- San Francisco High School
- San Francisco satellite campus of Quezon City University, formerly known as Quezon City Polytechnic University
- Quezon City Science High School
- DepEd offices for the National Capital Region and Quezon City Division
- DSWD Study and Reception Center for Children

== Barangay and Sangguniang Kabataan officials ==
=== List of Punong Barangay ===
Full Name	Term Began	Term Ended
Rey Mark John C. Navarro	June 30, 2018	June 30, 2020
	November 30, 2013	June 30, 2018

=== Members of Sangguniang Barangay ===
Title	Name
Barangay Captain; Punong Barangay	Rey Mark John C. Navarro
SK Chairperson; Sangguniang Kabataan	Mel Janssen Fernandez
Secretary; Kalihim	Joseph D. Lim
Treasurer; Ingat Yaman	Rowena R. Sarmiento
Barangay Council; Kagawad	Rizaldy C. Nepomuceno
Barangay Council; Kagawad	Rogelio C. Baclig
Barangay Council; Kagawad	Wilfredo N. Saludez
Barangay Council; Kagawad	Sheila Marie S. Gallanosa
Barangay Council; Kagawad	Rodolfo V. Ubales Sr.
Barangay Council; Kagawad	Joseph Vincent Cruz
Barangay Council; Kagawad	Edwin Alcantara

The new Barangay and SK Councils were elected in October 2023.

== See also ==
- Barangays of Quezon City
- Legislative districts of Quezon City
- Quezon City
- Arjo Atayde
- Manila Light Rail Transit System Line 1
- SM North EDSA
- Barangay elections
