= Quezon City's 4th congressional district =

Legislative district of the Philippines

- Constituency for the House of Representatives of the Philippines
- Interactive map of the district boundaries
- City: Quezon City
- Region: Metro Manila
- Population: 407,402 (2020)
- Electorate: 234,450 (2025)
- Major settlements: 40 barangays: Bagong Lipunan ng Crame, Botocan, Central, Kristong Hari, Damayang Lagi, Doña Aurora, Doña Imelda, Doña Josefa, Don Manuel, Horseshoe, Immaculate Conception, Kalusugan, Kamuning, Kaunlaran, Krus na Ligas, Laging Handa, Malaya, Mariana, Obrero, Old Capitol Site, Paligsahan, Pinyahan, Pinagkaisahan, QMC, Roxas, Sacred Heart, San Isidro, San Martin de Porres, San Vicente, Santo Niño, Santol, Sikatuna Village, South Triangle, Tatalon, Teachers Village East, Teachers Village West, U.P. Campus, U.P. Village, Valencia
- Area: 23.42 km^{2} (9.04 sq mi)

Current constituency
- Created: 1987
- Representative: Bong Suntay
- Political party: NPC
- Congressional bloc: Minority

Quezon City's 4th congressional district is one of the six congressional districts of the Philippines in Quezon City. It has been represented in the House of Representatives of the Philippines since 1987. The district consists of the south central barangays bordering Manila and San Juan. It includes the Diliman and New Manila areas. Quezon Avenue borders it to the north and EDSA to the east. It is currently represented in the 20th Congress by Jesus Manuel Angel "Bong" C. Suntay of the Nationalist People's Coalition (NPC).

Two-time Speaker Feliciano Belmonte Jr. hailed from this district.

== Representation history ==
#	Image	Member	Term of office		Congress	Party	Electoral history	Constituent LGUs
#	Image	Member	Start	End	Congress	Party	Electoral history	Constituent LGUs
=== Quezon City's 4th district for the House of Representatives of the Philippines ===
District created February 2, 1987.
1		Mel Mathay (1932-2013)	June 30, 1987	June 30, 1992	8th	KBL	Elected in 1987.	1987–present Bagong Lipunan ng Crame, Botocan, Central, Damayang Lagi, Doña Aurora, Doña Imelda, Doña Josefa, Don Manuel, Horseshoe, Immaculate Conception, Kalusugan, Kamuning, Kaunlaran, Kristong Hari, Krus na Ligas, Laging Handa, Malaya, Mariana, Obrero, Old Capitol Site, Paligsahan, Pinyahan, Pinagkaisahan, QMC, Roxas, Sacred Heart, San Isidro, San Martin de Porres, San Vicente, Santo Niño, Santol, Sikatuna Village, South Triangle, Tatalon, Teachers Village East, Teachers Village West, U.P. Campus, U.P. Village, Valencia
2		Feliciano Belmonte Jr. (born 1936)	June 30, 1992	June 30, 2001	9th	Independent	Elected in 1992.	
2		Feliciano Belmonte Jr. (born 1936)	June 30, 1992	June 30, 2001	10th	Lakas	Re-elected in 1995.	
2		Feliciano Belmonte Jr. (born 1936)	June 30, 1992	June 30, 2001	11th	Lakas	Re-elected in 1998.	
3		Nanette Castelo-Daza (born 1960)	June 30, 2001	June 30, 2010	12th	Lakas	Elected in 2001.	
3		Nanette Castelo-Daza (born 1960)	June 30, 2001	June 30, 2010	13th	Lakas	Re-elected in 2004.	
3		Nanette Castelo-Daza (born 1960)	June 30, 2001	June 30, 2010	14th	Liberal	Re-elected in 2007.	
(2)		Feliciano Belmonte Jr. (born 1936)	June 30, 2010	June 30, 2019	15th	Liberal	Elected in 2010.	
(2)		Feliciano Belmonte Jr. (born 1936)	June 30, 2010	June 30, 2019	16th	Liberal	Re-elected in 2013.	
(2)		Feliciano Belmonte Jr. (born 1936)	June 30, 2010	June 30, 2019	17th	Independent	Re-elected in 2016.	
4		Bong Suntay (born 1970)	June 30, 2019	June 30, 2022	18th	PDP–Laban (SBP)	Elected in 2019.	
5		Marvin Rillo (born 1976)	June 30, 2022	June 30, 2025	19th	Lakas (SBP)	Elected in 2022.	
(4)		Bong Suntay (born 1970)	June 30, 2025	Incumbent	20th	UNA	Elected in 2025.	
(4)		Bong Suntay (born 1970)	June 30, 2025	Incumbent	20th	NPC	Elected in 2025.	

== Election results ==
=== 2010 ===
Philippine House of Representatives election at Quezon City's 4th district
Party	Candidate	Votes	%
Liberal	Feliciano Belmonte, Jr.	99,813	78.42
Lakas–Kampi	Don de Castro	23,476	18.44
PMP	Hans Palacios	3,992	3.14
Valid ballots		127,281	87.38
Invalid or blank votes		18,382	12.62
Total votes		145,663	100.00
Liberal hold			

=== 2013 ===
2013 Philippine House of Representatives election at Quezon City's 4th district
Party	Candidate	Votes	%
Liberal	Feliciano Belmonte, Jr.	93,888	76.64
PMP	Hans Palacios	9,447	7.71
Margin of victory		84,441	68.93%
Valid ballots		103,335	84.35
Invalid or blank votes		19,167	15.65
Total votes		122,502	100.00
Liberal hold			

=== 2016 ===
2016 Philippine House of Representatives election at Quezon City's 4th district
Party	Candidate	Votes	%
Liberal	Feliciano "Sonny" Belmonte, Jr.	115,007	
Independent	Hans Palacios	6,900	
Independent	Hadja Lorna Aquino	3,691	
Invalid or blank votes		23,614	
Total votes		149,212	
Liberal hold			

=== 2019 ===
2019 Philippine House of Representatives election in the 4th District of Quezon City
Party	Candidate	Votes	%
PDP–Laban	Jesus "Bong" Suntay	103,338	85.20
Independent	Kit Rodriguez	17,991	14.80
Total votes		121,329	100.00
PDP–Laban gain from Independent			

=== 2022 ===
2022 Philippine House of Representatives election in the 4th District of Quezon City
Party	Candidate	Votes	%
Lakas	Marvin Rillo	83,569	50.59
PDP–Laban	Jesus "Bong" Suntay	81,517	49.41
Total votes		165,086	100.00
Lakas gain from PDP–Laban			

=== 2025 ===
Candidate	Party	Votes	%
Bong Suntay	United Nationalist Alliance	91,504	50.07
Marvin Rillo (incumbent)	Lakas–CMD	91,243	49.93
Total		182,747	100.00
United Nationalist Alliance gain from Lakas–CMD			
Source: Commission on Elections

== See also ==
- Legislative districts of Quezon City

House of Representatives of the Philippines
Preceded by Camarines Sur's 3rd congressional district	Home district of the speaker January 24, 2001 – June 30, 2001	Succeeded by Pangasinan's 4th congressional district
Preceded by Davao City's 1st congressional district	Home district of the speaker July 26, 2010 – June 30, 2016	Succeeded by Davao del Norte's 1st congressional district
