= Legislative districts of Quezon City =

Legislative district of the Philippines

legislative districts of Quezon City: District 1 District 2 District 3 District 4 District 5 District 6

The legislative districts of Quezon City are the representations of the highly urbanized city of Quezon in the various national and local legislatures of the Philippines. At present, the province is represented in the House of Representatives of the Philippines by its six congressional districts, with the districts' representatives being elected every three years. Additionally, each district is allotted six seats in the Quezon City Council, creating a total of thirty-six elective seats in the legislature.

== History ==
From its creation in 1939 to 1975, Quezon City was represented as part of Rizal Province, with the western areas that formerly belonged to Caloocan, Mandaluyong, and San Juan voting as part of that province's first district, and the eastern areas that formerly belonged to Marikina, Montalban (now Rodriguez), Pasig, and San Mateo voting in the second district.

In the disruption caused by the Second World War, Quezon City was incorporated into the City of Greater Manila on January 1, 1942, by virtue of Manuel Quezon's Executive Order No. 400 as a wartime emergency measure. Greater Manila was represented by two delegates in the National Assembly of the Japanese-sponsored Second Philippine Republic: one was the city mayor (an ex officio member), while the other was elected through a citywide assembly of KALIBAPI members during the Japanese occupation of the Philippines. Upon the restoration of the Philippine Commonwealth in 1945, Quezon City's divided representation between the two districts of Rizal was retained; this remained so until 1975 on the newly-created Metro Manila, also known as National Capital Region.

The city was represented in the Interim Batasang Pambansa as part of Region IV from 1978 to 1984. Quezon City residents first elected representatives separate from Rizal in the 1984 election, where four representatives, elected at-large, represented the city at the Regular Batasang Pambansa.

Quezon City was reapportioned into four congressional districts under the new Constitution which was proclaimed on February 11, 1987. It elected members to the restored House of Representatives starting that same year.

By virtue of Republic Act No. 10170 approved on July 2, 2012, the fifth and sixth districts were created out of the second district. Residents of the two new districts began to elect their own representatives beginning in the 2013 elections.

== Current districts ==
The city was last redistricted on July 2, 2012, where the fifth and sixth districts were apportioned. The city's congressional delegation currently composes of three members of the National Unity Party, two members of the Partido Federal ng Pilipinas, and one member of United Nationalist Alliance; five members are also members of the Serbisyo sa Bayan Party. All five representatives are part of the majority bloc and one representative is part of the minority bloc in the 20th Congress.

Legislative districts and representatives of Quezon City
District	Current Representative	Party		Constituent LGUs	Population (2020)	Area	Map
District	Current Representative	Local	National	Constituent LGUs	Population (2020)	Area	Map
1st	Arjo Atayde (since 2022); Santo Domingo	SBP	NUP	List: Alicia; Bagong Pag-asa; Bahay Toro; Balingasa; Bungad; Damar; Damayan; Del Monte; Katipunan; Mariblo; Masambong; N.S. Amoranto (Gintong Silahis); Nayong Kanluran; Paang Bundok; Pag-ibig sa Nayon; Paltok; Paraiso; Phil-Am; Project 6; Ramon Magsaysay; Saint Peter; Salvacion; San Antonio; San Isidro Labrador; San Jose; Santa Cruz; Santa Teresita; Santo Cristo; Santo Domingo; Siena; Talayan; Vasra; Veterans Village; West Triangle	384,384	19.59 km^{2}	
2nd	Ralph Tulfo (since 2022); Holy Spirit	SBP	PFP	List: Bagong Silangan; Batasan Hills; Commonwealth; Holy Spirit; Payatas	738,328	19.59 km^{2}	
3rd	Franz Pumaren (since 2022); White Plains	SBP	NUP	List: Amihan; Bagumbuhay; Bagumbayan; Bayanihan; Blue Ridge A; Blue Ridge B; Camp Aguinaldo; Claro; Dioquino Zobel; Duyan-Duyan; E. Rodriguez; East Kamias; Escopa I; Escopa II; Escopa III; Escopa IV; Libis; Loyola Heights; Mangga; Marilag; Masagana; Matandang Balara; Milagrosa; Pansol; Quirino 2-A; Quirino 2-B; Quirino 2-C; Quirino 3-A; Saint Ignatius; San Roque; Silangan; Socorro; Tagumpay; Ugong Norte; Villa Maria Clara; West Kamias; White Plains	319,371	46.27 km^{2}	
4th	Bong Suntay (since 2025); Mariana		NPC	List: Bagong Lipunan ng Crame; Botocan; Central; Kristong Hari; Damayang Lagi; Doña Aurora; Doña Imelda; Doña Josefa; Don Manuel; East Triangle; Horseshoe; Immaculate Conception; Kalusugan; Kamuning; Kaunlaran; Krus na Ligas; Laging Handa; Malaya; Mariana; Old Capitol Site; Paligsahan; Pinyahan; Pinagkaisahan; QMC; Roxas; Sacred Heart; San Isidro Galas; San Martin de Porres (Cubao); San Vicente; Santo Niño; Santol; Tatalon; Teachers Village East; Teachers Village West; U.P. Campus; U.P. Village; Valencia	407,402	23.42 km^{2}	
5th	PM Vargas (since 2022); Pasong Putik Proper	SBP	PFP	List: Bagbag; Capri; Fairview; Greater Lagro; Gulod; Kaligayahan; Nagkaisang Nayon; North Fairview; Novaliches Proper; Pasong Putik Proper; San Agustin; San Bartolome; Santa Lucia; Santa Monica	596,047	28.03 km^{2}	
6th	Marivic Co-Pilar (since 2022); Pasong Tamo	SBP	NUP	List: Apolonio Samson; Baesa; Balong-bato; Culiat; New Era; Pasong Tamo; Sangandaan; Sauyo; Talipapa; Tandang Sora; Unang Sigaw	514,516	21.97 km^{2}	

== At-Large (defunct) ==
Period	Representatives
Regular Batasang Pambansa; 1984–1986	Ismael A. Mathay, Jr.
Regular Batasang Pambansa; 1984–1986	Orlando S. Mercado
Regular Batasang Pambansa; 1984–1986	Cecilia Muñoz-Palma
Regular Batasang Pambansa; 1984–1986	Alberto G. Romulo

== See also ==
- Legislative districts of Rizal
- Legislative districts of Manila
- List of barangays in Quezon City
