= Sanctuarium =

Columbarium in Quezon City, Philippines

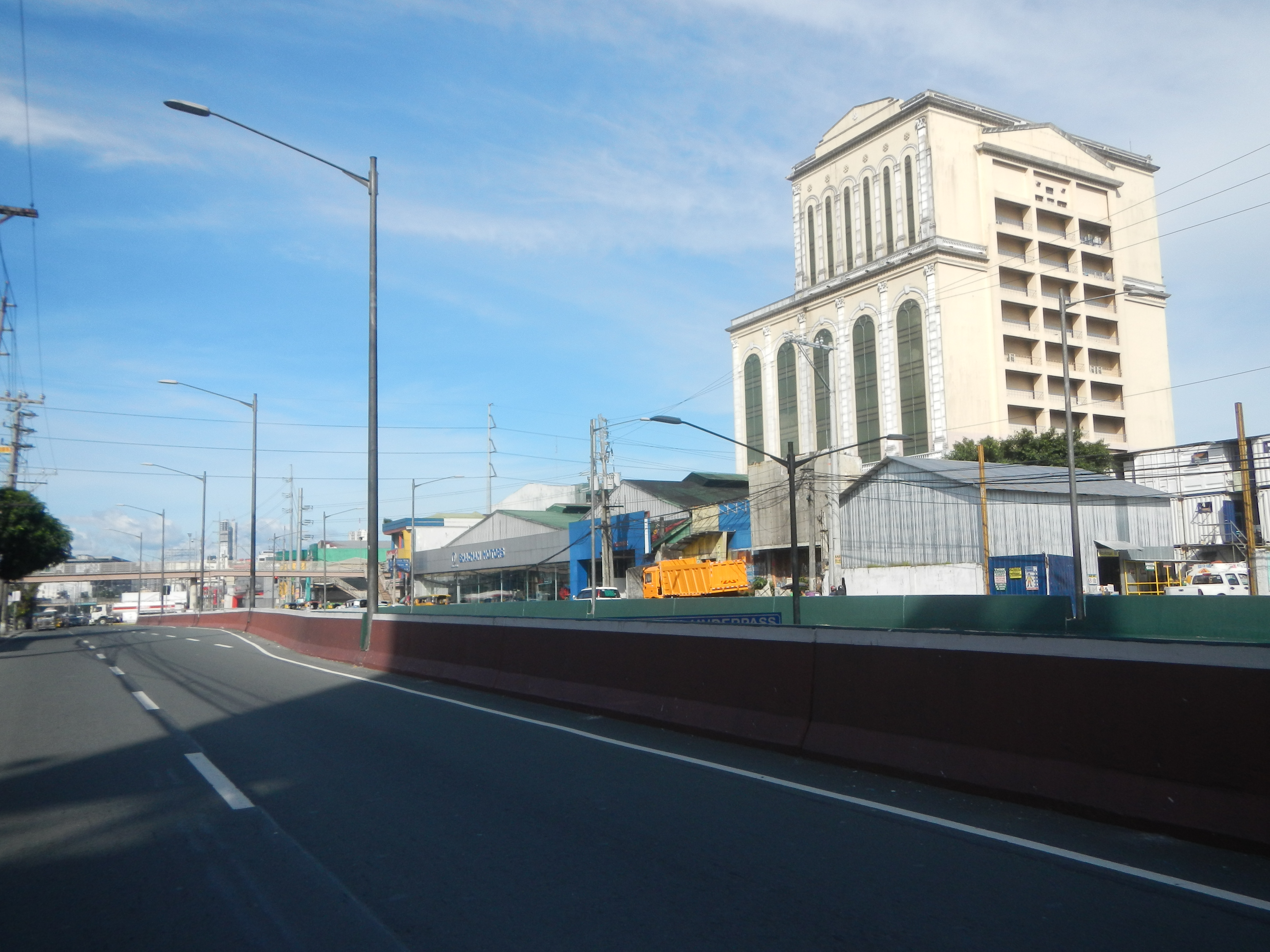
- Interactive map of the Sanctuarium area

General information
- Status: Completed
- Location: Quezon City, Philippines
- Coordinates: 14°37′39″N 121°00′49″E
- Opened: 2006
- Owner: The Everliving Company

Height
- Architectural: Gothic-inspired

Technical details
- Floor count: 12

Design and construction
- Architecture firm: Edward Co Tan + Architects

Other information
- Parking: 4 basement levels
- Columbarium details
- Vaults: 25,000 (2012)
- Number of interments: 2,000 (2012)
- Website: sanctuarium.net

The Sanctuarium is an integrated memorial home cum columbary situated along Gregorio Araneta Avenue corner Agno Street in Quezon City, Metro Manila, Philippines.

== History ==
In October 2002, Mayor Feliciano Belmonte Jr. led the groundbreaking of the Sanctuarium which was established in 2006. Initially, only 18 percent of the Sanctuarium's patrons preferred cremation over traditional burial but by 2012, it was reported that this figure rose to 60 percent. The Sanctuarium is one of the biggest columbariums in Asia, with its current capacity housing 25,000 vaults. Almost half of this figure has already been sold and as of 2012, the establishment already inters 2,000 remains. It was developed by the Everliving Company, chaired by Benjamin Dychangco, designed and constructed by renowned Architect Adrian Chua of ACA project Management Resources, Architect N. Sy and Associates, E.D.L. Espinosa Jr. and Associates, Integral Tech., Memar Enterprises, Edna Turay and Associates, Edward Tan and Engineering and Construction Corp.

== Facilities ==
The Sanctuarium is hosted inside a landscaped 12-storey building erected in a 2,426 sq.m. lot with 4 basement parking levels. It hosts 29 fully-airconditioned ecumenical vigil chapels, a cafe called the Genki Japanesque Café, and a flower shop. Edward Co Tan +Architects was responsible for the building design. Its main lobby has a sparkling fountain, an eternal flame and concierge services. Family rooms have audiovisual and library of Video CD. The fifth to the twelfth floors contain perpetual ash vaults, with high-speed elevators and escalators. The roof deck showcases a Zen garden and a universal chapel.

The columbarium is one of the largest in Southeast Asia, capable of housing 25,000 vaults. The building has 50,000 more vaults located in soon-to-be-operational levels.

== Incidents ==
In October 2018, Clarice, a 15-year-old student from Santo Domingo, Quezon City committed suicide when she leaped from the Sanctuarium's 10th floor.
