= SM North EDSA =

Shopping mall in Quezon City, Philippines

- SM North EDSA in 2020
- Location: Quezon City, Metro Manila, Philippines
- Coordinates: 14°39′25″N 121°01′49″E
- Address: EDSA (C-4 Road) corner North Avenue, Barangays Santo Cristo and Bagong Pag-Asa
- Opened: November 8, 1985; 40 years ago
- Previous names: The SM Center North EDSA (1985–1986); The SM City North EDSA (1986–2002); SM City North EDSA (2002–2022)
- Developer: SM Prime Holdings
- Manager: SM Prime Holdings
- Architect: William V. Coscolluela; Arquitectonica; JSLA Architects
- Num. of stores: 968 stores (including 300 dining outlets)
- Num. of anchor tenants: 36
- Floor area: 477,000 m^{2} (5,130,000 sq ft)
- Floors: City Center: 4; The Block: 5; The Annex: 6; Interior Zone: 1; Car Park Plaza: 5; Northlink: 6; North Towers: 2
- Parking: 10,000+ slots
- Public transit: North Avenue; E SM North EDSA; 18 33 SM North EDSA; 8 SM North EDSA; Future: MMS North Triangle Common Station
- Website: SM North Edsa

SM North EDSA (formerly known as The SM Center North EDSA, The SM City North EDSA, and SM City North EDSA), is a large shopping mall located in Quezon City, Metro Manila, Philippines. This mall ranks as the most crowded and visited mall in the country, pulling in an estimated daily foot traffic of 420,000 visitors. It is owned and operated by SM Prime Holdings and opened on November 8, 1985 as The SM Center North EDSA.

SM North EDSA was the first SM Supermall in the country and the largest shopping mall in the Philippines from 2008 to 2011, in 2014, and from 2015 to 2021. Originally with a gross floor area of 120,000 square meters (1,300,000 sq ft), a continuous series of redevelopments since 2019 has expanded the mall's gross floor area to 477,000 square meters (5,130,000 sq ft). This redevelopment began with the opening of The Block in July 2006, followed by the new Annex building opening in December 2008 and the Sky Garden opening in May 2009. The Car Park Plaza was turned into a lifestyle center in 2009.

== History ==
Old facade of The Block with the Sky Garden under-construction in the foreground.

SM North EDSA was built on 16 hectares (40 acres) of marshland, in a relatively remote location, at a time when a political crisis saw interest rates rise as high as 45 percent. According to the 1941 Frost Plan designating Quezon City as the capital of the Philippines, the area was supposed to be the site of the 46-hectare (110-acre) National Exposition Grounds. In the 1970s the area became a U.S. Navy Transmitter Station Naval Reservation, and the lot was also owned by the Government Service Insurance System and intended as a prospective site for houses for public school teachers.

The mall opened on November 8, 1985 as The SM Center North EDSA. It was the first mall built by SM Prime Holdings Inc., with the initial tenants being SM's fifth department store and first supermarket. It was renamed The SM City North EDSA in 1986, becoming the first SM mall with the "City" branding. As more tenants and entertainment venues were added, The SM City North EDSA came to be known as the mall that institutionalized the "one-stop" shopping concept in the Philippines, thereby introducing "malling" as a pastime.

Over the years SM North EDSA has seen many expansions and redevelopments. In February 1988 a four-level carpark known as Annex 1 was constructed, with the lower ground floor converted into an enclosed retail space and another level added to the main mall. In July 1989 a two-floor annex known as the original Annex 2 was built, providing more leasable space, a bowling alley, and four additional movie theaters. Later, the main building and the annexes were expanded with the addition of a lower ground level, with the first level of the Carpark Plaza converted into a Cyberzone, reserved mainly for technology and gadget retail.

In 2002, the mall was renamed as SM City North EDSA.

Sky Dome

On July 28, 2006, Annex 3 (also known as The Block) opened, featuring a hypermarket, its flagship toy store, an additional four movie theaters, retail shops, and restaurants. On February 8, 2007, the original Annex 2 was completely demolished and construction of a new building started, with the current Annex 2 opening on December 12, 2008. In May 2009 The Sky Garden was opened to the public, featuring a linear park garden and a 1,500-seat Sky Dome. In 2011 the six-story Annex 4 (known as The Northlink) was completed, housing BPO companies and retail stores.

Logo from 2022 to 2023

In 2022, after almost 36 years, the mall's "City" branding was dropped, with it officially renamed as simply SM North EDSA.

== Main mall complex ==
The main mall complex of SM North EDSA currently (as of June 2026) consists of the City Center, the Interior Zone (including the Car Park Plaza), The Annex, The Block, The Sky Garden, The Northlink, and The North Towers. Further expansions of the complex are connected to the main mall complex by a series of footbridges on various sides.

=== City Center (main building) ===
The City Center in 2009

Opened on November 8, 1985, the original City Center building consisted of only three floors, although a fourth floor was later added to keep up with demand. It currently has a total gross floor area of 190,000 m^{2} (2,000,000 sq ft), and features spherical skylights.

As the hub of the complex, the City Center houses the mall's main retail anchors: SM Store (formerly The SM Store, and SM Department Store), and SM Supermarket. It is also houses leisure anchors such as SM Food Court, an entertainment center, and a newly modernized cineplex that includes the country's second IMAX Theater. The main dining establishments of the City Center are situated on the second level, where they break through the frontage in a sequence of linear casements overlooking the Sky Garden.

The City Center building has undergone several changes since 2019, with the renovation of the west wing cinema area, conversion of east wing cinemas to tenant spaces, and the construction of a new go-kart facility in the 3rd-level area formerly occupied by SM Store. The go-kart facility opened on May 1 2022 and the four new digital cinemas in the west wing opened on May 4, 2022, replacing Cinemas 9 and 10. In 2023 a facility named Dino Land opened at the former eastern entrance of SM Store.

=== SM cinemas ===
By 1989 the City Center building housed eight cinemas, but with the opening of the cinemas in the Annex 2 building, City Center Cinemas 1 to 4 were renamed Cinemas 9 to 12. Cinemas 9 and 10 were closed for renovation and redevelopment in 2019, followed by Cinemas 7 and 8 in January 2020.

Cinemas 5 to 8 in the east wing were converted into tenant and retail spaces in 2022, and the new Cinemas 4 to 7 opened on May 4, 2022.

In 2022 the original Cinema 11 was temporarily operated as an overflow cinema for blockbuster films when other cinemas were occupied or fully reserved. However, it closed in 2023 and was replaced by a Paris Baguette bakeshop.

=== IMAX cinema ===
The IMAX cinema opened on July 14, 2009 in the space occupied by the former Cinema 12. It was the second IMAX cinema in the country after the one at SM Mall of Asia, and the first to use digital projection.

The IMAX cinema was closed on March 14, 2020 in the midst of the COVID-19 pandemic in the Philippines. It was supposed to remain permanently closed, but following successful negotiations between SM Cinema and IMAX Corporation it re-opened as an IMAX cinema on May 4, 2022. Prior to that, from January to April 2022, it had temporarily operated as an LSF ("Large Screen Format") cinema with films shown in non-IMAX DMR releases.

In September 2024, following the expanded partnership between SM Cinema and IMAX Corporation, the IMAX cinema was temporarily closed for renovation and an IMAX with Laser upgrade installed. The IMAX with Laser cinema opened on October 23, 2024.

=== Interior Zone (Annex 1) ===
The original Annex 1 was built in February 1988 and was a four-level parking building known as The Car Park Plaza. In the early 2000s an open parking area was built beside it in order to accommodate more vehicles and to integrate the building with the newly constructed The Block. In the 2010s the building was expanded vertically by adding two floors via a steel structure with integrated rooftop solar panels, and was connected to the main mall via a footbridge on the second floor. The Car Park Plaza also featured the first Cyberzone, which later moved to The Annex building to make way for an additional 8,000 parking spaces.

Today the former Cyberzone has been transformed into a "lifestyle center" called The Interior Zone. Designed by Australian Architects EAT, the 300-meter-long (980 ft) facility opened on November 16, 2009, with its total gross floor area of 30,000 m^{2} (320,000 sq ft) containing shops for furniture, houseware, décor, upholstery, wallpaper, tiles and lighting fixtures.

On the seventh level of Annex 1 there is a solar power plant made up of 5,760 solar panels that can generate up to 1.5 megawatts of power. When installed in 2014 it made SM North EDSA the largest solar-powered shopping mall in Southeast Asia, only losing the title in May 2016 to the Robinsons Starmills in San Fernando, Pampanga.

=== The Annex (Annex 2) ===
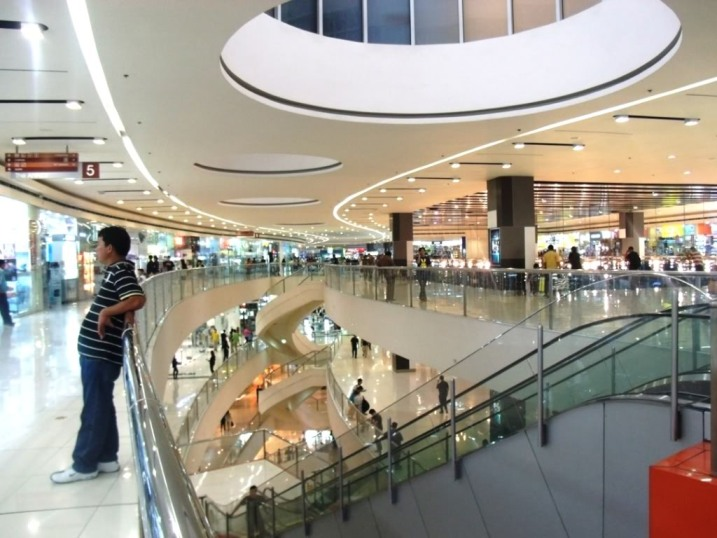
The Annex hallway

The original Annex 2 (formerly The SM City Annex) was opened on July 28, 1989. Its three floors were an expansion of the City Center and featured close to 200 shops and restaurants. On top of the four additional movie cinemas it also housed a bingo hall, an amusement center, and a bowling alley. The lower ground floor (or basement) also served as the administration office of SM North EDSA, alongside beauty clinics and a Hardware Workshop. A footbridge was constructed at the left side of the City Center to provide easy access to Annex 2.

On February 20, 2002 the four cinemas were closed and on February 8, 2007 the original Annex 2 was closed and demolished as part of SM North EDSA's redevelopment plan. On December 12, 2008 it was modified and has a curve hallways on every floors and along the end of the edge of the mall. It reopened with high-end retail stores, specialty restaurants, a Cyberzone, a game arcade, and in June 2009, a new bowling center on the lower ground floor. The current Annex 2 measures 125,000 m^{2} (1,350,000 sq ft), and like The Block, has an exterior of perforated metal panels forming an undulating aquamarine ribbon, along with a curvilinear atrium stretching its length.

=== The Block (Annex 3) ===
The Block

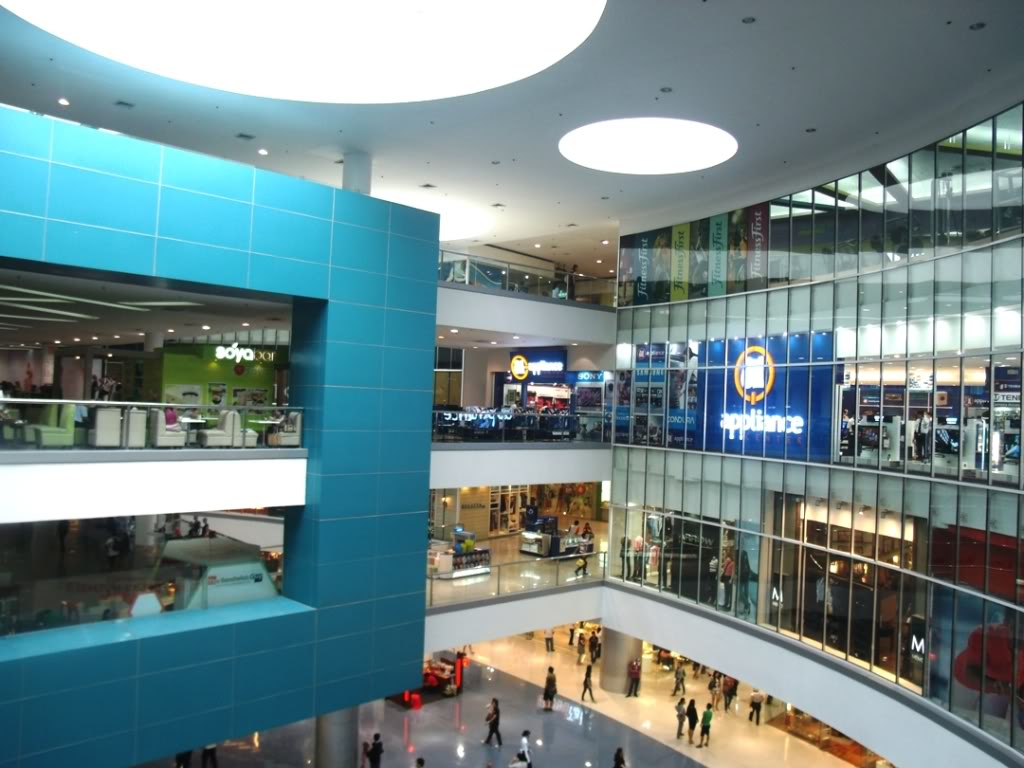
The Block atrium

The Block is situated on one of the former open parking areas to the right of the main building, and was opened on July 29, 2006. This 90,000-square-metre (970,000 sq ft) mall has five levels of retail shops and restaurants, five digital cinemas including two Director's Clubs, and a 10,000 m^{2} (110,000 sq ft) SM Hypermarket on the ground level. Its design is centered on a large oval courtyard criss-crossed by multiple footbridges on several levels and lit through large circular skylights. The building contains most of the high-end anchor stores owned or operated by SM, including but not limited to H&M, Uniqlo, Sports Central, Watsons and Vikings. It is also home to the Our Lady of the Most Holy Rosary Chapel, a Roman Catholic chapel located on the fourth level.

The building was renovated in 2023 with the addition of a new biophilic look incorporating elements of the natural world, an escalator connected to SM Hypermarket, the relocation and renovation of stores, a new floor layout and tiles, and a brand new food hall located on the 4th floor, akin to the MOA Food Hall and Mega Food Hall of SM Mall of Asia and SM Megamall respectively. In September 2025, Disney Store opened on the 3rd floor.

Several footbridges connect The Block to the existing mall, carpark areas, Sky Garden, and the North Towers.

=== The Northlink (Annex 4) ===
The Northlink (also known as North Link) is the fourth addition to the complex and was opened on May 22, 2010. Its six-story structure primarily houses BPO companies, other office tenants, and a few retail stores, with footbridges connecting it to other parts of the mall. It has an open deck on its top level for the mall's private use. In 2023 it added stores like Decathlon and Muji.

=== The North Towers (Annex 5) ===
The North Towers is a panoramic building located beside The Block and facing North Avenue, sited on the two-hectare (4.9-acre) lot within the SM North EDSA Complex that housed the former Super Sale Club. In 2008 this warehouse building was leased to Ace Hardware and Bingo Bonanza, both of which later moved to The Annex when it opened. Kotse Network later leased a portion of the warehouse building, and another part was converted into a parking lot for valet service until the building's subsequent demolition to make way for the North Towers.

The shortest of The North Towers' five cascading towers is occupied by the "Park Inn by Radisson Blu Hotel North EDSA", while the remaining towers contain office space. The official opening of the three front buildings and the 33,000 m^{2} (360,000 sq ft) mall component named The North Towers Mall took place on December 7, 2018, with a second phase seeing the completion of the two remaining and tallest buildings.

=== Sky Garden ===
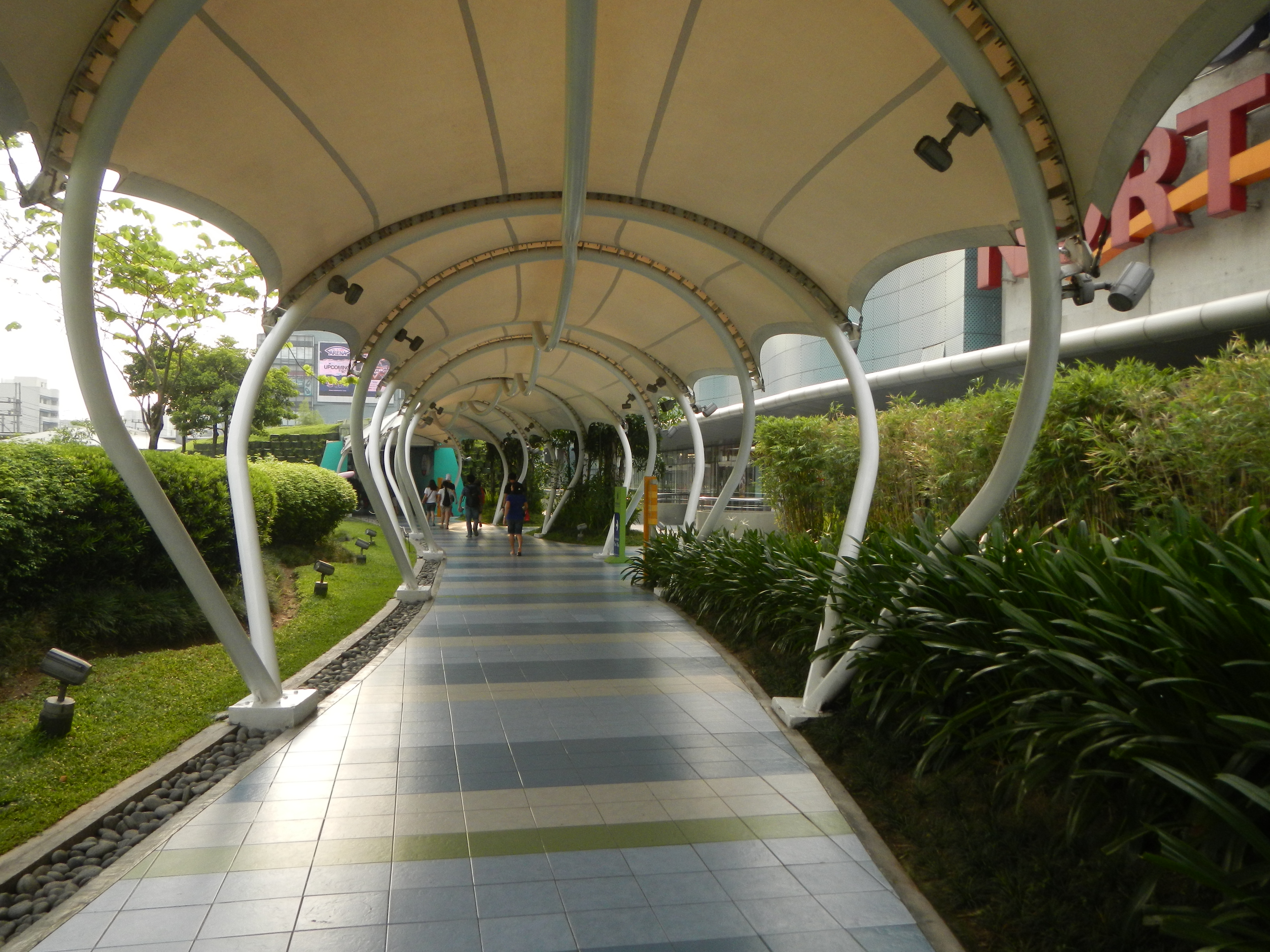
The Sky Garden

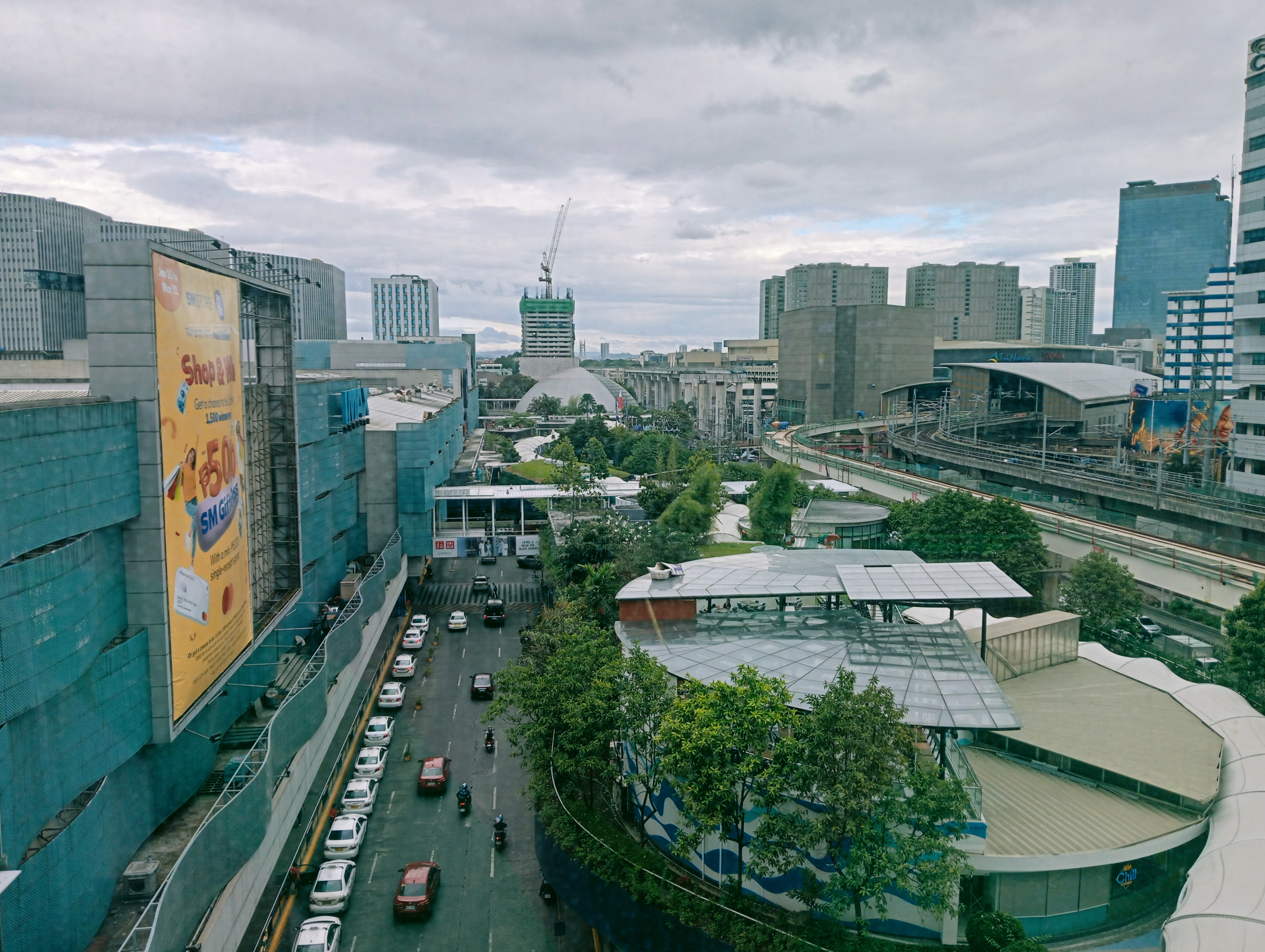
Main Mall (left) and Sky Garden (right)

Opened on May 24, 2009, The Sky Garden is a long, elevated, curvilinear park whose water features include two bubblers, a simulated river flowing through the central part of the park, and waterfalls at the end of the second floor. The Sky Garden also incorporates the Sky Dome, a 1,500-seat events venue with a floor area of 1,155 m^{2} (12,430 sq ft). The ground floor of The Sky Garden is used for vehicle parking and also serves as a transport terminal for UV Express, jeepneys, city buses, and Premium Point-to-Point (P2P) buses offering transport to various destinations in Bulacan.

== Features outside the main mall complex ==
=== SM Cyber West Avenue ===
The SM Cyber West Avenue is a 15-level structure covering more than 42,000 m^{2} (450,000 sq ft) of which around 22,700 m^{2} (244,000 sq ft) is office space targeted primarily at business process outsourcing companies. The remaining leasable areas on the ground and second levels feature a Savemore supermarket and other retail and commercial establishments.

Sited on a 2,910-square-meter (31,300 sq ft) property at the corner of the main EDSA thoroughfare and West Avenue, the building is linked via a footbridge to the SM North EDSA complex, as well as to the proposed North Triangle Common Station.

=== Grass Residences ===
A 43-floor, three-tower condominium complex, the Grass Residences was developed by SM Development Corporation (SMDC). Two further Towers on the site named Wilmington and Berkshire are together known as the Fern Residences.

=== SM North EDSA Busway Station ===
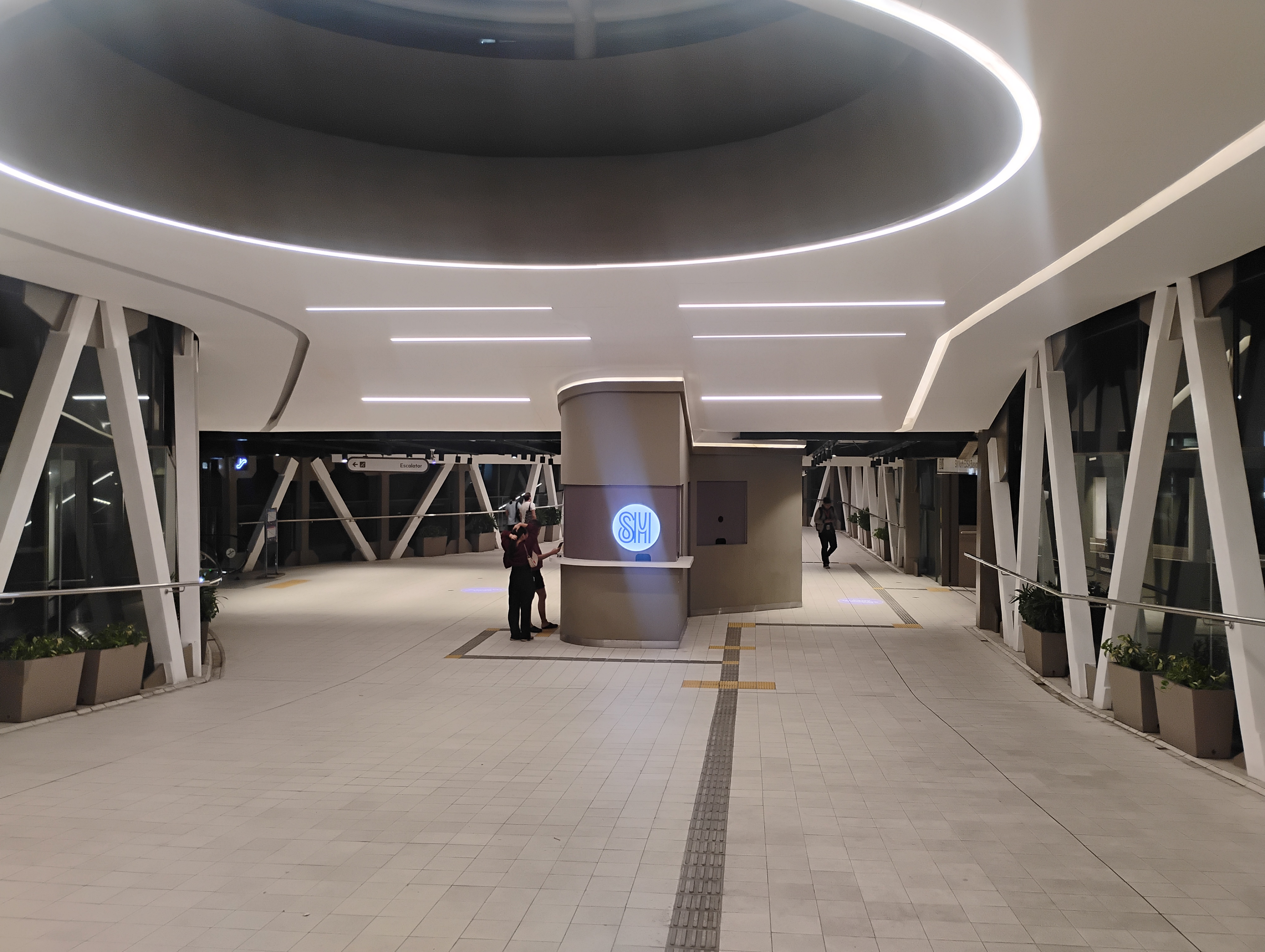
SM North EDSA Busway Concourse

Located on the EDSA Busway serving the EDSA Carousel line, the SM North EDSA Busway Station was inaugurated in 2024 by Transportation Secretary Jaime Bautista. The existing SM North EDSA / Cyber West footbridge was closed in January 2024 and later demolished to make way for the project, which was partially opened in early 2025. A new pedestrian footbridge now connects the mall with SM Cyber West.

The station was formally opened on March 13, 2025, making it the third station of the EDSA Busway Concourse Project to have a concierge, ticketing booths, and turnstiles for the automatic fare collection system.

== Incidents and accidents ==
=== City Center ===
- September 14, 2011: Two persons were shot by a woman.
- December 15, 2013: A holdup and shootout occurred when the notorious local Martilyo Gang robbed a jewelry store on the first floor of The SM Store North EDSA, employing their trademark modus operandi of using hammers to smash showcases and steal valuables.
- July 16, 2017: A fire broke out at the department store around 8:45 pm on a Sunday evening and reached the 3rd alarm.

=== The Annex ===
- May 6, 2015: A reportedly depressed 25-year-old man fell to his death from the building's third floor.
- April 5, 2018: A customer at the PC Home Service Center in the Cyberzone succumbed to nine stab wounds on various parts of his body after being stabbed by the store manager and head technician of the store. The customer had wanted to claim his laptop despite not holding a claim stub.
- April 16, 2018: A woman jumped to her death from the building's fourth level.
- October 5, 2019: A senior high school student from the nearby San Francisco High School fell to his death from the fifth floor.

=== The Block ===
- January 8, 2010: Two men were injured after a portion of the sunroof of the building collapsed. One man was taken to the emergency room of the Capitol Medical Center for treatment.
- January 16, 2016: An elevator operator died after falling from the fifth floor.

=== Footbridges ===
- July 12, 2023: A security guard was captured on video hurling a puppy from a footbridge while shooing away children. The puppy was later rushed to a nearby veterinary clinic but succumbed to its injuries. The guard was subsequently dismissed from his post.

== Gallery ==
=== Old mall ===
Old facade of the City Center/Main Building

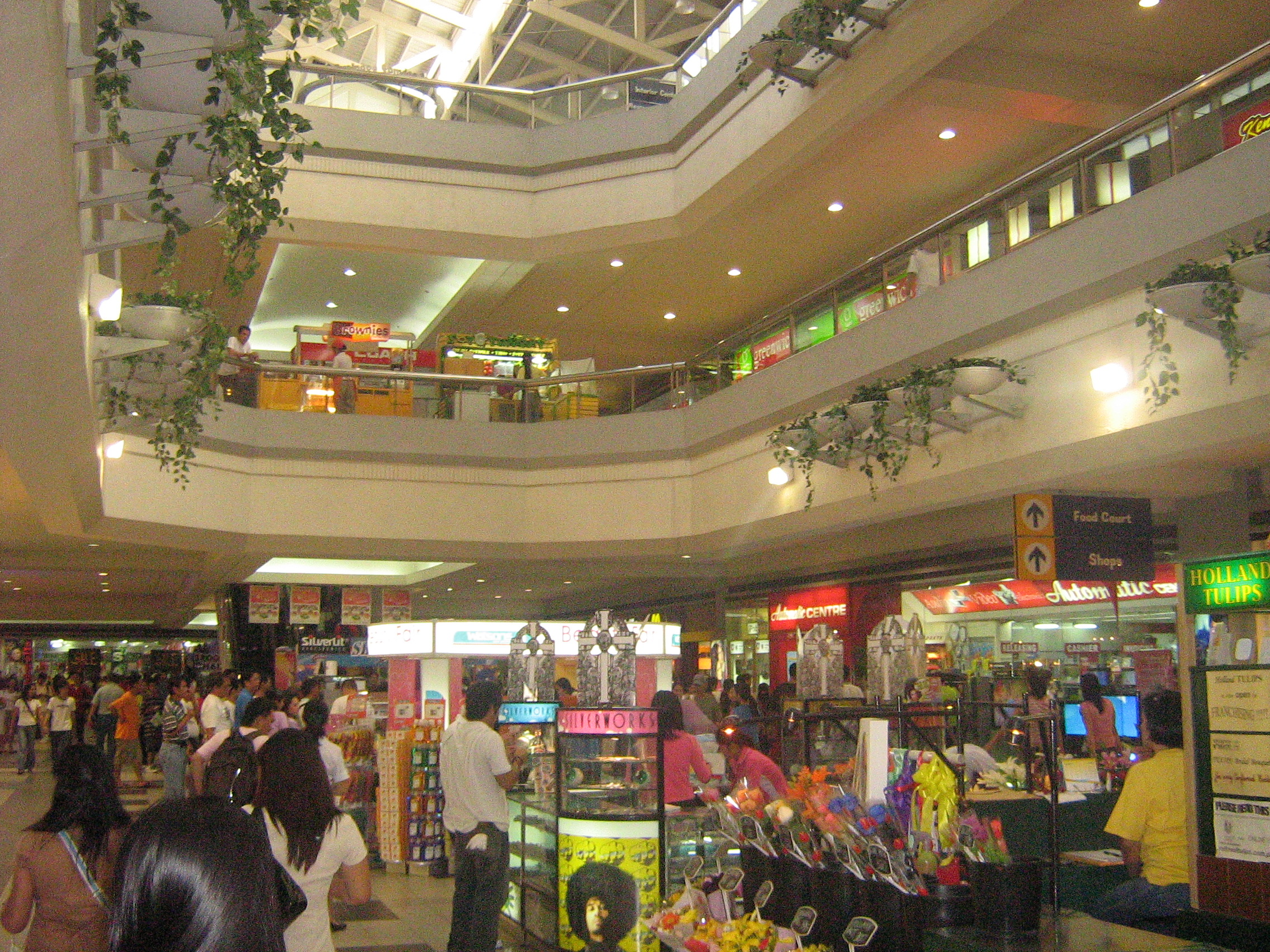
Old City Center Atrium

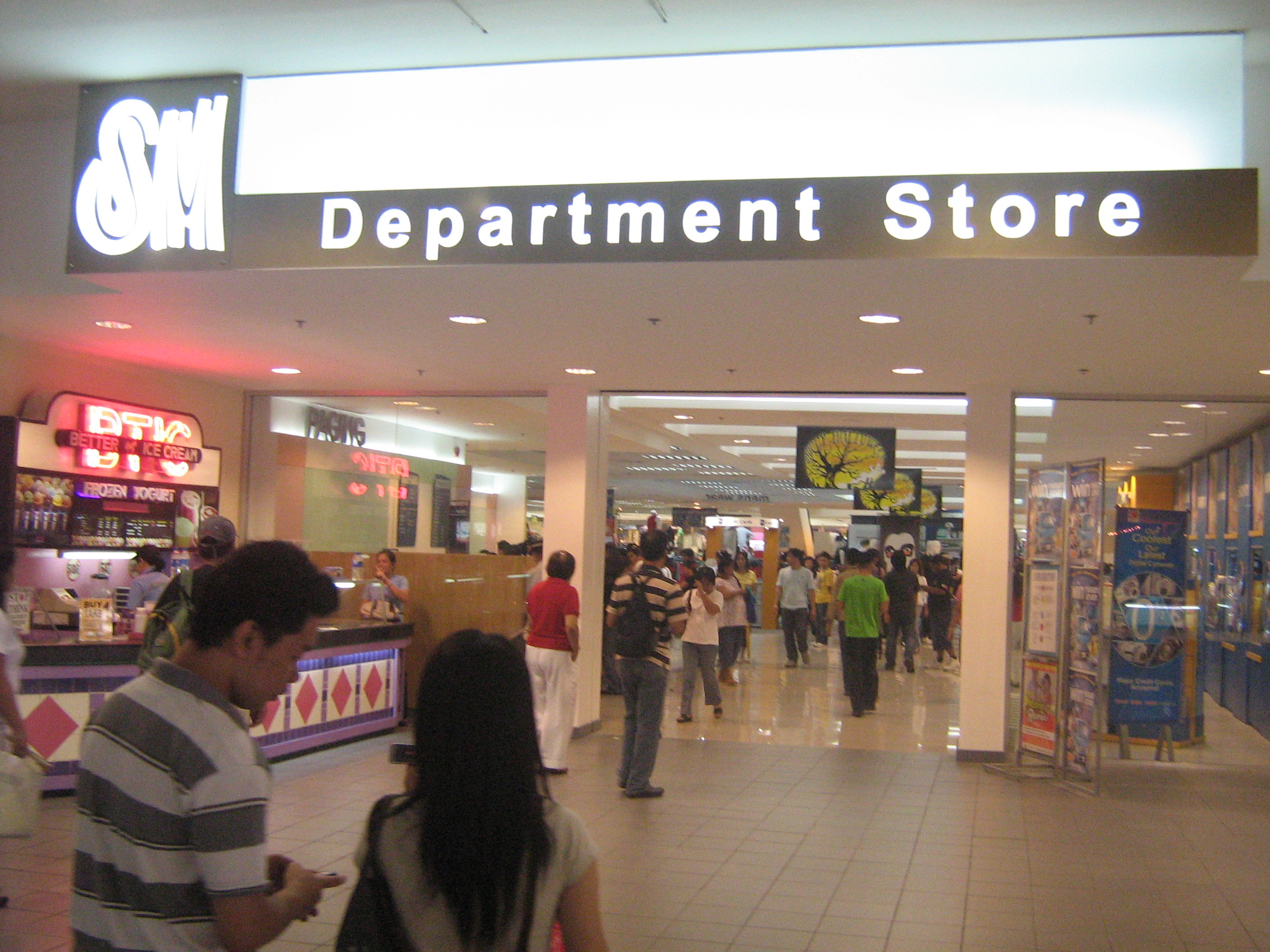
Old SM Department Store

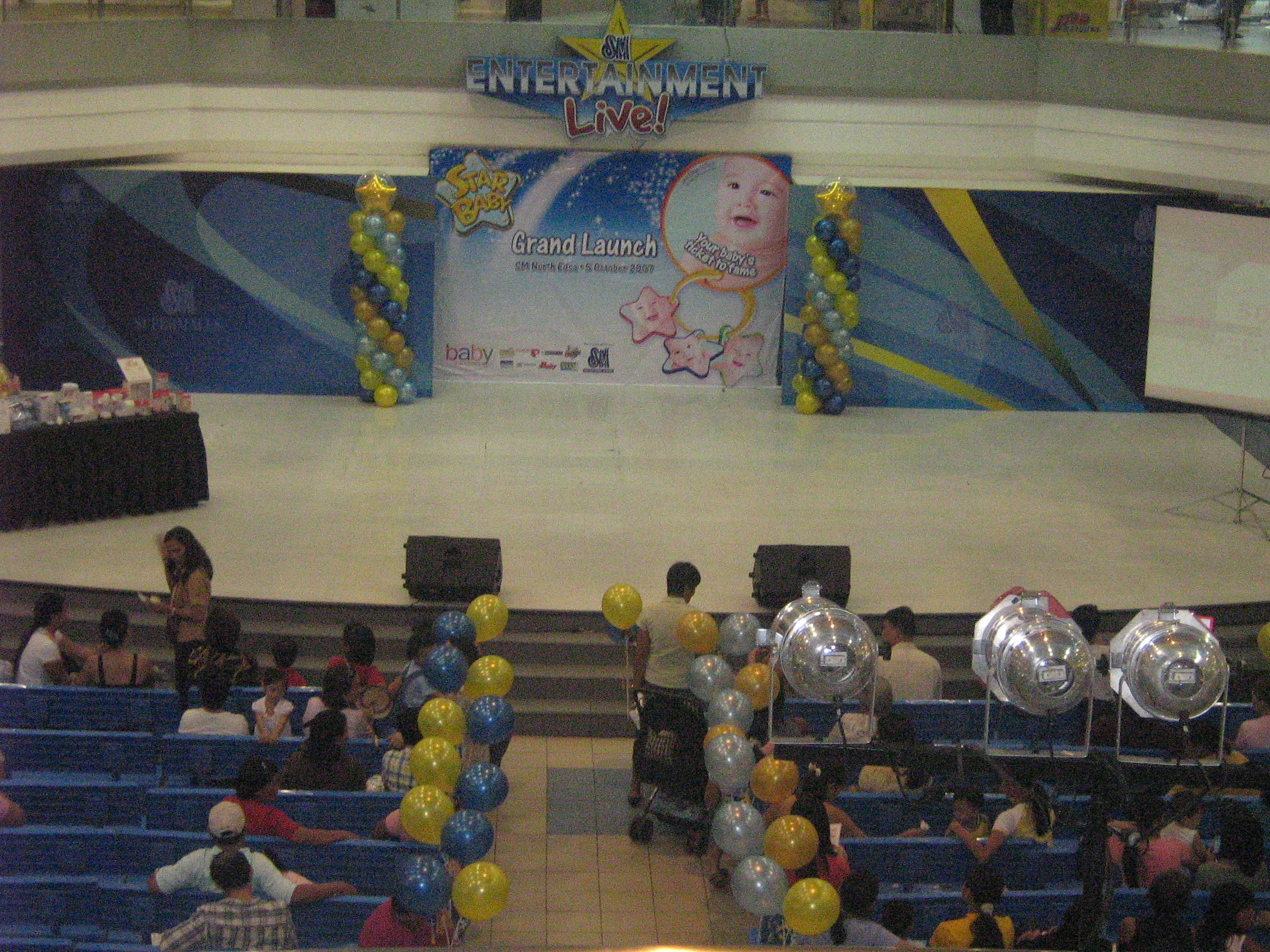
The former Entertainment Plaza

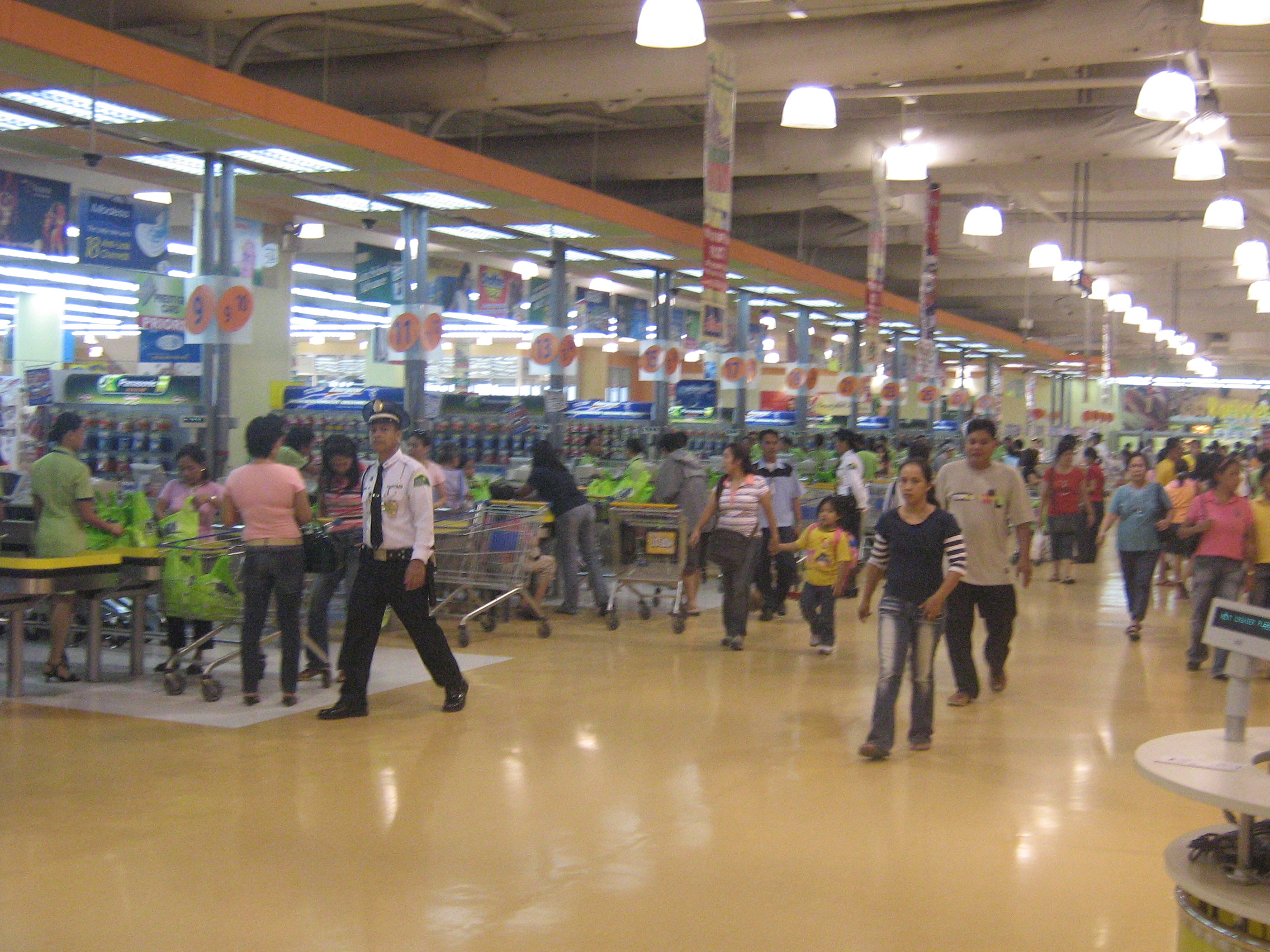
SM Hypermarket at The Block, now part of Food Circuit.

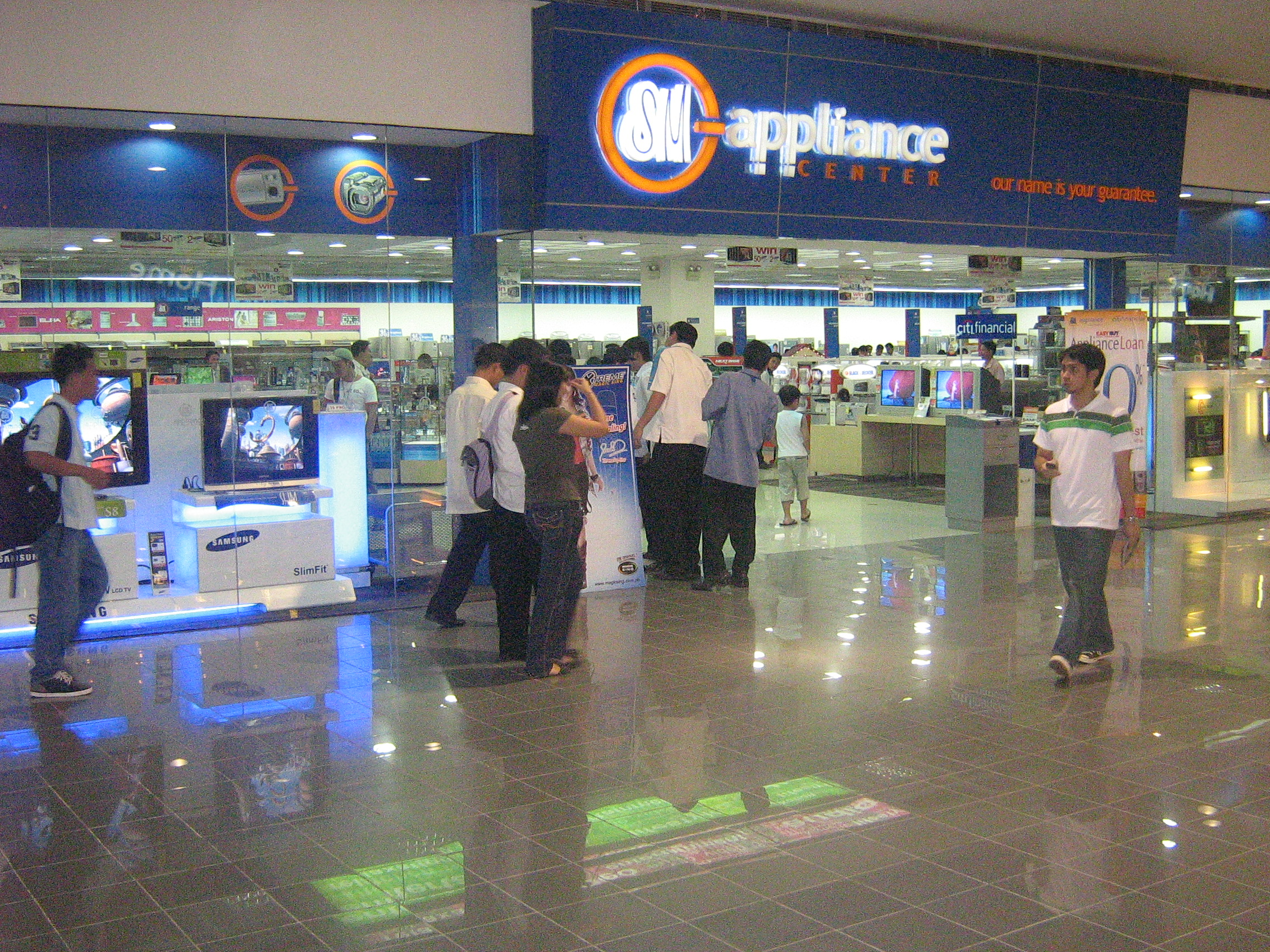
Old Appliance Center at The Block (now occupied by Uniqlo and relocated at the 4th floor)

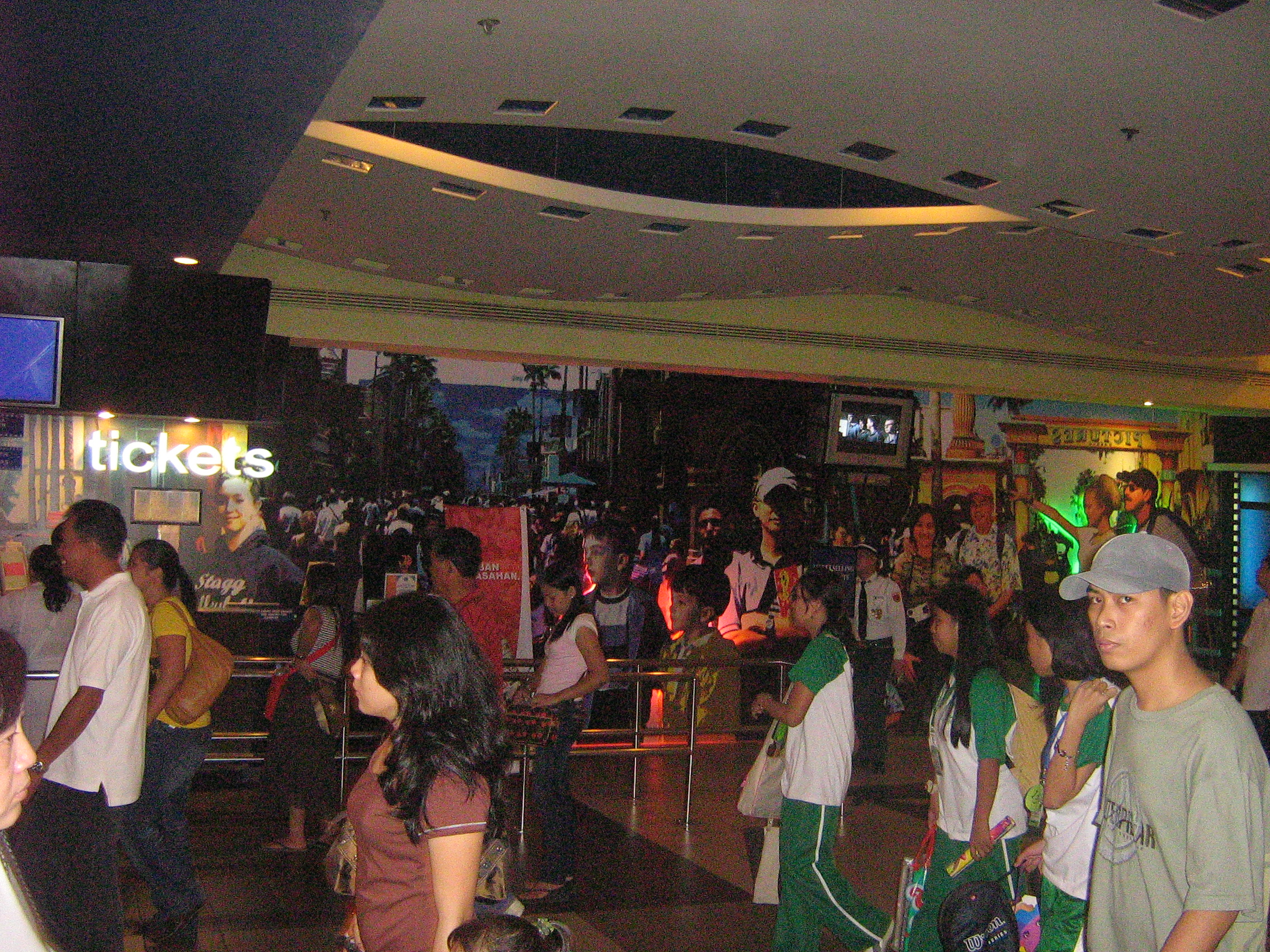
Old SM Cinema

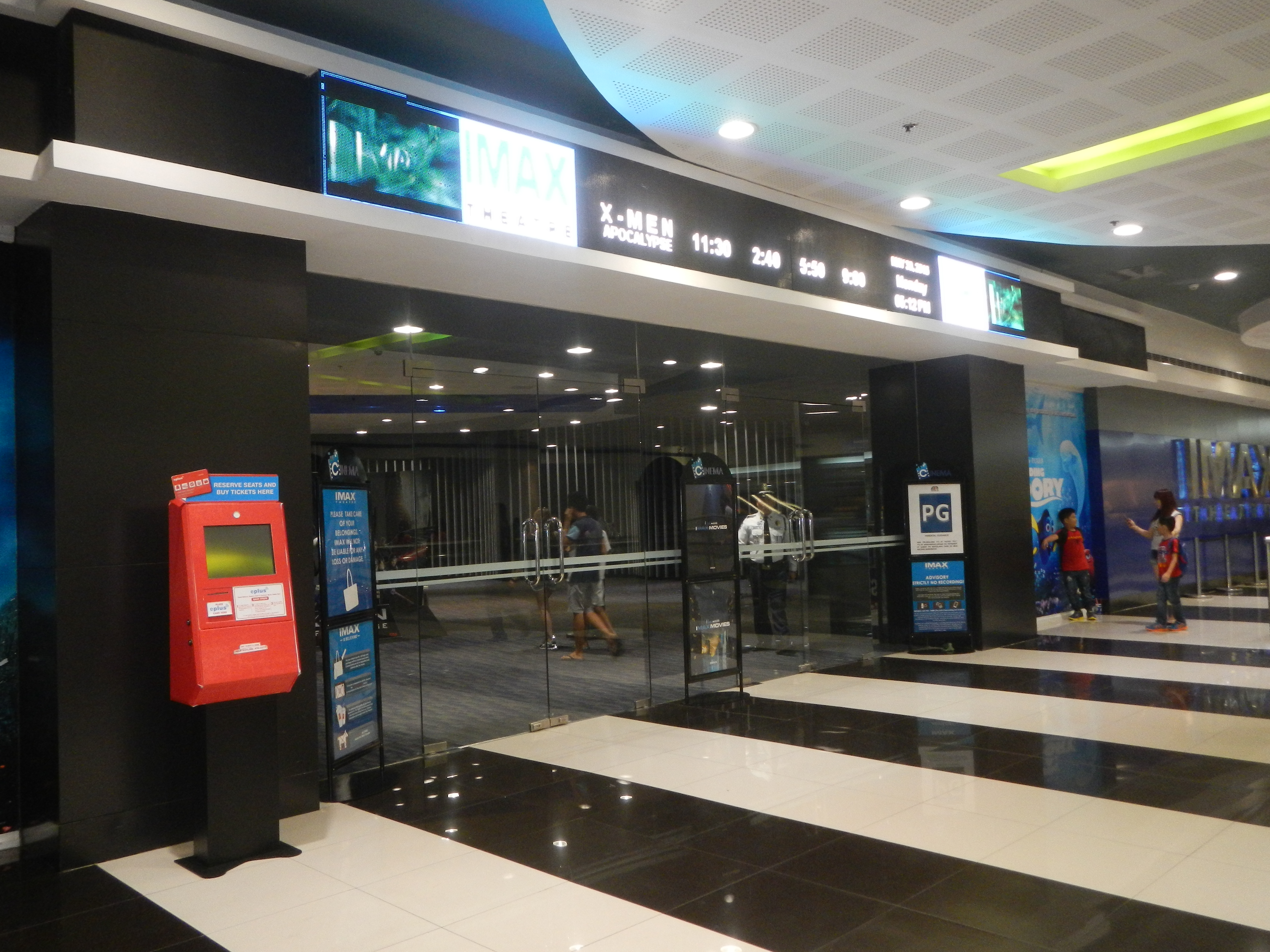
IMAX Theater (old entrance)

Old Cyberzone (now occupied by the Interior Zone)

=== Redevelopments ===
The Sky Garden in 2009

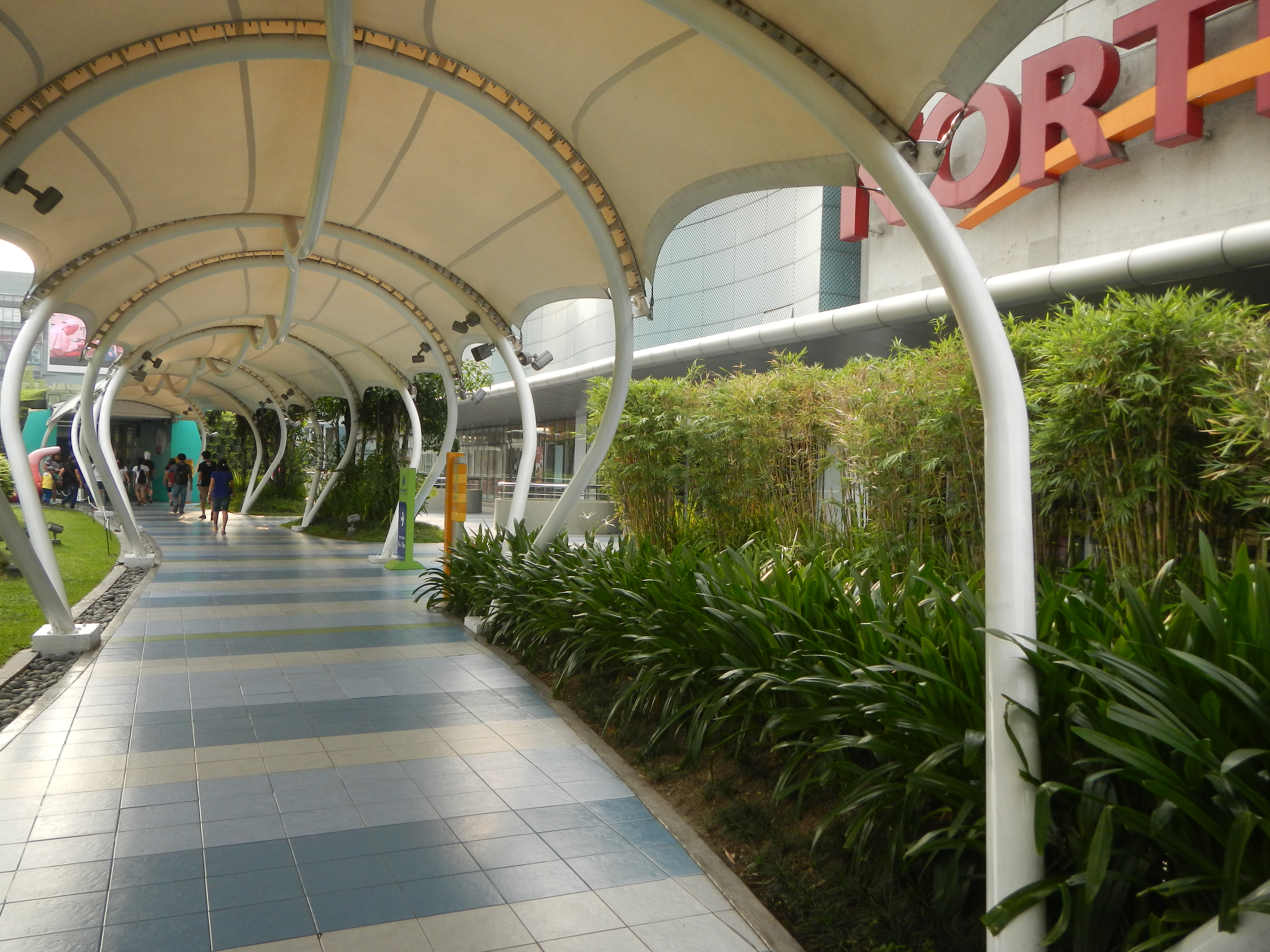
Sky Garden Walkway

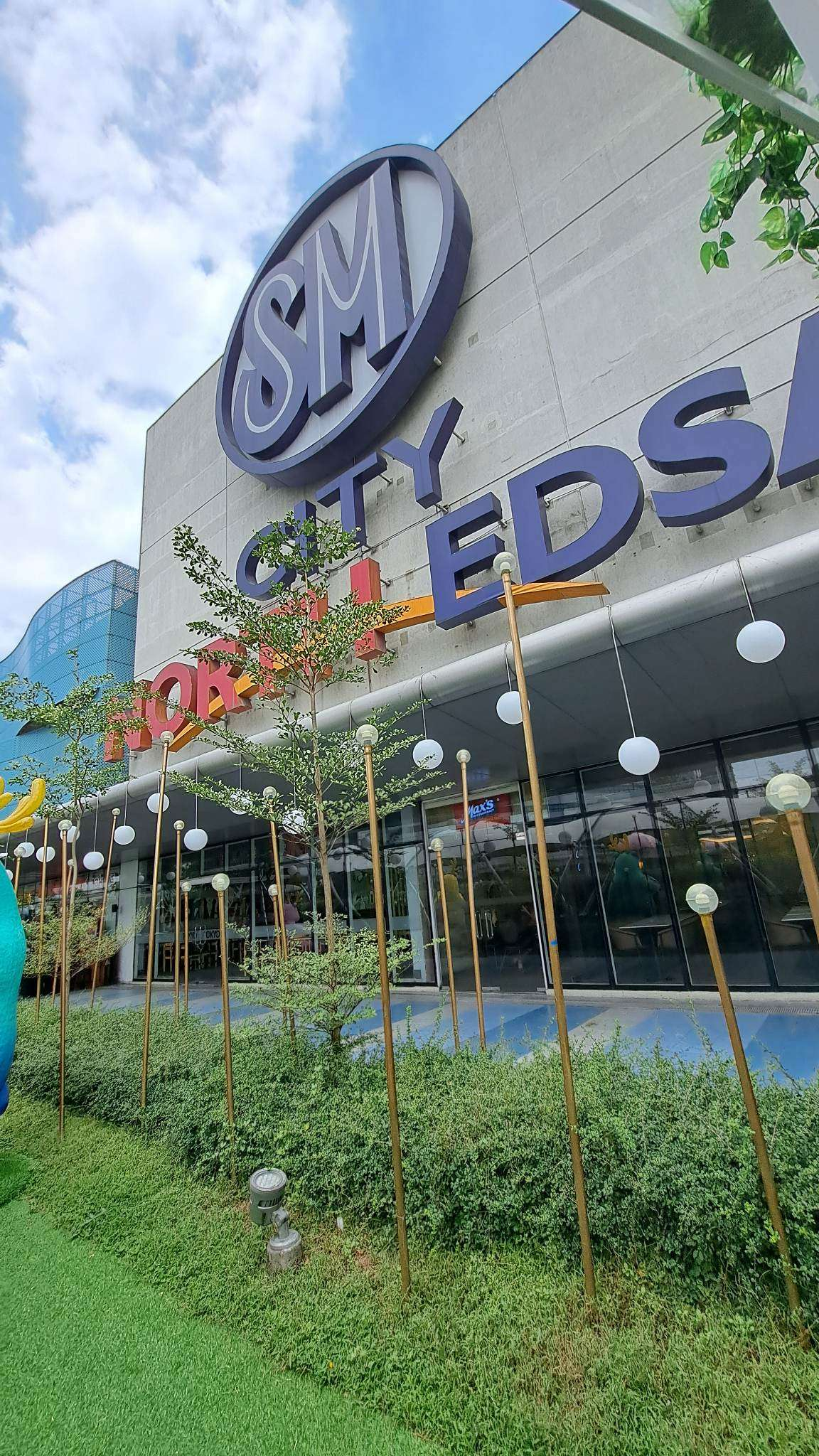
SM North EDSA's 2010–23 logo from Sky Garden

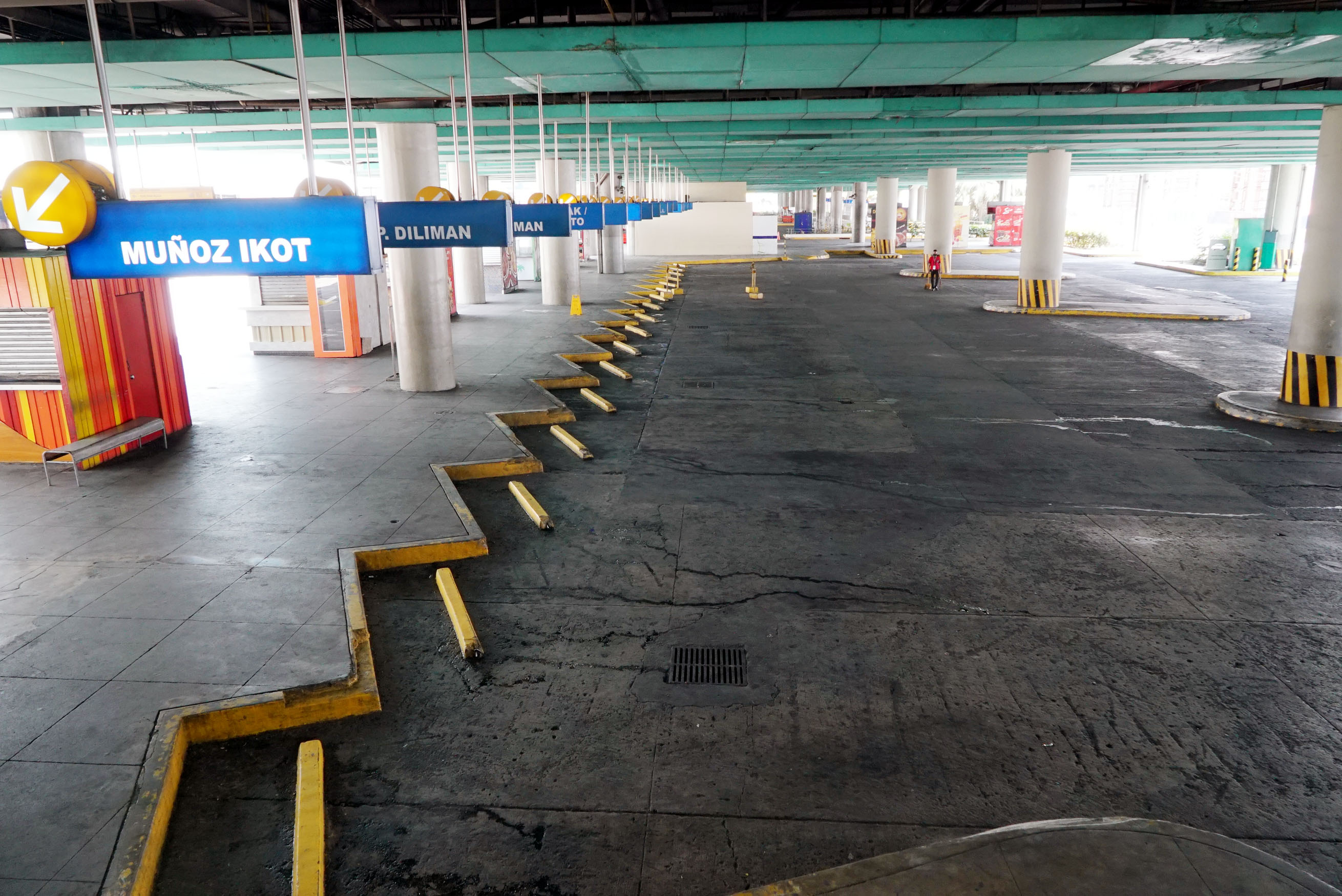
Transport terminal beneath Sky Garden

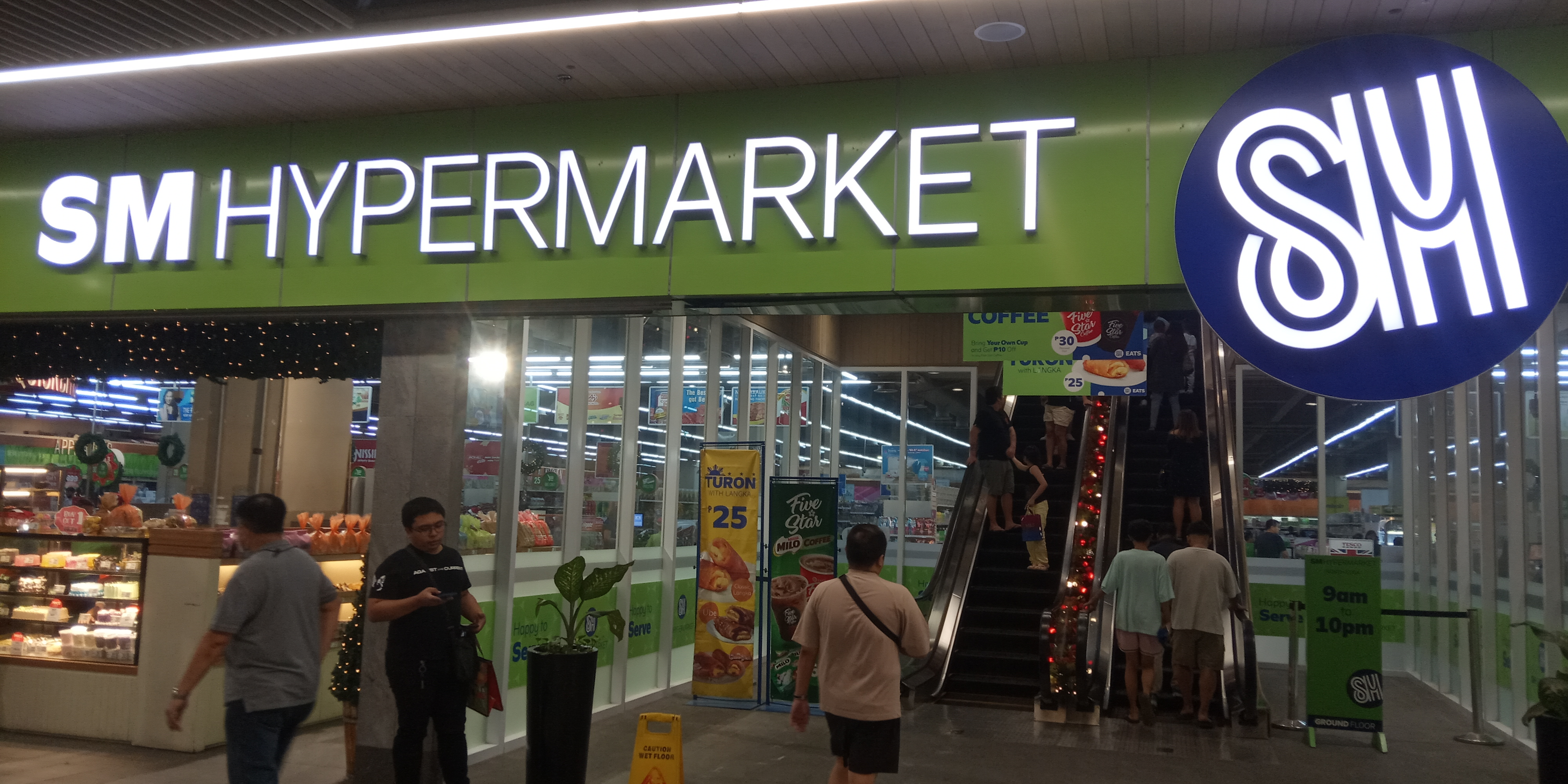
SM Hypermarket North EDSA

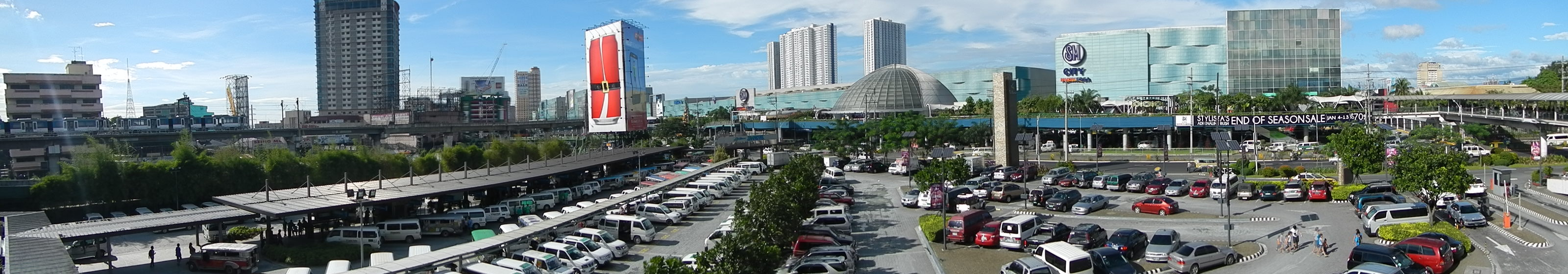
A panorama of SM North EDSA (2013)

A Starbucks outlet and a pond at the Sky Garden

== See also ==
- List of largest shopping malls
- List of shopping malls in Metro Manila
- List of shopping malls in the Philippines

== Bibliography ==
- Pocock, Emil (January 10, 2007). "World's Largest Shopping Malls". American Studies at Eastern Connecticut State University: Shopping Mall Studies. Eastern Connecticut State University. Archived from the original on February 13, 2007.

First	1st SM Supermall; 1985	Succeeded by SM City Sta. Mesa
