= Tatalon =

Barangay in Quezon City, Metro Manila, Philippines

- Barangay
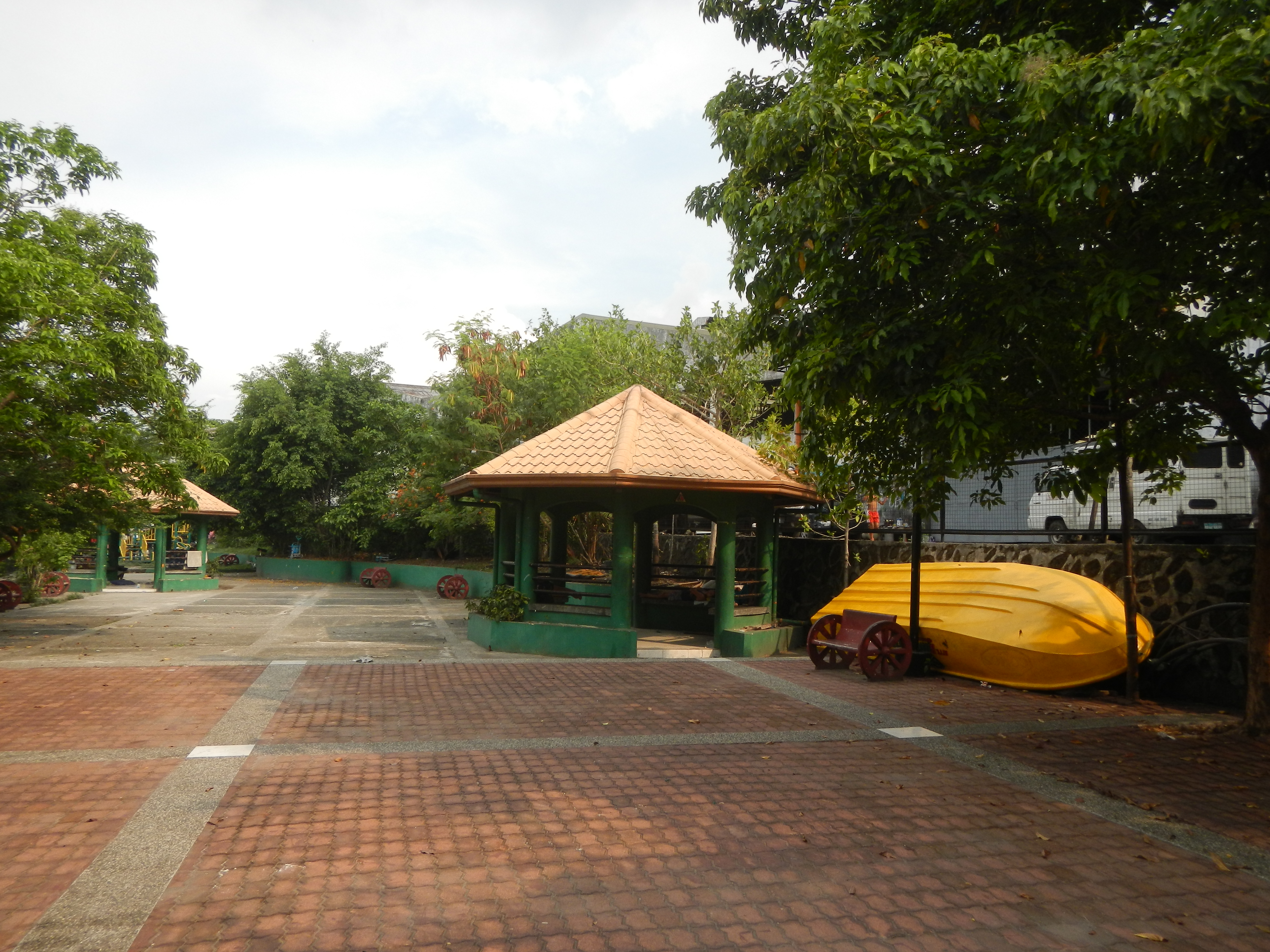
- People's Park

- Location within Metro Manila Location within Philippines
- Coordinates: 14°37′27″N 121°00′55″E
- Country: Philippines
- Region: National Capital Region
- City: Quezon City
- District: 4th District
- Established: 1960

Government
  - Type: Barangay
  - Barangay Captain: Rodel N. Lobo

Population (2020)
  - Total: 55,404
- Time zone: UTC+8 (PST)

Tatalon is a barangay of Quezon City, Philippines. According to 2020 Census, it has a population of 55,404 people.

== History ==
Tatalon was originally a part of Caloocan but it was carved out of the city in 1939 pursuant to Commonwealth Act No. 502, which created Quezon City as the capital of the Philippines, along with the following sitios and barrios: Balingasa, Kaingin, Kangkong, La Loma, Malamig, Matalahib, Masambong, San Isidro, San Jose and Santol.

== Geography ==
Tatalon is one of the city's low-lying areas and is susceptible to flooding. The place is also prone to liquefaction.
