= Quezon City's 1st congressional district =

Legislative district of the Philippines

- Constituency for the House of Representatives of the Philippines
- Interactive map of the district boundaries
- City: Quezon City
- Region: Metro Manila
- Population: 384,384 (2020)
- Electorate: 217,676 (2025)
- Major settlements: 38 barangays: Alicia, Bagong Pag-asa, Bahay Toro, Balingasa, Bungad, Damar, Damayan, Del Monte, Katipunan, Lourdes, Maharlika, Manresa, Mariblo, Masambong, N.S. Amoranto, Nayong Kanluran, Paang Bundok, Pag-ibig sa Nayon, Paltok, Paraiso, Phil-Am, Project 6, Ramon Magsaysay, Saint Peter, Salvacion, San Antonio, San Isidro Labrador, San Jose, Santa Cruz, Santa Teresita, Santo Cristo, Santo Domingo, Siena, Talayan, Vasra, Veterans Village, West Triangle
- Area: 19.59 km^{2} (7.56 sq mi)

Current constituency
- Created: 1987
- Representative: Arjo Atayde
- Political party: NUP; SBP
- Congressional bloc: Majority

Quezon City's 1st congressional district is one of the six congressional districts of the Philippines in Quezon City. It has been represented in the House of Representatives of the Philippines since 1987. The district consists of the western barangays bordering Manila and the southern enclave of Caloocan, and to the north of Quezon Avenue. The neighborhoods of La Loma, San Francisco del Monte and Santa Mesa Heights are in this district. It is currently represented in the 20th Congress by Arjo Atayde of the National Unity Party (NUP) and Serbisyo sa Bayan Party (SBP).

== Representation history ==
#	Image	Member	Term of office		Congress	Party	Electoral history	Constituent LGUs
#	Image	Member	Start	End	Congress	Party	Electoral history	Constituent LGUs
=== Quezon City's 1st district for the House of Representatives of the Philippines ===
District created February 2, 1987.
1		Renato Yap	June 30, 1987	June 30, 1995	8th	PDP–Laban	Elected in 1987.	1987–present Alicia, Bagong Pag-asa, Bahay Toro, Balingasa, Bungad, Damar, Damayan, Del Monte, Katipunan, Lourdes, Maharlika, Manresa, Mariblo, Masambong, N.S. Amoranto, Nayong Kanluran, Paang Bundok, Pag-ibig sa Nayon, Paltok, Paraiso, Phil-Am, Project 6, Ramon Magsaysay, Saint Peter, Salvacion, San Antonio, San Isidro Labrador, San Jose, Santa Cruz, Santa Teresita, Santo Cristo, Santo Domingo, Siena, Talayan, Vasra, Veterans Village, West Triangle
1		Renato Yap	June 30, 1987	June 30, 1995	9th	LDP	Re-elected in 1992.	1987–present Alicia, Bagong Pag-asa, Bahay Toro, Balingasa, Bungad, Damar, Damayan, Del Monte, Katipunan, Lourdes, Maharlika, Manresa, Mariblo, Masambong, N.S. Amoranto, Nayong Kanluran, Paang Bundok, Pag-ibig sa Nayon, Paltok, Paraiso, Phil-Am, Project 6, Ramon Magsaysay, Saint Peter, Salvacion, San Antonio, San Isidro Labrador, San Jose, Santa Cruz, Santa Teresita, Santo Cristo, Santo Domingo, Siena, Talayan, Vasra, Veterans Village, West Triangle
2		Reynaldo Calalay	June 30, 1995	January 11, 2003	10th	PRP	Re-elected in 1995.	1987–present Alicia, Bagong Pag-asa, Bahay Toro, Balingasa, Bungad, Damar, Damayan, Del Monte, Katipunan, Lourdes, Maharlika, Manresa, Mariblo, Masambong, N.S. Amoranto, Nayong Kanluran, Paang Bundok, Pag-ibig sa Nayon, Paltok, Paraiso, Phil-Am, Project 6, Ramon Magsaysay, Saint Peter, Salvacion, San Antonio, San Isidro Labrador, San Jose, Santa Cruz, Santa Teresita, Santo Cristo, Santo Domingo, Siena, Talayan, Vasra, Veterans Village, West Triangle
2		Reynaldo Calalay	June 30, 1995	January 11, 2003	11th	PMP	Re-elected in 1998.	1987–present Alicia, Bagong Pag-asa, Bahay Toro, Balingasa, Bungad, Damar, Damayan, Del Monte, Katipunan, Lourdes, Maharlika, Manresa, Mariblo, Masambong, N.S. Amoranto, Nayong Kanluran, Paang Bundok, Pag-ibig sa Nayon, Paltok, Paraiso, Phil-Am, Project 6, Ramon Magsaysay, Saint Peter, Salvacion, San Antonio, San Isidro Labrador, San Jose, Santa Cruz, Santa Teresita, Santo Cristo, Santo Domingo, Siena, Talayan, Vasra, Veterans Village, West Triangle
2		Reynaldo Calalay	June 30, 1995	January 11, 2003	12th	LDP	Re-elected in 2001. Died.	1987–present Alicia, Bagong Pag-asa, Bahay Toro, Balingasa, Bungad, Damar, Damayan, Del Monte, Katipunan, Lourdes, Maharlika, Manresa, Mariblo, Masambong, N.S. Amoranto, Nayong Kanluran, Paang Bundok, Pag-ibig sa Nayon, Paltok, Paraiso, Phil-Am, Project 6, Ramon Magsaysay, Saint Peter, Salvacion, San Antonio, San Isidro Labrador, San Jose, Santa Cruz, Santa Teresita, Santo Cristo, Santo Domingo, Siena, Talayan, Vasra, Veterans Village, West Triangle
-	Vacant		January 11, 2003	June 30, 2004	12th	No special election to fill vacancy.		1987–present Alicia, Bagong Pag-asa, Bahay Toro, Balingasa, Bungad, Damar, Damayan, Del Monte, Katipunan, Lourdes, Maharlika, Manresa, Mariblo, Masambong, N.S. Amoranto, Nayong Kanluran, Paang Bundok, Pag-ibig sa Nayon, Paltok, Paraiso, Phil-Am, Project 6, Ramon Magsaysay, Saint Peter, Salvacion, San Antonio, San Isidro Labrador, San Jose, Santa Cruz, Santa Teresita, Santo Cristo, Santo Domingo, Siena, Talayan, Vasra, Veterans Village, West Triangle
3		Vincent Crisologo	June 30, 2004	June 30, 2013	13th	LDP	Elected in 2004.	1987–present Alicia, Bagong Pag-asa, Bahay Toro, Balingasa, Bungad, Damar, Damayan, Del Monte, Katipunan, Lourdes, Maharlika, Manresa, Mariblo, Masambong, N.S. Amoranto, Nayong Kanluran, Paang Bundok, Pag-ibig sa Nayon, Paltok, Paraiso, Phil-Am, Project 6, Ramon Magsaysay, Saint Peter, Salvacion, San Antonio, San Isidro Labrador, San Jose, Santa Cruz, Santa Teresita, Santo Cristo, Santo Domingo, Siena, Talayan, Vasra, Veterans Village, West Triangle
3		Vincent Crisologo	June 30, 2004	June 30, 2013	14th	Nacionalista	Re-elected in 2007.	1987–present Alicia, Bagong Pag-asa, Bahay Toro, Balingasa, Bungad, Damar, Damayan, Del Monte, Katipunan, Lourdes, Maharlika, Manresa, Mariblo, Masambong, N.S. Amoranto, Nayong Kanluran, Paang Bundok, Pag-ibig sa Nayon, Paltok, Paraiso, Phil-Am, Project 6, Ramon Magsaysay, Saint Peter, Salvacion, San Antonio, San Isidro Labrador, San Jose, Santa Cruz, Santa Teresita, Santo Cristo, Santo Domingo, Siena, Talayan, Vasra, Veterans Village, West Triangle
3		Vincent Crisologo	June 30, 2004	June 30, 2013	15th	UNA	Re-elected in 2010.	1987–present Alicia, Bagong Pag-asa, Bahay Toro, Balingasa, Bungad, Damar, Damayan, Del Monte, Katipunan, Lourdes, Maharlika, Manresa, Mariblo, Masambong, N.S. Amoranto, Nayong Kanluran, Paang Bundok, Pag-ibig sa Nayon, Paltok, Paraiso, Phil-Am, Project 6, Ramon Magsaysay, Saint Peter, Salvacion, San Antonio, San Isidro Labrador, San Jose, Santa Cruz, Santa Teresita, Santo Cristo, Santo Domingo, Siena, Talayan, Vasra, Veterans Village, West Triangle
4		Francisco Calalay	June 30, 2013	June 30, 2016	16th	Liberal	Elected in 2013.	1987–present Alicia, Bagong Pag-asa, Bahay Toro, Balingasa, Bungad, Damar, Damayan, Del Monte, Katipunan, Lourdes, Maharlika, Manresa, Mariblo, Masambong, N.S. Amoranto, Nayong Kanluran, Paang Bundok, Pag-ibig sa Nayon, Paltok, Paraiso, Phil-Am, Project 6, Ramon Magsaysay, Saint Peter, Salvacion, San Antonio, San Isidro Labrador, San Jose, Santa Cruz, Santa Teresita, Santo Cristo, Santo Domingo, Siena, Talayan, Vasra, Veterans Village, West Triangle
(3)		Vincent Crisologo	June 30, 2016	June 30, 2019	17th	UNA	Elected in 2016.	1987–present Alicia, Bagong Pag-asa, Bahay Toro, Balingasa, Bungad, Damar, Damayan, Del Monte, Katipunan, Lourdes, Maharlika, Manresa, Mariblo, Masambong, N.S. Amoranto, Nayong Kanluran, Paang Bundok, Pag-ibig sa Nayon, Paltok, Paraiso, Phil-Am, Project 6, Ramon Magsaysay, Saint Peter, Salvacion, San Antonio, San Isidro Labrador, San Jose, Santa Cruz, Santa Teresita, Santo Cristo, Santo Domingo, Siena, Talayan, Vasra, Veterans Village, West Triangle
(3)		Vincent Crisologo	June 30, 2016	June 30, 2019	17th	PDP–Laban	Elected in 2016.	1987–present Alicia, Bagong Pag-asa, Bahay Toro, Balingasa, Bungad, Damar, Damayan, Del Monte, Katipunan, Lourdes, Maharlika, Manresa, Mariblo, Masambong, N.S. Amoranto, Nayong Kanluran, Paang Bundok, Pag-ibig sa Nayon, Paltok, Paraiso, Phil-Am, Project 6, Ramon Magsaysay, Saint Peter, Salvacion, San Antonio, San Isidro Labrador, San Jose, Santa Cruz, Santa Teresita, Santo Cristo, Santo Domingo, Siena, Talayan, Vasra, Veterans Village, West Triangle
5		Anthony Peter Crisologo	June 30, 2019	June 30, 2022	18th	PDP–Laban	Elected in 2019.	1987–present Alicia, Bagong Pag-asa, Bahay Toro, Balingasa, Bungad, Damar, Damayan, Del Monte, Katipunan, Lourdes, Maharlika, Manresa, Mariblo, Masambong, N.S. Amoranto, Nayong Kanluran, Paang Bundok, Pag-ibig sa Nayon, Paltok, Paraiso, Phil-Am, Project 6, Ramon Magsaysay, Saint Peter, Salvacion, San Antonio, San Isidro Labrador, San Jose, Santa Cruz, Santa Teresita, Santo Cristo, Santo Domingo, Siena, Talayan, Vasra, Veterans Village, West Triangle
5		Anthony Peter Crisologo	June 30, 2019	June 30, 2022	18th	NUP	Elected in 2019.	1987–present Alicia, Bagong Pag-asa, Bahay Toro, Balingasa, Bungad, Damar, Damayan, Del Monte, Katipunan, Lourdes, Maharlika, Manresa, Mariblo, Masambong, N.S. Amoranto, Nayong Kanluran, Paang Bundok, Pag-ibig sa Nayon, Paltok, Paraiso, Phil-Am, Project 6, Ramon Magsaysay, Saint Peter, Salvacion, San Antonio, San Isidro Labrador, San Jose, Santa Cruz, Santa Teresita, Santo Cristo, Santo Domingo, Siena, Talayan, Vasra, Veterans Village, West Triangle
5		Anthony Peter Crisologo	June 30, 2019	June 30, 2022	18th	Lakas	Elected in 2019.	1987–present Alicia, Bagong Pag-asa, Bahay Toro, Balingasa, Bungad, Damar, Damayan, Del Monte, Katipunan, Lourdes, Maharlika, Manresa, Mariblo, Masambong, N.S. Amoranto, Nayong Kanluran, Paang Bundok, Pag-ibig sa Nayon, Paltok, Paraiso, Phil-Am, Project 6, Ramon Magsaysay, Saint Peter, Salvacion, San Antonio, San Isidro Labrador, San Jose, Santa Cruz, Santa Teresita, Santo Cristo, Santo Domingo, Siena, Talayan, Vasra, Veterans Village, West Triangle
6		Arjo Atayde	June 30, 2022	Incumbent	19th	Independent (SBP)	Elected in 2022.	1987–present Alicia, Bagong Pag-asa, Bahay Toro, Balingasa, Bungad, Damar, Damayan, Del Monte, Katipunan, Lourdes, Maharlika, Manresa, Mariblo, Masambong, N.S. Amoranto, Nayong Kanluran, Paang Bundok, Pag-ibig sa Nayon, Paltok, Paraiso, Phil-Am, Project 6, Ramon Magsaysay, Saint Peter, Salvacion, San Antonio, San Isidro Labrador, San Jose, Santa Cruz, Santa Teresita, Santo Cristo, Santo Domingo, Siena, Talayan, Vasra, Veterans Village, West Triangle
6		Arjo Atayde	June 30, 2022	Incumbent	19th	Nacionalista (SBP)	Elected in 2022.	1987–present Alicia, Bagong Pag-asa, Bahay Toro, Balingasa, Bungad, Damar, Damayan, Del Monte, Katipunan, Lourdes, Maharlika, Manresa, Mariblo, Masambong, N.S. Amoranto, Nayong Kanluran, Paang Bundok, Pag-ibig sa Nayon, Paltok, Paraiso, Phil-Am, Project 6, Ramon Magsaysay, Saint Peter, Salvacion, San Antonio, San Isidro Labrador, San Jose, Santa Cruz, Santa Teresita, Santo Cristo, Santo Domingo, Siena, Talayan, Vasra, Veterans Village, West Triangle
6		Arjo Atayde	June 30, 2022	Incumbent	20th	NUP (SBP)	Re-elected in 2025.	1987–present Alicia, Bagong Pag-asa, Bahay Toro, Balingasa, Bungad, Damar, Damayan, Del Monte, Katipunan, Lourdes, Maharlika, Manresa, Mariblo, Masambong, N.S. Amoranto, Nayong Kanluran, Paang Bundok, Pag-ibig sa Nayon, Paltok, Paraiso, Phil-Am, Project 6, Ramon Magsaysay, Saint Peter, Salvacion, San Antonio, San Isidro Labrador, San Jose, Santa Cruz, Santa Teresita, Santo Cristo, Santo Domingo, Siena, Talayan, Vasra, Veterans Village, West Triangle

== Election results ==
=== 2010 ===
2010 Philippine House of Representatives elections
Party	Candidate	Votes	%
Nacionalista	Vincent "Bingbong" Crisologo	78,610	60.78
Independent	Vivienne Tan	30,599	23.66
NPC	Elizabeth Delarmante	19,671	15.21
Independent	Benjamin Mariquit	462	0.36
Valid ballots		129,342	94.78
Invalid or blank votes		7,127	5.22
Total votes		136,469	100.00
Nacionalista hold			

=== 2013 ===
2013 Philippine House of Representatives elections
Party	Candidate	Votes	%
Liberal	Francisco Calalay	62,226	47.70
UNA	Rita Crisologo	56,604	43.39
Independent	Gary Jamile	2,095	1.60
Margin of victory		5,622	4.31%
Valid ballots		120,925	92.70
Invalid or blank votes		9,529	7.30
Total votes		130,454	100.00
Liberal gain from UNA			

=== 2016 ===
2016 Philippine House of Representatives elections
Party	Candidate	Votes	%
UNA	Vincent "Bingbong" Crisologo	81,799	55.20
Liberal	Francisco "Boy" Calalay	57,056	38.50
Invalid or blank votes		9,342	6.30
Total votes		148,197	100.00
UNA gain from Liberal			

=== 2019 ===
2019 Philippine House of Representatives elections
Party	Candidate	Votes	%
PDP–Laban	Anthony Peter Crisologo	74,033	55.2
NPC	Elizabeth Delarmente	56,833	42.3
Independent	Andres Samson	3,327	2.5
Valid ballots		134,193	93.7
Invalid or blank votes		9,092	6.3
Total votes		134,193	100.00
PDP–Laban hold			

=== 2022 ===
2022 Philippine House of Representatives elections
Party	Candidate	Votes	%
Independent	Juan Carlos "Arjo" Atayde	111,742	66.85
Lakas	Anthony Peter "Onyx" Crisologo	52,554	31.45
Independent	Marcus Aurelius "Makinig sa Distrito" Dee	2,846	1.70
Total votes		168,224	100.00
Independent gain from Lakas			

=== 2025 ===
Candidate	Party	Votes	%
Arjo Atayde (incumbent)	Nacionalista Party	93,999	58.53
Vincent Crisologo	Partido Federal ng Pilipinas	66,606	41.47
Total		160,605	100.00
Registered voters/turnout		217,676	–
Nacionalista Party hold			
Source: Commission on Elections

== See also ==
- Legislative districts of Quezon City
