= Santa Cruz, Quezon City =

Barangay in Quezon City, Metro Manila, Philippines

Santa Cruz
- Barangay
- Fisher Mall

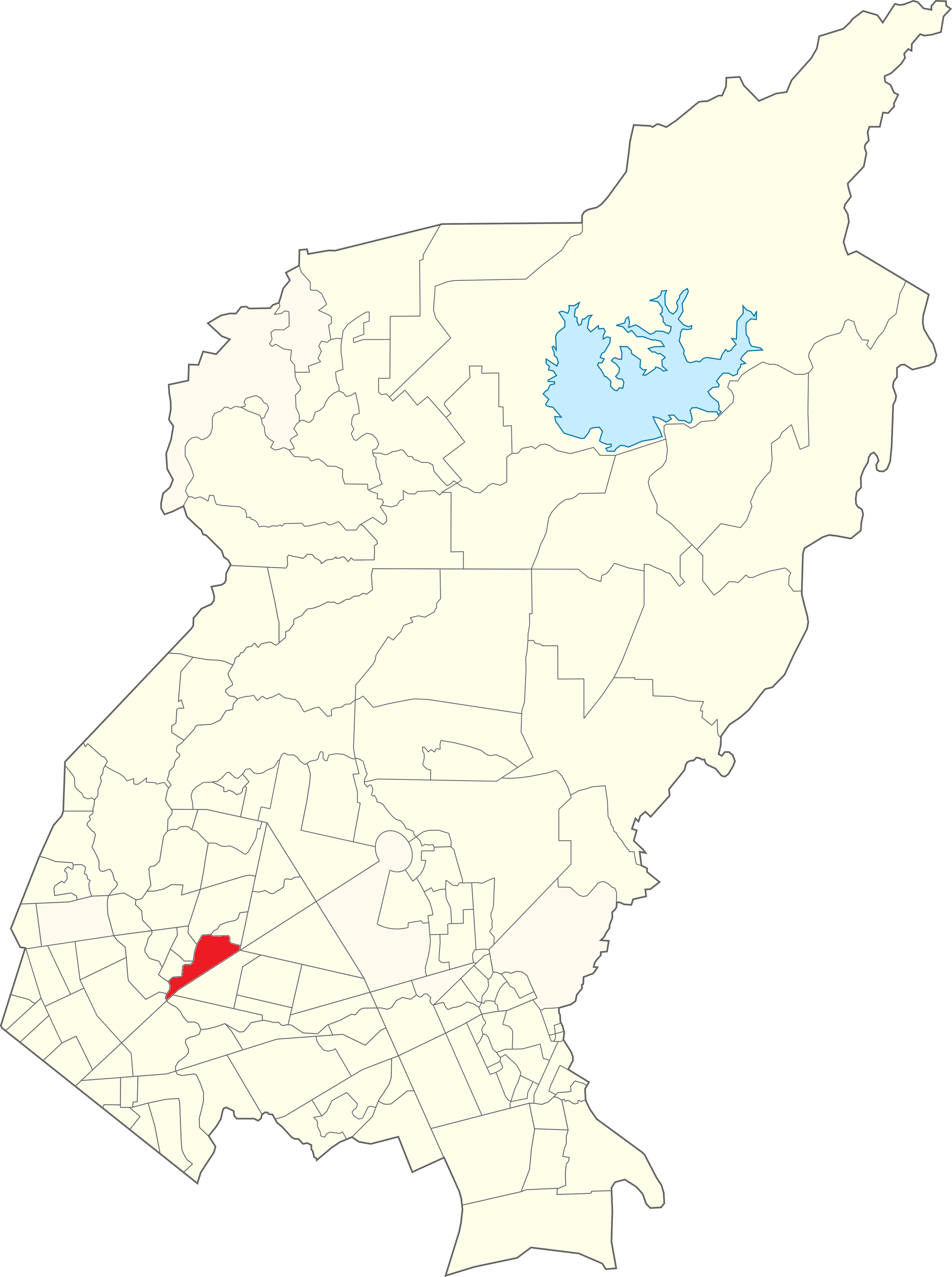
- Map of Quezon City showing Santa Cruz

- Location of Barangay Santa Cruz, Quezon City within Metro Manila
- Coordinates: 14°38′5″N 121°1′4″E
- Country: Philippines
- Region: National Capital Region
- City: Quezon City
- District: 1st District of Quezon City

Government
  - Type: Barangay
  - Barangay Chairman: Ernesto B. Baetiong Sr.
- Time zone: UTC+8 (PST)
- Zip Code: 1104
- Area code: 02

Santa Cruz, often abbreviated as Sta. Cruz is a barangay located in the San Francisco Del Monte district of Quezon City. It has an approximate land area of 44 hectares and is bounded by South and West Triangles in the East, Quezon Avenue and Barangay Paligsahan in the South, Nayong Kanluran in the Northeast and Barangay Paltok in the North.

Neighboring barangays include Mariblo, Paraiso, Paltok, Talayan, Sto. Domingo, Paligsahan, and the West and South Triangles are under the first and fourth Legislative districts in Quezon City, Metro Manila, Philippines.

Its barangay hall is near the Mariblo bridge, separating the area from Barangay Mariblo.

== Landmarks ==
Fisher Mall, the former Pantranco bus terminal site, is located at the corner of Roosevelt and Quezon Avenues. At the same time, Halili School of Ballet and Phoenix Publishing House are found along Quezon Avenue. PMI Colleges also has a presence in the area.

Heroes Hill, encompassing more than three-fourths (3/4) of the entire barangay, is a closed gated community developed by Trans-American Sales and Exposition for former American soldiers in the Philippine-American War.

== Barangay and Sangguniang Kabataan officials ==
=== List of Punong Barangay ===
Full Name	Term Began	Term Ended
JOMAR A. BAETIONG	June 30, 2018	June 30, 2020
ERNESTO B. BAETIONG, SR.	November 30, 2013	June 30, 2018

=== Members of Sangguniang Barangay ===
Title	Name
Barangay Captain; Punong Barangay	Jomar A. Baetiong (unofficial)
SK Chairperson; Sangguniang Kabataan	
Secretary; Kalihim	
Treasurer; Ingat Yaman	
Barangay councilors Kagawad	

The new Barangay and SK Councils were elected on May 14, 2018.

== Demography ==
As of the 2015 census of the National Statistics Office (Philippines), the population of Santa Cruz is 4,784.

== See also ==
- Fisher Mall
- Barangays of Quezon City
- Legislative districts of Quezon City
- Quezon City
- Barangay elections
