= Fernando Poe Jr. Avenue =

National road in Quezon City, Philippines

Coordinates: 14°38′42″N 121°1′1″E

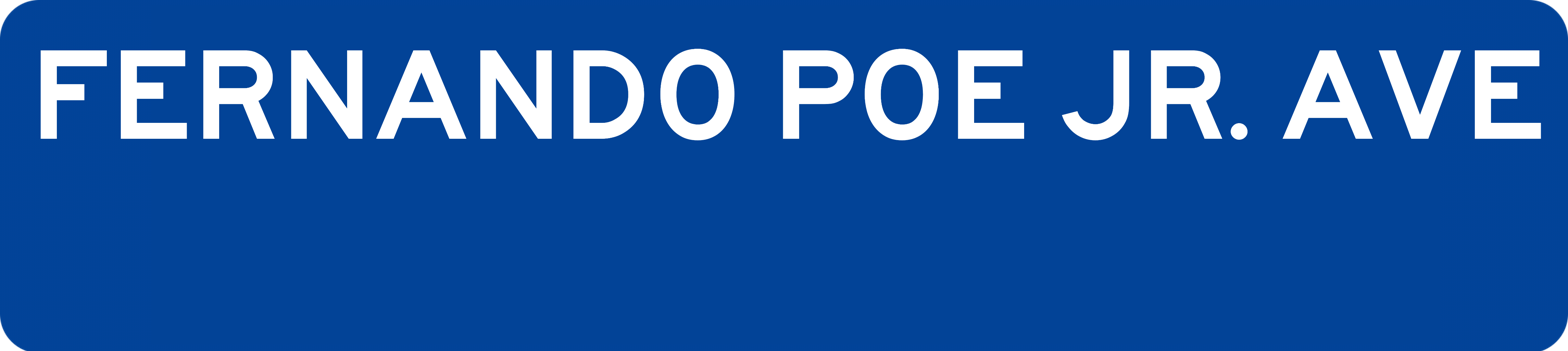
Fernando Poe Jr. Avenue
- FPJ Avenue; Roosevelt Avenue
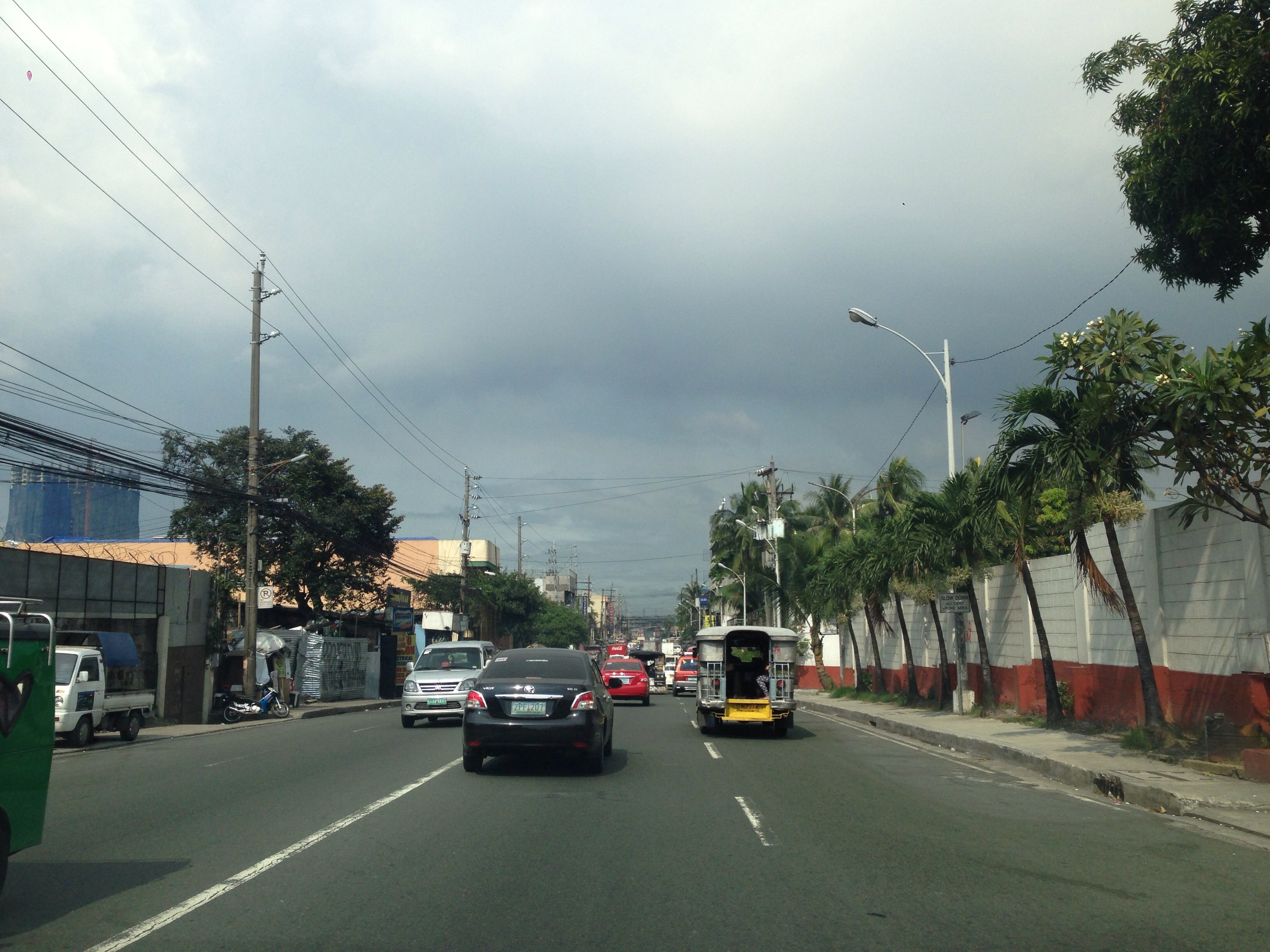
- The avenue looking north towards EDSA by the Coca-Cola warehouse

Route information
- Maintained by the Department of Public Works and Highways – Quezon City 1st District Engineering Office and Metropolitan Manila Development Authority
- Length: 2.871 km (1.784 mi)

Major junctions
- North end: AH 26 (N1) (Epifanio de los Santos Avenue) in Muñoz
- South end: N170 (Quezon Avenue) in Santa Cruz

Location
- Country: Philippines
- Major cities: Quezon City

Highway system
- Roads in the Philippines; Highways; Expressways; List

Fernando Poe Jr. Avenue (also known as FPJ Avenue), formerly Roosevelt Avenue (Tagalog: [ˈruːsbɛlt]), is the principal north–south tertiary road serving the San Francisco del Monte district (colloquially known as Frisco) of Quezon City, Philippines. It is 2.871 kilometers (1.784 mi) long and runs between Epifanio de los Santos Avenue (EDSA) to the north and Quezon Avenue to the south. The avenue is named after Fernando Poe Jr., a renowned Filipino actor and National Artist of the Philippines who once lived along it. Its former name, Roosevelt Avenue, was named after former President of the United States Franklin D. Roosevelt.

The avenue and the adjacent area are also referred to by locals as Muñoz, as it is the site of a popular wet market, the Muñoz Market, located at the corner of FPJ Avenue and EDSA. The market was named after its owner, Demetrio Muñoz, a philanthropist, businessman and presidential adviser during the administration of Diosdado Macapagal from the province of Pampanga. At the opposite end of FPJ on Quezon Avenue is Fisher Mall, a commercial establishment built on the land that used to be the main terminal of the Pangasinan Transportation Company (PANTRANCO), which went bankrupt in 1993. FPJ Avenue is also home to the former transmitter of Intercontinental Broadcasting Corporation (IBC).

== Renaming proposals ==
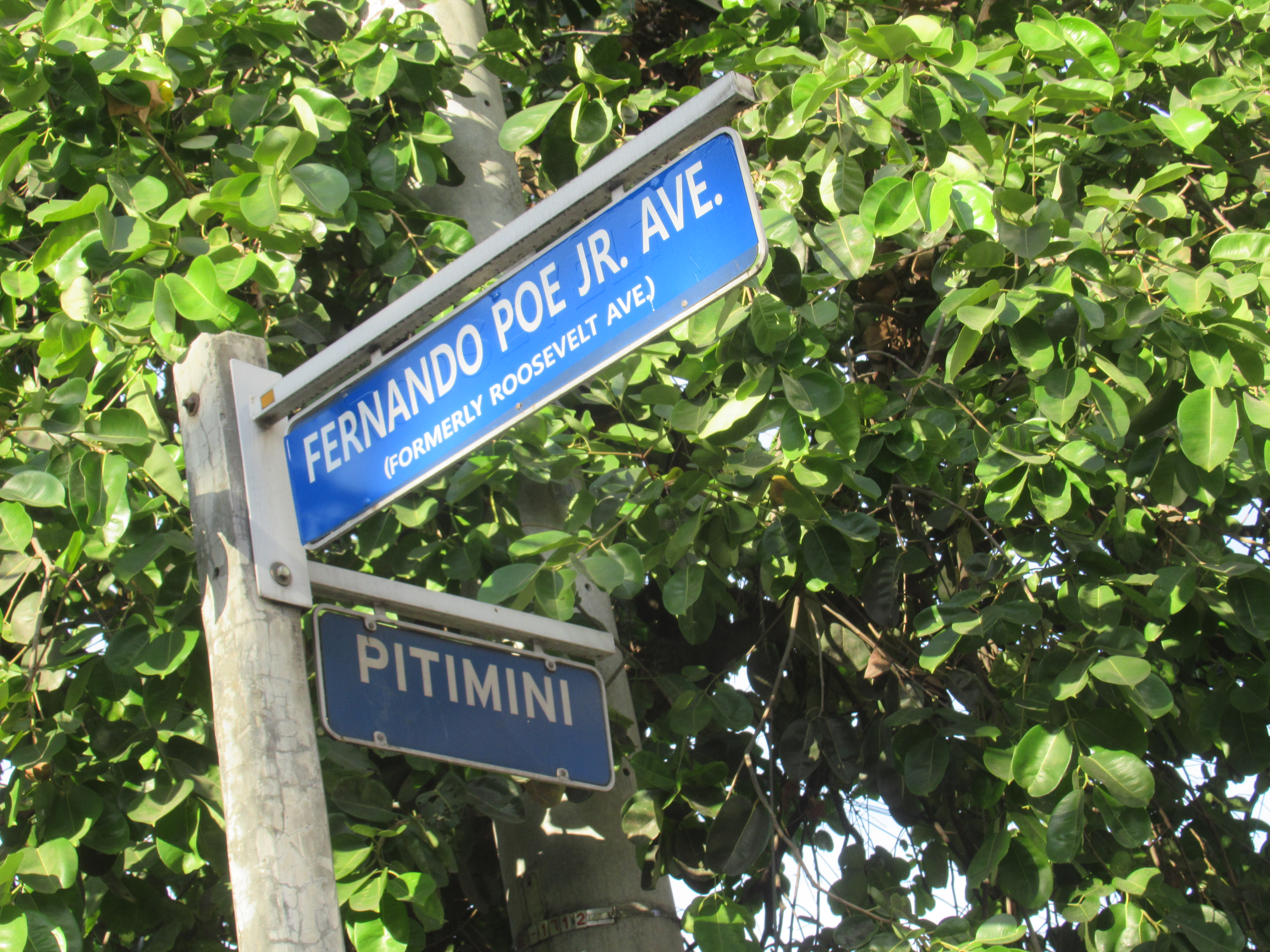
A street sign of the avenue after it was renamed to Fernando Poe Jr. Avenue

In 2010, Quezon City's 1st district representative Vincent Crisologo authored a bill in Congress to rename Roosevelt Avenue after his predecessor, former representative Reynaldo Calalay, who died in office in 2003.

Senate amended House Bill No. 7499, originally to rename the adjacent Del Monte Avenue after the actor Fernando Poe Jr. After considering opinions from various religious groups and the National Historical Commission of the Philippines, Senate President Tito Sotto introduced an amendment to rename Roosevelt Avenue instead. On September 13, 2021, the Senate approved the amendment and the bill. The House concurred with the Senate amendment on September 28 and transmitted it to President Rodrigo Duterte on November 20 for his signature. On December 10, 2021, President Duterte signed Republic Act No. 11608, renaming the road as Fernando Poe Jr. Avenue. It was published in the Official Gazette on January 13, 2022.

== Route description ==
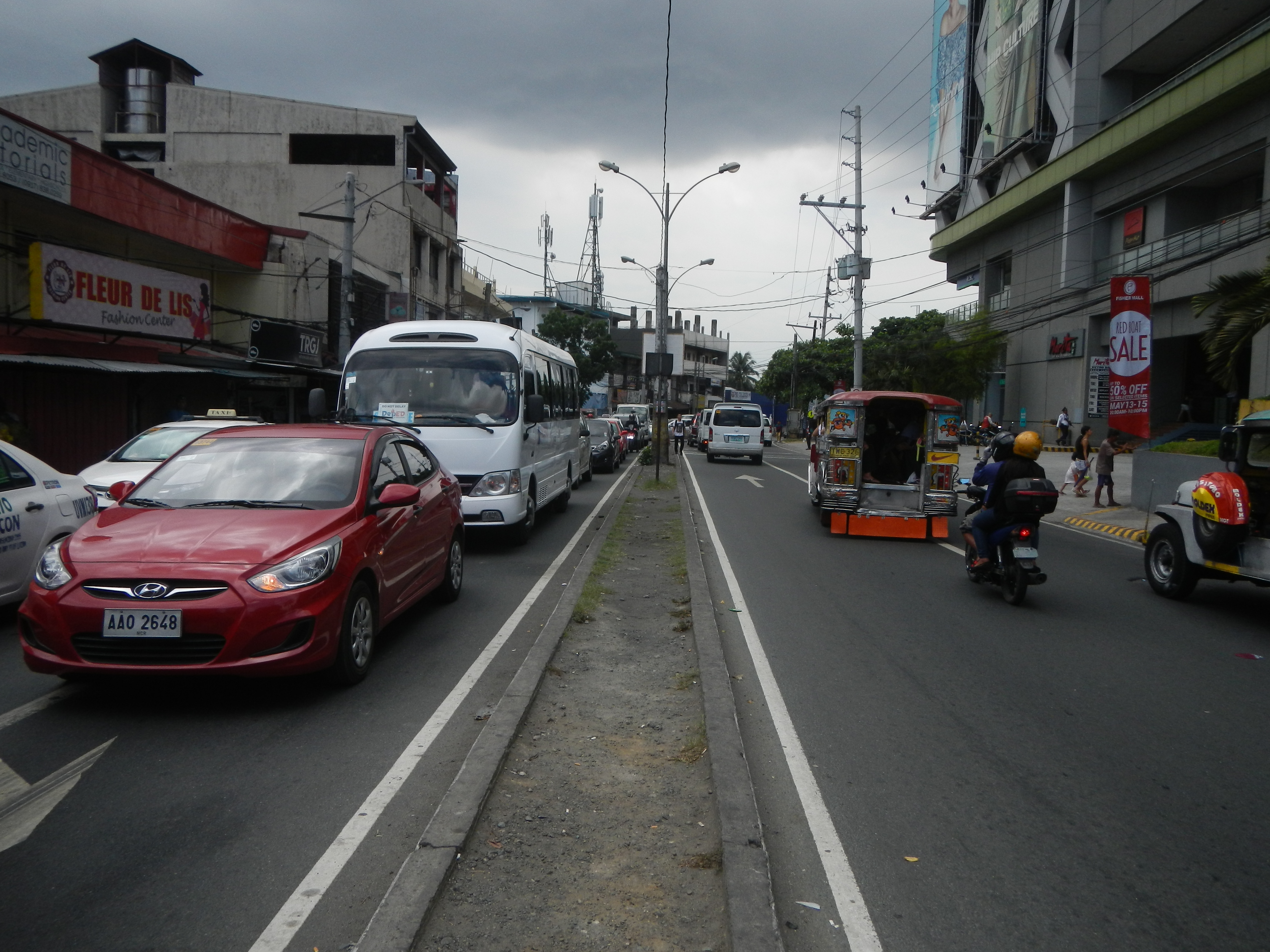
Fernando Poe Jr. Avenue northbound from its intersection with Quezon Avenue

FPJ Avenue is located in Quezon City, northeast of Manila and runs for roughly 2.9 kilometers (1.8 mi) along a north–south axis. Starting at its southern terminus at the junction with Quezon Avenue in Barangay Santa Cruz, the road heads north toward Barangay Paraiso, providing access to Damayan, the site of the old Santuario de San Pedro Bautista church of the former pueblo of San Francisco del Monte built in 1593. It intersects with Del Monte Avenue, from where it continues on a straight path north through the mixed residential and industrial villages of San Antonio and Paltok, where a Coca-Cola plant stands next to the IBC transmitter (now demolished in 2023). The road ends at the intersection with EDSA by the Muñoz Market and Walter Mart North Edsa.

North of EDSA, FPJ Avenue continues as Congressional Avenue, heading northeast to Project 8 and the Culiat area. It is served by the Fernando Poe Jr. station of LRT Line 1.
