= FPJ (disambiguation) =

FPJ is an initialism for Fernando Poe Jr. (1939–2004), a Filipino actor.

FPJ may also refer to:

- Fernando Poe Jr. Avenue (formerly Roosevelt Avenue), a road in Quezon City
- Fernando Poe Jr. station (formerly Roosevelt station), an LRT station
- The Free Press Journal, an Indian newspaper
