= San Antonio, Quezon City =

Barangay in Quezon City, Metro Manila, Philippines

San Antonio
- Barangay
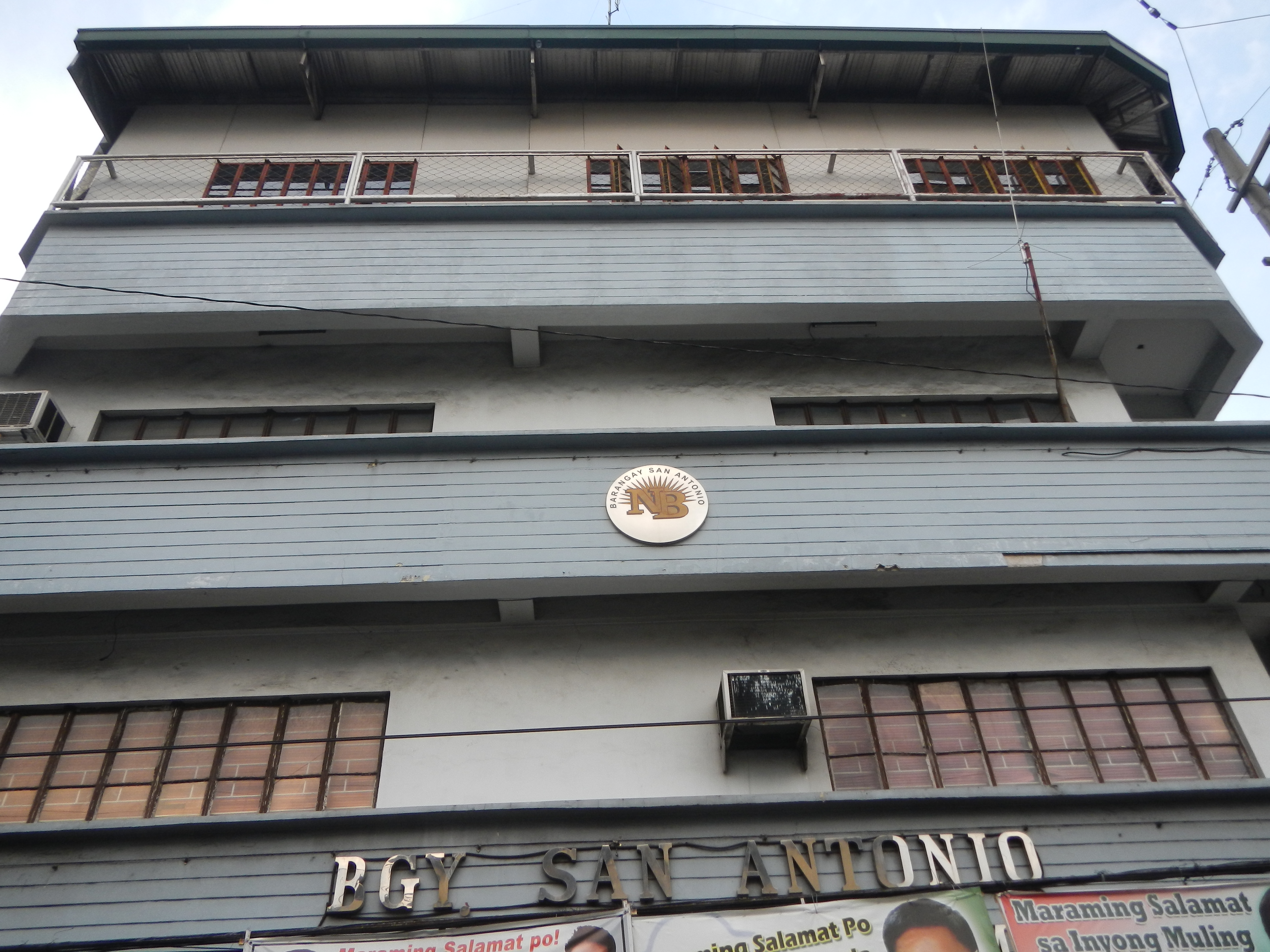
- Barangay Hall

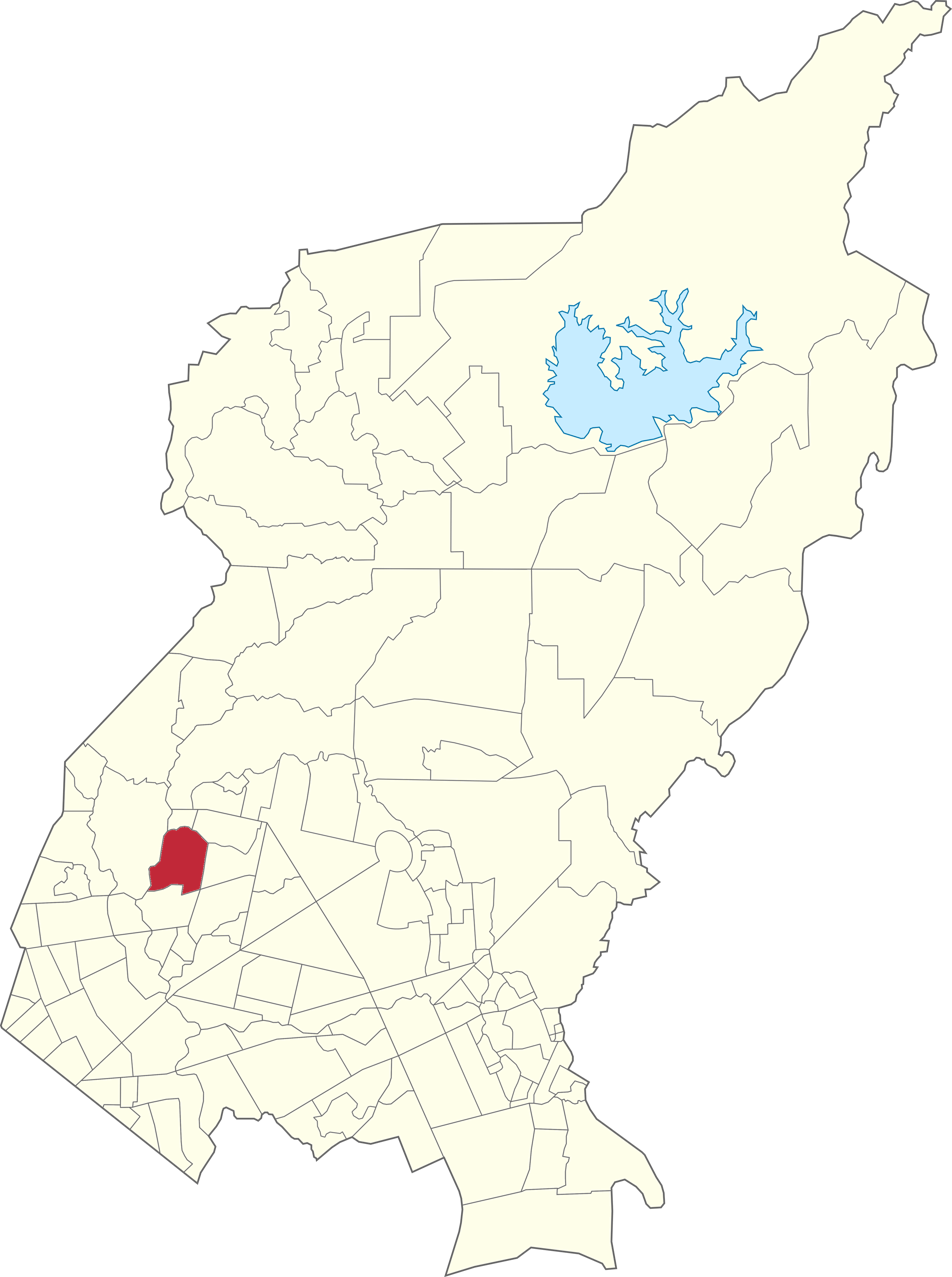
- Map of Quezon City showing San Antonio

- Location of San Antonio within Metro Manila
- Coordinates: 14°39′0″N 121°0′59″E
- Country: Philippines
- Region: National Capital Region
- City: Quezon City
- District: 1st District of Quezon City

Government
  - Type: Barangay
  - Barangay Chairman: Daniel Berroya
- Time zone: UTC+8 (PST)
- Zip Code: 1105
- Area code: 02

San Antonio is one of the 142 barangays of Quezon City, Metro Manila, Philippines.

== Area and Location ==
San Antonio is bounded by the Dario River in the East, Judge Juan Luna Street in the West, Pat Senador and Baler Streets in the south and the Halang Creek in the north. Nearby barangays are Veterans Village (Project 7), Bahay Toro, Bungad, Katipunan, Del Monte and Paltok.

== San Francisco del Monte ==
San Antonio is a part of the San Francisco del Monte area named after its benevolent Spanish friar and founder, St. Francis of Assisi. Founded by Saint Pedro Bautista on February 17, 1590, it was meant to be a place of solitude or "retreat" nestled atop a hill. The present Santuario de San Pedro Bautista was the first structure in the area.

It was an independent town during the Spanish era with an area of 250 acres (1.0 km^{2}) of land filled with wildlife and trees, later absorbed by Quezon City when it was created. Today, it is a heavily populated industrial district with factories mostly located along Judge Juan Luna Street. Two national roads are found in this area, namely Roosevelt and Del Monte Avenues.

Originally around 2.5 km^{2} (0.97 sq mi) in area. It extended beyond Projects 7 and 8 as well as Timog Avenue area. Currently, it is composed of Barangays Damayan, Mariblo, Masambong, Paltok, Paraiso and San Antonio.

== Patron saint ==
The patron saint of Barangay San Antonio is Anthony of Padua whose feast day, the entire community celebrates every 13 June.

== Demography ==
As of the 2020 census of the Philippine Statistics Authority, the population of Barangay San Antonio went down to 22,229 from 24,667 5 years prior.

== Barangay and Sangguniang Kabataan officials ==
=== List of Punong Barangay ===
Full Name	Term Began	Term Ended
Daniel Leon S. Berroya	June 30, 2018	December 31, 2022
Ernesto R. Berroya	November 30, 2013	June 30, 2018

=== Members of Sangguniang Barangay ===
Title	Name
Barangay Captain; Punong Barangay	Daniel Leon S. Berroya
SK Chairperson; Sangguniang Kabataan	Alan Jazper Angeles
Secretary; Kalihim	
Treasurer; Ingat Yaman	
Barangay councilors Kagawad	Eddie King
Barangay councilors Kagawad	Delilah Mallari
Barangay councilors Kagawad	Arlyn Guillermo
Barangay councilors Kagawad	Alex Chua
Barangay councilors Kagawad	Armando Pasco
Barangay councilors Kagawad	Bennet Melencio
Barangay councilors Kagawad	Dick Samson

The current Barangay Captain, the Barangay Kagawads and SK Council were elected in November 2023.
