= Bungad =

Barangay in Quezon City, Metro Manila, Philippines

- Barangay
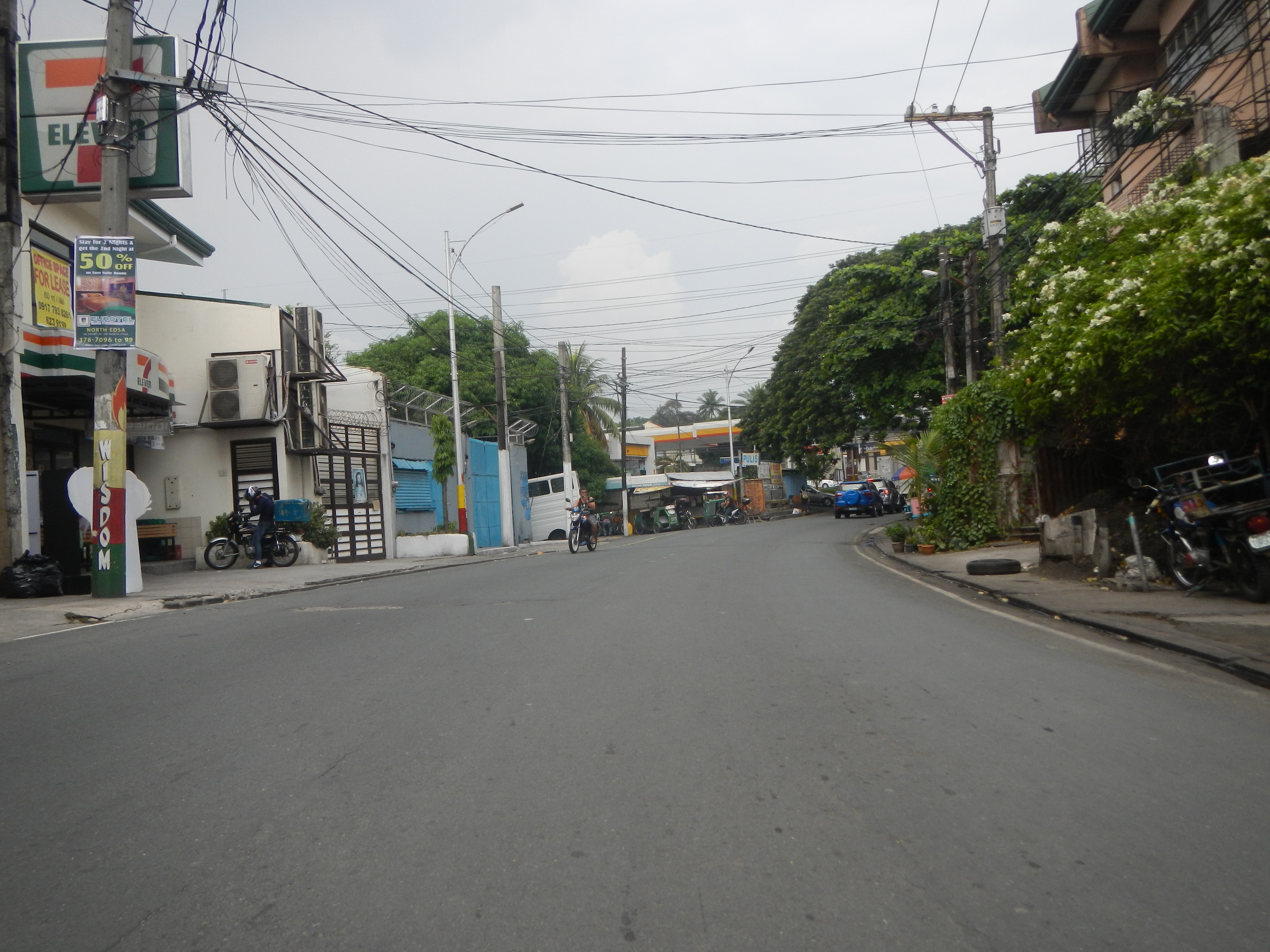
- Baler Street
- Interactive map of Bungad
- Coordinates: 14°39′2″N 121°1′29″E
- Country: Philippines
- Region: National Capital Region
- City: Quezon City
- District: 1st District of Quezon City

Government
  - Type: Barangay
  - Barangay Chairman: Sherilyn D. Corpuz

Area
  - Total: 50.58 ha (125.0 acres)

Population (2020)
  - Total: 7,014
  - Density: 13,870/km^{2} (35,920/sq mi)
- Time zone: UTC+8 (PST)
- Zip Code: 1105
- Area code: 02
- PSGC: 137404018
- Website: Facebook

Bungad is a barangay in Quezon City, Metro Manila, Philippines.

It is one of the 142 barangays of Quezon City and is bounded by Barangays Veterans Village in the north, San Antonio in the West, Paltok in the south and Philam in the east. It is part of the city district of Project 7, which includes Barangay Veterans Village.

== History ==
=== Establishment ===
The area lies at the edge of San Francisco del Monte, which gives its name from the Filipino word bungad, meaning "front". It was established as a barrio under City Ordinance No. 4762 (series of 1961) on May 29, 1961. The barrio's borders were expanded to include a strip of land owned by the People's Homesite and Housing Corporation parallel to West Avenue from Baler Street to EDSA through City Ordinance No. 4860 (series of 1961) on October 9, 1961. The barrio would be converted to a barangay through City Executive Order 20, converting all barrios into barangays.

=== Development of North EDSA corridor ===
After the completion of SM City North EDSA as the country's first SM Supermall, the West Avenue area has developed into a business and commercial hub of office and hotel buildings, automobile accessories and automotive repair shops and transport hub for commuters going to and from downtown Manila and northern Quezon City areas.

Notable landmarks include SM Cyber West at North EDSA, West Insula Condominium, Westlife Building, and Cablelink Holdings (Quezon City office).

Other business offices in the area are Gerry's Grill Headquarters, SBS Philippines Corporation (formerly Sytangco Philippines Corporation), PLDT STQ (formerly EDSA Quezon City Office), Uratex Corporation, Pacific Corporate Center, The West Wing Building, Hua Yan Buddhist Learning Society, Amron System and Khong Guan Biscuits Incorporated.

A number of public and private schools have also been established in the vicinity such as St. Vincent School, Kolisko Waldorf School, Montessori West School, government-run Bungad Elementary School and Judge Juan Luna High School.

== Barangay and Sangguniang Kabataan officials ==
=== Punong Barangay ===
Full Name	Term Began	Term Ended
Sherilyn D. Corpuz	June 30, 2018	June 30, 2020
Ricardo B. Corpuz	November 30, 2013	June 30, 2018

=== Members of Sangguniang Barangay ===
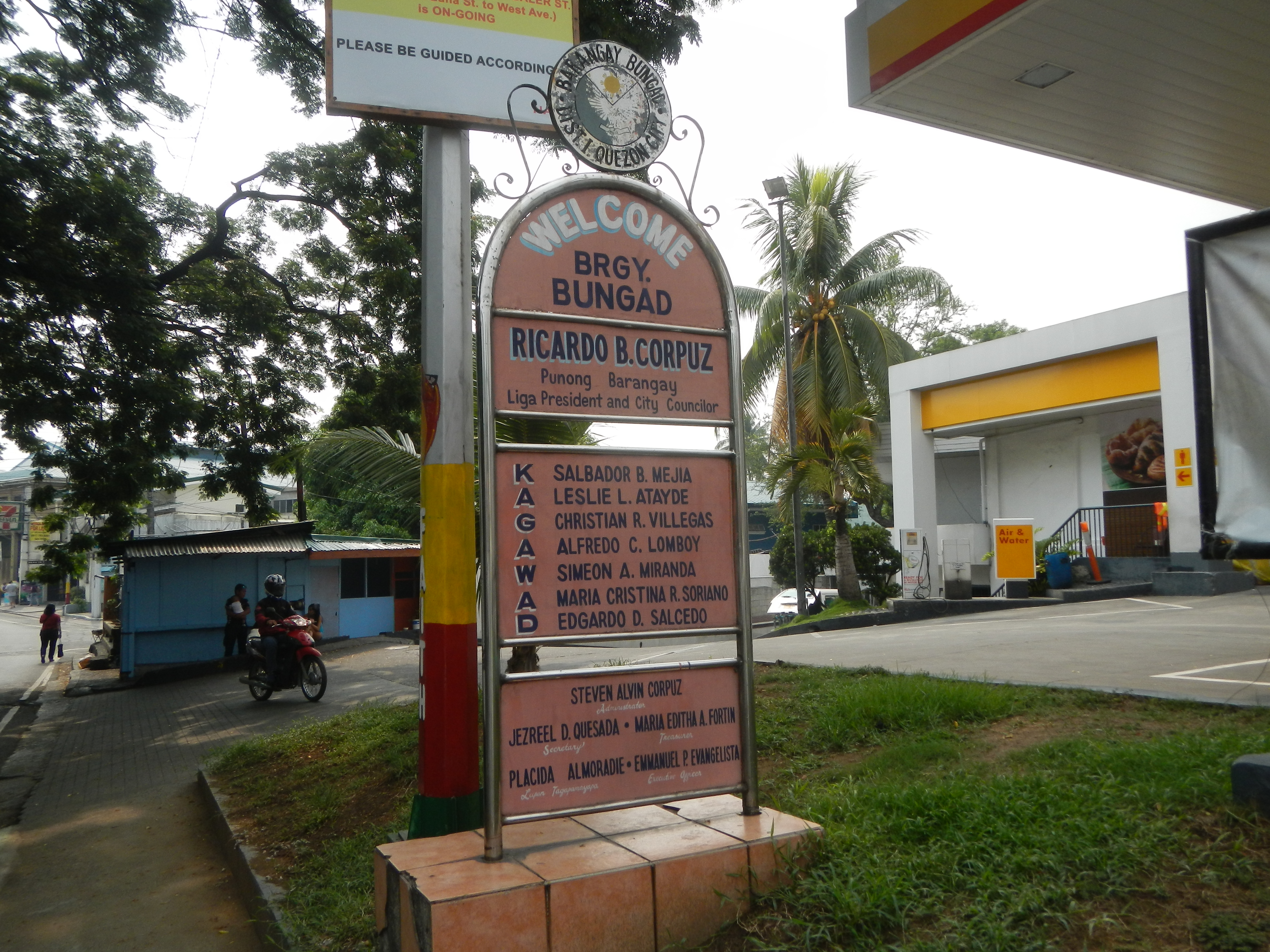
A welcome sign of Barangay Bungad showing its punong barangay officials.

Title	Name
Barangay Captain; Punong Barangay	Sherilyn D. Corpuz
SK Chairperson; Sangguniang Kabataan	Renazel A. Vergara
Secretary; Kalihim	Josephine S. Lim
Treasurer; Ingat Yaman	Carmen Calma
Barangay councilors Kagawad	Salvador Mejia
Barangay councilors Kagawad	Ruffy Collera
Barangay councilors Kagawad	Cesar S. Cruz
Barangay councilors Kagawad	Ester Atayde
Barangay councilors Kagawad	Maria Cristina Soriano
Barangay councilors Kagawad	Francis Rome Alano
Barangay councilors Kagawad	Leah Alamani

The new Barangay and SK Councils were elected.

== Demographics ==
Barangay Bungad is the 74th most-populated barangay in Quezon City, with a population of 7,014 people according to the 2020 census, down from a population of 8,057 people in the 2015 census.

== Government ==
The seat of government of Bungad is at its barangay hall located at the end of Sanchez Street.

== Places of Worship ==
- The Roman Catholic parish church of Santo Cristo de Bungad, located along M.H. Del Pilar Street
- Capitol City Baptist Church, located at the corner of West Avenue and Bulacan Street.

== See also ==
- Barangays of Quezon City
- Legislative districts of Quezon City
- Vincent Crisologo
- Quezon City
- Manila Light Rail Transit System Line 1
- Manila Metro Rail Transit System Line 3
- Manila Metro Rail Transit System Line 7
- Barangay elections
