= San Francisco del Monte =

District of Quezon City, Philippines

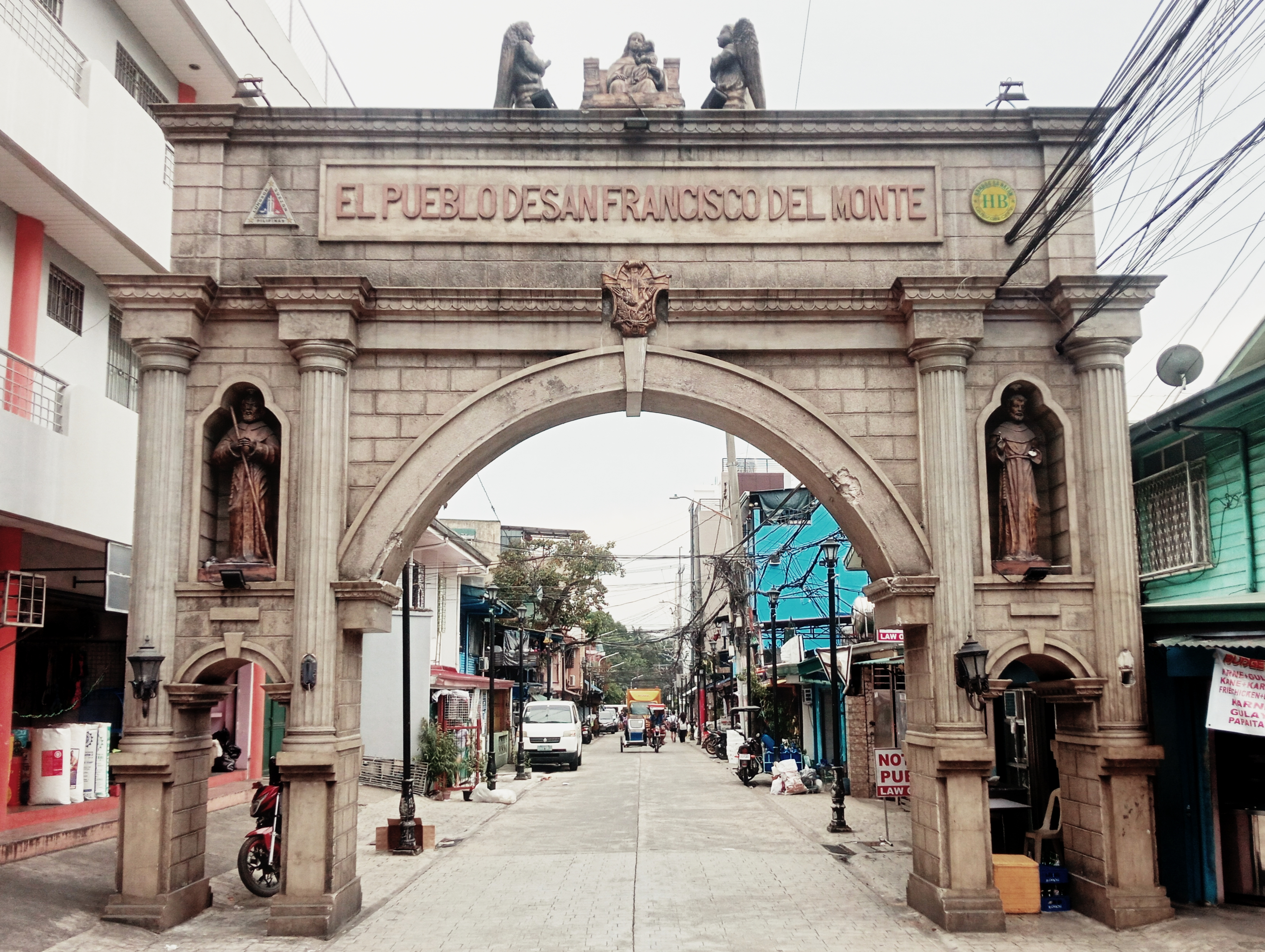
San Francisco del Monte Arch

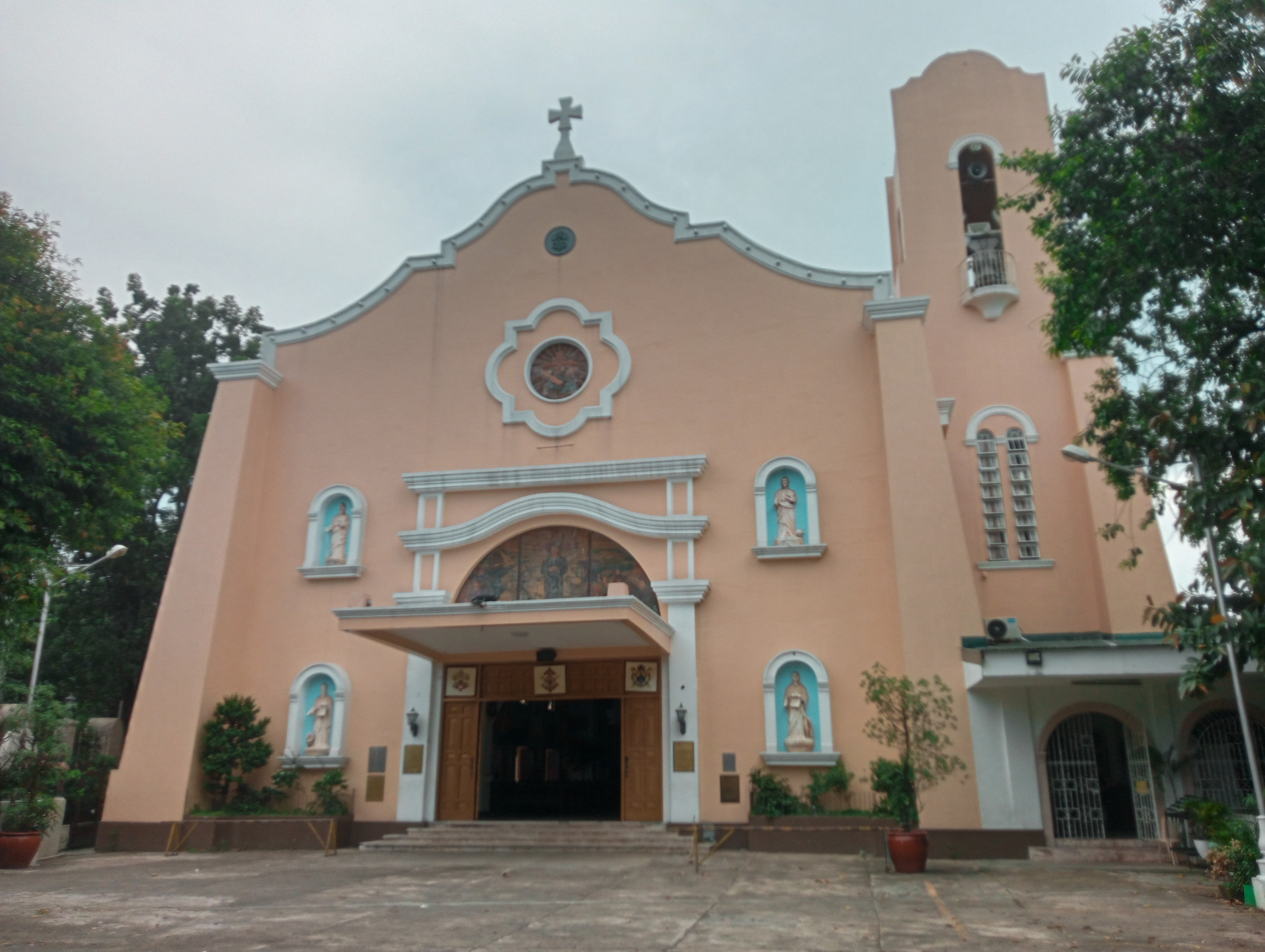
Minor Basilica of San Pedro Bautista

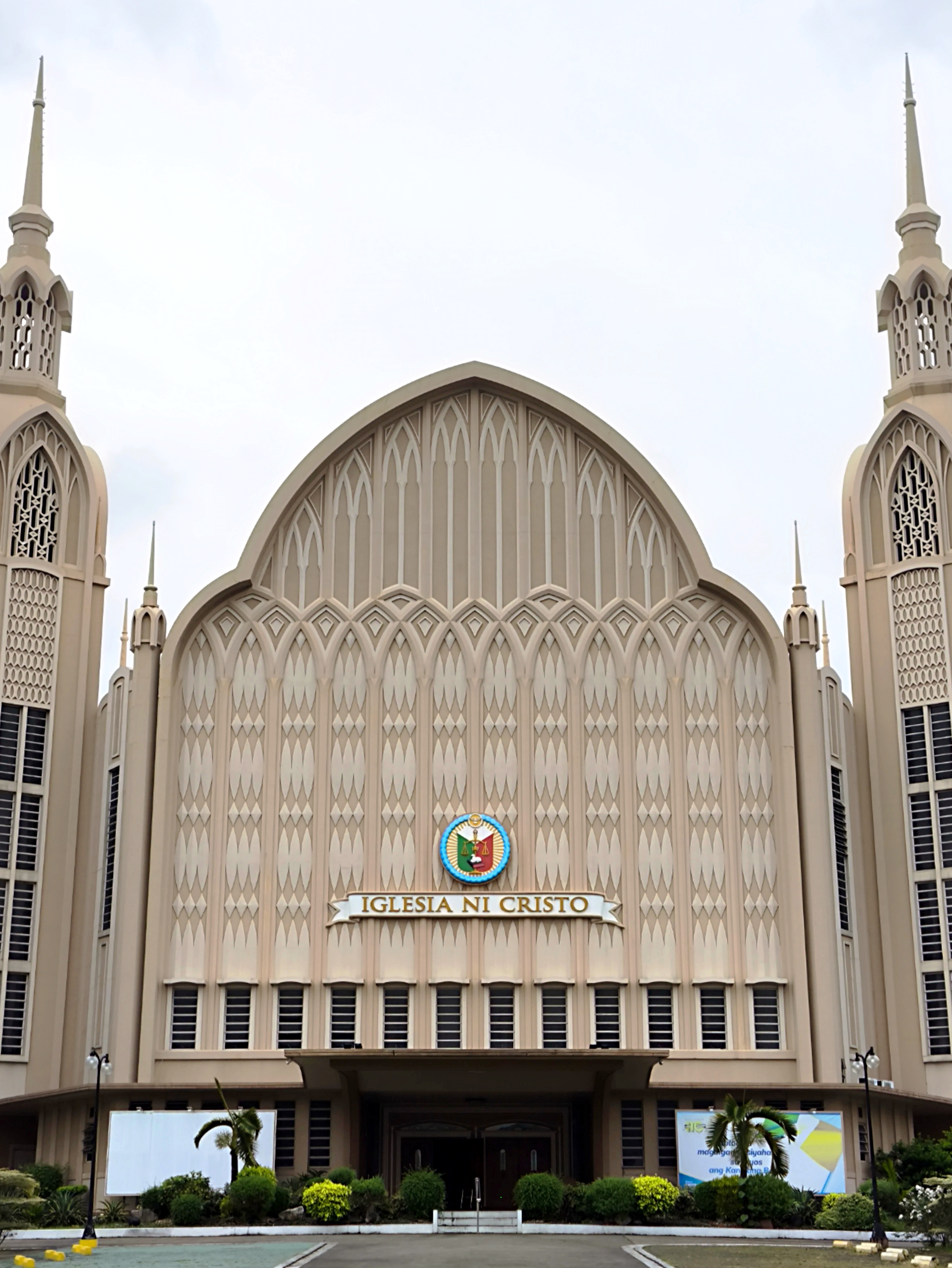
Iglesia Ni Cristo (INC) Lokal ng San Francisco del Monte, also known locally as the Lokal ng Frisco.

San Francisco del Monte, also referred to as SFDM and Frisco, is a district of Quezon City, Philippines. It is bisected by two major thoroughfares, Fernando Poe Jr. Avenue and the eponymous Del Monte Avenue, and is bounded by Atty. Pat Senador Sr. Street and Baler Street to the north, and Judge Juan Luna Street, Paraiso Street, and Cooper Street to the east.

The district encompasses the barangays of Del Monte, Damayan, Mariblo, and Paraiso, and its water borders are defined by the San Juan River to the west and the Mariblo Creek to the south.

== History ==
San Francisco del Monte may be considered as Quezon City's oldest district. The site was offered by Governor-General Santiago de Vera to Franciscan missionary Fray Pedro Bautista on February 17, 1590. It would be named it after St. Francis of Assisi, founder of the Franciscan Order. Del Monte, which is Spanish for "on the mountain" was added to the name not only because the area was hilly, but also to distinguish the place from the San Francisco de Manila Church in Intramuros, Manila.

The 250 hectare hacienda was part of San Juan del Monte prior to its inclusion in Quezon City in 1939.

After World War II, the portions of the district hosted the United States Armed Forces Cemetery #2, where remains of deceased American POWs from the early part of the war were interred.

The original land area of the old town of San Francisco del Monte was approximately 2.5 square kilometers (0.97 sq mi) and covered parts of what is currently known as Project 7 and 8 and Timog Avenue. It later composed of barangays San Antonio, Paraiso, Paltok, Mariblo, Masambong, Manresa, Damayan and Del Monte. It featured a hilly topography with lush vegetation and mineral springs, in the midst of which the old San Pedro Bautista Church was built as a retreat and monastery for Franciscan friars.

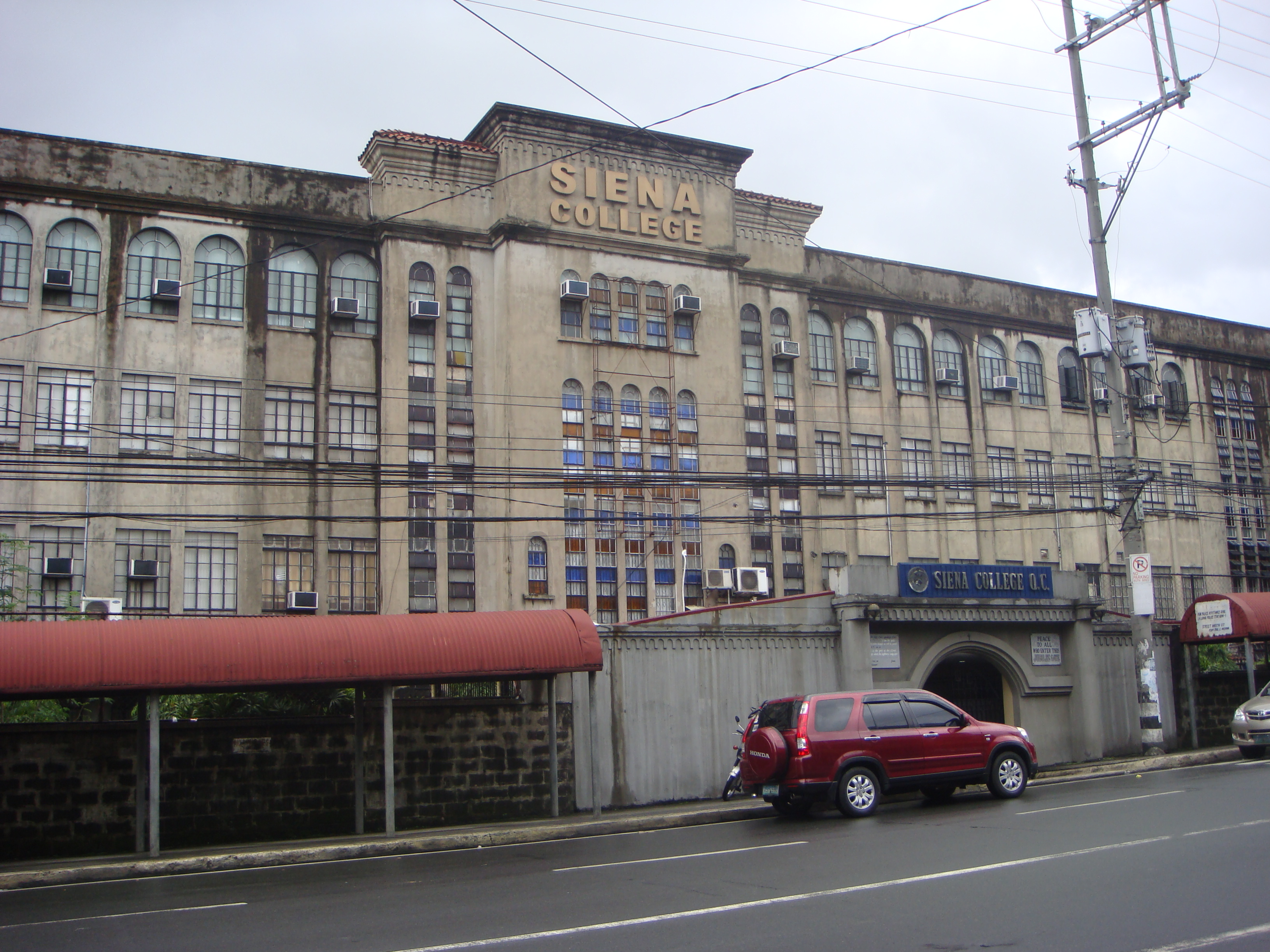
Siena College of Quezon City

Today, it is a heavily populated district with a mix of residential, industrial, and commercial areas. The most prominent educational institutions located in the area are Siena College of Quezon City, Angelicum College, and PMI Colleges, while Fisher Mall is the largest commercial establishment. The transmitter and studios of IBC are located along Fernando Poe Jr. Avenue.

Famous residents include the late Filipino actor Fernando Poe Jr. whose ancestral home can still be found in Barangay Paraiso along Roosevelt Avenue; the aforementioned avenue would be later renamed after him in 2022.
