= Fisher Mall =

- Aerial view of Fisher Mall (2026)
- Location: Quezon Avenue corner Fernando Poe Jr. Avenue, Quezon City, Philippines
- Coordinates: 14°38′01.2″N 121°01′09.3″E
- Opened: December 10, 2013; 12 years ago (supermarket); January 29, 2014; 12 years ago (grand opening)
- Developer: Mallers Investment, Inc.
- Owner: Mallers Management Corporation
- Architect: Palafox & Associates (mall structure); Jonathan O. Gan + Associates (interior design)
- Num. of stores: ~150
- Floor area: 114,000 square meters (1,230,000 sq ft)
- Floors: 5 levels + 3 levels for basement parking
- Parking: 1000 slots (basement carpark)
- Public transit: 6 Fisher Mall
- Website: fishermall.com.ph

The Fisher Mall is a minor mall chain that first opened in Quezon City on January 29, 2014. The location of the mall was formerly occupied by the Pantranco bus terminal. A branch of the mall is located in Malabon City. One of the mall's anchors, Fisher Supermarket, primarily sells fish supplied by Irma Fishing Inc.

== Etymology ==
The Fisher Mall's name is a homage to the Mallers Management Corporation President Ray del Rosario's ancestors who initiated Irma Fishing Inc., based in Malabon.

== Branches ==
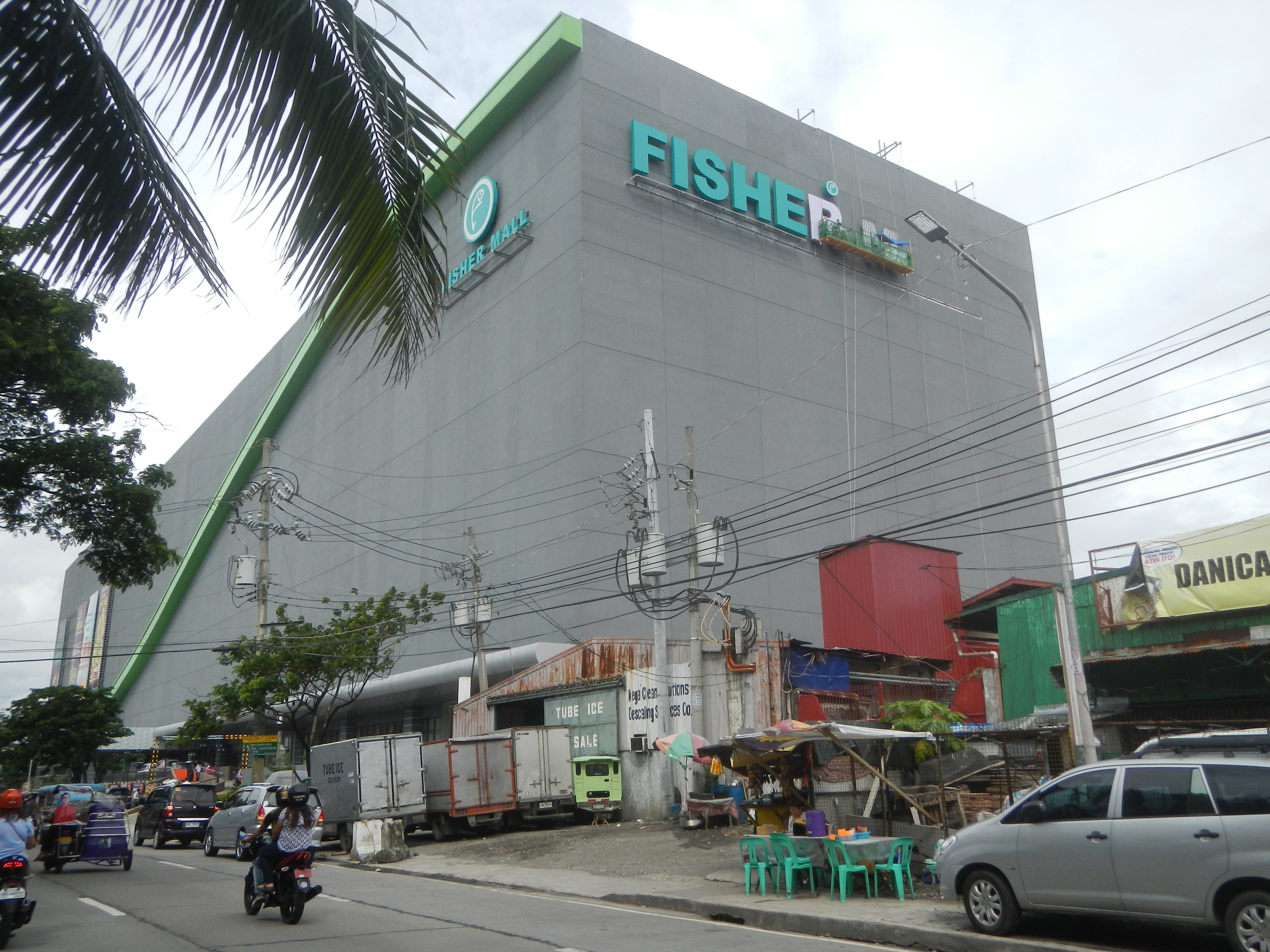
Fisher Mall Malabon

The first ever branch of the mall is in Quezon City, along Quezon Avenue. Since the opening of their branch in Malabon, it has been retroactively renamed as Fisher Mall Quezon Avenue.

Fisher Mall Malabon is the second branch located at the Del Rosarios' home town of Malabon at C-4 Road cor. Dagat-Dagatan Ave. The new mall soft-opened on November 29, 2018, and had its grand opening on January 31, 2019.

Apart from their anchor Department Store and Supermarket, it includes the updated The Galley foodcourt.
