= Basilica Minore de San Pedro Bautista =

Roman Catholic minor basilica in Quezon City, Philippines

Basílica Menor y Santuario de San Pedro Bautista
- Minor Basilica and Shrine of Saint Pedro Bautista
- San Francisco del Monte Church
- Basílika Menor at Dambana ni San Pedro Bautista
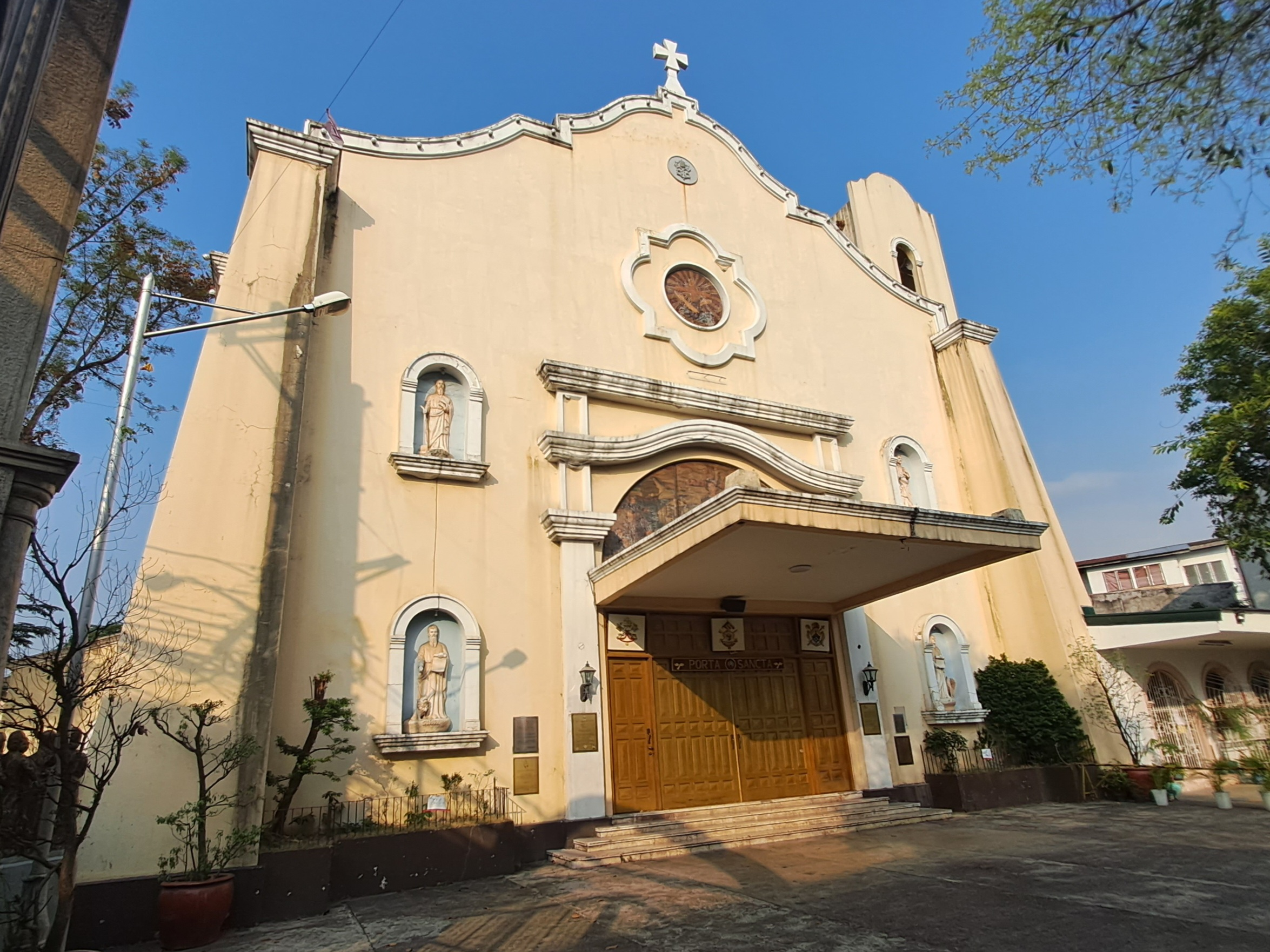
- The basilica’s façade in April 2023
- Basílica Menor y Santuario de San Pedro Bautista
- 14°38′16″N 121°0′45″E
- Location: San Francisco del Monte, Quezon City
- Country: Philippines
- Denomination: Roman Catholic
- Religious institute: Order of Friars Minor

History
- Former name: Santuario de San Pedro Bautista
- Status: Minor Basilica
- Founded: February 17, 1590; 436 years ago (sub-parish); November 11, 1932; 93 years ago (parish)
- Founder: Pedro Bautista
- Dedication: Pedro Bautista
- Consecrated: 1699; 327 years ago (original); January 30, 1971; 55 years ago (expansion)

Architecture
- Functional status: Active
- Heritage designation: Important Cultural Property
- Designated: September 28, 2017
- Architect(s): Francisco de Mondéjar; Arturo Mañalac
- Architectural type: Church
- Style: Baroque and California Mission
- Years built: 1591; 1593–1599 (dst. 1639, 1645); 1696–1699; 1969–1971
- Groundbreaking: 1696; 330 years ago (original); April 1969; 57 years ago (expansion)
- Completed: 1699; 327 years ago (original); January 30, 1971; 55 years ago (expansion)

Specifications
- Length: 50 meters (160 ft)
- Width: 20 meters (66 ft)
- Materials: Stone and reinforced concrete

Administration
- Province: Manila
- Diocese: Cubao
- Deanery: San Pedro Bautista
- Parish: San Pedro Bautista

Clergy
- Rector: Fr. Fernando B. Radin Jr, OFM

The Basílica Menor de San Pedro Bautista (Minor Basilica of Saint Pedro Bautista), also known as the San Francisco del Monte Church and alternatively as Santuario de San Pedro Bautista, is a minor basilica and parish church in the San Francisco del Monte district of Quezon City, Philippines. It is one of the oldest churches in the country and the oldest in the city, having been built in 1590. The church is dedicated to its founder, Pedro Bautista, a Spanish missionary from Ávila, Spain, who was one of 26 Christians martyred in Japan in 1597 and venerated as saints by the Church.

The shrine is in the Diocese of Cubao under the Vicariate of Saint Pedro Bautista. It is also under the administration of the Franciscans or the Order of Friars Minor (OFM), from the Franciscan Province of Saint Pedro Bautista.

The parish covers six barangays: Damayan, Del Monte, Mariblo, Paraiso, Santa Cruz, and Talayan. It is bounded by Pat Senador Street to the west, Quezon Avenue to the east, Araneta Avenue to the south, and Judge Juan Luna Street to the north.

== History ==
When Pedro Bautista was elected custos, an official of the Franciscans, he saw the need for a secluded place where the missionaries could recharge physically, mentally and spiritually. He found a hilly area he deemed suitable, and on February 17, 1590, then Governor-General Santiago de Vera granted the land to the Franciscan Order.

The town of San Francisco del Monte was an elevated area of 250 hectares (620 acres) with thick woods, surrounded by a creek and eight springs. On the site, Bautista built a little convent and a chapel made of bamboo and thatched nipa palm. He dedicated the chapel to Our Lady of Montecelli and the place was opened as a retreat house for missionaries, a novitiate, and as a relaxation place for colonial officials.

The chapel was replaced by a wooden structure in 1591, and in 1593 was fortified by clay and natural just as the convent was also constructed. The chapel was rebuilt with adobe in 1599 as designed by the architect Domingo Ortigas. The reconstruction was funded by Don Pedro Salazar, whereas the expansion of the convent was made possible by donations from Captain Domingo Ortíz de Chagoya.

The chapel was destroyed during the Limahong-led uprising in 1639, when the Chinese rebels used the church as headquarters. The 1645 earthquake completely destroyed the church and the convent, and both structures lay abandoned for 39 years.

=== Construction of the present church ===
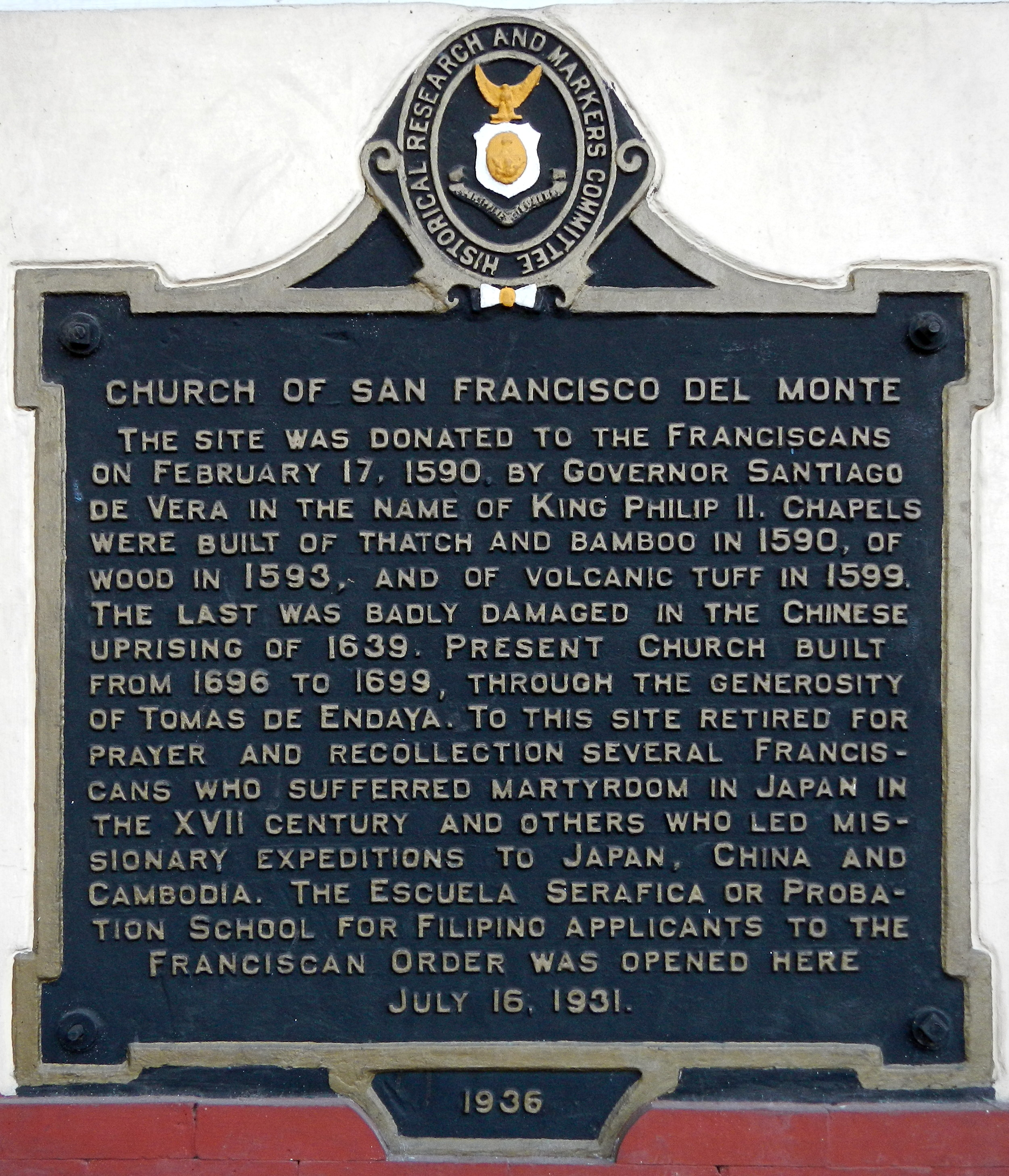
The historical marker of the shrine placed by the Philippine Historical Research and Markers Committee (now the NHCP) in 1936

Reconstruction efforts were done but halted in 1688 because the place was declared unfit for use. Construction resumed in 1696 under the supervision of Fr. Francisco de Mondéjar and through the generosity of the pious Don Tomás de Endaya, and the stone church was completed in 1699. The convent was also reconstructed alongside the church. It was also during this time when the Baroque altar was installed. The new stone church was dedicated to then newly beatified Pedro Bautista and his companion martyrs who were beatified by Pope Urban VIII on September 14, 1627, and later canonised on June 8, 1862, by Pope Pius IX.

Repairs were made in 1874 by a lay brother named Gabino Pérez.

In 1895, the friars abandoned the place, and the following year at the time of the Cry of Balintawak, Filipino revolutionary forces occupied the church. In 1898, during the Philippine–American War, American troops occupied the church. Then, it was left idle until it was repaired in 1912. In 1914, the church was blessed and a town fiesta was held to honor Saint Pedro Bautista.

=== Independent parish and expansion ===
On November 11, 1932, the church was declared its own separate parish named in honor of its founder and patron saint, Pedro Bautista. Before the decree, the parish church belonged to a parish in Caloocan (then a town northwest of San Francisco del Monte). A historical marker was placed at the facade of the old church by the Philippine Historical Research and Markers Committee (now the National Historical Commission of the Philippines) in 1936 for its historical significance.

Plans to expand the church were approved in 1969. Construction started in April 1969 with Arturo Mañalac as the architect. The original stone church was expanded by removing the northeastern wall and the new nave was constructed northeastward from the wall. With the renovation, the original church structure became the sanctuary space while the original facade and apse now appears like semitransepts of the present church. They are separated from the present sanctuary by a reinforced concrete wall with a tall archway separated from the sanctuary by wooden partitions. The former Baroque altars became side altars and sacristy of the church. There was a huge crucifix at the center of the sanctuary and the floor was changed to marble. The expanded church was dedicated on January 30, 1971.

In 1989, the three-century old Baroque altars were transferred to the main sanctuary in time for the celebration of the 400th anniversary of the founding of San Francisco del Monte on February 17, 1990. Because of this, the huge crucifix adorning the altar was removed. This would be later installed at the choir loft during the church's renovation in 2019.

On February 5, 1997, the parish marked the 400th Anniversary of the martyrdom of Saint Pedro Bautista. On February 25, 2001, the parish church was declared an archdiocesan shrine and the name was changed to Santuario de San Pedro Bautista in view of its historical and religious significance to the Archdiocese of Manila. In 2003, the church became part of the newly erected Diocese of Cubao.

=== Elevation to a minor basilica ===
The Diocese of Cubao announced on July 9, 2020, that the Holy See, on June 13 of that year, had bestowed the title of minor basilica upon the parish. It is the seventeenth minor basilica in the Philippines and the second in the diocese after the National Shrine of Our Lady of Mount Carmel. The church was solemnly declared a minor basilica on September 14.

== Architectural features ==
The church was built in the California Mission architecture. In the facade are four niches with statues of the Four Evangelists - Saint Mark, Saint Luke, Saint Matthew and Saint John. Inside the sanctuary are the three Baroque altarpieces with statues of Christian saints. A life-size image of Saint Pedro Bautista that was added during the 400th anniversary of San Francisco del Monte, is enshrined at the center niche in the middle altarpiece. Above him is a Madonna and Child statue of Our Lady of Monticelli. The left Baroque altarpiece is occupied with St. Clare of Assisi with Saint Dominic, the founder of the Dominican order, above her. In the right reredos is Saint Anthony of Padua with Saint Francis of Assisi occupying the top niche.

The church is oriented in a northeast–southwest direction, featuring a rectangular plan with a width of 20 meters (66 ft) and a length of 50 meters (160 ft).

== Organization ==
=== Vicariate of San Pedro Bautista ===
The church is under the jurisdiction of the Diocese of Cubao under the vicariate forane of San Pedro Bautista. Aside from the basilica, the vicariate covers the following churches in Quezon City:

- Immaculate Conception Parish, Damar Village
- Most Holy Redeemer Parish, San Francisco del Monte
- National Shrine of Our Lady of Lourdes
- St. Joseph the Worker Parish, Cloverleaf, Balintawak
- Sta. Perpetua Parish, Barangay San Jose
- Sta. Teresita del Niño Jesus Parish, Barangay Santa Teresita

=== Clergy ===
==== Pastoral team ====
- Rev. Fr. Fernando B. Radin Jr., OFM (Parish Priest and Rector)
- Rev. Fr. Edwin Peter R. Dionisio, OFM (Friary Guardian)
- Rev. Fr. Mark Gil D. Yongco, OFM (Parochial Vicar/House Vicar, Parochial Bursar, Master of Postulants)
- Rev. Fr. Christian Exequiel T. Bueno, OFM (Resident Friar and Vocation Director)

==== Parish priests ====
- Fr. Mariano Montero, OFM (1932–1933)
- Fr. Jose Agundez, OFM (1933–1935)
- Fr. Francisco Santos, OFM (1935–1938)
- Fr. Blas Garcia, OFM (1938–1939),
- Fr. Alejandro Carrasco, OFM (1939–1943)
- Fr. Angel Portalatin, OFM (1943–1945)
- Fr. Gerardo Chicano, OFM (1945–1954)
- Fr. Roberto Mangubat, OFM (1954–1960)
- Fr. Silvestre Murillo, OFM (1960–1964)
- Fr. Segundino Blanco, OFM (1964–1966)
- Fr. Jesus Martinez, OFM (1966–1967)
- Fr. Agapito Diez, OFM (1967)
- Fr. Jose Barullo, OFM (1967–1968)
- Fr. Leon Ramos, OFM (1968–1969)
- Fr. Agapito Diez, OFM (1969–1983)
- Fr. Alberto Baldo, OFM (1983–1989)
- Fr. Jimmy Giron, OFM (1989–1995)
- Fr. Romeo Gil Abesamis, OFM (April 1995-November 1995)
- Fr. Cielo Almazan, OFM (1995-April 1996)
- Fr. Roberto Manansala, OFM (1996–2002)
- Fr. Reu Jose Galoy, OFM (April 2002 – 2006)
- Fr. Carlos Santos, OFM (2006-December 2009)
- Fr. Romeo Floralde, OFM (December 2009-April 2010)
- Fr. Alberto Marfil, OFM (2010–2013)
- Fr. Edwin Peter Dionisio, OFM (2013–2019)
- Fr. Irineo R. Tactac, OFM (2019–2022)
- Fr. Bernardo M. Lanuza, OFM (2022–2025)
- Fr. Fernando B. Radin Jr, OFM (2025–present)

== Gallery ==
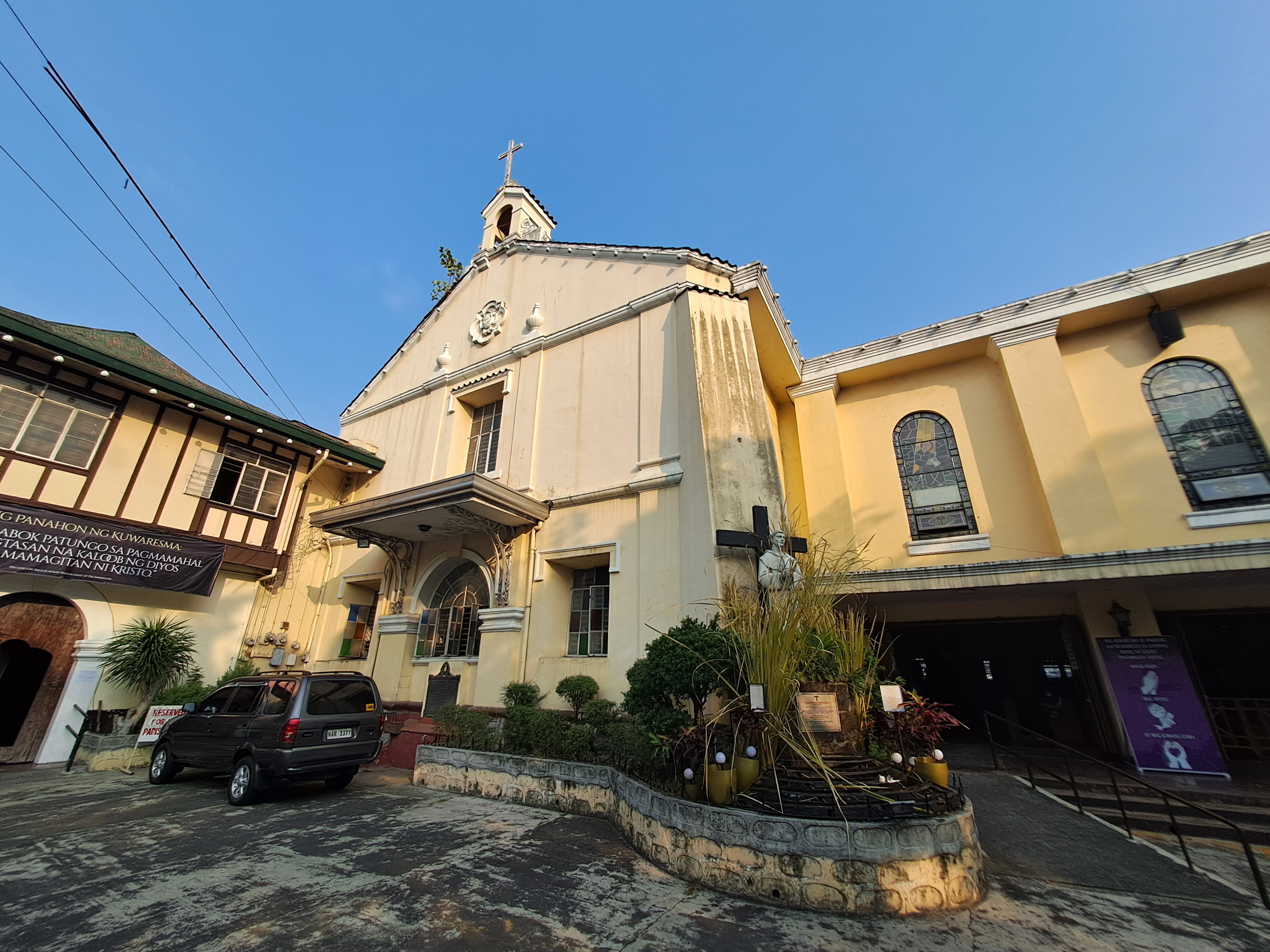
The original façade of the San Pedro Bautista Shrine built in 1699

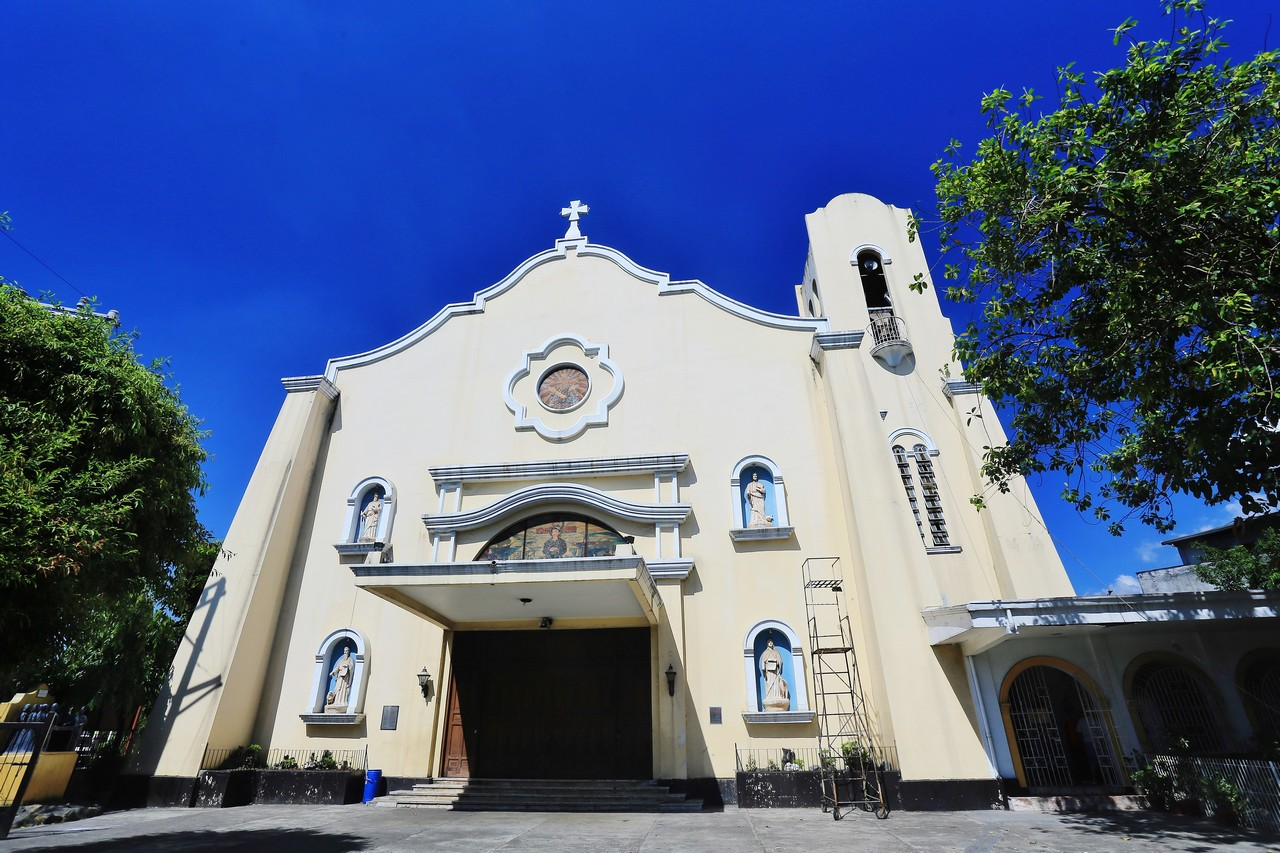
The present façade of the church added in the 1970s

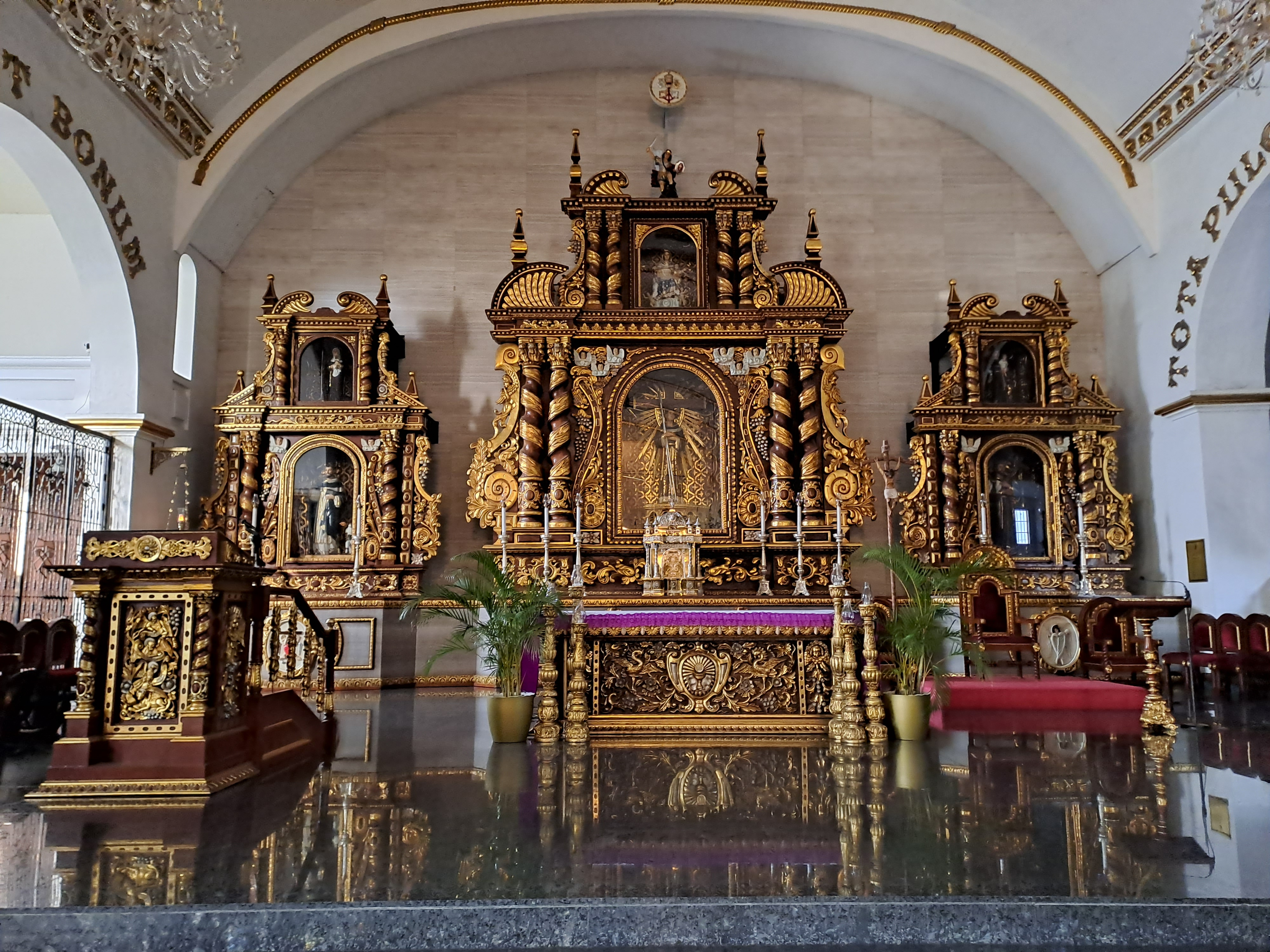
Altar and reredos

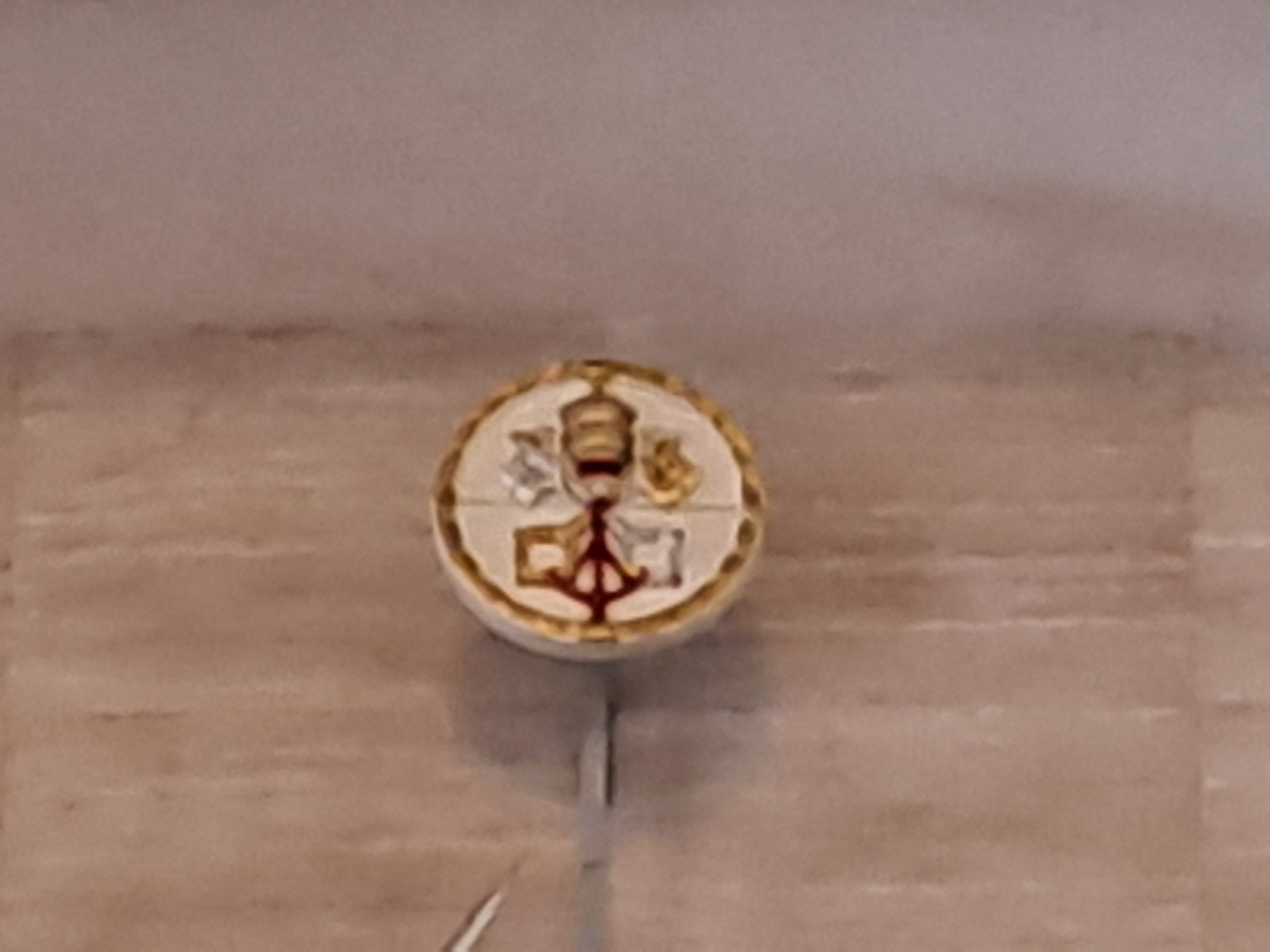
The papal arms placed on top of the altar signifying its status as a minor basilica

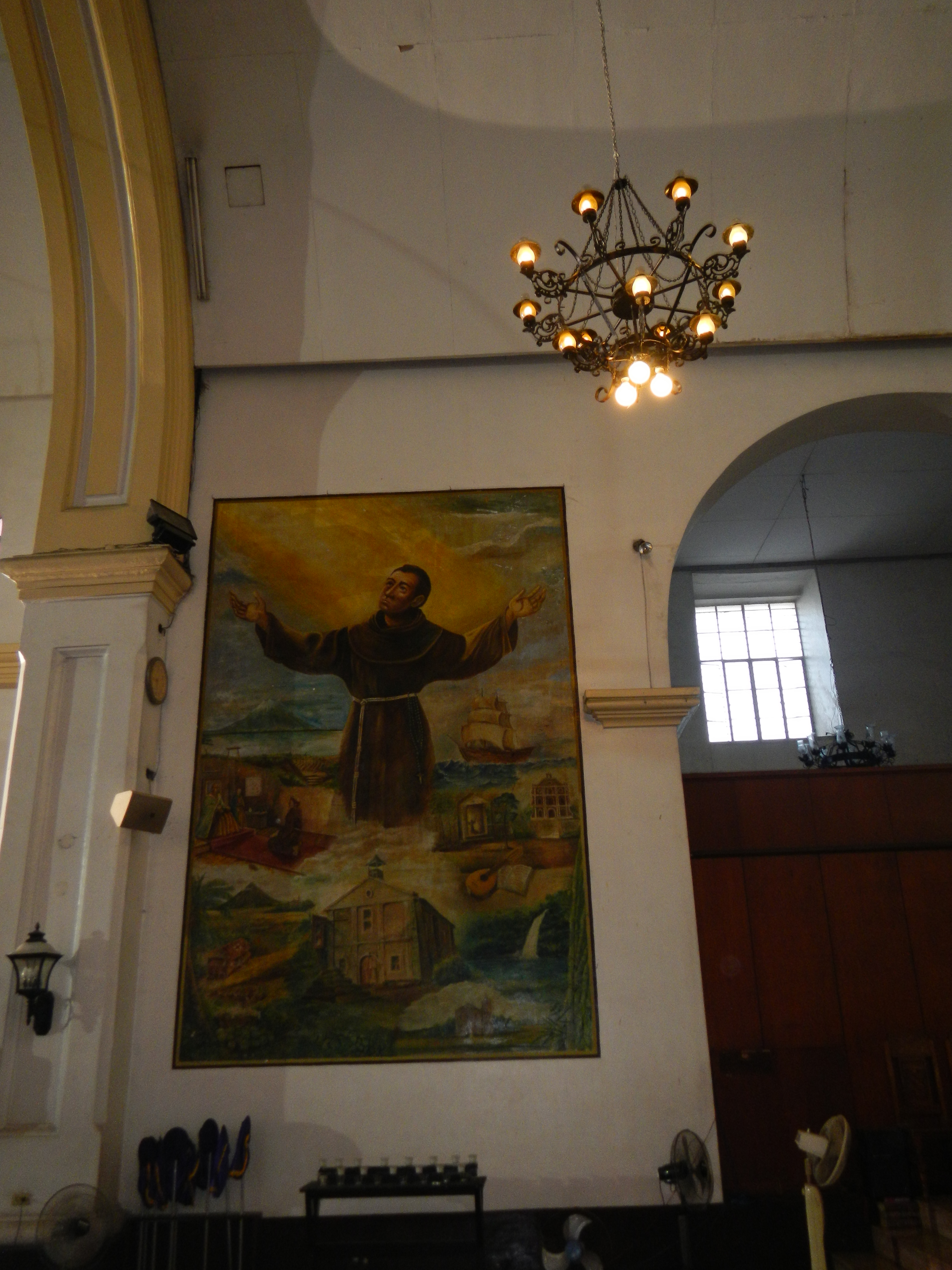
Mural of St. Pedro Bautista and the original church below him, the window of the original façade to the right of the mural

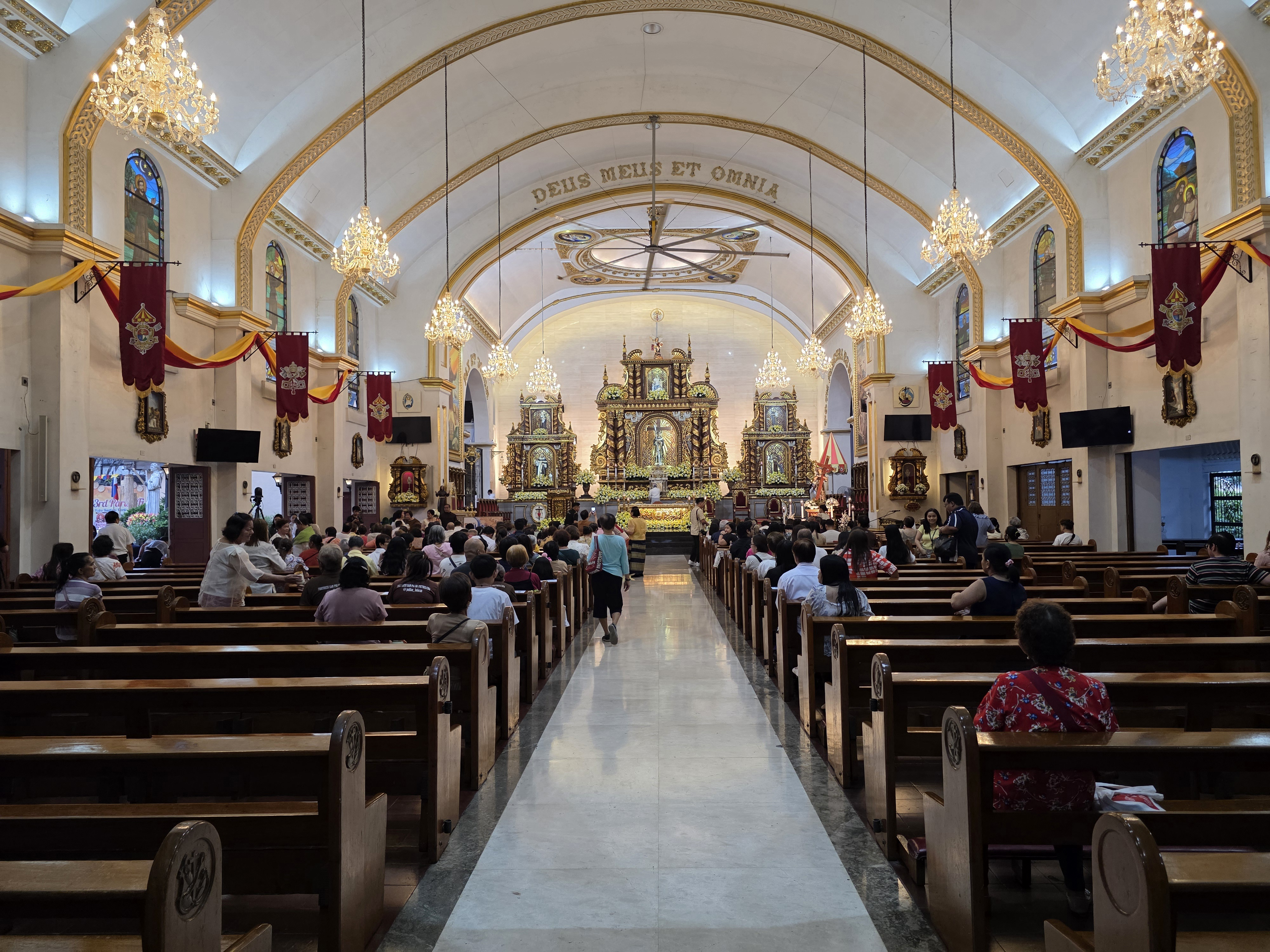
Church interior in 2026

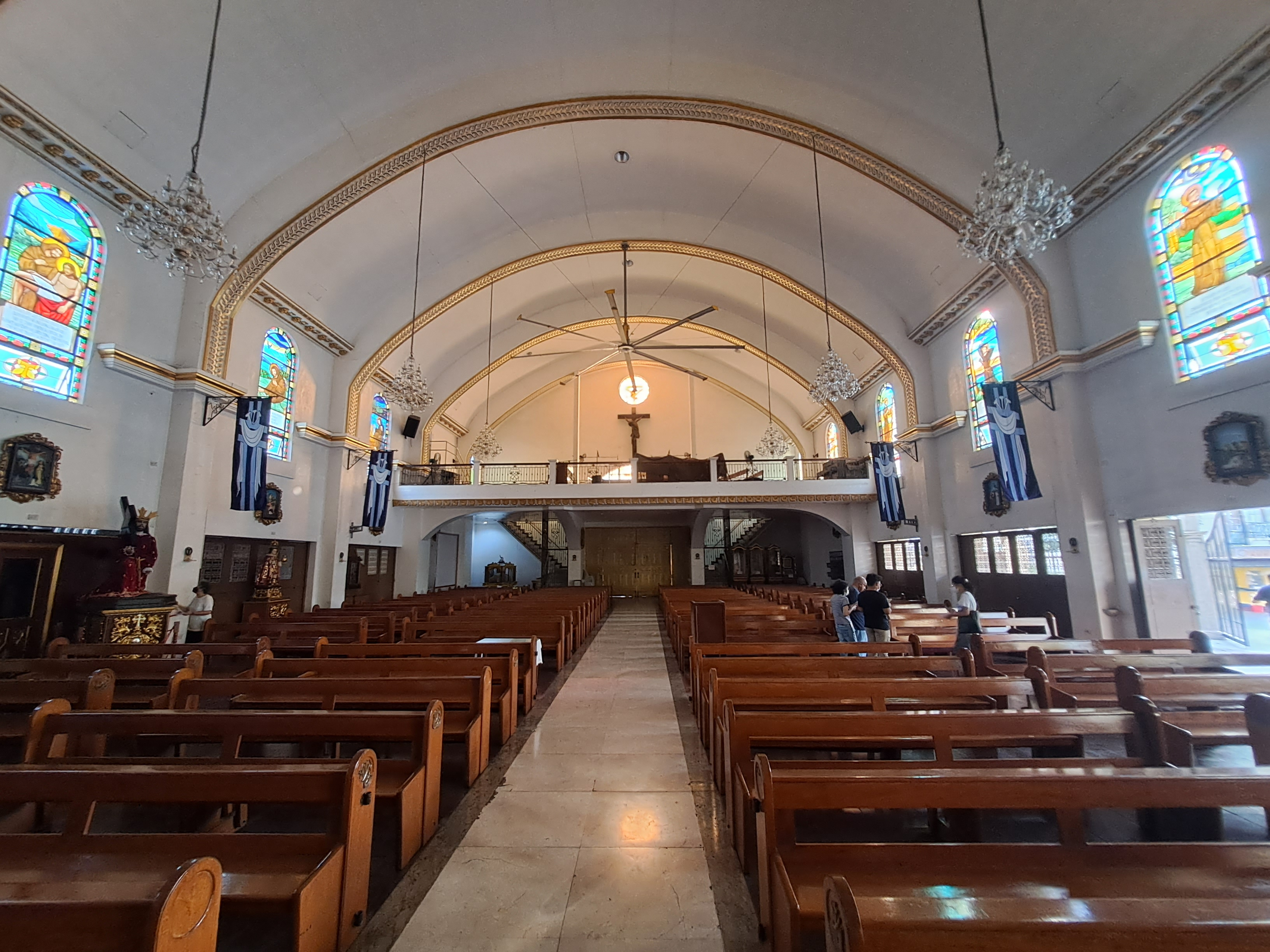
Interior facing the choir loft in 2023

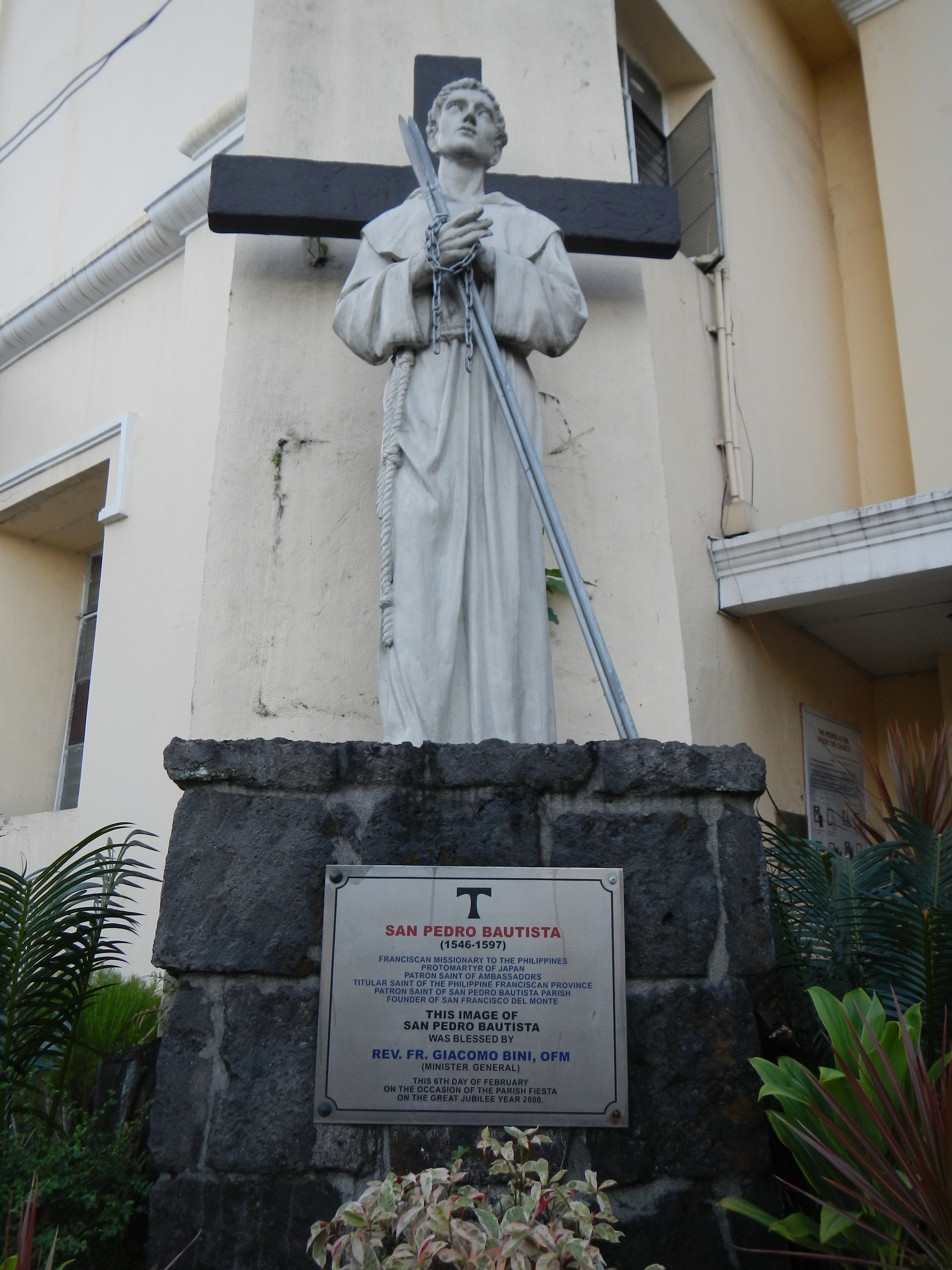
A statue of St. Pedro Bautista next to the original façade

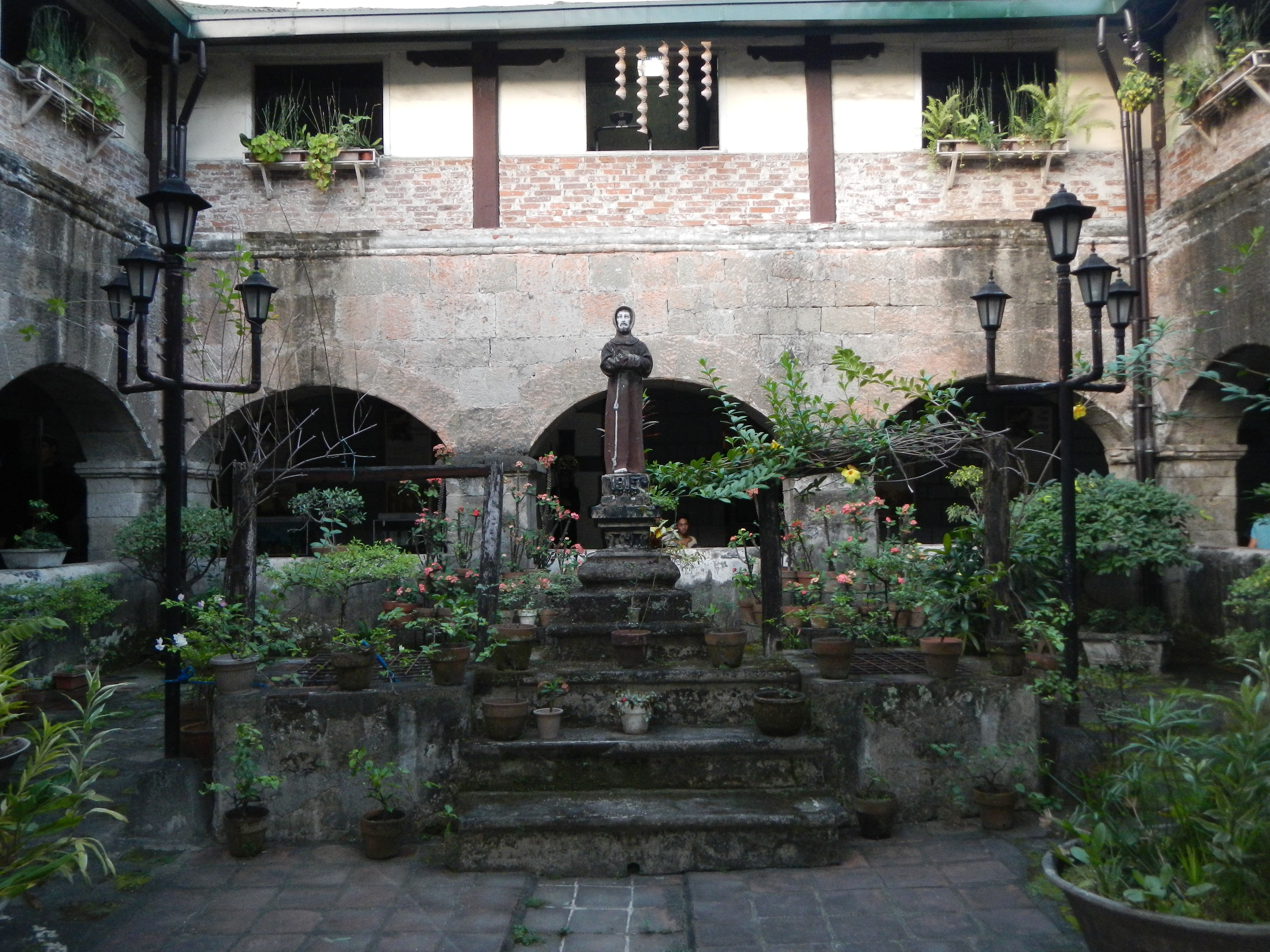
The courtyard and garden of the convent with a statue of St. Francis of Assisi in the middle

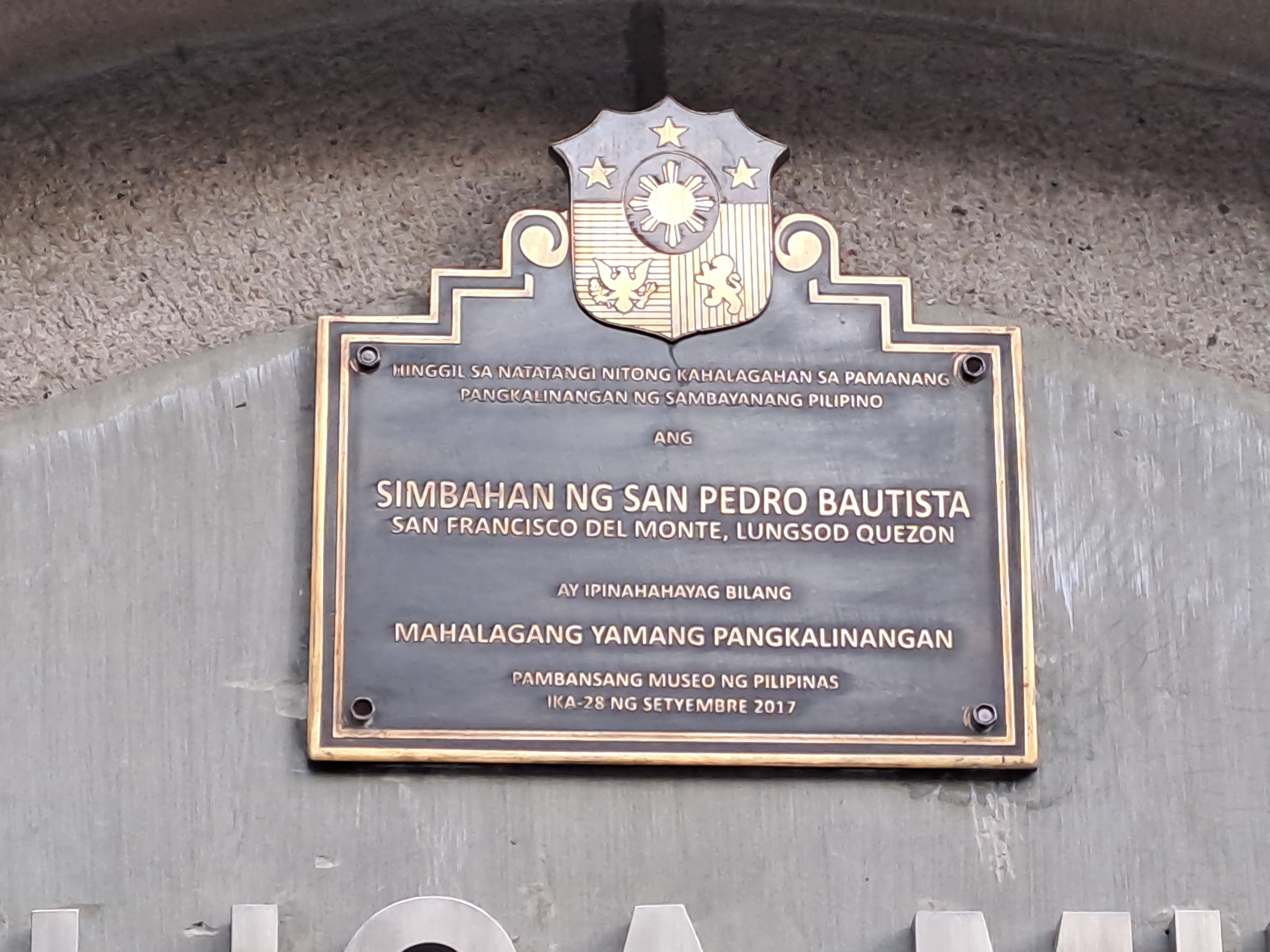
Marker of the National Museum of the Philippines

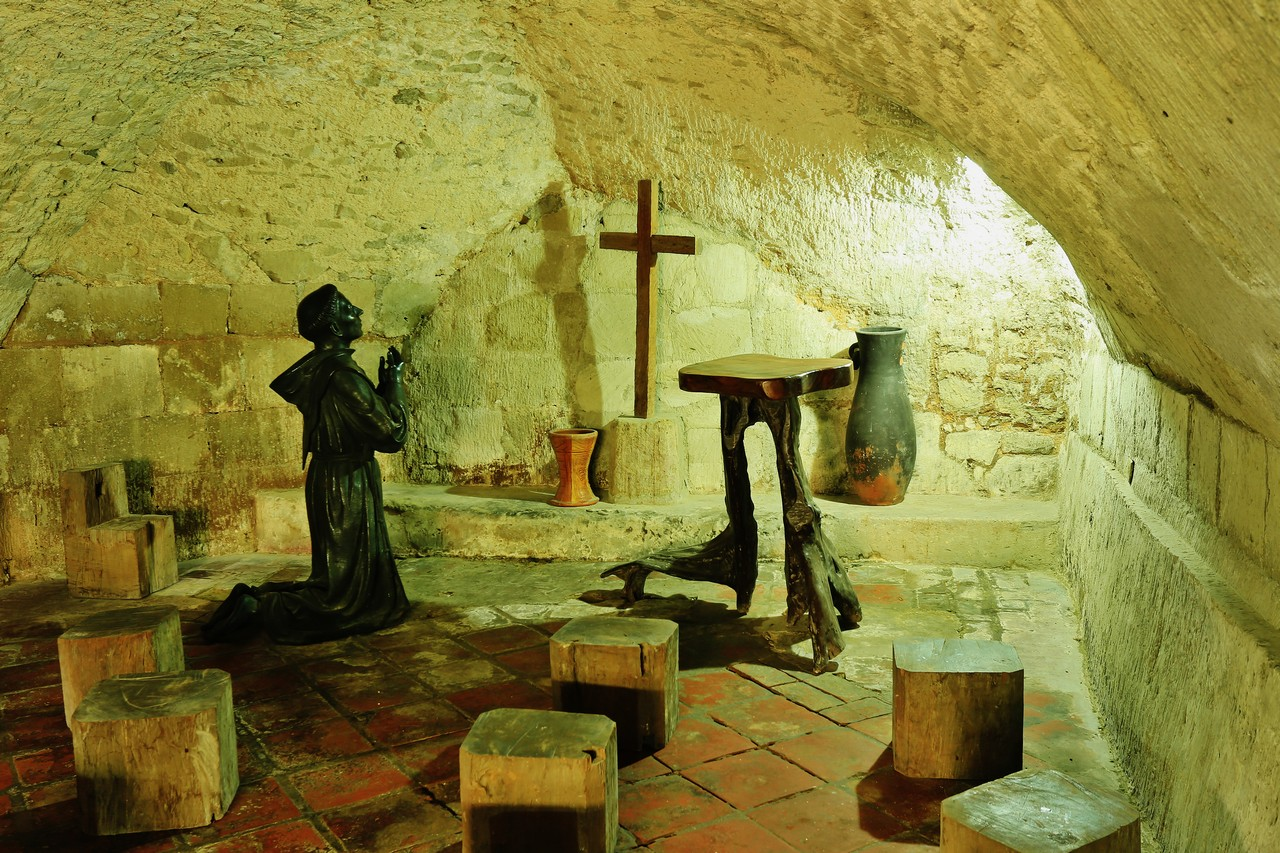
The Holy Cave of St. Pedro Bautista underneath the location of the original altar

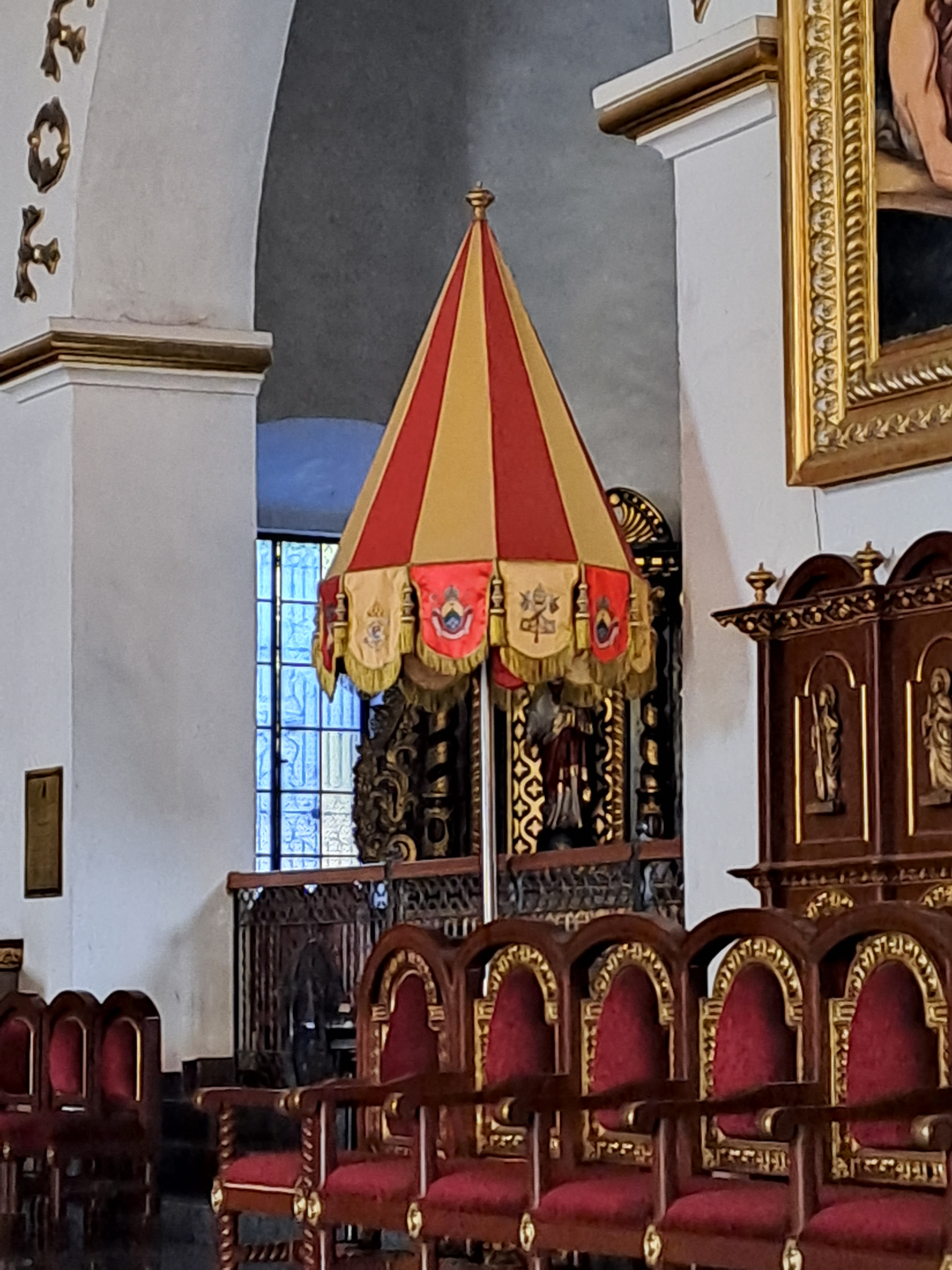
The conopaeum, a common feature among minor basilicas

== See also ==
- Catholic Church in the Philippines
- List of Catholic basilicas
